= Gorilla Jones ("The Fighting Gorilla") =

American boxer

Personal information
- Nickname: The Fighting Gorilla
- Nationality: American
- Weight: Welterweight

Boxing career
- Stance: Orthodox

Boxing record
- Total fights: 37
- Wins: 18
- Win by KO: 10
- Losses: 17
- Draws: 2

Gorilla Jones was an African American boxer known as "The Fighting Gorilla" who fought out of Alexandria, Louisiana as a welterweight from 1913 to 1924. He may have provided the nickname for William Landon Jones (1906–1982), also known as Gorilla Jones, who was the second black boxer to win the world middleweight title.

== Boxing career ==
Jones won on a first round disqualification against Battling Ortega from a low blow in Colorado, Springs on September 1, 1921.

On January 6, 1922, Jones defeated well known black boxer Speedball Hayden in a ninth round knockout at Fort Bliss Arena in El Paso, Texas. Jones was favored in the early publicity for his powerful, aggressive infighting, and heavy hitting. Hayden had defeated Jones earlier on April 1, 1921 in Phoenix, Arizona in an eight round points decision. Jones was said to have put up a great effort but Hayden was clearly his master, deserving the decision. On November 25, 1920, Jones lost a fourth round disqualification in Columbus, Ohio, but was reported by the El Paso Times to have knocked Hayden to the mat four times prior to the foul.

=== Taking the world colored welterweight championship, February, 1915 ===
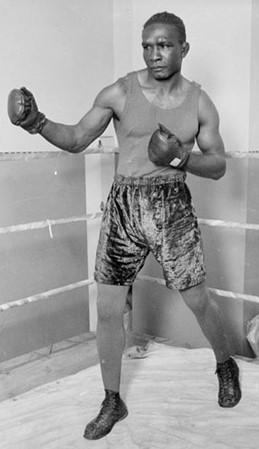
Tiger Flowers

Because of the color bar in pro boxing, Jones never competed for the world title which was not open to black boxers during his career. He won the World Colored Welterweight Championship from Eddie Palmer, the inaugural champion, in a twenty round points decision in New Orleans on February 15, 1915, though he apparently never defended it.

On February 21, 1922, he met future world middleweight champ Tiger Flowers, the first black boxer to win the world welterweight title, in Ciudad Juarez, Mexico for the Southwest Middleweight Championship. He lost in a fourth round knockout of a scheduled 15-round bout. A few sources report that Jones lost via a ninth round T.K.O.

Jones had a career record of 18 wins and 17 losses. He was knocked out ten times and had two draws.

== Professional boxing record ==
37 fights	18 wins	17 losses
By knockout	10	10
By decision	7	6
By disqualification	1	1
Draws	2	

No.	Result	Record	Opponent	Type	Round	Date	Location	Notes
37	Win	18–17–2	Tim Kelly	PTS	4	Dec 29, 1922	L Street Arena, Sacramento, California, U.S.	
36	Loss	17–17–2	Tim Kelly	PTS	4	Dec 15, 1922	L Street Arena, Sacramento, California, U.S.	
35	Draw	17–16–2	Johnny Burns	PTS	4	Oct 26, 1922	West Side Arena, San Jose, California, U.S.	
34	Loss	17–16–1	Lee Anderson	KO	3 (12)	Aug 15, 1922	City Auditorium, Galveston, Texas, U.S.	
33	Win	17–15–1	Sonny Goodrich	TKO	7 (12)	Jun 2, 1922	Beethoven Hall, San Antonio, Texas, U.S.	
32	Loss	16–15–1	Billy Britton	TKO	12 (15)	Apr 25, 1922	Ciudad Juarez, Chihuahua, Mexico	
31	Win	16–14–1	Eddie McGovern	PTS	4	Apr 20, 1922	East Side Arena, San Jose, California, U.S.	
30	Win	15–14–1	Kid Reese	KO	2 (4)	Mar 17, 1922	L Street Arena, Sacramento, California, U.S.	
29	Loss	14–14–1	Tiger Flowers	KO	9 (15)	Feb 21, 1922	Ciudad Juarez, Chihuahua, Mexico	For vacant Southwest middleweight championship
28	Win	14–13–1	Speedball Hayden	KO	9 (15)	Jan 6, 1922	Fort Bliss Arena, El Paso, Texas, U.S.	
27	Win	13–13–1	Chihuahua Kid Brown	KO	3 (?)	Oct 9, 1921	Ciudad Juarez, Chihuahua, Mexico	Finish Fight
26	Win	12–13–1	Battling Ortega	DQ	1 (?)	Sep 5, 1921	Colorado Springs, Colorado, U.S.	
25	Win	11–13–1	Chihuahua Kid Brown	TKO	5 (15)	Aug 17, 1921	Armory, Albuquerque, New Mexico, U.S.	
24	Win	10–13–1	Leo Matlock	KO	6 (15)	Jun 19, 1921	Ciudad Juarez, Chihuahua, Mexico	
23	Draw	9–13–1	Andy Kid Palmer	PTS	15	Apr 17, 1921	Ciudad Juarez, Chihuahua, Mexico	
22	Loss	9–13	Speedball Hayden	PTS	8	Apr 1, 1921	Arizona A.C., Phoenix, Arizona, U.S.	
21	Win	9–12	Sunny Jim Williams	KO	5 (10)	Jan 14, 1921	Fort Bliss Arena, El Paso, Texas, U.S.	
20	Loss	8–12	Andy Kid Palmer	PTS	10	Dec 11, 1920	Douglas, Arizona, U.S.	
19	Loss	8–11	Speedball Hayden	DQ	4 (?)	Nov 25, 1920	Columbus, New Mexico, U.S.	
18	Loss	8–10	Battling Gahee	KO	15 (15)	Sep 18, 1920	National Baseball Park, New Orleans, Louisiana, U.S.	
17	Win	8–9	Battling Norfolk	PTS	15	Jul 16, 1920	National Baseball Park, New Orleans, Louisiana, U.S.	
16	Loss	7–9	Battling Norfolk	KO	5 (20)	Apr 21, 1920	Passtime Athletic Club, Alexandria, Louisiana, U.S.	
15	Loss	7–8	Young Kid Norfolk	TKO	9 (15)	Jan 5, 1920	Dauphine Theater, New Orleans, Louisiana, U.S.	
14	Win	7–7	Eddie Palmer	PTS	15	Oct 31, 1919	Tulane Arena, New Orleans, Louisiana, U.S.	
13	Loss	6–7	Sal Carlo	KO	1 (4)	Oct 2, 1919	Coliseum, San Francisco, California, U.S.	
12	Win	6–6	Jack Mitchell	KO	12 (20)	Mar 14, 1917	New Orleans, Louisiana, U.S.	
11	Win	5–6	Hock Bones	TKO	11 (20)	Mar 2, 1917	New Orleans, Louisiana, U.S.	
10	Win	4–6	Jamaica Kid	PTS	15	Apr 18, 1916	New Orleans, Louisiana, U.S.	
9	Loss	3–6	Eddie Palmer	KO	8 (?)	Apr 1, 1916	McElroy, Louisiana, U.S.	Exact date unknown / Held in 1916
8	Loss	3–5	Kyle Whitney	TKO	8 (20)	Mar 18, 1915	New Orleans, Louisiana, U.S.	
7	Win	3–4	Eddie Palmer	PTS	20	Feb 15, 1915	New Orleans, Louisiana, U.S.	Won world colored welterweight title
6	Win	2–4	Eddie Palmer	PTS	20	Jan 23, 1915	New Orleans, Louisiana, U.S.	
5	Loss	1–4	Eddie Palmer	PTS	10	Dec 20, 1914	McDonoghville Park, New Orleans, Louisiana, U.S.	
4	Loss	1–3	One Round Charley	TKO	7 (10)	Feb 11, 1914	Northside A.C., New Orleans, Louisiana, U.S.	
3	Loss	1–2	Young Tommy Coleman	PTS	10	Dec 12, 1913	New Orleans, Louisiana, U.S.	
2	Loss	1–1	Kyle Whitney	PTS	8	Jul 14, 1913	Memphis, Tennessee, U.S.	
1	Win	1–0	Kid Sylvester	KO	2 (8)	Jun 02, 1913	Phoenix A.C., Memphis, Tennessee, U.S.	

Awards and achievements
Preceded by Eddie Palmer	World Colored Welterweight Champion; February 15, 1915 – Unknown	Succeeded by Cocoa Kid
