= Kid Norfolk =

American boxer (1893–1968)

Personal information
- Born: William Ward; September 20, 1895 Belmont, Virginia, U.S.
- Died: April 15, 1968 (aged 74)
- Height: 5 ft 10 in (1.78 m)
- Weight: Light heavyweight

Boxing career
- Reach: 74 in (188 cm)
- Stance: Orthodox

Boxing record
- Total fights: 151
- Wins: 115
- Win by KO: 48
- Losses: 28
- Draws: 8

Kid Norfolk (born William Ward, 10 July 1893 – 15 April 1968) was an American professional boxer who fought as a light heavyweight and heavyweight from 1910 through 1926, holding wins over many notable boxers of his day including Joe Jeanette, Billy Miske, Jack Blackburn, Harry Greb, Tiger Flowers, Battling Siki, and Gunboat Smith. Norfolk was inducted into the International Boxing Hall of Fame in 2007.

== Professional career ==
Born William Ward in Belmont, Virginia, Norfolk moved with his family to Panama as a youngster. He made his professional boxing debut on 29 November 1910 at the Albaugh Theater in Baltimore, Maryland, losing a six-rounder to Kid Jasper on points. He fought in Baltimore through 1913, then began campaigning in Panama in 1914. He took his name from having been born on Norfolk Street back in Belmont.

=== Panamanian heavyweight title ===
Norfolk defeated Abraham Hollandersky decisively in January 1914 in Colon, Panama. Hollandersky had briefly held the Panamanian Heavyweight title from May 1913. Norfolk first officially fought for the Heavyweight Title on 16 May 1915, taking on Jeff Clark at the Vista Alegre Bull Ring in Panama City. Clark (who weighed 173) gave Kid Norfolk (weighing in at 174) a beating, and won the 20-rounder on points. Their weights properly classed them as light heavies. In a rematch on 12 November 1916, Kid Nortolk took Clark's title away from him on points in 20 rounds. The Kid defended the title against one time world heavyweight contender Arthur Pelkey, a Canadian who had held the Dominion's heavyweight title and the White Heavyweight Championship during the latter days of Jack Johnson's reign. The Kid K.O.-ed Pelkey in the 13th round.

Norfolk fought Sam Langford for the World Colored Heavyweight Championship on 17 December 1917 at Stockyards Stadium in Denver, Colorado, and was K.O.-ed in the second round of the scheduled 20-round bout. On 30 May 1921, The Kid fought Lee Anderson for the colored light heavyweight title in a scheduled 10-round bout in Phoenix, Arizona. Anderson won on a technical knock out when Norfolk returned to his corner in the ninth round, being unable to continue to fight. (They would meet another three times in non-title bouts between 1922 and 1924, and The Kid prevailed each time.) Of their first meeting in Phoenix for the "Colored World Championship", there was surprisingly little coverage, though the Arizona Republic wrote "two thousand fans watched the fights and every one of the 2000 is will to admit it was the best fight ever staged in the state". Norfolk was unable to return to battle at the opening of the ninth round, claiming blindness, as his "left eye was completely closed."

=== Norfolk vs. Greb ===
His next fight was against future world middleweight champ Harry Greb on 29 August 1921 in a 10-rounder at Forbes Field in Pittsburgh, Pennsylvania. The Kid, who at 178¾ lbs. outweighed Greb by 17 1/2 lbs., won four of the first five rounds and knocked Greb down in the third. Greb, however, won all of the last five rounds. Greb won a newspaper decision, when two of the three newspaper covering the fight and the Associated Press gave him the win. During the fight, The Kid apparently landed a punch that caused a detachment of the retina in Greb's eye that later led to Greb going blind in that eye.

=== World colored light heavyweight champion ===
When Norfolk fought The Jamaica Kid on 20 December 1921 at Madison Square Garden in New York City, he had claimed the world colored light heavyweight title. He beat the Jamaica Kid on points in an eight-round bout. In Atlanta on 30 January 1922, Norfolk faced Tiger Flowers, the boxer who would dethrone Greb and become the first African American world middleweight champ in 1926, K.O.-ing him in third round of a 10-rounder. He met reigning colored heavyweight champ Harry Wills on 2 March 1922 in Madison Square Garden in New York City for a 15-round non-title bout, losing to the great champion via a K.O. in the second round. Wills outweighed him by 25¾ lbs.

He had a draw in a fight with Tiger Flowers on the Fourth of July 1922 in Memphis, Tennessee, and they fought again on 8 May 1923, in Springfield, Ohio for the colored Light Heavyweight Title. The Kid prevailed by K.O.-ing Tiger at 2:50 in the first round of their scheduled 12-round bout, in possibly his greatest and most historic victory. Though technically a world championship, there was surprisingly little coverage of the fight, with the Cincinnati Enquirer writing only one line, "Kid Norfolk stopped Tiger Flowers in one round the other night in Springfield, Ohio." Norfolk received far more coverage of non-championship bouts he had against well known white opponents.

=== Norfolk vs. Greb II ===
Norfolk fought Greb one more time on 19 April 1924 in a scheduled 10-rounder in Boston. The Kid won when Greb was disqualified for fighting in the sixth round. The fight was wild and wooly, The Kid besting Greb through the first five rounds. In the second round, Greb had lowered his head and The Kid through the ropes and into the press section, which should have disqualified him, according to the Boston Globe. The last two rounds was a brutal, dirty fight, in which Norfolk intentionally punched Greb in the groin several times. When Greb retaliated, he was disqualified which angered the crowd and forced the referee to quit the ring. The result of the fight was a six-month suspension for both fighters. The boxing commission suspended both Greb and Norfolk six months for fighting after the bell.

=== Later career ===
On 25 May 1925 at the Stadium Rink in Moose Jaw, Saskatchewan, Norfolk fought Canadian light heavyweight champ Jack Reddick in a 12-rounder, winning a decision on points. Though the fight was between two men who had held World Championships, newspaper coverage was minimal. Norfolk retired in 1926 with an official record of 70 wins (with 38 K.O.s) against 22 losses (being K.O.-ed seven times) and six draws along with 30 wins and two losses via newspaper decisions. Despite being a top contender, he never challenged for a world title, the color bar having been drawn in the light heavy and heavyweight divisions in his era.

Norfolk died in 1968.

== Honors ==
Norfolk was inducted into the International Boxing Hall of Fame in 2007.

== Professional boxing record ==
All information in this section is derived from BoxRec, unless otherwise stated.

=== Official record ===
151 fights	87 wins	25 losses
By knockout	49	7
By decision	36	13
By disqualification	2	5
Draws	7	
Newspaper decisions/draws	32	

All newspaper decisions are officially regarded as "no decision" bouts and are not counted in the win/loss/draw column.

No.	Result	Record	Opponent	Type	Round	Date	Age	Location	Notes
151	Loss	87–25–7 (32)	Ted Moore	DQ	4 (10)	Mar 19, 1926	30 years, 180 days	Dreamland Rink, San Francisco, California, U.S.	Norfolk was tossed out of the ring for "not fighting"
150	Loss	87–24–7 (32)	Frank Moody	KO	4 (8)	Sep 21, 1925	30 years, 1 day	Yankee Stadium, New York City, New York, U.S.	
149	Loss	87–23–7 (32)	Floyd Johnson	DQ	4 (10)	Jun 17, 1925	29 years, 270 days	Auditorium, Oakland, California, U.S.	Norfolk was DQ'd for a low blow
148	Win	87–22–7 (32)	Frank Farmer	MD	10	Jun 1, 1925	29 years, 254 days	Armory, Portland, Oregon, U.S.	
147	Win	86–22–7 (32)	Jack Reddick	PTS	12	May 25, 1925	29 years, 247 days	Stadium Rink, Moose Jaw, Saskatchewan, Canada	Won Canadian light-heavyweight title
146	Win	85–22–7 (32)	Ray Pelkey	KO	5 (10)	May 6, 1925	29 years, 228 days	Auditorium, Oakland, California, U.S.	
145	Loss	84–22–7 (32)	Bob Lawson	KO	1 (?)	Mar 14, 1925	29 years, 175 days	Commonwealth Sporting Club, New York City, New York, U.S.	
144	Loss	84–21–7 (32)	Tommy Gibbons	TKO	6 (15)	Dec 9, 1924	29 years, 80 days	Madison Square Garden, New York City, New York, U.S.	
143	Win	84–20–7 (32)	Dan Bright	KO	2 (10)	Sep 27, 1924	29 years, 7 days	Cambria Fairgrounds, Ebensburg, Pennsylvania, U.S.	
142	Win	83–20–7 (32)	Battling Jim McCreary	PTS	10	Sep 9, 1924	28 years, 355 days	Mechanics Building, Boston, Massachusetts, U.S.	
141	Win	82–20–7 (32)	Mexican Joe Lawson	KO	5 (8)	Jul 17, 1924	28 years, 251 days	Bacharach Ball Park, Atlantic City, New Jersey, U.S.	
140	Win	81–20–7 (32)	Tut Jackson	KO	2 (12)	May 28, 1924	28 years, 251 days	Columbus, Ohio, U.S.	
139	Win	80–20–7 (32)	Smiling Kid Nolan	KO	3 (10)	May 17, 1924	28 years, 240 days	Norfolk, Virginia, U.S.	
138	Loss	79–20–7 (32)	Bob Lawson	DQ	2 (6)	May 12, 1924	28 years, 235 days	Broadway Auditorium, Buffalo, New York, U.S.	Low blow
137	Win	79–19–7 (32)	Harry Greb	DQ	6 (10)	Apr 19, 1924	28 years, 212 days	Mechanics Building, Boston, Massachusetts, U.S.	
136	Win	78–19–7 (32)	Lee Anderson	PTS	12	Feb 23, 1924	28 years, 156 days	Commonwealth Sporting Club, New York City, New York, U.S.	
135	Win	77–19–7 (32)	Battling Jim McCreary	PTS	10	Feb 8, 1924	28 years, 141 days	Mechanics Building, Boston, Massachusetts, U.S.	
134	Win	76–19–7 (32)	Sydney Grant	KO	2 (6)	Jan 9, 1924	28 years, 111 days	Gayety Theater, Baltimore, Maryland, U.S.	
133	Win	75–19–7 (32)	Battling Siki	PTS	15	Nov 20, 1923	28 years, 61 days	Madison Square Garden, New York City, New York, U.S.	
132	Win	74–19–7 (32)	Smiling Kid Nolan	KO	3 (10)	Sep 10, 1923	27 years, 355 days	Maryland Baseball Park, Baltimore, Maryland, U.S.	
131	Win	73–19–7 (32)	Tut Jackson	TKO	3 (10)	Aug 24, 1923	27 years, 338 days	Gayety Theater, Baltimore, Maryland, U.S.	
130	Win	72–19–7 (32)	Jamaica Kid	KO	2 (12)	Jul 14, 1923	27 years, 297 days	Commonwealth Sporting Club, New York City, New York, U.S.	
129	Win	71–19–7 (32)	Tiger Flowers	KO	1 (12)	May 8, 1923	27 years, 230 days	Springfield, Ohio, U.S.	Retained world colored light-heavyweight title
128	Loss	70–19–7 (32)	Battling Jim McCreary	PTS	10	Apr 24, 1923	27 years, 216 days	Grand Opera House, Boston, Massachusetts, U.S.	
127	Win	70–18–7 (32)	Wolf Larsen	KO	1 (12)	Mar 31, 1923	27 years, 192 days	Portland, Maine, U.S.	
126	Win	69–18–7 (32)	Jack Taylor	PTS	12	Mar 27, 1923	27 years, 188 days	Pioneer Sporting Club, New York City, New York, U.S.	
125	Loss	68–18–7 (32)	Wolf Larsen	DQ	2 (12)	Jan 30, 1923	27 years, 132 days	Knickerbocker A.C. Arena, Albany, New York, U.S.	Norfolk was disqualified for hitting low
124	Win	68–17–7 (32)	Lee Anderson	PTS	10	Dec 22, 1922	27 years, 93 days	Mechanics Building, Boston, Massachusetts, U.S.	
123	Win	67–17–7 (32)	Jamaica Kid	PTS	12	Sep 25, 1922	27 years, 5 days	North Side Field, Dayton, Ohio, U.S.	Not to be confused with Jamaica Kid
122	Win	66–17–7 (32)	Lee Anderson	PTS	8	Sep 11, 1922	26 years, 356 days	Arena, Boston, Massachusetts, U.S.	
121	Draw	65–17–7 (32)	Tiger Flowers	PTS	8	Jul 4, 1922	26 years, 287 days	Memphis, Tennessee, U.S.	
120	Draw	65–17–6 (32)	Jack Taylor	PTS	10	Jun 23, 1922	26 years, 276 days	Omaha, Nebraska, U.S.	
119	Win	65–17–5 (32)	John Lester Johnson	NWS	12	Jun 2, 1922	26 years, 255 days	Riverside Arena, Covington, Kentucky, U.S.	
118	Win	65–17–5 (31)	Al Smaulding	PTS	8	Apr 7, 1922	26 years, 199 days	El Paso, Texas, U.S.	
117	Loss	64–17–5 (31)	Harry Wills	KO	2 (15)	Mar 2, 1922	26 years, 163 days	Madison Square Garden, New York City, New York, U.S.	
116	Win	64–16–5 (31)	Young Jack Johnson	TKO	8 (10)	Feb 20, 1922	26 years, 153 days	Broadway Auditorium, Buffalo, New York, U.S.	
115	Win	63–16–5 (31)	Tiger Flowers	KO	3 (10)	Jan 30, 1922	26 years, 132 days	Auditorium, Atlanta, Georgia, U.S.	
114	Win	62–16–5 (31)	Jamaica Kid	PTS	8	Dec 30, 1921	26 years, 101 days	Madison Square Garden, New York City, New York, U.S.	Won vacant world colored light-heavyweight title
113	Loss	61–16–5 (31)	Harry Greb	NWS	10	Aug 29, 1921	25 years, 343 days	Forbes Field, Pittsburgh, Pennsylvania, U.S.	
112	Win	61–16–5 (30)	Clem Johnson	NWS	10	Jun 8, 1921	25 years, 261 days	Auditorium, Saint Paul, Minnesota, U.S.	
111	Loss	61–16–5 (29)	Lee Anderson	TKO	9 (10)	May 30, 1921	25 years, 252 days	Arizona A.C., Phoenix, Arizona, U.S.	For world colored heavyweight title "claim"
110	Win	61–15–5 (29)	Jamaica Kid	PTS	15	May 3, 1921	25 years, 225 days	Manhattan Casino, New York City, New York, U.S.	
109	Win	60–15–5 (29)	Phil McNeil	KO	3 (12)	Apr 18, 1921	25 years, 210 days	Auditorium, Freeport, New York, U.S.	
108	Win	59–15–5 (29)	Jack Tasco	TKO	4 (10)	Apr 7, 1921	25 years, 199 days	Orpheum Theatre, York, Pennsylvania, U.S.	
107	Win	58–15–5 (29)	Jack Ward	KO	3 (10)	Mar 21, 1921	25 years, 182 days	Madison Square Garden, New York City, New York, U.S.	
106	Win	57–15–5 (29)	Pinky Lewis	KO	6 (12)	Mar 10, 1921	25 years, 171 days	Madison Square Garden, New York City, New York, U.S.	
105	Win	56–15–5 (29)	Pinky Lewis	DQ	2 (?)	Feb 18, 1921	25 years, 151 days	Madison Square Garden, New York City, New York, U.S.	Lewis was disqualified for excessive holding
104	Win	55–15–5 (29)	John Lester Johnson	NWS	10	Feb 2, 1921	25 years, 135 days	Roller Palace Rink, Detroit, Michigan, U.S.	
103	Win	55–15–5 (28)	Battling Gahee	PTS	8	Jan 24, 1921	25 years, 126 days	Southern A.C., Memphis, Tennessee, U.S.	
102	Win	54–15–5 (28)	Jamaica Kid	NWS	10	Jan 5, 1921	25 years, 107 days	Roller Palace Rink, Detroit, Michigan, U.S.	
101	Win	54–15–5 (27)	Jack Ward	KO	3 (15)	Jan 3, 1921	25 years, 105 days	Broadway Auditorium, Buffalo, New York, U.S.	
100	Win	53–15–5 (27)	Bill Tate	PTS	10	Dec 14, 1920	25 years, 85 days	Madison Square Garden, New York City, New York, U.S.	
99	Win	52–15–5 (27)	Jeff Clark	TKO	2 (15)	Nov 26, 1920	25 years, 67 days	Eureka A.C., Baltimore, Maryland, U.S.	
98	Win	51–15–5 (27)	Jeff Clark	PTS	15	Oct 25, 1920	25 years, 35 days	Columbus, Ohio, U.S.	
97	Win	50–15–5 (27)	Jamaica Kid	PTS	12	Sep 3, 1920	24 years, 349 days	5th Regiment Armory, Baltimore, Maryland, U.S.	
96	Win	49–15–5 (27)	Larry Williams	NWS	10	Aug 18, 1920	24 years, 333 days	Arena, Syracuse, New York, U.S.	
95	Win	49–15–5 (26)	Jack Blackburn	KO	4 (8)	Jun 22, 1920	24 years, 276 days	Madison A.C., Philadelphia, Pennsylvania, U.S.	
94	Win	48–15–5 (26)	Jeff Clark	PTS	15	Jun 21, 1920	24 years, 275 days	Fairmont Arena, Columbus, Ohio, U.S.	
93	Win	47–15–5 (26)	Cliff Patillo	NWS	8	Jun 18, 1920	24 years, 272 days	National A.C., Philadelphia, Pennsylvania, U.S.	
92	Win	47–15–5 (25)	John Lester Johnson	KO	1 (10)	Jun 14, 1920	24 years, 268 days	Flower City A.C., Rochester, New York, U.S.	
91	Loss	46–15–5 (25)	John Lester Johnson	DQ	3 (10)	Jun 7, 1920	24 years, 261 days	Flower City A.C., Rochester, New York, U.S.	
90	Win	46–14–5 (25)	Silas Green	KO	5 (12)	May 31, 1920	24 years, 254 days	Colonial Theater, Baltimore, Maryland, U.S.	
89	Win	45–14–5 (25)	Jamaica Kid	NWS	12	May 17, 1920	24 years, 240 days	Coliseum, Toledo, Ohio, U.S.	
88	Win	45–14–5 (24)	Cleve Hawkins	NWS	10	May 7, 1920	24 years, 230 days	Moose Temple, Detroit, Michigan, U.S.	
87	Win	45–14–5 (23)	Harry Lindsay	KO	2 (8)	Jan 12, 1920	24 years, 114 days	Southern A.C., Memphis, Tennessee, U.S.	
86	Win	44–14–5 (23)	Jack Ward	KO	4 (10)	Dec 19, 1919	24 years, 90 days	Moose Temple, Detroit, Michigan, U.S.	
85	Win	43–14–5 (23)	Jamaica Kid	NWS	12	Dec 3, 1919	24 years, 74 days	Columbus, Ohio, U.S.	
84	Win	43–14–5 (22)	Jamaica Kid	PTS	12	Nov 4, 1919	24 years, 45 days	Grand Opera House, Boston, Massachusetts, U.S.	
83	Win	42–14–5 (22)	Jeff Clark	NWS	10	Oct 24, 1919	24 years, 34 days	Moose Temple, Detroit, Michigan, U.S.	
82	Win	42–14–5 (21)	John Lester Johnson	PTS	15	Oct 3, 1919	24 years, 13 days	Lyric Theater, Baltimore, Maryland, U.S.	
81	Win	41–14–5 (21)	Jamaica Kid	NWS	6	Jul 28, 1919	23 years, 311 days	Shibe Park, Philadelphia, Pennsylvania, U.S.	
80	Win	41–14–5 (20)	Larry Williams	KO	1 (8)	Jun 30, 1919	23 years, 283 days	Open-Air Arena, Jersey City, New Jersey, U.S.	
79	Win	40–14–5 (20)	Jack Ward	KO	3 (10)	Jun 21, 1919	23 years, 274 days	Oriole Park, Baltimore, Maryland, U.S.	
78	Win	39–14–5 (20)	Billy Miske	NWS	8	Jun 9, 1919	23 years, 262 days	Forbes Field, Pittsburgh, Pennsylvania, U.S.	
77	Draw	39–14–5 (19)	Larry Williams	NWS	8	May 26, 1919	23 years, 248 days	Casino Hall, Bridgeport, Connecticut, U.S.	
76	Win	39–14–5 (18)	Bert Kenny	NWS	8	May 22, 1919	23 years, 244 days	Atlantic City, New Jersey, U.S.	
75	Win	39–14–5 (17)	Jim Hosic	NWS	8	Mar 20, 1919	23 years, 181 days	Atlantic City, New Jersey, U.S.	
74	Win	39–14–5 (16)	Battling Dungy	KO	4 (10)	Mar 7, 1919	23 years, 168 days	Albaugh Theater, Baltimore, Maryland, U.S.	
73	Loss	38–14–5 (16)	Clay Turner	NWS	10	Jan 20, 1919	23 years, 122 days	Broadway Auditorium, Buffalo, New York, U.S.	
72	Win	38–14–5 (15)	Clay Turner	KO	4 (12)	Jan 8, 1919	23 years, 110 days	Armory A.A., Boston, Massachusetts, U.S.	
71	Win	37–14–5 (15)	Jamaica Kid	NWS	6	Jan 1, 1919	23 years, 103 days	Olympia A.C., Philadelphia, Pennsylvania, U.S.	
70	Loss	37–14–5 (14)	Clay Turner	PTS	12	Nov 19, 1918	23 years, 60 days	Armory A.A., Boston, Massachusetts, U.S.	
69	Win	37–13–5 (14)	Joe Jennette	NWS	8	Oct 11, 1918	23 years, 21 days	Spring A.C., West Hoboken, New Jersey, U.S.	
68	Win	37–13–5 (13)	Joe Jennette	NWS	8	Jul 19, 1918	22 years, 302 days	International League Ballpark, Jersey City, New Jersey, U.S.	
67	Win	37–13–5 (12)	Battling Jim Johnson	NWS	4	Jul 16, 1918	22 years, 299 days	Madison Square Garden, New York City, New York, U.S.	
66	Win	37–13–5 (11)	George Ashe	KO	3 (12)	May 14, 1918	22 years, 236 days	Armory A.A., Boston, Massachusetts, U.S.	
65	Win	36–13–5 (11)	Bill Tate	TKO	7 (10)	Apr 22, 1918	22 years, 214 days	Lyric Theater, Baltimore, Maryland, U.S.	
64	Win	35–13–5 (11)	Porky Dan Flynn	PTS	12	Apr 16, 1918	22 years, 208 days	Armory A.A., Boston, Massachusetts, U.S.	
63	Win	34–13–5 (11)	George Christian	KO	3 (6)	Apr 15, 1918	22 years, 207 days	Olympia A.C., Philadelphia, Pennsylvania, U.S.	
62	Win	33–13–5 (11)	George Robinson	PTS	12	Apr 5, 1918	22 years, 197 days	Commercial A.C., Boston, Massachusetts, U.S.	
61	Win	32–13–5 (11)	Cleve Hawkins	PTS	12	Apr 4, 1918	22 years, 196 days	North Adams, Massachusetts, U.S.	
60	Win	31–13–5 (11)	Jack Thompson	NWS	6	Mar 25, 1918	22 years, 186 days	Olympia A.C., Philadelphia, Pennsylvania, U.S.	
59	Loss	31–13–5 (10)	Sam Langford	KO	2 (10)	Dec 17, 1917	22 years, 88 days	Stockyards Stadium, Denver, Colorado, U.S.	For world colored heavyweight title
58	Win	31–12–5 (10)	Zulu Kid	PTS	10	Dec 4, 1917	22 years, 75 days	North Adams, Massachusetts, U.S.	
57	Win	30–12–5 (10)	Tom Cowler	NWS	12	Nov 6, 1917	22 years, 47 days	Rhode Island A.C., Thornton, Rhode Island, U.S.	
56	Win	30–12–5 (9)	Johnny Espen	NWS	10	Oct 26, 1917	22 years, 36 days	Harlem S.C., New York City, New York, U.S.	
55	Win	30–12–5 (8)	Billy Miske	PTS	12	Oct 16, 1917	22 years, 26 days	Arena (Armory A.A.), Boston, Massachusetts, U.S.	
54	Win	29–12–5 (8)	George Ashe	NWS	10	Sep 24, 1917	22 years, 4 days	Genesee Arena, Rochester, New York, U.S.	
53	Win	29–12–5 (7)	Gunboat Smith	NWS	10	Aug 20, 1917	21 years, 334 days	Airdome A.C., Rochester, New York, U.S.	
52	Loss	29–12–5 (6)	Gus Christie	NWS	10	Aug 16, 1917	21 years, 330 days	Broadway Auditorium, Buffalo, New York, U.S.	
51	Win	29–12–5 (5)	Gunboat Smith	NWS	10	Aug 3, 1917	21 years, 317 days	Urban Liberty Park, Buffalo, New York, U.S.	
50	Win	29–12–5 (4)	Bert Kenny	NWS	10	Jul 30, 1917	21 years, 313 days	Airdome A.C., Rochester, New York, U.S.	
49	Win	29–12–5 (3)	Bert Kenny	NWS	10	Jul 20, 1917	21 years, 303 days	Harlem S.C., New York City, New York, U.S.	
48	Win	29–12–5 (2)	Tom Cowler	TKO	8 (10)	Jul 19, 1917	21 years, 302 days	Urban Liberty Park, Buffalo, New York, U.S.	
47	Win	28–12–5 (2)	Tom Cowler	NWS	10	Jun 25, 1917	21 years, 278 days	Airdome A.C., Rochester, New York, U.S.	
46	Win	28–12–5 (1)	Tom Cowler	NWS	10	Jun 4, 1917	21 years, 257 days	Airdome A.C., Rochester, New York, U.S.	
45	Win	28–12–5	Morris Tasco	KO	5 (15)	May 9, 1917	21 years, 231 days	Monumental Theater, Baltimore, Maryland, U.S.	
44	Win	27–12–5	Sailor Grande	TKO	5 (10)	Apr 29, 1917	21 years, 221 days	Rochester, New York, U.S.	
43	Win	26–12–5	Arthur Pelkey	KO	13 (15)	Feb 11, 1917	21 years, 144 days	Plaza de Toros Vista Alegre, Panama City, Panama	
42	Win	25–12–5	Arthur Pelkey	KO	13 (20)	Dec 17, 1916	21 years, 88 days	Santa Ana Plaza, Panama City, Panama	Retained Panamanian heavyweight title
41	Win	24–12–5	Jeff Clark	PTS	20	Nov 12, 1916	21 years, 53 days	Plaza de Toros Vista Alegre, Panama City, Panama	Retained Panamanian heavyweight title
40	Win	23–12–5	Jim Briggs	TKO	4 (20)	Sep 10, 1916	20 years, 356 days	Garden Theater, Colon City, Panama	
39	Win	22–12–5	Bill Tate	PTS	20	Jun 11, 1916	20 years, 265 days	Plaza de Toros Vista Alegre, Panama City, Panama	Won vacant Panamanian heavyweight title
38	Win	21–12–5	Milton Durant	KO	3 (15)	May 14, 1916	20 years, 237 days	Garden Theater, Colon City, Panama	
37	Win	20–12–5	Rough House Ware	PTS	25	Mar 12, 1916	20 years, 174 days	Teatro America, Colon City, Panama	
36	Win	19–12–5	Gunboat Smith	KO	2 (20)	Jan 15, 1916	20 years, 117 days	Garden Theater, Colon City, Panama	Not to be confused with Gunboat Smith
35	Win	18–12–5	Gerald Best	KO	2 (15)	Dec 12, 1915	20 years, 83 days	Teatro America, Colon City, Panama	
34	Loss	17–12–5	Jeff Clark	PTS	20	May 16, 1915	19 years, 238 days	Plaza de Toros Vista Alegre, Panama City, Panama	Lost Panamanian heavyweight title
33	Win	17–11–5	Jack Herrick	PTS	20	Apr 11, 1915	19 years, 203 days	Teatro America, Colon City, Panama	
32	Win	16–11–5	Rough House Ware	PTS	25	Mar 14, 1915	19 years, 175 days	Teatro America, Colon City, Panama	Won Panamanian heavyweight title
31	Win	15–11–5	Bobby Loudon	KO	2 (20)	Feb 22, 1915	19 years, 155 days	Teatro America, Colon City, Panama	
30	Win	14–11–5	Jack Livingstone	PTS	25	Sep 13, 1914	18 years, 358 days	Colon City, Panama	
29	Win	13–11–5	Nat Dewey	PTS	20	Aug 14, 1914	18 years, 328 days	Panama City, Panama	
28	Loss	12–11–5	Tommy Connors	PTS	20	May 30, 1914	18 years, 252 days	Bull Ring, Vista Alegre, Panama	
27	Draw	12–10–5	Jack Taylor	PTS	10	May 17, 1914	18 years, 239 days	Panama City, Panama	
26	Win	12–10–4	Abe Hollandersky	PTS	25	Jan 18, 1914	18 years, 120 days	Skating Rink, Colon City, Panama	
25	Win	11–10–4	Jack Livingstone	TKO	2 (20)	Dec 25, 1913	18 years, 96 days	Colon City, Panama	
24	Win	10–10–4	Jack Livingstone	TKO	18 (20)	Nov 27, 1913	18 years, 68 days	Colon City, Panama	
23	Win	9–10–4	Battling Haley	TKO	3 (6)	Apr 8, 1913	17 years, 200 days	Monumental Theater, Baltimore, Maryland, U.S.	
22	Win	8–10–4	Frank Hunter	PTS	6	Feb 7, 1913	17 years, 140 days	Bohemian Hall, Baltimore, Maryland, U.S.	
21	Loss	7–10–4	Morris Tasco	PTS	6	Jan 16, 1913	17 years, 118 days	Westport A.C., Baltimore, Maryland, U.S.	
20	Win	7–9–4	Battling Spriggs	TKO	2 (6)	Oct 8, 1912	17 years, 18 days	Albaugh Theater, Baltimore, Maryland, U.S.	
19	Win	6–9–4	Howard Johnson	TKO	3 (6)	Oct 1, 1912	17 years, 11 days	Albaugh Theater, Baltimore, Maryland, U.S.	
18	Draw	5–9–4	Larry Temple	PTS	3	May 31, 1912	16 years, 254 days	Albaugh Theater, Baltimore, Maryland, U.S.	
17	Draw	5–9–3	Kid Jasper	PTS	4	May 13, 1912	16 years, 236 days	Albaugh Theater, Baltimore, Maryland, U.S.	
16	Draw	5–9–2	Frank Hunter	PTS	3	Apr 9, 1912	16 years, 202 days	Albaugh Theater, Baltimore, Maryland, U.S.	
15	Loss	5–9–1	Black Bill	PTS	4	Mar 7, 1912	16 years, 169 days	Monumental Theater, Baltimore, Maryland, U.S.	
14	Loss	5–8–1	Howard Johnson	PTS	3	Mar 6, 1912	16 years, 168 days	Albaugh Theater, Baltimore, Maryland, U.S.	
13	Draw	5–7–1	Kid Tasker	PTS	4	Feb 6, 1912	16 years, 139 days	St. Patrick's Gymnasium, Baltimore, Maryland, U.S.	
12	Win	5–7	Battling Spriggs	KO	3 (4)	Feb 2, 1912	16 years, 135 days	Albaugh Theater, Baltimore, Maryland, U.S.	
11	Loss	4–7	Black Kid Williams	PTS	6	Oct 18, 1911	16 years, 28 days	Germania Maennerchor Hall, Baltimore, Maryland, U.S.	
10	Win	4–6	Battling Spriggs	TKO	3 (4)	Aug 28, 1911	15 years, 342 days	Savoy Theater, Baltimore, Maryland, U.S.	
9	Win	3–6	Kid Dale	PTS	3	Jul 10, 1911	15 years, 293 days	Ford Opera House, Baltimore, Maryland, U.S.	
8	Win	2–6	Battling Spriggs	KO	3 (3)	May 5, 1911	15 years, 227 days	Albaugh Theater, Baltimore, Maryland, U.S.	
7	Loss	1–6	Kid Jasper	PTS	3	Feb 24, 1911	15 years, 157 days	Lyceum Theater, Baltimore, Maryland, U.S.	
6	Loss	1–5	Kid Stanley	TKO	3 (3)	Feb 10, 1911	15 years, 143 days	Germania Maennerchor Hall, Baltimore, Maryland, U.S.	
5	Win	1–4	Jim Williams	PTS	3	Jan 13, 1911	15 years, 115 days	Germania Maennerchor Hall, Baltimore, Maryland, U.S.	
4	Loss	0–4	Kid Jasper	PTS	4	Dec 26, 1910	15 years, 97 days	Germania Maennerchor Hall, Baltimore, Maryland, U.S.	
3	Loss	0–3	Kid Jasper	PTS	5	Dec 14, 1910	15 years, 85 days	Junior Hall, Frederick, Maryland, U.S.	
2	Loss	0–2	Kid Cummings	PTS	3	Dec 9, 1910	15 years, 80 days	Germania Maennerchor Hall, Baltimore, Maryland, U.S.	
1	Loss	0–1	Kid Jasper	PTS	6	Nov 29, 1910	15 years, 70 days	Albaugh Theater, Baltimore, Maryland, U.S.	

=== Unofficial record ===
151 fights	115 wins	28 losses
By knockout	49	7
By decision	64	16
By disqualification	2	5
Draws	8	

Record with the inclusion of newspaper decisions in the win/loss/draw column.

No.	Result	Record	Opponent	Type	Round	Date	Age	Location	Notes
151	Loss	115–28–8	Ted Moore	DQ	4 (10)	Mar 19, 1926	30 years, 180 days	Dreamland Rink, San Francisco, California, U.S.	Norfolk was tossed out of the ring for "not fighting"
150	Loss	115–27–8	Frank Moody	KO	4 (8)	Sep 21, 1925	30 years, 1 day	Yankee Stadium, New York City, New York, U.S.	
149	Loss	115–26–8	Floyd Johnson	DQ	4 (10)	Jun 17, 1925	29 years, 270 days	Auditorium, Oakland, California, U.S.	Norfolk was DQ'd for a low blow
148	Win	115–25–8	Frank Farmer	MD	10	Jun 1, 1925	29 years, 254 days	Armory, Portland, Oregon, U.S.	
147	Win	114–25–8	Jack Reddick	PTS	12	May 25, 1925	29 years, 247 days	Stadium Rink, Moose Jaw, Saskatchewan, Canada	Won Canadian light-heavyweight title
146	Win	113–25–8	Ray Pelkey	KO	5 (10)	May 6, 1925	29 years, 228 days	Auditorium, Oakland, California, U.S.	
145	Loss	112–25–8	Bob Lawson	KO	1 (?)	Mar 14, 1925	29 years, 175 days	Commonwealth Sporting Club, New York City, New York, U.S.	
144	Loss	112–24–8	Tommy Gibbons	TKO	6 (15)	Dec 9, 1924	29 years, 80 days	Madison Square Garden, New York City, New York, U.S.	
143	Win	112–23–8	Dan Bright	KO	2 (10)	Sep 27, 1924	29 years, 7 days	Cambria Fairgrounds, Ebensburg, Pennsylvania, U.S.	
142	Win	111–23–8	Battling Jim McCreary	PTS	10	Sep 9, 1924	28 years, 355 days	Mechanics Building, Boston, Massachusetts, U.S.	
141	Win	110–23–8	Mexican Joe Lawson	KO	5 (8)	Jul 17, 1924	28 years, 251 days	Bacharach Ball Park, Atlantic City, New Jersey, U.S.	
140	Win	109–23–8	Tut Jackson	KO	2 (12)	May 28, 1924	28 years, 251 days	Columbus, Ohio, U.S.	
139	Win	108–23–8	Smiling Kid Nolan	KO	3 (10)	May 17, 1924	28 years, 240 days	Norfolk, Virginia, U.S.	
138	Loss	107–23–8	Bob Lawson	DQ	2 (6)	May 12, 1924	28 years, 235 days	Broadway Auditorium, Buffalo, New York, U.S.	Low blow
137	Win	107–22–8	Harry Greb	DQ	6 (10)	Apr 19, 1924	28 years, 212 days	Mechanics Building, Boston, Massachusetts, U.S.	
136	Win	106–22–8	Lee Anderson	PTS	12	Feb 23, 1924	28 years, 156 days	Commonwealth Sporting Club, New York City, New York, U.S.	
135	Win	105–22–8	Battling Jim McCreary	PTS	10	Feb 8, 1924	28 years, 141 days	Mechanics Building, Boston, Massachusetts, U.S.	
134	Win	104–22–8	Sydney Grant	KO	2 (6)	Jan 9, 1924	28 years, 111 days	Gayety Theater, Baltimore, Maryland, U.S.	
133	Win	103–22–8	Battling Siki	PTS	15	Nov 20, 1923	28 years, 61 days	Madison Square Garden, New York City, New York, U.S.	
132	Win	102–22–8	Smiling Kid Nolan	KO	3 (10)	Sep 10, 1923	27 years, 355 days	Maryland Baseball Park, Baltimore, Maryland, U.S.	
131	Win	101–22–8	Tut Jackson	TKO	3 (10)	Aug 24, 1923	27 years, 338 days	Gayety Theater, Baltimore, Maryland, U.S.	
130	Win	100–22–8	Jamaica Kid	KO	2 (12)	Jul 14, 1923	27 years, 297 days	Commonwealth Sporting Club, New York City, New York, U.S.	
129	Win	99–22–8	Tiger Flowers	KO	1 (12)	May 8, 1923	27 years, 230 days	Springfield, Ohio, U.S.	Retained world colored light-heavyweight title
128	Loss	98–22–8	Battling Jim McCreary	PTS	10	Apr 24, 1923	27 years, 216 days	Grand Opera House, Boston, Massachusetts, U.S.	
127	Win	98–21–8	Wolf Larsen	KO	1 (12)	Mar 31, 1923	27 years, 192 days	Portland, Maine, U.S.	
126	Win	97–21–8	Jack Taylor	PTS	12	Mar 27, 1923	27 years, 188 days	Pioneer Sporting Club, New York City, New York, U.S.	
125	Loss	96–21–8	Wolf Larsen	DQ	2 (12)	Jan 30, 1923	27 years, 132 days	Knickerbocker A.C. Arena, Albany, New York, U.S.	Norfolk was disqualified for hitting low
124	Win	96–20–8	Lee Anderson	PTS	10	Dec 22, 1922	27 years, 93 days	Mechanics Building, Boston, Massachusetts, U.S.	
123	Win	95–20–8	Jamaica Kid	PTS	12	Sep 25, 1922	27 years, 5 days	North Side Field, Dayton, Ohio, U.S.	Not to be confused with Jamaica Kid
122	Win	94–20–8	Lee Anderson	PTS	8	Sep 11, 1922	26 years, 356 days	Arena, Boston, Massachusetts, U.S.	
121	Draw	93–20–8	Tiger Flowers	PTS	8	Jul 4, 1922	26 years, 287 days	Memphis, Tennessee, U.S.	
120	Draw	93–20–7	Jack Taylor	PTS	10	Jun 23, 1922	26 years, 276 days	Omaha, Nebraska, U.S.	
119	Win	93–20–6	John Lester Johnson	NWS	12	Jun 2, 1922	26 years, 255 days	Riverside Arena, Covington, Kentucky, U.S.	
118	Win	92–20–6	Al Smaulding	PTS	8	Apr 7, 1922	26 years, 199 days	El Paso, Texas, U.S.	
117	Loss	91–20–6	Harry Wills	KO	2 (15)	Mar 2, 1922	26 years, 163 days	Madison Square Garden, New York City, New York, U.S.	
116	Win	91–19–6	Young Jack Johnson	TKO	8 (10)	Feb 20, 1922	26 years, 153 days	Broadway Auditorium, Buffalo, New York, U.S.	
115	Win	90–19–6	Tiger Flowers	KO	3 (10)	Jan 30, 1922	26 years, 132 days	Auditorium, Atlanta, Georgia, U.S.	
114	Win	89–19–6	Jamaica Kid	PTS	8	Dec 30, 1921	26 years, 101 days	Madison Square Garden, New York City, New York, U.S.	Won vacant world colored light-heavyweight title
113	Loss	88–19–6	Harry Greb	NWS	10	Aug 29, 1921	25 years, 343 days	Forbes Field, Pittsburgh, Pennsylvania, U.S.	
112	Win	88–18–6	Clem Johnson	NWS	10	Jun 8, 1921	25 years, 261 days	Auditorium, Saint Paul, Minnesota, U.S.	
111	Loss	87–18–6	Lee Anderson	TKO	9 (10)	May 30, 1921	25 years, 252 days	Arizona A.C., Phoenix, Arizona, U.S.	For world colored heavyweight title "claim"
110	Win	87–17–6	Jamaica Kid	PTS	15	May 3, 1921	25 years, 225 days	Manhattan Casino, New York City, New York, U.S.	
109	Win	86–17–6	Phil McNeil	KO	3 (12)	Apr 18, 1921	25 years, 210 days	Auditorium, Freeport, New York, U.S.	
108	Win	85–17–6	Jack Tasco	TKO	4 (10)	Apr 7, 1921	25 years, 199 days	Orpheum Theatre, York, Pennsylvania, U.S.	
107	Win	84–17–6	Jack Ward	KO	3 (10)	Mar 21, 1921	25 years, 182 days	Madison Square Garden, New York City, New York, U.S.	
106	Win	83–17–6	Pinky Lewis	KO	6 (12)	Mar 10, 1921	25 years, 171 days	Madison Square Garden, New York City, New York, U.S.	
105	Win	82–17–6	Pinky Lewis	DQ	2 (?)	Feb 18, 1921	25 years, 151 days	Madison Square Garden, New York City, New York, U.S.	Lewis was disqualified for excessive holding
104	Win	81–17–6	John Lester Johnson	NWS	10	Feb 2, 1921	25 years, 135 days	Roller Palace Rink, Detroit, Michigan, U.S.	
103	Win	80–17–6	Battling Gahee	PTS	8	Jan 24, 1921	25 years, 126 days	Southern A.C., Memphis, Tennessee, U.S.	
102	Win	79–17–6	Jamaica Kid	NWS	10	Jan 5, 1921	25 years, 107 days	Roller Palace Rink, Detroit, Michigan, U.S.	
101	Win	78–17–6	Jack Ward	KO	3 (15)	Jan 3, 1921	25 years, 105 days	Broadway Auditorium, Buffalo, New York, U.S.	
100	Win	77–17–6	Bill Tate	PTS	10	Dec 14, 1920	25 years, 85 days	Madison Square Garden, New York City, New York, U.S.	
99	Win	76–17–6	Jeff Clark	TKO	2 (15)	Nov 26, 1920	25 years, 67 days	Eureka A.C., Baltimore, Maryland, U.S.	
98	Win	75–17–6	Jeff Clark	PTS	15	Oct 25, 1920	25 years, 35 days	Columbus, Ohio, U.S.	
97	Win	74–17–6	Jamaica Kid	PTS	12	Sep 3, 1920	24 years, 349 days	5th Regiment Armory, Baltimore, Maryland, U.S.	
96	Win	73–17–6	Larry Williams	NWS	10	Aug 18, 1920	24 years, 333 days	Arena, Syracuse, New York, U.S.	
95	Win	72–17–6	Jack Blackburn	KO	4 (8)	Jun 22, 1920	24 years, 276 days	Madison A.C., Philadelphia, Pennsylvania, U.S.	
94	Win	71–17–6	Jeff Clark	PTS	15	Jun 21, 1920	24 years, 275 days	Fairmont Arena, Columbus, Ohio, U.S.	
93	Win	70–17–6	Cliff Patillo	NWS	8	Jun 18, 1920	24 years, 272 days	National A.C., Philadelphia, Pennsylvania, U.S.	
92	Win	69–17–6	John Lester Johnson	KO	1 (10)	Jun 14, 1920	24 years, 268 days	Flower City A.C., Rochester, New York, U.S.	
91	Loss	68–17–6	John Lester Johnson	DQ	3 (10)	Jun 7, 1920	24 years, 261 days	Flower City A.C., Rochester, New York, U.S.	
90	Win	68–16–6	Silas Green	KO	5 (12)	May 31, 1920	24 years, 254 days	Colonial Theater, Baltimore, Maryland, U.S.	
89	Win	67–16–6	Jamaica Kid	NWS	12	May 17, 1920	24 years, 240 days	Coliseum, Toledo, Ohio, U.S.	
88	Win	66–16–6	Cleve Hawkins	NWS	10	May 7, 1920	24 years, 230 days	Moose Temple, Detroit, Michigan, U.S.	
87	Win	65–16–6	Harry Lindsay	KO	2 (8)	Jan 12, 1920	24 years, 114 days	Southern A.C., Memphis, Tennessee, U.S.	
86	Win	64–16–6	Jack Ward	KO	4 (10)	Dec 19, 1919	24 years, 90 days	Moose Temple, Detroit, Michigan, U.S.	
85	Win	63–16–6	Jamaica Kid	NWS	12	Dec 3, 1919	24 years, 74 days	Columbus, Ohio, U.S.	
84	Win	62–16–6	Jamaica Kid	PTS	12	Nov 4, 1919	24 years, 45 days	Grand Opera House, Boston, Massachusetts, U.S.	
83	Win	61–16–6	Jeff Clark	NWS	10	Oct 24, 1919	24 years, 34 days	Moose Temple, Detroit, Michigan, U.S.	
82	Win	60–16–6	John Lester Johnson	PTS	15	Oct 3, 1919	24 years, 13 days	Lyric Theater, Baltimore, Maryland, U.S.	
81	Win	59–16–6	Jamaica Kid	NWS	6	Jul 28, 1919	23 years, 311 days	Shibe Park, Philadelphia, Pennsylvania, U.S.	
80	Win	58–16–6	Larry Williams	KO	1 (8)	Jun 30, 1919	23 years, 283 days	Open-Air Arena, Jersey City, New Jersey, U.S.	
79	Win	57–16–6	Jack Ward	KO	3 (10)	Jun 21, 1919	23 years, 274 days	Oriole Park, Baltimore, Maryland, U.S.	
78	Win	56–16–6	Billy Miske	NWS	8	Jun 9, 1919	23 years, 262 days	Forbes Field, Pittsburgh, Pennsylvania, U.S.	
77	Draw	55–16–6	Larry Williams	NWS	8	May 26, 1919	23 years, 248 days	Casino Hall, Bridgeport, Connecticut, U.S.	
76	Win	55–16–5	Bert Kenny	NWS	8	May 22, 1919	23 years, 244 days	Atlantic City, New Jersey, U.S.	
75	Win	54–16–5	Jim Hosic	NWS	8	Mar 20, 1919	23 years, 181 days	Atlantic City, New Jersey, U.S.	
74	Win	53–16–5	Battling Dungy	KO	4 (10)	Mar 7, 1919	23 years, 168 days	Albaugh Theater, Baltimore, Maryland, U.S.	
73	Loss	52–16–5	Clay Turner	NWS	10	Jan 20, 1919	23 years, 122 days	Broadway Auditorium, Buffalo, New York, U.S.	
72	Win	52–15–5	Clay Turner	KO	4 (12)	Jan 8, 1919	23 years, 110 days	Armory A.A., Boston, Massachusetts, U.S.	
71	Win	51–15–5	Jamaica Kid	NWS	6	Jan 1, 1919	23 years, 103 days	Olympia A.C., Philadelphia, Pennsylvania, U.S.	
70	Loss	50–15–5	Clay Turner	PTS	12	Nov 19, 1918	23 years, 60 days	Armory A.A., Boston, Massachusetts, U.S.	
69	Win	50–14–5	Joe Jennette	NWS	8	Oct 11, 1918	23 years, 21 days	Spring A.C., West Hoboken, New Jersey, U.S.	
68	Win	49–14–5	Joe Jennette	NWS	8	Jul 19, 1918	22 years, 302 days	International League Ballpark, Jersey City, New Jersey, U.S.	
67	Win	48–14–5	Battling Jim Johnson	NWS	4	Jul 16, 1918	22 years, 299 days	Madison Square Garden, New York City, New York, U.S.	
66	Win	47–14–5	George Ashe	KO	3 (12)	May 14, 1918	22 years, 236 days	Armory A.A., Boston, Massachusetts, U.S.	
65	Win	46–14–5	Bill Tate	TKO	7 (10)	Apr 22, 1918	22 years, 214 days	Lyric Theater, Baltimore, Maryland, U.S.	
64	Win	45–14–5	Porky Dan Flynn	PTS	12	Apr 16, 1918	22 years, 208 days	Armory A.A., Boston, Massachusetts, U.S.	
63	Win	44–14–5	George Christian	KO	3 (6)	Apr 15, 1918	22 years, 207 days	Olympia A.C., Philadelphia, Pennsylvania, U.S.	
62	Win	43–14–5	George Robinson	PTS	12	Apr 5, 1918	22 years, 197 days	Commercial A.C., Boston, Massachusetts, U.S.	
61	Win	42–14–5	Cleve Hawkins	PTS	12	Apr 4, 1918	22 years, 196 days	North Adams, Massachusetts, U.S.	
60	Win	41–14–5	Jack Thompson	NWS	6	Mar 25, 1918	22 years, 186 days	Olympia A.C., Philadelphia, Pennsylvania, U.S.	
59	Loss	40–14–5	Sam Langford	KO	2 (10)	Dec 17, 1917	22 years, 88 days	Stockyards Stadium, Denver, Colorado, U.S.	For world colored heavyweight title
58	Win	40–13–5	Zulu Kid	PTS	10	Dec 4, 1917	22 years, 75 days	North Adams, Massachusetts, U.S.	
57	Win	39–13–5	Tom Cowler	NWS	12	Nov 6, 1917	22 years, 47 days	Rhode Island A.C., Thornton, Rhode Island, U.S.	
56	Win	38–13–5	Johnny Espen	NWS	10	Oct 26, 1917	22 years, 36 days	Harlem S.C., New York City, New York, U.S.	
55	Win	37–13–5	Billy Miske	PTS	12	Oct 16, 1917	22 years, 26 days	Arena (Armory A.A.), Boston, Massachusetts, U.S.	
54	Win	36–13–5	George Ashe	NWS	10	Sep 24, 1917	22 years, 4 days	Genesee Arena, Rochester, New York, U.S.	
53	Win	35–13–5	Gunboat Smith	NWS	10	Aug 20, 1917	21 years, 334 days	Airdome A.C., Rochester, New York, U.S.	
52	Loss	34–13–5	Gus Christie	NWS	10	Aug 16, 1917	21 years, 330 days	Broadway Auditorium, Buffalo, New York, U.S.	
51	Win	34–12–5	Gunboat Smith	NWS	10	Aug 3, 1917	21 years, 317 days	Urban Liberty Park, Buffalo, New York, U.S.	
50	Win	33–12–5	Bert Kenny	NWS	10	Jul 30, 1917	21 years, 313 days	Airdome A.C., Rochester, New York, U.S.	
49	Win	32–12–5	Bert Kenny	NWS	10	Jul 20, 1917	21 years, 303 days	Harlem S.C., New York City, New York, U.S.	
48	Win	31–12–5	Tom Cowler	TKO	8 (10)	Jul 19, 1917	21 years, 302 days	Urban Liberty Park, Buffalo, New York, U.S.	
47	Win	30–12–5	Tom Cowler	NWS	10	Jun 25, 1917	21 years, 278 days	Airdome A.C., Rochester, New York, U.S.	
46	Win	29–12–5	Tom Cowler	NWS	10	Jun 4, 1917	21 years, 257 days	Airdome A.C., Rochester, New York, U.S.	
45	Win	28–12–5	Morris Tasco	KO	5 (15)	May 9, 1917	21 years, 231 days	Monumental Theater, Baltimore, Maryland, U.S.	
44	Win	27–12–5	Sailor Grande	TKO	5 (10)	Apr 29, 1917	21 years, 221 days	Rochester, New York, U.S.	
43	Win	26–12–5	Arthur Pelkey	KO	13 (15)	Feb 11, 1917	21 years, 144 days	Plaza de Toros Vista Alegre, Panama City, Panama	
42	Win	25–12–5	Arthur Pelkey	KO	13 (20)	Dec 17, 1916	21 years, 88 days	Santa Ana Plaza, Panama City, Panama	Retained Panamanian heavyweight title
41	Win	24–12–5	Jeff Clark	PTS	20	Nov 12, 1916	21 years, 53 days	Plaza de Toros Vista Alegre, Panama City, Panama	Retained Panamanian heavyweight title
40	Win	23–12–5	Jim Briggs	TKO	4 (20)	Sep 10, 1916	20 years, 356 days	Garden Theater, Colon City, Panama	
39	Win	22–12–5	Bill Tate	PTS	20	Jun 11, 1916	20 years, 265 days	Plaza de Toros Vista Alegre, Panama City, Panama	Won vacant Panamanian heavyweight title
38	Win	21–12–5	Milton Durant	KO	3 (15)	May 14, 1916	20 years, 237 days	Garden Theater, Colon City, Panama	
37	Win	20–12–5	Rough House Ware	PTS	25	Mar 12, 1916	20 years, 174 days	Teatro America, Colon City, Panama	
36	Win	19–12–5	Gunboat Smith	KO	2 (20)	Jan 15, 1916	20 years, 117 days	Garden Theater, Colon City, Panama	Not to be confused with Gunboat Smith
35	Win	18–12–5	Gerald Best	KO	2 (15)	Dec 12, 1915	20 years, 83 days	Teatro America, Colon City, Panama	
34	Loss	17–12–5	Jeff Clark	PTS	20	May 16, 1915	19 years, 238 days	Plaza de Toros Vista Alegre, Panama City, Panama	Lost Panamanian heavyweight title
33	Win	17–11–5	Jack Herrick	PTS	20	Apr 11, 1915	19 years, 203 days	Teatro America, Colon City, Panama	
32	Win	16–11–5	Rough House Ware	PTS	25	Mar 14, 1915	19 years, 175 days	Teatro America, Colon City, Panama	Won Panamanian heavyweight title
31	Win	15–11–5	Bobby Loudon	KO	2 (20)	Feb 22, 1915	19 years, 155 days	Teatro America, Colon City, Panama	
30	Win	14–11–5	Jack Livingstone	PTS	25	Sep 13, 1914	18 years, 358 days	Colon City, Panama	
29	Win	13–11–5	Nat Dewey	PTS	20	Aug 14, 1914	18 years, 328 days	Panama City, Panama	
28	Loss	12–11–5	Tommy Connors	PTS	20	May 30, 1914	18 years, 252 days	Bull Ring, Vista Alegre, Panama	
27	Draw	12–10–5	Jack Taylor	PTS	10	May 17, 1914	18 years, 239 days	Panama City, Panama	
26	Win	12–10–4	Abe Hollandersky	PTS	25	Jan 18, 1914	18 years, 120 days	Skating Rink, Colon City, Panama	
25	Win	11–10–4	Jack Livingstone	TKO	2 (20)	Dec 25, 1913	18 years, 96 days	Colon City, Panama	
24	Win	10–10–4	Jack Livingstone	TKO	18 (20)	Nov 27, 1913	18 years, 68 days	Colon City, Panama	
23	Win	9–10–4	Battling Haley	TKO	3 (6)	Apr 8, 1913	17 years, 200 days	Monumental Theater, Baltimore, Maryland, U.S.	
22	Win	8–10–4	Frank Hunter	PTS	6	Feb 7, 1913	17 years, 140 days	Bohemian Hall, Baltimore, Maryland, U.S.	
21	Loss	7–10–4	Morris Tasco	PTS	6	Jan 16, 1913	17 years, 118 days	Westport A.C., Baltimore, Maryland, U.S.	
20	Win	7–9–4	Battling Spriggs	TKO	2 (6)	Oct 8, 1912	17 years, 18 days	Albaugh Theater, Baltimore, Maryland, U.S.	
19	Win	6–9–4	Howard Johnson	TKO	3 (6)	Oct 1, 1912	17 years, 11 days	Albaugh Theater, Baltimore, Maryland, U.S.	
18	Draw	5–9–4	Larry Temple	PTS	3	May 31, 1912	16 years, 254 days	Albaugh Theater, Baltimore, Maryland, U.S.	
17	Draw	5–9–3	Kid Jasper	PTS	4	May 13, 1912	16 years, 236 days	Albaugh Theater, Baltimore, Maryland, U.S.	
16	Draw	5–9–2	Frank Hunter	PTS	3	Apr 9, 1912	16 years, 202 days	Albaugh Theater, Baltimore, Maryland, U.S.	
15	Loss	5–9–1	Black Bill	PTS	4	Mar 7, 1912	16 years, 169 days	Monumental Theater, Baltimore, Maryland, U.S.	
14	Loss	5–8–1	Howard Johnson	PTS	3	Mar 6, 1912	16 years, 168 days	Albaugh Theater, Baltimore, Maryland, U.S.	
13	Draw	5–7–1	Kid Tasker	PTS	4	Feb 6, 1912	16 years, 139 days	St. Patrick's Gymnasium, Baltimore, Maryland, U.S.	
12	Win	5–7	Battling Spriggs	KO	3 (4)	Feb 2, 1912	16 years, 135 days	Albaugh Theater, Baltimore, Maryland, U.S.	
11	Loss	4–7	Black Kid Williams	PTS	6	Oct 18, 1911	16 years, 28 days	Germania Maennerchor Hall, Baltimore, Maryland, U.S.	
10	Win	4–6	Battling Spriggs	TKO	3 (4)	Aug 28, 1911	15 years, 342 days	Savoy Theater, Baltimore, Maryland, U.S.	
9	Win	3–6	Kid Dale	PTS	3	Jul 10, 1911	15 years, 293 days	Ford Opera House, Baltimore, Maryland, U.S.	
8	Win	2–6	Battling Spriggs	KO	3 (3)	May 5, 1911	15 years, 227 days	Albaugh Theater, Baltimore, Maryland, U.S.	
7	Loss	1–6	Kid Jasper	PTS	3	Feb 24, 1911	15 years, 157 days	Lyceum Theater, Baltimore, Maryland, U.S.	
6	Loss	1–5	Kid Stanley	TKO	3 (3)	Feb 10, 1911	15 years, 143 days	Germania Maennerchor Hall, Baltimore, Maryland, U.S.	
5	Win	1–4	Jim Williams	PTS	3	Jan 13, 1911	15 years, 115 days	Germania Maennerchor Hall, Baltimore, Maryland, U.S.	
4	Loss	0–4	Kid Jasper	PTS	4	Dec 26, 1910	15 years, 97 days	Germania Maennerchor Hall, Baltimore, Maryland, U.S.	
3	Loss	0–3	Kid Jasper	PTS	5	Dec 14, 1910	15 years, 85 days	Junior Hall, Frederick, Maryland, U.S.	
2	Loss	0–2	Kid Cummings	PTS	3	Dec 9, 1910	15 years, 80 days	Germania Maennerchor Hall, Baltimore, Maryland, U.S.	
1	Loss	0–1	Kid Jasper	PTS	6	Nov 29, 1910	15 years, 70 days	Albaugh Theater, Baltimore, Maryland, U.S.	

Awards and achievements
Preceded by Lee Anderson; Vacated title	World Colored Light Heavyweight Champion; December 20, 1921 - Unknown	Succeeded by Lee Anderson; Won vacated title
Preceded by Lee Anderson; Vacated title	World Colored Light Heavyweight Champion; May 8, 1923 - Unknown	Succeeded by Title defunct
