= Tiger Flowers =

American boxer (1895–1927)

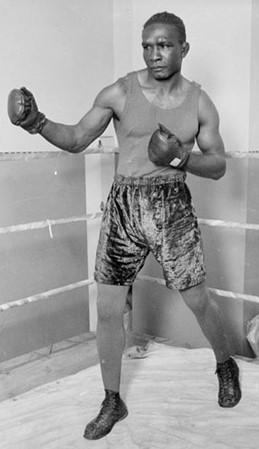

Personal information
- Nickname: Georgia Deacon
- Nationality: American
- Born: Theodore Flowers; February 14, 1895 Camilla, Georgia, U.S.
- Died: November 16, 1927 (aged 32) New York City, U.S.
- Weight: Middleweight

Boxing career
- Stance: Southpaw

Boxing record
- Total fights: 160
- Wins: 135
- Win by KO: 55
- Losses: 17
- Draws: 8

Theodore "Tiger" Flowers (February 14, 1895 – November 16, 1927) was an American professional boxer. Nicknamed "the Georgia Deacon", he rose to prominence in the early 20th century, becoming the first African American world middleweight boxing champion after defeating Harry Greb to claim the title in 1926. He was inducted into Ring magazine's Hall of Fame in 1971, the Georgia Sports Hall of Fame in 1976, the World Boxing Hall of Fame in 1990, and the International Boxing Hall of Fame in 1993.A left-handed fighter, Flowers was fast and elusive, usually avoiding heavy punishment while landing quick, sharp blows.

Flowers is considered a trailblazer of his era, becoming world champion during a time when top-level prizefighting was mostly restricted to white competitors. Flowers has been compared to his predecessors George Dixon, Barbados Joe Walcott, Joe Gans, and Jack Johnson, each of whom had been the first black world champions in their respective weight classes.

== Personal life ==
=== Early life and family ===
Theodore “Tiger” Flowers was born on February 14, 1895, in Mitchell County, Georgia, to Aaron Flowers (1878–1957) and Lula Dawson Flowers (1875–1949), who had married on December 28, 1888, in the county seat of Camilla.

Flowers was one of six children. His siblings were:

• Uly Smith Flowers (b. 1908, Georgia)

• Cecil Nathan Flowers (b. June 5, 1910, Brunswick, Georgia – d. September 30, 1992, New York City, New York)

• Carl Flowers (b. March 5, 1896, Georgia – d. May 25, 1978, Glynn County, Georgia), a baker and pastry cook who married Bessie Anderson (divorced) and later Viola Farrester

• Gertrude Flowers (b. October 1898, Georgia), mother of Ira Marjorie Johnson with Kinchen Johnson

• O’See Flowers Williams (b. February 11, 1900, Brunswick, Georgia – d. January 13, 1992, Volusia County, Florida), a tutor who married Columbus Williams.

=== Marriage and children ===
On November 22, 1915, Theodore Flowers married Willie Mae Spellers. The couple had one daughter, Verna Lee Flowers (later Jackson), born on September 9, 1921, in Georgia. Following Theodore Flowers’ death in 1927, Willie Mae and Verna Lee relocated to Los Angeles.

Verna Lee Jackson died on April 18, 2021, at Martin Luther King Jr. Community Hospital in Los Angeles.

== Professional career ==
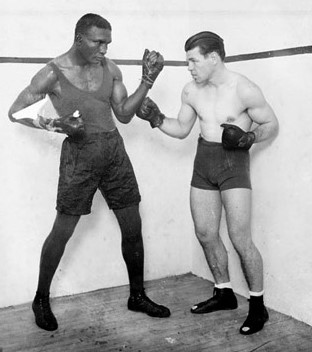
Flowers (left), posing with Mickey Walker before their 1926 title bout

After working as a stevedore on the Georgia coast, Flowers temporarily relocated to Philadelphia in 1918; this is where he ultimately began boxing professionally at the age of 23.

By early 1920 he started training with manager Walk Miller. Over the next six years the lefthander competed all over the country in a grueling ascent to the top of the boxing ranks.

Flowers combined showmanship inside the ropes with a public persona characterized by sobriety and religious devotion; eventually becoming donned "The Deacon". He famously carried a Bible into the ring for each fight and also shared Scripture. A devoutly religious man, Flowers would recite a passage from Psalm 144 before every bout throughout his career.

Flowers' first bout was a victory over fighter Billy Hooper, which he followed up with an impressive two-dozen straight victories before suffering his first loss to Panama Joe Gans.

Like many other African American boxers of the time period, Flowers found it difficult to obtain fights with white fighters early in his career. He found himself primarily having to fight men of his own race, and many times over, in order to make a living. Despite this, during his era Flowers challenged many high-caliber fighters, including Maxie Rosenbloom, Sam Langford, Kid Norfolk, Johnny Wilson, Jamaica Kid, Mickey Walker and many other future Hall of Fame inductees.

By 1924, after being rated the number-one contender for Harry Greb's middleweight title by The Ring magazine, Flowers earned a shot at Greb; despite previously losing a questionable decision to light heavyweight champion Mike McTigue.

On February 26, 1926, before a crowd of 16,311 at Madison Square Garden in New York, Flowers dethroned champion Harry Greb by split decision. He would also defeat Greb once more on August 19, 1926, in a highly controversial decision, with most claiming Greb clearly won.

Tiger's next and final championship bout came against Mickey Walker on December 3, 1926, in Chicago, where he was defeated for the title. A match decided by points in the end, it was considered a controversial decision in the eyes of many. The match later was investigated by the Illinois Athletic Commission, but the decision was not overturned.

Flowers immediately set his sights on a rematch to regain the title, but his career would be cut short before ever gaining the opportunity.

Flowers' final match, a victory over Leo Gates, was fought November 12, 1927.

== Death ==
Flowers was hospitalized in New York City in early November 1927, requiring surgery to remove scar tissue from around his eyes. Complications from the surgery ultimately resulted in his death on November 16, 1927, at age 32. The circumstances of Flowers' death were similar to those of the death of former opponent Harry Greb about a year prior. Greb checked into an Atlantic City clinic for surgery to repair damage to his nose and respiratory tract caused by his ring career and several car crashes. However, complications occurred, and he died of heart failure.

Posthumously, Theodore Flowers was honored as one of the greatest fighters of his era. The International Boxing Research Organization would rank him as number 12 on their list of Greatest Middleweights of All Time. Boxing historian Bert Sugar placed him 68th in his Top 100 Fighters catalog. The Bleacher Report named him the number 6 greatest southpaw in boxing history.

An important figure in Atlanta's black community, Tiger was remembered as a deacon for the Butler Street CME Church and as a member of the lodges of Masons, Elks, and Knights of Pythias. His house on Simpson Road was one of the most luxurious in the city.

Estimates put the number of mourners who turned up to show their respects at around 75,000, and an additional 7,000 crammed the City Auditorium to witness a lavish memorial service. He was laid to rest at Lincoln Cemetery in Atlanta.

Tiger Flowers Cemetery in Lakeland, Florida, is named for him, as is a Tiger Flowers Drive in Atlanta.

== Professional boxing record ==
All information in this section is derived from BoxRec, unless otherwise stated.

=== Official record ===
160 fights	119 wins	15 losses
By knockout	55	10
By decision	58	2
By disqualification	6	3
Draws	8	
Newspaper decisions/draws	18	

All newspaper decisions are officially regarded as "no decision" bouts and are not counted in the win/loss/draw column.

No.	Result	Record	Opponent	Type	Round	Date	Location	Notes
160	Win	119–15–8 (18)	Leo Gates	TKO	4 (10)	Nov 12, 1927	Olympia Boxing Club, New York City, New York, U.S.	
159	Draw	118–15–8 (18)	Maxie Rosenbloom	PTS	10	Nov 9, 1927	Olympia Stadium, Detroit, Michigan, U.S.	
158	Win	118–15–7 (18)	Joe Lohman	NWS	10	Oct 17, 1927	Canton Auditorium, Canton, Ohio, U.S.	
157	Win	118–15–7 (17)	Pete Latzo	UD	10	Sep 30, 1927	Artillery Park, Wilkes-Barre, Pennsylvania, U.S.	
156	Win	117–15–7 (17)	Joe Anderson	PTS	10	Sep 1, 1927	Madison Square Garden, New York City, New York, U.S.	
155	Win	116–15–7 (17)	Jock Malone	PTS	6	Aug 16, 1927	Dugdale Park, Seattle, Washington, U.S.	
154	Win	115–15–7 (17)	Harry Dillon	PTS	10	Aug 10, 1927	Ice Coliseum, Portland, Oregon, U.S.	
153	Draw	114–15–7 (17)	Chuck Wiggins	PTS	10	Aug 3, 1927	Taylor Bowl, Newburgh Heights, Ohio, U.S.	
152	Win	114–15–6 (17)	Bing Conley	PTS	10	Jul 28, 1927	Amusement Park, Norwalk, Connecticut, U.S.	
151	Draw	113–15–6 (17)	Maxie Rosenbloom	PTS	10	Jul 4, 1927	Comiskey Park, Chicago, Illinois, U.S.	
150	Win	113–15–5 (17)	Bob Sage	PTS	10	Jun 17, 1927	Mack Park, Detroit, Michigan, U.S.	
149	Win	112–15–5 (17)	Eddie Huffman	PTS	10	May 27, 1927	Mechanics Building, Boston, Massachusetts, U.S.	
148	Win	111–15–5 (17)	Chuck Wiggins	NWS	10	May 13, 1927	Grand Rapids, Michigan, U.S.	
147	Win	111–15–5 (16)	Chuck Wiggins	PTS	10	Apr 29, 1927	Broadway Auditorium, Buffalo, New York, U.S.	
146	Win	110–15–5 (16)	Soldier George Jones	KO	1 (15)	Mar 29, 1927	Auditorium, Atlanta, Georgia, U.S.	
145	Win	109–15–5 (16)	Lou Bogash	PTS	10	Feb 18, 1927	Mechanics Building, Boston, Massachusetts, U.S.	
144	Win	108–15–5 (16)	Lee Anderson	PTS	4	Jan 25, 1927	Denver, Colorado, U.S.	
143	Loss	107–15–5 (16)	Leo Lomski	PTS	10	Jan 22, 1927	Wrigley Field, Los Angeles, California, U.S.	
142	Win	107–14–5 (16)	Tut Jackson	KO	3 (10)	Jan 6, 1927	Armory, Grand Rapids, Michigan, U.S.	
141	Loss	106–14–5 (16)	Mickey Walker	PTS	10	Dec 3, 1926	Coliseum, Chicago, Illinois, U.S.	Lost NYSAC, NBA, and The Ring middleweight titles
140	Win	106–13–5 (16)	Eddie Huffman	PTS	10	Nov 22, 1926	Coliseum, Chicago, Illinois, U.S.	
139	Loss	105–13–5 (16)	Maxie Rosenbloom	DQ	9 (10)	Oct 15, 1926	Mechanics Building, Boston, Massachusetts, U.S.	
138	Win	105–12–5 (16)	Happy Hunter	KO	3 (8)	Sep 16, 1926	Memphis, Tennessee, U.S.	
137	Win	104–12–5 (16)	Harry Greb	SD	15	Aug 19, 1926	Madison Square Garden, New York City, New York, U.S.	Retained NYSAC, NBA, and The Ring middleweight titles
136	Win	103–12–5 (16)	Battling Jim McCreary	DQ	3 (10)	Aug 10, 1926	Auditorium, Atlanta, Georgia, U.S.	
135	Win	102–12–5 (16)	Eddie Huffman	PTS	10	Jul 24, 1926	Ascot Park, Los Angeles, California, U.S.	
134	Win	101–12–5 (16)	Lee Anderson	KO	2 (?)	Jul 11, 1926	Coliseum, Ciudad Juarez, Chihuahua, Mexico	
133	Win	100–12–5 (16)	Ray Neuman	PTS	10	Jun 28, 1926	Braves Field, Boston, Massachusetts, U.S.	
132	Win	99–12–5 (16)	Young Bob Fitzsimmons	NWS	10	Jun 18, 1926	Boyle's Thirty Acres, Jersey City, New Jersey, U.S.	
131	Win	99–12–5 (15)	Allentown Joe Gans	UD	10	Apr 16, 1926	South Main Street Armory, Wilkes-Barre, Pennsylvania, U.S.	
130	Win	98–12–5 (15)	Harry Greb	SD	15	Feb 26, 1926	Madison Square Garden, New York City, New York, U.S.	Won NYSAC, NBA, and The Ring middleweight titles
129	Loss	97–12–5 (15)	Mike McTigue	SD	10	Dec 23, 1925	Madison Square Garden, New York City, New York, U.S.	
128	Win	97–11–5 (15)	Frank Moody	PTS	10	Dec 10, 1925	Mechanics Building, Boston, Massachusetts, U.S.	
127	Win	96–11–5 (15)	Benny Ross	PTS	6	Nov 30, 1925	Broadway Auditorium, Buffalo, New York, U.S.	
126	Loss	95–11–5 (15)	Chuck Wiggins	NWS	10	Oct 27, 1925	East Chicago, Indiana, U.S.	
125	Win	95–11–5 (14)	Jock Malone	NWS	10	Oct 23, 1925	Auditorium, Saint Paul, Minnesota, U.S.	
124	Win	95–11–5 (13)	Ted Moore	TKO	6 (10)	Sep 7, 1925	Taylor Bowl, Newburgh Heights, Ohio, U.S.	
123	Win	94–11–5 (13)	Jock Malone	PTS	10	Aug 28, 1925	Braves Field, Boston, Massachusetts, U.S.	
122	Win	93–11–5 (13)	Allentown Joe Gans	NWS	10	Aug 21, 1925	Grand Rapids, Michigan, U.S.	
121	Win	93–11–5 (12)	Lou Bogash	NWS	10	Jul 24, 1925	Aurora Bowl, Aurora, Illinois, U.S.	
120	Win	93–11–5 (11)	Pat McCarthy	PTS	10	Jul 20, 1925	Braves Field, Boston, Massachusetts, U.S.	
119	Win	92–11–5 (11)	Jack Stone	TKO	4 (12)	Jun 26, 1925	Elizabeth, New Jersey, U.S.	
118	Win	91–11–5 (11)	Lee Anderson	DQ	3 (10)	Jun 20, 1925	Commonwealth Sporting Club, New York City, New York, U.S.	
117	Win	90–11–5 (11)	Lee Anderson	UD	10	Jun 8, 1925	Shibe Park, Philadelphia, Pennsylvania, U.S.	
116	Win	89–11–5 (11)	Jock Malone	NWS	10	Jun 5, 1925	East Chicago, Indiana, U.S.	
115	Win	89–11–5 (10)	Lou Bogash	PTS	12	May 26, 1925	State Street Arena, Bridgeport, Connecticut, U.S.	
114	Win	88–11–5 (10)	Pal Reed	PTS	10	May 18, 1925	Mechanics Building, Boston, Massachusetts, U.S.	
113	Win	87–11–5 (10)	Battling Mims	KO	5 (?)	May 4, 1925	Macon, Georgia, U.S.	
112	Win	86–11–5 (10)	Lou Bogash	KO	5 (12)	Apr 29, 1925	Savannah, Georgia, U.S.	
111	Win	85–11–5 (10)	Lou Bogash	PTS	10	Mar 20, 1925	Mechanics Building, Boston, Massachusetts, U.S.	
110	Win	84–11–5 (10)	Sailor Darden	NWS	12	Mar 16, 1925	Coliseum, Toledo, Ohio, U.S.	
109	Loss	84–11–5 (9)	Jack Delaney	KO	4 (12)	Feb 26, 1925	Madison Square Garden, New York City, New York, U.S.	
108	Loss	84–10–5 (9)	Lou Bogash	DQ	3 (10)	Feb 16, 1925	Mechanics Building, Boston, Massachusetts, U.S.	
107	Win	84–9–5 (9)	Jackie Clark	TKO	5 (12)	Feb 14, 1925	Commonwealth Sporting Club, New York City, New York, U.S.	
106	Win	83–9–5 (9)	Jamaica Kid	TKO	10 (12)	Feb 5, 1925	Lakeside Park Pavillion, Dayton, Ohio, U.S.	
105	Win	82–9–5 (9)	Ted Moore	NWS	12	Feb 2, 1925	Sussex Avenue Armory, Newark, New Jersey, U.S.	
104	Win	82–9–5 (8)	Bill Savage	KO	2 (10)	Jan 29, 1925	Marieville Gardens, North Providence, Rhode Island, U.S.	
103	Win	81–9–5 (8)	Tommy Robson	TKO	8 (12)	Jan 28, 1925	Mechanics Building, Boston, Massachusetts, U.S.	
102	Loss	80–9–5 (8)	Jack Delaney	KO	2 (12)	Jan 16, 1925	Madison Square Garden, New York City, New York, U.S.	
101	Win	80–8–5 (8)	Dan O'Dowd	TKO	6 (10)	Jan 7, 1925	Marieville Gardens, North Providence, Rhode Island, U.S.	
100	Win	79–8–5 (8)	Billy Britton	TKO	4 (10)	Jan 5, 1925	Mechanics Building, Boston, Massachusetts, U.S.	
99	Win	78–8–5 (8)	Joe Lohman	TKO	3 (10)	Jan 1, 1925	Rink S.C., Brooklyn, New York City, New York, U.S.	
98	Draw	77–8–5 (8)	Frankie Schoell	PTS	6	Dec 26, 1924	Broadway Auditorium, Buffalo, New York, U.S.	
97	Win	77–8–4 (8)	Jack Townsend	TKO	5 (10)	Dec 15, 1924	Arena, Philadelphia, Pennsylvania, U.S.	
96	Win	76–8–4 (8)	Johnny Wilson	TKO	3 (10)	Dec 9, 1924	Madison Square Garden, New York City, New York, U.S.	
95	Win	75–8–4 (8)	Battling Gahee	TKO	2 (12)	Dec 1, 1924	Columbus, Ohio, U.S.	
94	Win	74–8–4 (8)	Clem Johnson	NWS	12	Nov 27, 1924	Canton Auditorium, Canton, Ohio, U.S.	
93	Win	74–8–4 (7)	Jerry Hayes	KO	2 (4)	Nov 10, 1924	Arena, Philadelphia, Pennsylvania, U.S.	
92	Win	73–8–4 (7)	Hughie Clements	TKO	2 (4)	Nov 10, 1924	Arena, Philadelphia, Pennsylvania, U.S.	
91	Win	72–8–4 (7)	George Robinson	PTS	12	Nov 1, 1924	Commonwealth Sporting Club, New York City, New York, U.S.	
90	Win	71–8–4 (7)	Joe Lohman	DQ	4 (10)	Oct 23, 1924	Moose Arena, Hamilton, Ohio, U.S.	
89	Win	70–8–4 (7)	Cleve Hawkins	KO	3 (?)	Oct 21, 1924	Auditorium, Atlanta, Georgia, U.S.	
88	Win	69–8–4 (7)	Jamaica Kid	TKO	8 (12)	Oct 11, 1924	Commonwealth Sporting Club, New York City, New York, U.S.	
87	Win	68–8–4 (7)	Battling Gahee	TKO	4 (12)	Sep 30, 1924	Weller Theater, Zanesville, Ohio, U.S.	
86	Win	67–8–4 (7)	Tut Jackson	KO	2 (12)	Sep 29, 1924	Canton Auditorium, Canton, Ohio, U.S.	
85	Win	66–8–4 (7)	Lee Anderson	UD	12	Sep 22, 1924	Columbus, Ohio, U.S.	
84	Win	65–8–4 (7)	Jamaica Kid	UD	12	Sep 15, 1924	Columbus, Ohio, U.S.	
83	Win	64–8–4 (7)	Tut Jackson	TKO	8 (10)	Sep 1, 1924	League Park, Martins Ferry, Ohio, U.S.	
82	Loss	63–8–4 (7)	Harry Greb	NWS	10	Aug 21, 1924	Legion Stadium, Fremont, Ohio, U.S.	
81	Win	63–8–4 (6)	Oscar Mortimer	TKO	6 (12)	Aug 12, 1924	Soledad Roof, San Antonio, Texas, U.S.	
80	Win	62–8–4 (6)	Jack Townsend	TKO	11 (12)	Aug 2, 1924	Commonwealth Sporting Club, New York City, New York, U.S.	
79	Win	61–8–4 (6)	Jamaica Kid	DQ	3 (12)	Jul 22, 1924	Riverside Arena, Covington, Kentucky, U.S.	
78	Win	60–8–4 (6)	Lee Anderson	DQ	11 (12)	Jul 3, 1924	Municipal Auditorium, Atlanta, Georgia, U.S.	
77	Win	59–8–4 (6)	Jamaica Kid	NWS	10	Jun 27, 1924	Grand Rapids, Michigan, U.S.	
76	Win	59–8–4 (5)	Battling Gahee	NWS	10	Jun 20, 1924	Fremont Theatre, Fremont, Ohio, U.S.	
75	Win	59–8–4 (4)	Joe Lohman	PTS	12	Jun 14, 1924	Commonwealth Sporting Club, New York City, New York, U.S.	
74	Win	58–8–4 (4)	Willie Walker	TKO	7 (12)	May 14, 1924	Commonwealth Sporting Club, New York City, New York, U.S.	
73	Win	57–8–4 (4)	Ted Jamieson	PTS	12	May 3, 1924	Commonwealth Sporting Club, New York City, New York, U.S.	
72	Win	56–8–4 (4)	George Robinson	PTS	12	Apr 29, 1924	Auditorium, Atlanta, Georgia, U.S.	
71	Win	55–8–4 (4)	Jimmy Darcy	PTS	12	Apr 19, 1924	Commonwealth Sporting Club, New York City, New York, U.S.	
70	Win	54–8–4 (4)	Dave Thornton	KO	2 (?)	Apr 9, 1924	Bijou Ring, Nashville, Tennessee, U.S.	
69	Win	53–8–4 (4)	Lee Anderson	PTS	12	Mar 29, 1924	Commonwealth Sporting Club, New York City, New York, U.S.	
68	Win	52–8–4 (4)	Bob Lawson	KO	6 (8)	Mar 19, 1924	Nashville, Tennessee, U.S.	
67	Win	51–8–4 (4)	Jamaica Kid	NWS	10	Mar 3, 1924	Fremont Theatre, Fremont, Ohio, U.S.	
66	Win	51–8–4 (3)	Battling Gahee	PTS	12	Feb 25, 1924	Barberton Stadium, Barberton, Ohio, U.S.	
65	Win	50–8–4 (3)	Bob Lawson	TKO	10 (12)	Feb 18, 1924	Coliseum, Toledo, Ohio, U.S.	
64	Win	49–8–4 (3)	Sonny Goodrich	PTS	12	Jan 31, 1924	Bellinger Theater, San Antonio, Texas, U.S.	
63	Win	48–8–4 (3)	Herbert Moore	KO	2 (?)	Jan 23, 1924	Nashville, Tennessee, U.S.	
62	Win	47–8–4 (3)	Sailor Darden	PTS	12	Dec 28, 1923	Auditorium, Atlanta, Georgia, U.S.	
61	Win	46–8–4 (3)	Rufe Cameron	KO	4 (?)	Dec 6, 1923	United States of America	Exact date and location unknown
60	Draw	45–8–4 (3)	George Robinson	PTS	12	Nov 27, 1923	Auditorium, Atlanta, Georgia, U.S.	
59	Loss	45–8–3 (3)	Fireman Jim Flynn	RTD	5 (?)	Sep 17, 1923	Mexico City, Distrito Federal, Mexico	
58	Win	45–7–3 (3)	Jamaica Kid	PTS	10	Sep 4, 1923	Auditorium, Atlanta, Georgia, U.S.	
57	Win	44–7–3 (3)	Whitey Black	NWS	10	Jul 30, 1923	Danceland Arena, Detroit, Michigan, U.S.	
56	Win	44–7–3 (2)	Tut Jackson	PTS	12	Jul 18, 1923	Springfield, Ohio, U.S.	
55	Draw	43–7–3 (2)	Tut Jackson	PTS	12	Jul 3, 1923	Auditorium, Atlanta, Georgia, U.S.	
54	Win	43–7–2 (2)	Rufe Cameron	PTS	10	Jun 20, 1923	Bijou Ring, Nashville, Tennessee, U.S.	
53	Win	42–7–2 (2)	Panama Joe Gans	NWS	12	May 25, 1923	Coliseum, Toledo, Ohio, U.S.	
52	Win	42–7–2 (1)	Sailor Tom King	PTS	15	May 15, 1923	Ciudad Juarez, Chihuahua, Mexico	
51	Loss	41–7–2 (1)	Kid Norfolk	KO	1 (12)	May 8, 1923	Springfield, Ohio, U.S.	For world colored light-heavyweight title
50	Win	41–6–2 (1)	Jamaica Kid	NWS	12	Apr 20, 1923	Coliseum, Toledo, Ohio, U.S.	
49	Win	41–6–2	Jack Ray	KO	3 (?)	Mar 19, 1923	Central Garage Arena, Nashville, Tennessee, U.S.	
48	Win	40–6–2	Battling Mims	PTS	8	Feb 28, 1923	Nashville, Tennessee, U.S.	
47	Win	39–6–2	Bob Lawson	PTS	8	Feb 21, 1923	Nashville, Tennessee, U.S.	
46	Win	38–6–2	Frank Carbone	DQ	10 (15)	Dec 22, 1922	Ciudad Juarez, Chihuahua, Mexico	
45	Win	37–6–2	Eddie Palmer	TKO	10 (15)	Dec 13, 1922	Coliseum Arena, New Orleans, Louisiana, U.S.	
44	Win	36–6–2	Kid Davis	KO	3 (10)	Dec 1, 1922	L Street Park, Brunswick, Georgia, U.S.	
43	Win	35–6–2	Eddie Palmer	PTS	8	Nov 11, 1922	Memphis, Tennessee, U.S.	Exact date unknown
42	Win	34–6–2	Battling Gahee	PTS	8	Oct 10, 1922	Memphis, Tennessee, U.S.	
41	Win	33–6–2	Kid Davis	KO	1 (?)	Sep 9, 1922	United States of America	Exact date and location unknown
40	Win	32–6–2	Kid Paddy	KO	1 (?)	Aug 30, 1922	United States of America	Exact date and location unknown
39	Win	31–6–2	Andy Kid Palmer	PTS	15	Aug 22, 1922	Ciudad Juarez, Chihuahua, Mexico	
38	Loss	30–6–2	Jamaica Kid	RTD	2 (12)	Jul 26, 1922	Riverside Arena, Covington, Kentucky, U.S.	
37	Draw	30–5–2	Kid Norfolk	PTS	8	Jul 4, 1922	Memphis, Tennessee, U.S.	
36	Loss	30–5–1	Sam Langford	KO	2 (10)	Jun 5, 1922	Ponce de Leon Ballpark, Atlanta, Georgia, U.S.	
35	Win	30–4–1	Frankie Murphy	PTS	15	May 16, 1922	Ciudad Juarez, Chihuahua, Mexico	
34	Loss	29–4–1	Lee Anderson	KO	7 (15)	May 9, 1922	Ciudad Juarez, Chihuahua, Mexico	For vacant world colored light-heavyweight title
33	Win	29–3–1	Billy Britton	PTS	15	Apr 11, 1922	Ciudad Juarez, Chihuahua, Mexico	
32	Win	28–3–1	Jim Jam Barry	KO	5 (15)	Mar 28, 1922	Ciudad Juarez, Chihuahua, Mexico	
31	Win	27–3–1	Chihuahua Kid Brown	KO	1 (15)	Mar 21, 1922	Ciudad Juarez, Chihuahua, Mexico	
30	Draw	26–3–1	Jim Jam Barry	PTS	15	Mar 7, 1922	Garden Play Arena, Ciudad Juarez, Chihuahua, Mexico	
29	Win	26–3	Gorilla Jones	KO	9 (15)	Feb 21, 1922	Gonzalez Garden Arena, Ciudad Juarez, Chihuahua, Mexico	Won vacant Southwest middleweight title Not to be confused with Gorilla Jones
28	Loss	25–3	Kid Norfolk	KO	3 (10)	Jan 30, 1922	Auditorium, Atlanta, Georgia, U.S.	
27	Win	25–2	Battling Burke	KO	4 (8)	Jan 11, 1922	Nashville, Tennessee, U.S.	
26	Win	24–2	Jack Ray	KO	2 (?)	Jan 1, 1922	United States of America	Exact date and location unknown
25	Loss	23–2	Panama Joe Gans	KO	5 (15)	Dec 15, 1921	Auditorium, Atlanta, Georgia, U.S.	
24	Win	23–1	Battling Gahee	PTS	8	Nov 8, 1921	Memphis, Tennessee, U.S.	
23	Win	22–1	Whitey Black	PTS	8	Oct 24, 1921	Memphis, Tennessee, U.S.	
22	Win	21–1	Battling Gahee	PTS	10	Oct 18, 1921	Business Men's A.C., Atlanta, Georgia, U.S.	
21	Win	20–1	Chihuahua Kid Brown	KO	3 (10)	Sep 26, 1921	Auditorium, Atlanta, Georgia, U.S.	
20	Loss	19–1	Panama Joe Gans	KO	6 (15)	Aug 8, 1921	Auditorium, Atlanta, Georgia, U.S.	
19	Win	19–0	Kid Williams	KO	3 (?)	Aug 1, 1921	United States of America	Exact date and location unknown
18	Win	18–0	Jack Moore	KO	2 (12)	Jul 12, 1921	Pekin Theatre, Savannah, Georgia, U.S.	
17	Win	17–0	Battling Mims	PTS	10	Jul 7, 1921	United States of America	Exact date and location unknown
16	Win	16–0	Battling Troupe	KO	4 (10)	Jun 14, 1921	Business Men's A.C., Atlanta, Georgia, U.S.	
15	Win	15–0	Whitey Black	KO	1 (?)	Jun 6, 1921	United States of America	Exact date and location unknown
14	Win	14–0	Jim Fain	KO	4 (10)	May 23, 1921	Business Men's A.C., Atlanta, Georgia, U.S.	
13	Win	13–0	Chihuahua Kid Brown	KO	2 (?)	May 5, 1921	United States of America	Exact date and location unknown
12	Win	12–0	Chihuahua Kid Brown	TKO	8 (10)	May 2, 1921	Business Men's A.C., Atlanta, Georgia, U.S.	
11	Win	11–0	Battling Mims	PTS	10	Nov 9, 1920	Auditorium, Atlanta, Georgia, U.S.	
10	Win	10–0	Billy Hooper	PTS	10	Sep 27, 1920	Auditorium, Atlanta, Georgia, U.S.	
9	Win	9–0	Battling Mims	PTS	10	Apr 4, 1920	United States of America	Exact date and location unknown
8	Win	8–0	Billy Hooper	PTS	20	Mar 17, 1920	Brunswick, Georgia, U.S.	
7	Win	7–0	Sailor Darden	PTS	15	Mar 3, 1920	United States of America	Exact date and location unknown
6	Win	6–0	Roughhouse Baker	KO	3 (?)	Feb 2, 1919	United States of America	Exact date and location unknown
5	Win	5–0	Battling Mims	PTS	10	Jan 1, 1919	United States of America	Exact date and location unknown
4	Win	4–0	Battling Mims	PTS	15	Jun 6, 1918	United States of America	Exact date and location unknown
3	Win	3–0	Battling Hazel	KO	8 (?)	Apr 4, 1918	United States of America	Exact date and location unknown
2	Win	2–0	Battling Henry Williams	PTS	20	Mar 3, 1918	United States of America	Exact date and location unknown
1	Win	1–0	Billy Hooper	KO	11 (?)	Jan 1, 1918	Brunswick, Georgia, U.S.	Exact date unknown

=== Unofficial record ===
160 fights	135 wins	17 losses
By knockout	55	10
By decision	74	4
By disqualification	6	3
Draws	8	

Record with the inclusion of newspaper decisions to the win/loss/draw column.

No.	Result	Record	Opponent	Type	Round	Date	Location	Notes
160	Win	135–17–8	Leo Gates	TKO	4 (10)	Nov 12, 1927	Olympia Boxing Club, New York City, New York, U.S.	
159	Draw	134–17–8	Maxie Rosenbloom	PTS	10	Nov 9, 1927	Olympia Stadium, Detroit, Michigan, U.S.	
158	Win	134–17–7	Joe Lohman	NWS	10	Oct 17, 1927	Canton Auditorium, Canton, Ohio, U.S.	
157	Win	133–17–7	Pete Latzo	UD	10	Sep 30, 1927	Artillery Park, Wilkes-Barre, Pennsylvania, U.S.	
156	Win	132–17–7	Joe Anderson	PTS	10	Sep 1, 1927	Madison Square Garden, New York City, New York, U.S.	
155	Win	131–17–7	Jock Malone	PTS	6	Aug 16, 1927	Dugdale Park, Seattle, Washington, U.S.	
154	Win	130–17–7	Harry Dillon	PTS	10	Aug 10, 1927	Ice Coliseum, Portland, Oregon, U.S.	
153	Draw	129–17–7	Chuck Wiggins	PTS	10	Aug 3, 1927	Taylor Bowl, Newburgh Heights, Ohio, U.S.	
152	Win	129–17–6	Bing Conley	PTS	10	Jul 28, 1927	Amusement Park, Norwalk, Connecticut, U.S.	
151	Draw	128–17–6	Maxie Rosenbloom	PTS	10	Jul 4, 1927	Comiskey Park, Chicago, Illinois, U.S.	
150	Win	128–17–5	Bob Sage	PTS	10	Jun 17, 1927	Mack Park, Detroit, Michigan, U.S.	
149	Win	127–17–5	Eddie Huffman	PTS	10	May 27, 1927	Mechanics Building, Boston, Massachusetts, U.S.	
148	Win	126–17–5	Chuck Wiggins	NWS	10	May 13, 1927	Grand Rapids, Michigan, U.S.	
147	Win	125–17–5	Chuck Wiggins	PTS	10	Apr 29, 1927	Broadway Auditorium, Buffalo, New York, U.S.	
146	Win	124–17–5	Soldier George Jones	KO	1 (15)	Mar 29, 1927	Auditorium, Atlanta, Georgia, U.S.	
145	Win	123–17–5	Lou Bogash	PTS	10	Feb 18, 1927	Mechanics Building, Boston, Massachusetts, U.S.	
144	Win	122–17–5	Lee Anderson	PTS	4	Jan 25, 1927	Denver, Colorado, U.S.	
143	Loss	121–17–5	Leo Lomski	PTS	10	Jan 22, 1927	Wrigley Field, Los Angeles, California, U.S.	
142	Win	121–16–5	Tut Jackson	KO	3 (10)	Jan 6, 1927	Armory, Grand Rapids, Michigan, U.S.	
141	Loss	120–16–5	Mickey Walker	PTS	10	Dec 3, 1926	Coliseum, Chicago, Illinois, U.S.	Lost NYSAC, NBA, and The Ring middleweight titles
140	Win	120–15–5	Eddie Huffman	PTS	10	Nov 22, 1926	Coliseum, Chicago, Illinois, U.S.	
139	Loss	119–15–5	Maxie Rosenbloom	DQ	9 (10)	Oct 15, 1926	Mechanics Building, Boston, Massachusetts, U.S.	
138	Win	119–14–5	Happy Hunter	KO	3 (8)	Sep 16, 1926	Memphis, Tennessee, U.S.	
137	Win	118–14–5	Harry Greb	SD	15	Aug 19, 1926	Madison Square Garden, New York City, New York, U.S.	Retained NYSAC, NBA, and The Ring middleweight titles
136	Win	117–14–5	Battling Jim McCreary	DQ	3 (10)	Aug 10, 1926	Auditorium, Atlanta, Georgia, U.S.	
135	Win	116–14–5	Eddie Huffman	PTS	10	Jul 24, 1926	Ascot Park, Los Angeles, California, U.S.	
134	Win	115–14–5	Lee Anderson	KO	2 (?)	Jul 11, 1926	Coliseum, Ciudad Juarez, Chihuahua, Mexico	
133	Win	114–14–5	Ray Neuman	PTS	10	Jun 28, 1926	Braves Field, Boston, Massachusetts, U.S.	
132	Win	113–14–5	Young Bob Fitzsimmons	NWS	10	Jun 18, 1926	Boyle's Thirty Acres, Jersey City, New Jersey, U.S.	
131	Win	112–14–5	Allentown Joe Gans	UD	10	Apr 16, 1926	South Main Street Armory, Wilkes-Barre, Pennsylvania, U.S.	
130	Win	111–14–5	Harry Greb	SD	15	Feb 26, 1926	Madison Square Garden, New York City, New York, U.S.	Won NYSAC, NBA, and The Ring middleweight titles
129	Loss	110–14–5	Mike McTigue	SD	10	Dec 23, 1925	Madison Square Garden, New York City, New York, U.S.	
128	Win	110–13–5	Frank Moody	PTS	10	Dec 10, 1925	Mechanics Building, Boston, Massachusetts, U.S.	
127	Win	109–13–5	Benny Ross	PTS	6	Nov 30, 1925	Broadway Auditorium, Buffalo, New York, U.S.	
126	Loss	108–13–5	Chuck Wiggins	NWS	10	Oct 27, 1925	East Chicago, Indiana, U.S.	
125	Win	108–12–5	Jock Malone	NWS	10	Oct 23, 1925	Auditorium, Saint Paul, Minnesota, U.S.	
124	Win	107–12–5	Ted Moore	TKO	6 (10)	Sep 7, 1925	Taylor Bowl, Newburgh Heights, Ohio, U.S.	
123	Win	106–12–5	Jock Malone	PTS	10	Aug 28, 1925	Braves Field, Boston, Massachusetts, U.S.	
122	Win	105–12–5	Allentown Joe Gans	NWS	10	Aug 21, 1925	Grand Rapids, Michigan, U.S.	
121	Win	104–12–5	Lou Bogash	NWS	10	Jul 24, 1925	Aurora Bowl, Aurora, Illinois, U.S.	
120	Win	103–12–5	Pat McCarthy	PTS	10	Jul 20, 1925	Braves Field, Boston, Massachusetts, U.S.	
119	Win	102–12–5	Jack Stone	TKO	4 (12)	Jun 26, 1925	Elizabeth, New Jersey, U.S.	
118	Win	101–12–5	Lee Anderson	DQ	3 (10)	Jun 20, 1925	Commonwealth Sporting Club, New York City, New York, U.S.	
117	Win	100–12–5	Lee Anderson	UD	10	Jun 8, 1925	Shibe Park, Philadelphia, Pennsylvania, U.S.	
116	Win	99–12–5	Jock Malone	NWS	10	Jun 5, 1925	East Chicago, Indiana, U.S.	
115	Win	98–12–5	Lou Bogash	PTS	12	May 26, 1925	State Street Arena, Bridgeport, Connecticut, U.S.	
114	Win	97–12–5	Pal Reed	PTS	10	May 18, 1925	Mechanics Building, Boston, Massachusetts, U.S.	
113	Win	96–12–5	Battling Mims	KO	5 (?)	May 4, 1925	Macon, Georgia, U.S.	
112	Win	95–12–5	Lou Bogash	KO	5 (12)	Apr 29, 1925	Savannah, Georgia, U.S.	
111	Win	94–12–5	Lou Bogash	PTS	10	Mar 20, 1925	Mechanics Building, Boston, Massachusetts, U.S.	
110	Win	93–12–5	Sailor Darden	NWS	12	Mar 16, 1925	Coliseum, Toledo, Ohio, U.S.	
109	Loss	92–12–5	Jack Delaney	KO	4 (12)	Feb 26, 1925	Madison Square Garden, New York City, New York, U.S.	
108	Loss	92–11–5	Lou Bogash	DQ	3 (10)	Feb 16, 1925	Mechanics Building, Boston, Massachusetts, U.S.	
107	Win	92–10–5	Jackie Clark	TKO	5 (12)	Feb 14, 1925	Commonwealth Sporting Club, New York City, New York, U.S.	
106	Win	91–10–5	Jamaica Kid	TKO	10 (12)	Feb 5, 1925	Lakeside Park Pavillion, Dayton, Ohio, U.S.	
105	Win	90–10–5	Ted Moore	NWS	12	Feb 2, 1925	Sussex Avenue Armory, Newark, New Jersey, U.S.	
104	Win	89–10–5	Bill Savage	KO	2 (10)	Jan 29, 1925	Marieville Gardens, North Providence, Rhode Island, U.S.	
103	Win	88–10–5	Tommy Robson	TKO	8 (12)	Jan 28, 1925	Mechanics Building, Boston, Massachusetts, U.S.	
102	Loss	87–10–5	Jack Delaney	KO	2 (12)	Jan 16, 1925	Madison Square Garden, New York City, New York, U.S.	
101	Win	87–9–5	Dan O'Dowd	TKO	6 (10)	Jan 7, 1925	Marieville Gardens, North Providence, Rhode Island, U.S.	
100	Win	86–9–5	Billy Britton	TKO	4 (10)	Jan 5, 1925	Mechanics Building, Boston, Massachusetts, U.S.	
99	Win	85–9–5	Joe Lohman	TKO	3 (10)	Jan 1, 1925	Rink S.C., Brooklyn, New York City, New York, U.S.	
98	Draw	84–9–5	Frankie Schoell	PTS	6	Dec 26, 1924	Broadway Auditorium, Buffalo, New York, U.S.	
97	Win	84–9–4	Jack Townsend	TKO	5 (10)	Dec 15, 1924	Arena, Philadelphia, Pennsylvania, U.S.	
96	Win	83–9–4	Johnny Wilson	TKO	3 (10)	Dec 9, 1924	Madison Square Garden, New York City, New York, U.S.	
95	Win	82–9–4	Battling Gahee	TKO	2 (12)	Dec 1, 1924	Columbus, Ohio, U.S.	
94	Win	81–9–4	Clem Johnson	NWS	12	Nov 27, 1924	Canton Auditorium, Canton, Ohio, U.S.	
93	Win	80–9–4	Jerry Hayes	KO	2 (4)	Nov 10, 1924	Arena, Philadelphia, Pennsylvania, U.S.	
92	Win	79–9–4	Hughie Clements	TKO	2 (4)	Nov 10, 1924	Arena, Philadelphia, Pennsylvania, U.S.	
91	Win	78–9–4	George Robinson	PTS	12	Nov 1, 1924	Commonwealth Sporting Club, New York City, New York, U.S.	
90	Win	77–9–4	Joe Lohman	DQ	4 (10)	Oct 23, 1924	Moose Arena, Hamilton, Ohio, U.S.	
89	Win	76–9–4	Cleve Hawkins	KO	3 (?)	Oct 21, 1924	Auditorium, Atlanta, Georgia, U.S.	
88	Win	75–9–4	Jamaica Kid	TKO	8 (12)	Oct 11, 1924	Commonwealth Sporting Club, New York City, New York, U.S.	
87	Win	74–9–4	Battling Gahee	TKO	4 (12)	Sep 30, 1924	Weller Theater, Zanesville, Ohio, U.S.	
86	Win	73–9–4	Tut Jackson	KO	2 (12)	Sep 29, 1924	Canton Auditorium, Canton, Ohio, U.S.	
85	Win	72–9–4	Lee Anderson	UD	12	Sep 22, 1924	Columbus, Ohio, U.S.	
84	Win	71–9–4	Jamaica Kid	UD	12	Sep 15, 1924	Columbus, Ohio, U.S.	
83	Win	70–9–4	Tut Jackson	TKO	8 (10)	Sep 1, 1924	League Park, Martins Ferry, Ohio, U.S.	
82	Loss	69–9–4	Harry Greb	NWS	10	Aug 21, 1924	Legion Stadium, Fremont, Ohio, U.S.	
81	Win	69–8–4	Oscar Mortimer	TKO	6 (12)	Aug 12, 1924	Soledad Roof, San Antonio, Texas, U.S.	
80	Win	68–8–4	Jack Townsend	TKO	11 (12)	Aug 2, 1924	Commonwealth Sporting Club, New York City, New York, U.S.	
79	Win	67–8–4	Jamaica Kid	DQ	3 (12)	Jul 22, 1924	Riverside Arena, Covington, Kentucky, U.S.	
78	Win	66–8–4	Lee Anderson	DQ	11 (12)	Jul 3, 1924	Municipal Auditorium, Atlanta, Georgia, U.S.	
77	Win	65–8–4	Jamaica Kid	NWS	10	Jun 27, 1924	Grand Rapids, Michigan, U.S.	
76	Win	64–8–4	Battling Gahee	NWS	10	Jun 20, 1924	Fremont Theatre, Fremont, Ohio, U.S.	
75	Win	63–8–4	Joe Lohman	PTS	12	Jun 14, 1924	Commonwealth Sporting Club, New York City, New York, U.S.	
74	Win	62–8–4	Willie Walker	TKO	7 (12)	May 14, 1924	Commonwealth Sporting Club, New York City, New York, U.S.	
73	Win	61–8–4	Ted Jamieson	PTS	12	May 3, 1924	Commonwealth Sporting Club, New York City, New York, U.S.	
72	Win	60–8–4	George Robinson	PTS	12	Apr 29, 1924	Auditorium, Atlanta, Georgia, U.S.	
71	Win	59–8–4	Jimmy Darcy	PTS	12	Apr 19, 1924	Commonwealth Sporting Club, New York City, New York, U.S.	
70	Win	58–8–4	Dave Thornton	KO	2 (?)	Apr 9, 1924	Bijou Ring, Nashville, Tennessee, U.S.	
69	Win	57–8–4	Lee Anderson	PTS	12	Mar 29, 1924	Commonwealth Sporting Club, New York City, New York, U.S.	
68	Win	56–8–4	Bob Lawson	KO	6 (8)	Mar 19, 1924	Nashville, Tennessee, U.S.	
67	Win	55–8–4	Jamaica Kid	NWS	10	Mar 3, 1924	Fremont Theatre, Fremont, Ohio, U.S.	
66	Win	54–8–4	Battling Gahee	PTS	12	Feb 25, 1924	Barberton Stadium, Barberton, Ohio, U.S.	
65	Win	53–8–4	Bob Lawson	TKO	10 (12)	Feb 18, 1924	Coliseum, Toledo, Ohio, U.S.	
64	Win	52–8–4	Sonny Goodrich	PTS	12	Jan 31, 1924	Bellinger Theater, San Antonio, Texas, U.S.	
63	Win	51–8–4	Herbert Moore	KO	2 (?)	Jan 23, 1924	Nashville, Tennessee, U.S.	
62	Win	50–8–4	Sailor Darden	PTS	12	Dec 28, 1923	Auditorium, Atlanta, Georgia, U.S.	
61	Win	49–8–4	Rufe Cameron	KO	4 (?)	Dec 6, 1923	United States of America	Exact date and location unknown
60	Draw	48–8–4	George Robinson	PTS	12	Nov 27, 1923	Auditorium, Atlanta, Georgia, U.S.	
59	Loss	48–8–3	Fireman Jim Flynn	RTD	5 (?)	Sep 17, 1923	Mexico City, Distrito Federal, Mexico	
58	Win	48–7–3	Jamaica Kid	PTS	10	Sep 4, 1923	Auditorium, Atlanta, Georgia, U.S.	
57	Win	47–7–3	Whitey Black	NWS	10	Jul 30, 1923	Danceland Arena, Detroit, Michigan, U.S.	
56	Win	46–7–3	Tut Jackson	PTS	12	Jul 18, 1923	Springfield, Ohio, U.S.	
55	Draw	45–7–3	Tut Jackson	PTS	12	Jul 3, 1923	Auditorium, Atlanta, Georgia, U.S.	
54	Win	45–7–2	Rufe Cameron	PTS	10	Jun 20, 1923	Bijou Ring, Nashville, Tennessee, U.S.	
53	Win	44–7–2	Panama Joe Gans	NWS	12	May 25, 1923	Coliseum, Toledo, Ohio, U.S.	
52	Win	43–7–2	Sailor Tom King	PTS	15	May 15, 1923	Ciudad Juarez, Chihuahua, Mexico	
51	Loss	42–7–2	Kid Norfolk	KO	1 (12)	May 8, 1923	Springfield, Ohio, U.S.	For world colored light-heavyweight title
50	Win	42–6–2	Jamaica Kid	NWS	12	Apr 20, 1923	Coliseum, Toledo, Ohio, U.S.	
49	Win	41–6–2	Jack Ray	KO	3 (?)	Mar 19, 1923	Central Garage Arena, Nashville, Tennessee, U.S.	
48	Win	40–6–2	Battling Mims	PTS	8	Feb 28, 1923	Nashville, Tennessee, U.S.	
47	Win	39–6–2	Bob Lawson	PTS	8	Feb 21, 1923	Nashville, Tennessee, U.S.	
46	Win	38–6–2	Frank Carbone	DQ	10 (15)	Dec 22, 1922	Ciudad Juarez, Chihuahua, Mexico	
45	Win	37–6–2	Eddie Palmer	TKO	10 (15)	Dec 13, 1922	Coliseum Arena, New Orleans, Louisiana, U.S.	
44	Win	36–6–2	Kid Davis	KO	3 (10)	Dec 1, 1922	L Street Park, Brunswick, Georgia, U.S.	
43	Win	35–6–2	Eddie Palmer	PTS	8	Nov 11, 1922	Memphis, Tennessee, U.S.	Exact date unknown
42	Win	34–6–2	Battling Gahee	PTS	8	Oct 10, 1922	Memphis, Tennessee, U.S.	
41	Win	33–6–2	Kid Davis	KO	1 (?)	Sep 9, 1922	United States of America	Exact date and location unknown
40	Win	32–6–2	Kid Paddy	KO	1 (?)	Aug 30, 1922	United States of America	Exact date and location unknown
39	Win	31–6–2	Andy Kid Palmer	PTS	15	Aug 22, 1922	Ciudad Juarez, Chihuahua, Mexico	
38	Loss	30–6–2	Jamaica Kid	RTD	2 (12)	Jul 26, 1922	Riverside Arena, Covington, Kentucky, U.S.	
37	Draw	30–5–2	Kid Norfolk	PTS	8	Jul 4, 1922	Memphis, Tennessee, U.S.	
36	Loss	30–5–1	Sam Langford	KO	2 (10)	Jun 5, 1922	Ponce de Leon Ballpark, Atlanta, Georgia, U.S.	
35	Win	30–4–1	Frankie Murphy	PTS	15	May 16, 1922	Ciudad Juarez, Chihuahua, Mexico	
34	Loss	29–4–1	Lee Anderson	KO	7 (15)	May 9, 1922	Ciudad Juarez, Chihuahua, Mexico	For vacant world colored light-heavyweight title
33	Win	29–3–1	Billy Britton	PTS	15	Apr 11, 1922	Ciudad Juarez, Chihuahua, Mexico	
32	Win	28–3–1	Jim Jam Barry	KO	5 (15)	Mar 28, 1922	Ciudad Juarez, Chihuahua, Mexico	
31	Win	27–3–1	Chihuahua Kid Brown	KO	1 (15)	Mar 21, 1922	Ciudad Juarez, Chihuahua, Mexico	
30	Draw	26–3–1	Jim Jam Barry	PTS	15	Mar 7, 1922	Garden Play Arena, Ciudad Juarez, Chihuahua, Mexico	
29	Win	26–3	Gorilla Jones	KO	9 (15)	Feb 21, 1922	Gonzalez Garden Arena, Ciudad Juarez, Chihuahua, Mexico	Won vacant Southwest middleweight title Not to be confused with Gorilla Jones
28	Loss	25–3	Kid Norfolk	KO	3 (10)	Jan 30, 1922	Auditorium, Atlanta, Georgia, U.S.	
27	Win	25–2	Battling Burke	KO	4 (8)	Jan 11, 1922	Nashville, Tennessee, U.S.	
26	Win	24–2	Jack Ray	KO	2 (?)	Jan 1, 1922	United States of America	Exact date and location unknown
25	Loss	23–2	Panama Joe Gans	KO	5 (15)	Dec 15, 1921	Auditorium, Atlanta, Georgia, U.S.	
24	Win	23–1	Battling Gahee	PTS	8	Nov 8, 1921	Memphis, Tennessee, U.S.	
23	Win	22–1	Whitey Black	PTS	8	Oct 24, 1921	Memphis, Tennessee, U.S.	
22	Win	21–1	Battling Gahee	PTS	10	Oct 18, 1921	Business Men's A.C., Atlanta, Georgia, U.S.	
21	Win	20–1	Chihuahua Kid Brown	KO	3 (10)	Sep 26, 1921	Auditorium, Atlanta, Georgia, U.S.	
20	Loss	19–1	Panama Joe Gans	KO	6 (15)	Aug 8, 1921	Auditorium, Atlanta, Georgia, U.S.	
19	Win	19–0	Kid Williams	KO	3 (?)	Aug 1, 1921	United States of America	Exact date and location unknown
18	Win	18–0	Jack Moore	KO	2 (12)	Jul 12, 1921	Pekin Theatre, Savannah, Georgia, U.S.	
17	Win	17–0	Battling Mims	PTS	10	Jul 7, 1921	United States of America	Exact date and location unknown
16	Win	16–0	Battling Troupe	KO	4 (10)	Jun 14, 1921	Business Men's A.C., Atlanta, Georgia, U.S.	
15	Win	15–0	Whitey Black	KO	1 (?)	Jun 6, 1921	United States of America	Exact date and location unknown
14	Win	14–0	Jim Fain	KO	4 (10)	May 23, 1921	Business Men's A.C., Atlanta, Georgia, U.S.	
13	Win	13–0	Chihuahua Kid Brown	KO	2 (?)	May 5, 1921	United States of America	Exact date and location unknown
12	Win	12–0	Chihuahua Kid Brown	TKO	8 (10)	May 2, 1921	Business Men's A.C., Atlanta, Georgia, U.S.	
11	Win	11–0	Battling Mims	PTS	10	Nov 9, 1920	Auditorium, Atlanta, Georgia, U.S.	
10	Win	10–0	Billy Hooper	PTS	10	Sep 27, 1920	Auditorium, Atlanta, Georgia, U.S.	
9	Win	9–0	Battling Mims	PTS	10	Apr 4, 1920	United States of America	Exact date and location unknown
8	Win	8–0	Billy Hooper	PTS	20	Mar 17, 1920	Brunswick, Georgia, U.S.	
7	Win	7–0	Sailor Darden	PTS	15	Mar 3, 1920	United States of America	Exact date and location unknown
6	Win	6–0	Roughhouse Baker	KO	3 (?)	Feb 2, 1919	United States of America	Exact date and location unknown
5	Win	5–0	Battling Mims	PTS	10	Jan 1, 1919	United States of America	Exact date and location unknown
4	Win	4–0	Battling Mims	PTS	15	Jun 6, 1918	United States of America	Exact date and location unknown
3	Win	3–0	Battling Hazel	KO	8 (?)	Apr 4, 1918	United States of America	Exact date and location unknown
2	Win	2–0	Battling Henry Williams	PTS	20	Mar 3, 1918	United States of America	Exact date and location unknown
1	Win	1–0	Billy Hooper	KO	11 (?)	Jan 1, 1918	Brunswick, Georgia, U.S.	Exact date unknown

== Titles in boxing ==
=== Major world titles ===
- NYSAC middleweight champion (160 lbs)
- NBA (WBA) middleweight champion (160 lbs)

=== The Ring magazine titles ===
- The Ring middleweight champion (160 lbs)

=== Regional/International titles ===
- Southwest middleweight champion (160 lbs)

=== Undisputed titles ===
- Undisputed middleweight champion

== See also ==
- List of middleweight boxing champions

Achievements
Preceded by Harry Greb	World Middleweight Champion; February 26, 1926 – December 3, 1926	Succeeded by Mickey Walker
Middleweight status
Preceded by Harry Greb	Latest born world champion to die November 16, 1927 – October 29, 1949	Succeeded by Marcel Cerdan
