= Roddie MacDonald (boxer) =

Canadian boxer (1894–1961)

Personal information
- Nickname: Big Pay
- Nationality: (Canada) Canadian
- Born: Roderick MacDonald; 1894 Springhill, Nova Scotia, Canada
- Died: July 1961 (aged 66–67) Canada
- Height: 5 ft 9½ in (177cm)
- Weight: Middleweight

Boxing career
- Stance: Orthodox

Boxing record
- Total fights: 77
- Wins: 35
- Win by KO: 25
- Losses: 23
- Draws: 18

Roddie MacDonald (1894 – July 1961) was a Canadian former professional middleweight boxer who won the Canadian middleweight boxing championship in 1916.

== Early life ==
Roderick MacDonald was born in 1894 in Springhill, Nova Scotia, Canada.

== Professional career ==
In 1913, Roddie MacDonald made his American debut, fighting his first three bouts in Massachusetts, recording two losses and one draw.

He fought a series of bouts in Nova Scotia in his quest for the Canadian middleweight championship. In February 1914, he notably knocked out Mike "Twin" Sullivan in the fourth round.

=== Taking the Canadian middleweight championship, October 1916 ===
MacDonald faced Johnny Howard for the Canadian middleweight championship on October 12, 1916. After a thirteenth-round knockout of Howard, the Canadian titleholder campaigned in the United States until the summer of 1917.

==== Notable bouts during Canadian middleweight title reign ====
From 1917 to 1920, he frequently fought in Halifax, Nova Scotia. He registered a knockout over Philadelphia middleweight Art Magirl in June 1917 and later in July won his fourth and final bout against Johnny Wilson, who would go on to claim the world middleweight championship.

MacDonald, described as a "rushing, slugging battler, packing a terrific punch in either hand," fought New York middleweight Marty Cross twice in 1919.

He fought to a draw with Leo Florian Hauck after 15 rounds on February 20, 1919. The Nova Scotian boxer captured a win over Hauck on February 3, 1920.

He notably faced future world light heavyweight champion Mike McTigue in Halifax, Nova Scotia, on February 17, 1920, where he was disqualified in the eleventh round of a fifteen-round match. Despite being knocked down five times and enduring one of the worst beatings of his career, MacDonald earned admiration for his toughness and refusal to quit. The match was awarded to McTigue when MacDonald's unintentional low blow prevented him from continuing.

=== Loss against reigning Canadian middleweight champion Eugene Brosseau, March 1920 ===
He met reigning Canadian middleweight champion Eugene Brosseau in Halifax on March 2, 1920, where he was stopped for the first time in his career in round 14 of 15. The fight represented the first time the Canadian middleweight title was fought for in the Maritime Provinces.

The middleweight contender had moved to Montreal in the early 1920s to train and fight under new management.

=== Title match with Mike McTigue, November 1921 ===
He faced Mike McTigue in a Quebec City rematch for the Canadian middleweight championship on November 10, 1921. He was knocked out in the tenth round, losing his bid for the title.

His loss to McTigue was followed by a 10-round draw and three straight losses. After a year-long layoff, he resumed fighting in Alberta between 1925 and 1927, appearing in Lethbridge, Drumheller, Ponoka, and Castor, where he compiled a 1-5-1 record.

Roddie defeated former middleweight and light heavyweight champion Jack Reddick in his final pro fight on June 5, 1928, winning on a points decision.

In July 1928, during an exhibition bout in Sydney, Nova Scotia, against Roy Mitchell, he was stopped in the ninth round after being knocked down four times.

== Professional boxing record ==
76 fights	35 wins	23 losses
By knockout	25	5
By decision	10	18
Draws	18	

== Death ==
Roddie MacDonald died in July 1961.

== Legacy ==
Roddie MacDonald was an original inductee of the Nova Scotia Sports Hall of Fame.

Achievements
Preceded by Billy McGrandle	Canadian Middleweight Champion; October 12, 1916 – March 2, 1920	Succeeded by Eugene Brosseau
