= World Colored Light Heavyweight Championship =

The World Colored Light Heavyweight Championship was a title created in 1921, when African American boxers were prevented from contending for the world light heavyweight title by the color bar.

On 30 May 1921, Kid Norfolk fought Lee Anderson for the new colored light heavyweight title in a scheduled 10-round bout in Phoenix, Arizona. Anderson won on a T.K.O. when Norfolk returned to his corner in the ninth round, being unable to continue to fight. (They would meet another three times in non-title bouts between 1922 and 1924, and The Kid prevailed each time.)

Anderson defended the title on the Fourth of July 1921 in a 10-round bout in Phoenix, Arizona, beating Rough House Ware on points.

When Norfolk fought The Jamaica Kid on 20 December 1921 at Madison Square Garden in New York City, he had claimed the world colored light heavyweight title. He beat the Jamaica Kid on points in an eight-round bout. In Atlanta on 30 January 1922, Norfolk faced Tiger Flowers, the boxer who would become the first African American world middleweight champ in 1926, K.O.-ing him in third round of a 10-rounder. He apparently had vacated the title when he met reigning colored heavyweight champ Harry Wills on 2 March 1922 in Madison Square Garden in New York City for a 15-round bout, losing to the great champion via a K.O. in the second round. Wills outweighed him by 25¾ lbs.

On May 9 of that year, Lee Anderson took on Tiger Flowers in Ciudad Juarez, Mexico for a 15-round bout to determine the colored light heavyweight title. Anderson won his second colored crown when he K.O.-ed Flowers in the seventh round.

Anderson apparently vacated the title in turn, and Kid Norfolk took the crown title for the second time one day short of a year later, on 8 Mary 1923, when he K.O.-ed Tiger Flowers at 2:50 in the first round of a scheduled 12-rounder in Springfield, Ohio. The title then went into abeyance.

Battling Siki became the first black world light heavyweight champion in 1922.

== List of champions ==
#	Name	Reign	Date	Days held	Location	Defenses	Notes
1	Lee Anderson	1	May 30, 1921	Unknown	Phoenix, Arizona; USA	1	Defeated Kid Norfolk by a TKO in the 9th round.
2	Kid Norfolk	0	December 20, 1921	Unknown	New York City; USA	0	Defeated The Jamaica Kid for vacated title.
3	Lee Anderson	2	May 9, 1922	Unknown	Ciudad Juarez, Chihuahua; USA	0	Defeated Tiger Flowers for vacated title.
4	Kid Norfolk	2	May 8, 1923	Unknown	Springfield, Ohio; USA	0	Title became defunct.

== See also ==
- World Colored Heavyweight Championship
- World Colored Middleweight Championship
- World Colored Welterweight Championship
