= Jack Reddick =

Canadian boxer (1901-1951)

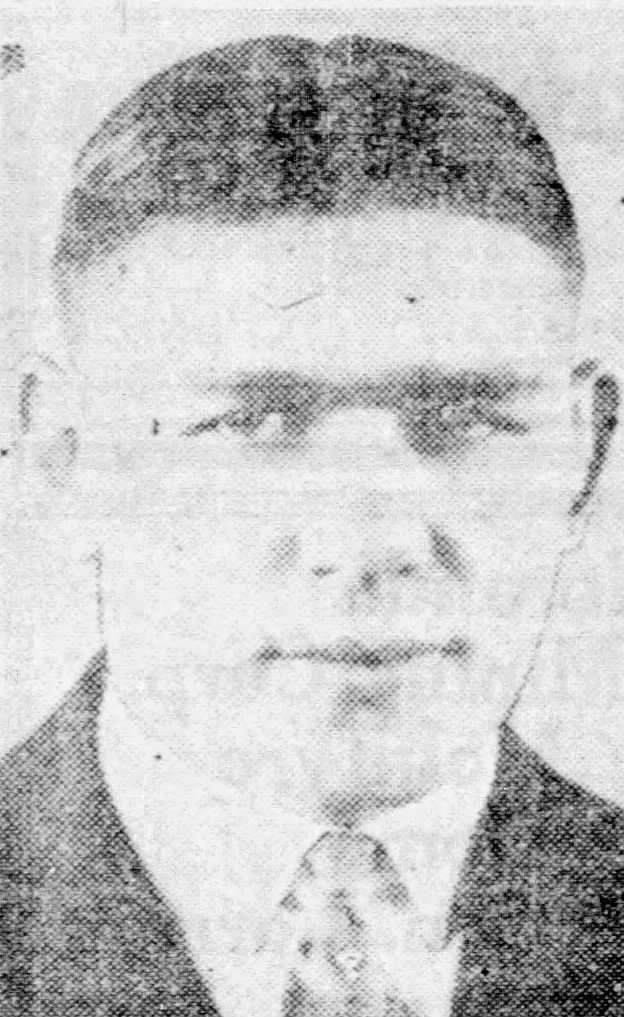

Personal information
- Nickname: The Moose Jaw Mauler
- Nationality: Canadian
- Born: John Runner Jr. 1901 Des Moines, Iowa, U.S.
- Died: April 14, 1951 (aged 49–50) Treherne, Manitoba, Canada
- Height: 5 ft 9 in (177cm)
- Weight: Middleweight; Light heavyweight

Boxing career
- Stance: Orthodox

Boxing record
- Total fights: 55
- Wins: 36
- Win by KO: 25
- Losses: 13
- Draws: 5

John Runner Jr. (1901 – April 16, 1951), better known as Jack Reddick, was a Canadian former professional light heavyweight boxer who fought between 1922 and 1928. Nicknamed the Moose Jaw Mauler, he held the Canadian middleweight and light heavyweight boxing titles in the 1920s.

== Early life ==
John Runner Jr. was born in Des Moines, Iowa, and moved to Winnipeg, Manitoba.

== Professional career ==
In summer 1921, Reddick turned pro in Winnipeg, fighting as a middleweight. He traveled to Saskatoon in late 1922 to arrange a boxing match but was unable to secure a suitable opponent due to unforeseen circumstances. He returned to Winnipeg, where his manager William Black sent him to train with boxer and trainer Jimmie Potts in Minneapolis. Reddick trained six weeks with Potts, who had fought Jimmy Britt and trained notable fighters including Fred Fulton and the Gibbons brothers. By December 1922, he had 18 months as a professional and victories over Bill McKenzie, Kid Whitey, Art Allan, and Billy Burke.

Reddick was billed as the middleweight champion of Western Canada in 1922.

Fighting out of Moose Jaw, Saskatchewan, he opened and managed the Moose Jaw Athletic Association, with its first club show held on February 1, 1923.

He traveled to California in April 1923, where he fought Fred Cullen at Hollywood Legion Stadium, marking his first appearance on the West Coast. He was introduced by Dan Tobey as the Canadian champion at the 158-pound weight class.

The middleweight title stayed in his possession after a June 1923 draw versus Minneapolis's Mark Moore. As the main event of Moose Jaw's largest boxing card at that time, the fight attracted over two thousand attendees to the stadium rink.

=== Taking the Canadian light heavyweight championship, April 1924 ===
Reddick first challenged for the Canadian light heavyweight title against Soldier Jones at the Arena Gardens in April 1924. He knocked out Jones in the fifth round and again in their rematch on July 14, 1924. 16 days later, he retained his Canadian title after an eighth-round knockout of Joe Edwards, light heavyweight champion of Ohio. By this time, Reddick had offers to fight in England and was in demand across the United States.

=== Losing the Canadian light heavyweight championship to Bob Fox, October 1925 ===
Reddick lost his belt to light heavyweight champion of Western Canada Bob Fox in October 1925 following a disqualification after being warned for low blows.

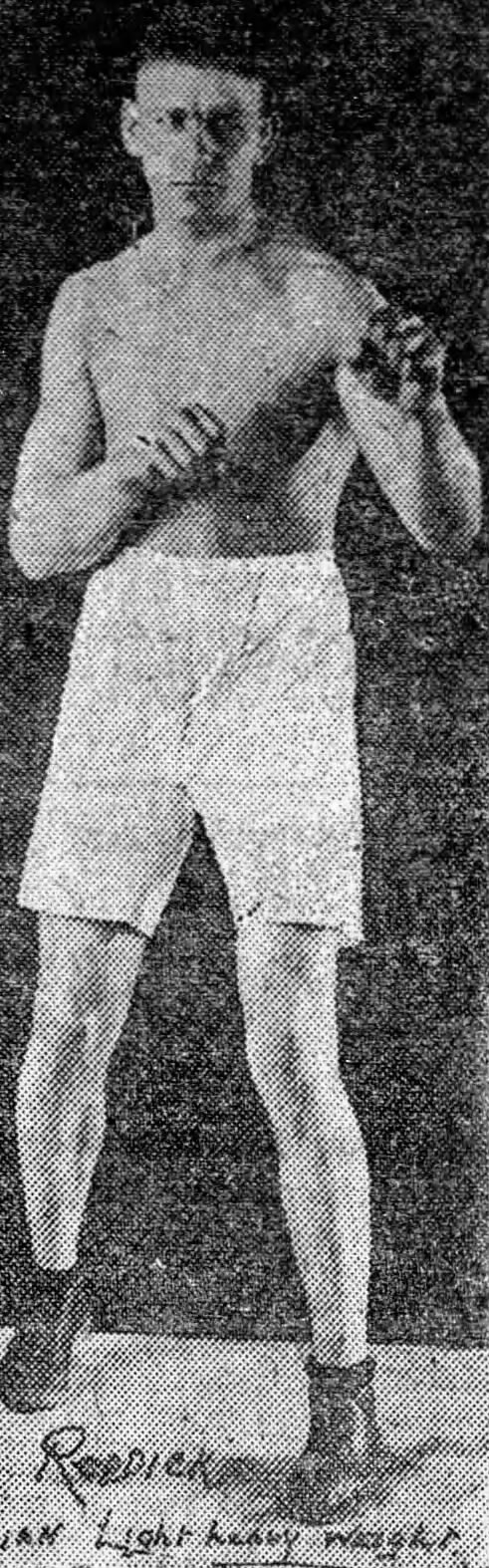
Jack Reddick, Light Heavyweight, 1926

Reddick, advised by Young Stribling, faced world light heavyweight champion Paul Berlenbach at Madison Square Garden in September 1924. His opponent knocked him out in the eighth round.

In April 1925, the Canadian light-heavyweight and middleweight champion fought world middleweight champion Harry Greb, who held a record of 240-17-17. He lost the ten-round catchweight bout at Arena Gardens on a points decision. His reputation was enhanced rather than damaged by his loss at the hands of Greb.

He defeated Carl Augustine and fought to a draw with unbeaten Del Fontaine in May 1925. His third fight that month pitted him against light heavyweight champion Kid Norfolk in a twelve-rounder in Moose Jaw. Jack's brother, Bob Runner, became his press agent and helped arrange the fight.

Reddick, the light heavyweight titleholder, faced Roy Mitchell, the light heavyweight and heavyweight champion of the Maritime Provinces, on April 23, 1926. The $1,500 offered to Reddick for the bout was the largest amount ever paid to bring a boxer to Halifax at that time. He was stopped by Mitchell in the third round of the non-title bout in Halifax, Nova Scotia.

After three and a half years in the professional ranks, Reddick announced his retirement in May 1926 at age 23. Explaining his decision, he stated that boxing was "too tough a racket" for anyone who could make a living otherwise. He earned and saved enough from his fights to invest in property and a hotel business in Winnipeg, where he planned to focus his efforts.

The former champion came out of retirement after six months in a return bout against Al Anderson in November 1926. He was disqualified in the seventh round following warnings for hitting after being told to break.

His last fight came against Roddie MacDonald in June 1928 in Drumheller where he lost on points.

== Professional boxing record ==
| 54 fights | 36 wins | 13 losses |
|---|---|---|
| By knockout | 25 | 4 |
| By decision | 11 | 9 |
| Draws | 5 | |

== Death ==
Jack Reddick died in Treherne, Manitoba on April 14, 1951, at 50. He was killed in a motor vehicle accident.
