= Eddie Palmer (boxer) =

American boxer

Eddie Palmer was an African American boxer who held the World Colored Welterweight and World Colored Middleweight titles. Born in New Orleans, Louisiana in 1892, the 5'9" Palmer fought at a weight of between 142 and 156 lbs. out of Philadelphia and New Orleans between 1910 and 1925. He moved to Philadelphia in August 1911 and fought out of the City of Brotherly Love for two years.

While based in Philadelphia, he twice fought future world light-heavyweight champ Battling Levinsky in 1912, scoring no decisions in both fights. In the later part of his career, he fought future world middleweight champ Tiger Flowers in 1922, losing both fights.

Palmer declared himself the World Colored Welterweight Champion in 1912 after fighting Young Tommy Coleman to a no-decision in a six-round bout in New York City on 26 September 1912. They had met four times since 3 October 1911, when Coleman won a newspaper decision in a six-round bout in Philadelphia. Palmer had won their second match while their third match was reported variously as a draw and a newspaper decision for Coleman. When they met for a rematch four days later on September 30 in Scranton, Pennsylvania, the Wilkes-Barre Times Leader gave the decision to Coleman. Later that year, in an exhibition held on December 9, he killed Kid Harris in the ring. He only fought twice in 1913, but fought 11 times in 1914. He successfully defended his colored welterweight title on 4 March 1914 against Kyle Whitney in New Orleans, winning on points in a 20-rounder. His next defense was on 15 February 1915 in New Orleans against "The Fighting Gorilla, who out-pointed him in their 20-round contest. In his next fight, on 1 May 1915, Palmer won the World Colored Middleweight Championship by K.O.ing Willie Langford in the 14th round of a scheduled 20-round bout in New Orleans.

Palmer successfully defended his Colored Middleweight Title twice against Young Kid McCoy, once in 1915 and once in 1916, winning both fights by knock out. He continued to fight regularly until 1922, when he lost two fights to Tiger Flowers. He made a comeback in 1925, but lost both of his fights. Another comeback attempt in 1928, in which he fought USA Arizona State light-heavyweight title holder Owen Phelps in Comiskey Park, ended in a loss.

In 1929, he fought in New Orleans, winning the first three of his four fights that year against lightly regarded opponents. He retired after losing his last fight to a welterweight with a career record of 45 wins (21 by K.O.) against 23 losses (K.O.ed five times) and two draws. He had 24 newspaper decisions, winning 14, losing five and drawing five.

Awards and achievements
Preceded by New title	World Colored Welterweight Championship; September 26, 1912 - February 15, 1915	Succeeded by Gorilla Jones
Preceded by Sam Langford	World Colored Middleweight Championship; May 1, 1915 - May 19, 1916	Succeeded by Jamaica Kid
