= Del Fontaine =

Canadian boxer

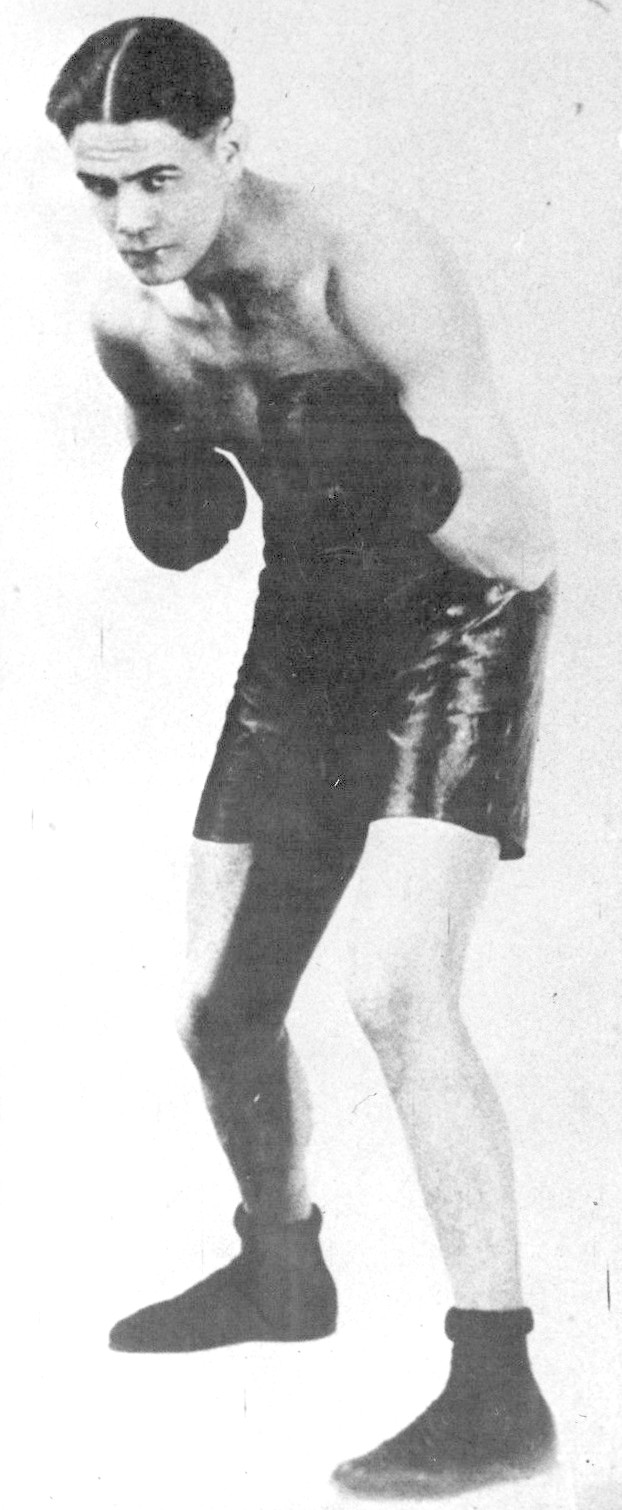

Personal information
- Born: Raymond Henry Bousquet; 22 February 1904 Winnipeg, Manitoba, Canada
- Died: 29 October 1935 (aged 31) Wandsworth Prison, London, England
- Weight: Middleweight

Boxing career

Boxing record
- Total fights: 102
- Wins: 53
- Win by KO: 36
- Losses: 38
- Draws: 9
- No contests: 2

Del Fontaine ne Raymond Henry Bousquet (22 February 1904 – 29 October 1935) was a Canadian boxer who fought between 1925 and 1935. He is most notable within boxing for winning the Canadian middleweight boxing championship in 1926 and again in 1931. In 1932 he travelled to Britain to continue his boxing career, and began a relationship with Hilda Meeks of Bristol. In 1935, Fontaine was arrested and convicted of the murder of Miss Meeks and was hanged at Wandsworth Prison.

Fontaine's boxing style was described as aggressive and crowd-pleasing, but with a poor regard for defence.

== Boxing career ==
French Canadian Fontaine was a resident of Winnipeg, Manitoba, with his first recorded boxing match against Sammy Hudson, a fellow Canadian from Moose Jaw. Fontaine won the bout by knockout in the fifth. Fontaine was unbeaten in his next six matches, including a draw with Jack Reddick, who was at the time Canadian light heavyweight champion. On 14 August 1925, Fontaine faced Harry Dillon at Regina, Saskatchewan for the vacant Canadian middleweight title. The fight went the distance of ten rounds, and Dillon won the Championship on a points decision.

Despite his first professional defeat, Fontaine returned quickly to his original form, winning his next 4 fights. On 8 May 1926, Fontaine had his second attempt at the Canadian middleweight belt which had become vacant. Fought in Ottawa against Henry Henning, Fontaine won the match and the title in the second round with a technical knockout over his opponent. From this point, Fontaine attracted a better class of fighter, beginning with his first fight outside Canada, travelling to Philadelphia in a win over experienced American Bobby Marriott. His biggest fight to date came on 16 August 1926 when Welsh fighter Frank Moody travelled from the U.S. to Canada to face Fontaine. The contest went the distance, with Moody victorious. Fontaine finished the year with two bouts in the U.S., a win over Joe Anderson followed by a points loss to Rocky Smith.

The following year Fontaine travelled widely around the U.S. and Canada fighting with mixed results. His most notable fight that year was against Vincent Forgione, facing him twice in two months. After losing to Forgione by points in their first encounter, Fontaine was knocked out for the first time in his professional career when he faced Forgione for their second contest in July 1927. Fontaine continued fighting in North America over the next four years, and at the end of 1931 he faced Ted Moore, regaining the Canadian middleweight title.

In early 1931 Fontaine travelled from Canada to the United Kingdom by cattle boat to further his boxing career. Over the next three years Fontaine faced many of Britain's most successful middleweight boxers, including Billy Bird, Jack Casey, Gipsy Daniels, Tommy Farr, Jack Hyams and Harry Mason. From his arrival in the U.K., Fontaine's fight record was good with 23 wins, 4 losses and 3 draws, but from November 1933 his form took a terrible reversal with 4 wins, 16 losses and 2 draws. This string of poor results would later be used as Fontaine's defence during his murder trial, with his defence counsel stating he was "punch drunk" and therefore of diminished responsibility.

== Murder charge and execution ==
=== Murder of Hilda Meeks ===
Although Fontaine had a wife and children back in Canada, he had begun a two-year relationship with 21-year-old Hilda Meeks whilst living in Britain. Bristol-born Meeks was a one-time West End waitress, with dreams of becoming a dancer. Hilda was described by her friends as "flighty". On 10 July 1935, she was caught by Fontaine making a date with another man on the telephone. Fontaine, who was known to drink, confronted Meeks, taking the phone from her and challenged the man she was speaking to. Meeks' mother came into the room to protect her daughter and Fontaine pulled out a revolver. As Meeks ran into the street, Fontaine fatally shot her, he then fired a second shot into her mother. When Sam Meeks, Hilda's father, returned home he saw Fontaine carrying his daughter back into the house. Fontaine stated "I've done for her and done for the old woman", showing that he believed he had killed both women, though in fact the mother had survived.

At the trial Fontaine's defence contended that the boxer was suffering from acute depression and was probably "punch drunk". The defence called upon Ted Lewis, a former welterweight champion, who stated "Del shouldn't have been in the ring at all for his last fight. He wasn't in a fit state. ... As a boxer, he has received more punishment than anyone I have ever seen." Sam Meeks countered the claim believing that Fontaine had thrown his later fights. Fontaine was found guilty and sentenced to death by hanging by Mr Justice Porter.

=== Execution ===
By the time the execution date had been decided, protests had started pleading for a reprieve. A long petition was delivered, but to no avail. On the morning of 29 October 1935 a crowd gathered outside Wandsworth Prison, hymns were sung and politicians made anti-capital punishment speeches. That morning Fontaine was hanged by Robert Baxter in what was to be the latter’s penultimate execution.

Fontaine left a note "Hilda Meeks broke my heart I spent my last cent on her. She turned me against my own wife." A warden at the prison is quoted as saying "He was the bravest fellow we ever saw go to the scaffold."
