= Jamaica Kid =

American boxer

The Jamaica Kid (1896 – 12 June 1938) was a boxer born Robert Buckley (a.k.a. Robert Bulkley and James Buckley) in British Honduras who fought out of New Orleans and New York City as a professional from 1916 to 1928, primarily as a light-heavyweight. When he was based in Louisiana in the first year of his pro career, he won the World Colored Middleweight title from Eddie Palmer in New Orleans, a title he did not defend as he moved to New York City later that year.

The 5'8" (some sources put him at 5'9") Jamaica Kid campaigned as a light-heavyweight and heavyweight at between 172 and 181 lbs. He served as a sparring partner for many champion boxers, but during his own career in the ring, he was never ranked as a top contender, though he did get a shot at the world light-heavyweight crown in 1926.

After racking up 17 straight losses between 18 February 1924 and 29 November 1926 (a streak that was preceded with a draw against former colored light-heavyweight champ Lee Anderson on 21 January 1924 and included six losses to future world middleweight champ Tiger Flowers and two losses to future world light-heavyweight champ Maxie Rosenbloom, The Jamaica Kid got a shot at the NYSAC light-heavyweight title. He was paired against world light-heavyweight champ Jack Delaney, to whom he had already lost during his long losing streak, at the State Armory in Waterbury, Connecticut on 10 December 1926. The Kid lost via a T.K.O. in the third round of their scheduled 15-round bout.

In his career, The Jamaica Kid compiled an official career record of eight wins (winning via K.O. three times) against 34 losses (he was K.O.-ed 14 times) and three draws. He also had 43 newspaper decisions, winning 13, losing 24 and drawing six.

Awards and achievements
Preceded by Eddie Palmer	World Colored Middleweight Champ; May 19, 1916 – Vacated title	Succeeded by Panama Joe Gans
