= Lee Anderson (boxer) =

American boxer

Personal information
- Nationality: United States
- Born: July 17, 1889 Dearing, Georgia, U.S.
- Died: June 1970 (aged 80) New York City, New York, U.S.
- Height: 5 ft 10 in (1.78 m)
- Weight: Light heavyweight

Boxing career

Boxing record
- Total fights: 88
- Wins: 38
- Win by KO: 15
- Losses: 36
- Draws: 14

Lee Anderson (July 17, 1889 – June 1970) was a boxer who fought between 1914 and 1929. The 5'10" Anderson fought out of Oakland, California as a light heavyweight. He was the first holder of the World Colored Light Heavyweight title.

On May 30, 1921, he fought Kid Norfolk for the new colored light heavyweight title in a scheduled 10-round bout in Phoenix, Arizona. Anderson won on a T.K.O. when Norfolk returned to his corner in the ninth round, being unable to continue to fight. (They would meet another three times in non-title bouts between 1922 and 1924, and The Kid prevailed each time.)

Anderson defended the title on the Fourth of July 1921 in a 10-round bout in Phoenix, Arizona, beating Rough House Ware on points.

When Norfolk fought The Jamaica Kid on December 20, 1921 at Madison Square Garden in New York City, he had claimed the world colored light heavyweight title. He beat the Jamaica Kid on points in an eight-round bout. In Atlanta on January 30, 1922, Norfolk faced Tiger Flowers, the boxer who would become the first African American world middleweight champ in 1926, K.O.-ing him in third round of a 10-rounder. He apparently had vacated the title when he met reigning colored heavyweight champ Harry Wills on March 2, 1922 in Madison Square Garden in New York City for a 15-round bout, losing to the great champion via a K.O. in the second round. Wills outweighed him by 25¾ lbs.

On May 9 of that year, Lee Anderson took on Tiger Flowers in Ciudad Juárez, Mexico, for a 15-round bout to determine the colored light heavyweight title. Anderson won his second colored crown when he K.O.-ed Flowers in the seventh round.

Anderson apparently vacated the title in turn, and Kid Norfolk took the crown title for the second time one day short of a year later, on May 8, 1923, when he K.O.-ed Flowers at 2:50 in the first round of a scheduled 12-rounder. The title then went into abeyance.

Anderson retired from the ring. By 1942, he was living in a boardinghouse in Harlem and working as a stevedore on the Hudson River waterfront.

John Henry Lewis became the first black world light heavyweight champion in 1935.

In his career, Anderson racked up a record of 36 wins (15 by K.O., 32 losses (K.O.-ed four times) and 12 draws, plus eight newspaper decisions, in which he won two, lost two, and had two draws.

Awards and achievements
Preceded by New Title	World Colored Light Heavyweight Champion; May 30, 1921 – Unknown	Succeeded by Kid Norfolk; Won vacated title
Preceded by Kid Norfolk; Vacated title	World Colored Light Heavyweight Champion; May 9, 1922 – Unknown	Succeeded by Kid Norfolk; Won vacated title
