= Langford (surname) =

Langford is an English surname derived from one of the many places named Langford. Notable people with the surname include the following:

- Albert Langford (1899–1965), English footballer
- Bonnie Langford (born 1964), British actress and entertainer
- Cal Langford (1959–2025), Canadian bobsledder
- Chris Langford (born 1963), Australian rules footballer, father of Will
- Cooper Harold Langford (1895–1964), philosopher and logician
- Darren John Langford (born 1984), actor best known for playing Spencer Gray in Hollyoaks
- David Langford (born 1953), British SF author and publisher of the fanzine Ansible
- Frances Langford (1913–2005), American singer and actress
- Gordon Langford (1930–2017), English composer and arranger
- James Beverly Langford (1922–1996), American lawyer and politician
- Jeremy Langford (born 1991), American football player
- Jon Langford (born 1957), British rock musician and member of The Mekons, brother of David
- Josephine Langford (born 1997), Australian actress
- Katherine Langford (born 1996), Australian actress
- Keith Langford (born 1983), American basketball player
- Kendall Langford (born 1986), American football player
- Larry Langford (1946–2019), American politician from Alabama
- Laura Carter Holloway Langford (1843–1930), American journalist, author, and lecturer
- Lisa Kehler (née Langford; born 1967), English race walker
- Lorraine Langford (1923–1998), American politician
- Matthew Langford (born 1961), American bronze sculptor
- Muriel Langford (1913–2003), British/Australian missionary, linguist
- Nathaniel P. Langford (1832–1911), first superintendent of Yellowstone National Park
- Paul Langford (1945–2015), British academic
- Reshard Langford (born 1986), American football player
- Rick Langford (born 1952), American baseball pitcher
- Romeo Langford (born 1999), American basketball player
- Sam Langford (1886–1956), Canadian boxer
- Terry Langford (1966–1998), American convicted murderer
- Tommy Langford (born 1989), British boxer
- Will Langford (born 1992), Australian rules footballer, son of Chris
- Wyatt Langford (born 2001), American baseball player

== See also ==
- Baron Langford
- Langford baronets
- Lankford (surname)
- Viscount Langford
