= Lankford =

Lankford may refer to:

- Lankford (surname)
- Lankford coefficient
- Lankford Highway, United States
- Lankford House, Maryland, United States
- Lankford Smith (1914–1978), New Zealand footballer

== See also ==
- Langford (disambiguation)
