= Jacob Sampson =

Canadian actor

Jacob Sampson (born 1988) is a Canadian actor, playwright and theatre director from Nova Scotia. He is most noted for his play Chasing Champions, a dramatization of the life of boxer Sam Langford.

== Background ==
Born and raised in Coldbrook, Nova Scotia, he graduated from the theatre program at Acadia University in 2011. He subsequently appeared in stage performances in Halifax, notably including roles in George Elliott Clarke's Africville at Alderney Landing, and William Shakespeare's The Taming of the Shrew at Shakespeare by the Sea.

== Chasing Champions ==
Sampson's original concept had been to write a play about the more famous Canadian boxer George Dixon, but he shifted to writing about Langford, with whom he was previously not familiar, after repeatedly coming across Langford's name in his research. Chasing Champions premiered in 2016 at the Ship's Company Theatre in Parrsboro, Nova Scotia, and was remounted later in the year at Halifax's Eastern Front Theatre.

The production won six awards at the Robert Merritt Awards in 2017, including wins for Sampson in both Outstanding Actor and Outstanding Play by a Nova Scotian Playwright. The play subsequently underwent a wider tour in 2018, including a production at the National Arts Centre in Ottawa.

== Subsequent career ==
He won a second Robert Merritt Award for Outstanding Actor in 2020, for his performance in Shauntay Grant's The Bridge.

In 2021, his short theatrical monologue Umoja Corp was performed as part of Obsidian Theatre's 21 Black Futures web series, directed by Leighton Alexander Williams.

In 2022, he was named associate artistic director of Halifax's 2b Theatre Company.

He has also acted in film and television, including guest appearances in Haven, Seed, Sex & Violence, Trailer Park Boys, and Diggstown. In 2024, he had his first leading role in a film, as Sam in Kevin Hartford's comedy film To the Moon.
