= Langford =

Langford may refer to:

== Places ==
=== Australia ===
- Langford, Western Australia

=== Canada ===
- Langford, British Columbia, on Vancouver Island
- Rural Municipality of Langford, Manitoba
- Langford, Ontario

=== England ===
- Langford, Bedfordshire
- Langford, Essex
- Langford, Norfolk
- Langford, Nottinghamshire
- Langford, Oxfordshire
- Langford Budville, Somerset
- Lower Langford, Somerset
- Langford House, Durham

=== United States ===
- Langford, Maryland
- Langford, Mississippi
- Langford, New York
- Langford, South Dakota
- Mount Langford, a mountain in Yellowstone National Park

== Other uses ==
- Langford (surname)
- Viscount Langford
- Baron Langford
- Langford (Part One), 2007 EP by the Payolas
- Langford cultural tradition of the Oneota cultural complex
- Langford pairing
- Langford railway station (disambiguation)

== See also ==
- Lankford (disambiguation)
