= To the Moon (2024 film) =

- Directed by: Kevin Hartford
- Written by: Kevin Hartford
- Produced by: Thom Fitzgerald
- Starring: Jacob Sampson; Phoebe Rex; Amy Groening
- Cinematography: Tim Mombourquette
- Edited by: Amy Mielke
- Production company: Emotion Pictures
- Release date: September 16, 2024 (AIFF)
- Running time: 85 minutes
- Country: Canada
- Language: English

To the Moon is a Canadian comedy film, directed by Kevin Hartford and released in 2024. The film stars Jacob Sampson as Sam, a closeted gay single father who wrestles with finally coming out about his sexuality as he nears age 40.

The cast also includes Phoebe Rex as his daughter Ella, who is navigating the challenges of attending a new school and despite her youth is in some ways more mature than Sam, and Amy Groening as their neighbour Claire, an aspiring writer who is drawing on Sam and Ella's relationship for creative inspiration. The cast also includes David Light, Maria Young, Austin Marks, Lesley Smith, James MacLean, Katelyn McCulloch, Mauralea Austin, Calem MacDonald, Tyler Craig, Kathryn McCormack, Koumbie, Eugene Sampang, Samantha Wilson, Thom Payne and Zach Faye in supporting roles.

The film was already in development in 2021, when Hartford shot his debut film Lemon Squeezy. It went into production in 2023.

The film premiered at the 2024 Atlantic International Film Festival. It was the opening film for three festivals: the 2025 Reelout Queer Film Festival, the 2025 Tampa International Gay and Lesbian Film Festival Summer Fest, and the 2026 Out North Queer Film Festival.
