= Lankford (surname) =

Lankford is a surname. Notable people with the surname include:

- Benjamin Lankford (1727–1810), American patriot, planter, and politician
- James Lankford (born 1968), American politician
- John A. Lankford (1874–1946), American architect
- Kevin Lankford (born 1998), German-American soccer player
- Kim Lankford (born 1954), American businesswoman and actress
- Kirk Lankford (born 1985), American murderer
- Menalcus Lankford (1883–1937), American politician
- Michael Lankford, American politician
- Paul Lankford (born 1958), American football player
- Ray Lankford (born 1967), American baseball player
- Richard Estep Lankford (1914–2003), American politician
- Ryan Lankford (born 1991), Canadian football player
- William Lankford (disambiguation)

== See also ==
- Langford (surname)
