= Langford railway station =

Langford railway station may refer to:

- Langford railway station (Bedfordshire), a disused station in Bedfordshire, England, United Kingdom
- Langford railway station (British Columbia), a flag stop in Langford, British Columbia, Canada
- Langford railway station, Somerset, a disused station in Somerset, England, United Kingdom
- Langford railway station (Wiltshire), a disused station in Wiltshire, England, United Kingdom
- Langford and Ulting railway station, a disused station in Essex, England, United Kingdom
- Kelmscott and Langford railway station, a disused station in Gloucestershire, England, United Kingdom
