= Sam Langford =

Canadian boxer (1886–1956)

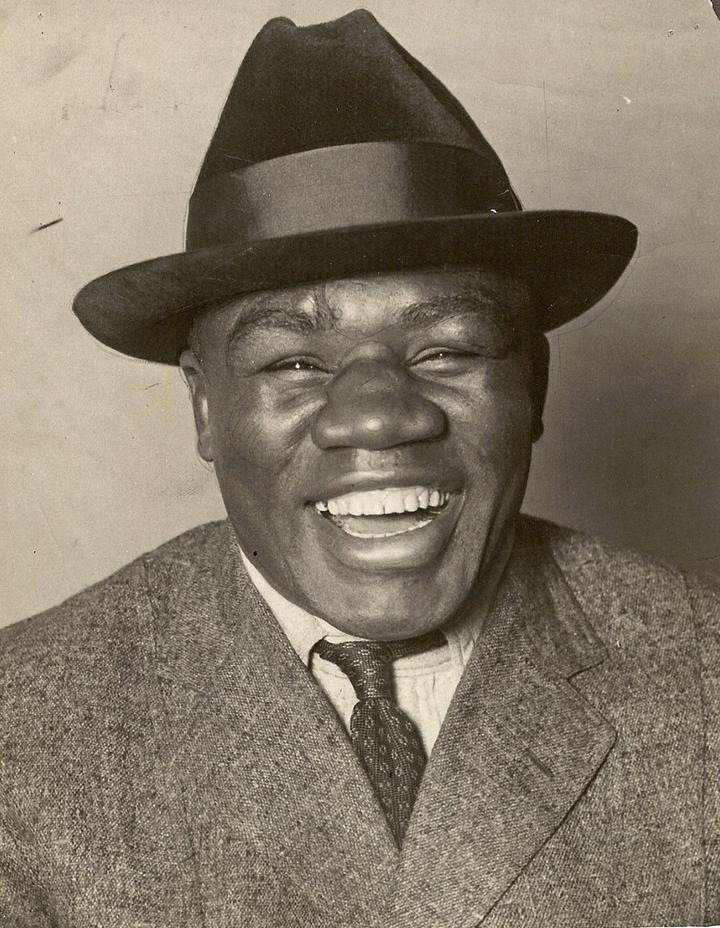
- Langford in 1922

Personal information
- Nicknames: Boston Tar Baby; Boston Terror; Boston Bonecrusher
- Born: Samuel Edgar Langford; March 4, 1886 Weymouth Falls, Nova Scotia, Canada
- Died: January 12, 1956 (aged 69) Cambridge, Massachusetts, US
- Height: 5 ft 6 1/2 in (1.69 m)
- Weight: Lightweight; Welterweight; Middleweight; Light heavyweight; Heavyweight

Boxing career
- Reach: 74 in (188 cm)
- Stance: Orthodox

Boxing record
- Total fights: 314, with the inclusion of newspaper decisions
- Wins: 210
- Win by KO: 126
- Losses: 43
- Draws: 53
- No contests: 8

Samuel Edgar Langford (March 4, 1886 – January 12, 1956) was a Canadian professional boxer who competed from 1902 to 1926. Called the "Greatest Fighter Almost Nobody Knows" by ESPN, Langford is considered by many boxing historians to be one of the greatest fighters of all time. Originally from Weymouth Falls, Nova Scotia, he moved to Boston, Massachusetts as a teenager, and began his professional boxing career there in 1902. Langford was known as "the Boston Bonecrusher", "the Boston Terror", and, most famously, "the Boston Tar Baby". Langford stood 5 ft 6 1/2 in (1.69 m) and weighed 185 lb (84 kg) in his prime. He fought from lightweight to heavyweight and defeated many world champions and legends of the time in each weight class. Considered a devastating puncher even at heavyweight, The Ring rated Langford second on their list of the "100 greatest punchers of all time". One boxing historian described Langford as "experienced as a heavyweight James Toney with the punching power of Mike Tyson".

He was denied a shot at many World Championships due to the colour bar and the refusal of Jack Johnson, the first African-American World Heavyweight Champion, to fight him in a rematch. Langford was the World Colored Heavyweight Champion, a title vacated by Johnson after he won the World Championship, a record five times. Alongside this, Langford also defeated the reigning Lightweight Champion Joe Gans, the first African-American World Champion in boxing history and widely regarded as one of the greatest boxers of all time, in a non-title bout. Langford is widely regarded by boxing historians and aficionados as the greatest boxer never to have won a world title. On August 12, 2020, the WBC granted Langford an honorary world title. BoxRec ranks him as the 2nd greatest Canadian boxer of all time, pound for pound.

== Early life ==
Sam Langford was born in Weymouth Falls, Nova Scotia, a rural black community that his grandfather, a former slave from the United States, helped settle. His birthdate was reported as March 4, 1886, although he later stated that this "is just a date he thought up." His brother, Reverend Charles Langford, was reportedly the first person to each Sam to box. However, their father was abusive, and so Langford left home as a youth.

He first worked as a fisherman in Grand Manan, from whence traveled, by boat and on foot, to Boston, Massachusetts, where he eventually found work as a janitor in the boxing gymnasium of the Lenox Athletic Club. He was scouted by the owner of the club after sparring with the boxers training there. He won the amateur featherweight championship of Boston at age 15.

== Professional career ==
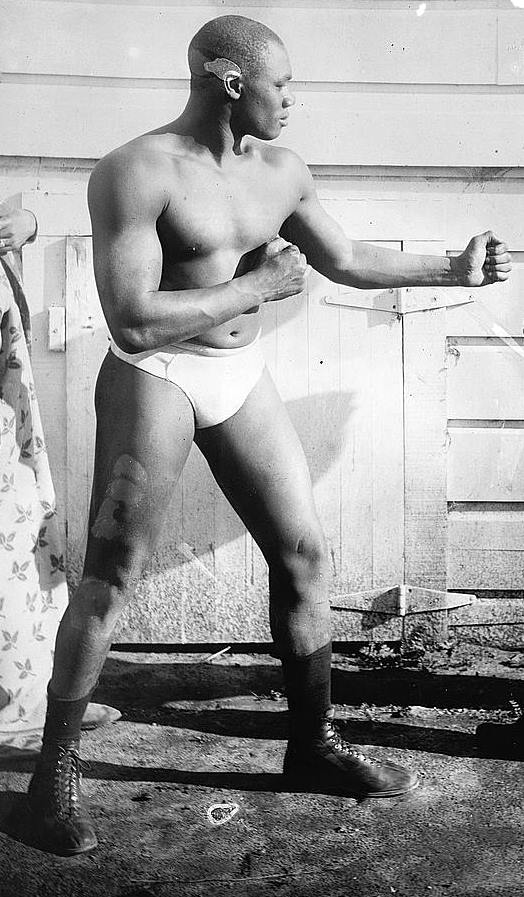
Langford in 1910

Langford boxed in multiple weight classes, including the lightweight, welterweight, middleweight, and heavyweight divisions. However, Langford never received a chance to fight for Jack Johnson's heavyweight title, and he was never able to secure a world title for himself.

=== Early career ===
Sam Langford debuted as a lightweight boxer on April 11, 1902, when he was 16. He fought Jack McVicker, whom he had also fought as an amateur. He won this match by knockout. Soon after, he began taking matches on a rapid and regular basis. By December of 1903, Buffalo News remarked that Langford had taken an average of one fight a week for several months on end, describing him as "indefatigable".

Langford fought 15 rounds against reigning lightweight champion Joe Gans on December 8, 1903 in Boston. The National Police Gazette noted that Gans had the advantage going into the sixth round, but Langford took the lead thereafter. Buffalo News concurred, stating that Langford "appeared to be somewhat afraid" of Gans for the first three rounds, but by the last eight he was dominating the champion. Langford won the fight by decision, a victory that few predicted beforehand. However, Langford did not receive the lightweight champion title as he was two pounds over the weight limit.

Langford's most memorable fights were his numerous encounters against fellow Black boxers Sam McVey, Battling Jim Johnson, Joe Jeanette and Harry Wills, who all experienced similar barriers in their fighting careers.

He fought Jack Blackburn, trainer of the legendary Joe Louis, six times. The first three fights were draws, the fourth a decision win for Langford, the fifth another draw and the sixth a no contest.

=== World Welterweight title fight ===
Although Langford is often credited as the greatest fighter to never challenge for a world title, he fought World Welterweight Champion Barbados Joe Walcott, a black man, on September 5, 1904, at Lake Massabesic Coliseum in Manchester, New Hampshire for his title. Both fighters weighed in at 142 lbs. The fight lasted fifteen rounds and resulted in a draw via decision; thus, Walcott retained his title. The Boston Globe claimed that Langford won a clear victory, as he "brought the champion to one knee" in the third round while he himself "went through the entire fifteen rounds without a perceptible scratch". They argued the draw decision largely resulted from Walcott's role as the primary aggressor in the fight.

=== World Colored Middleweight Championship ===
Sam Langford traveled to England in early 1907. It was rumored that Langford was set to fight Gunner Moir, the English heavyweight champion, despite not being in the same weight class. Instead, Langford defeated Tiger Smith by fourth-round knockout to claim the middleweight championship of England in May of 1907. Langford returned to the United States in September of the same year, having, in the words of the Buffalo Evening News, "whipped every man he met in his class."

Langford fought welterweight Young Peter Jackson for the World Colored Middleweight Championship on November 12, 1907. The match took place at the Pacific Athletic Club in Los Angeles over 20 rounds. Betting odds were 10-to-6 in favor of Jackson, but Langford won the decision at the end of the twentieth round.

Langford fought World Middleweight Champion Stanley Ketchel on April 27, 1910 in a six-round non-title fight. The fight was a no-decision draw, with rumors suggesting a re-match was planned. Ketchel was murdered six months later, and no rematch took place.

=== World Colored Heavyweight Championship ===
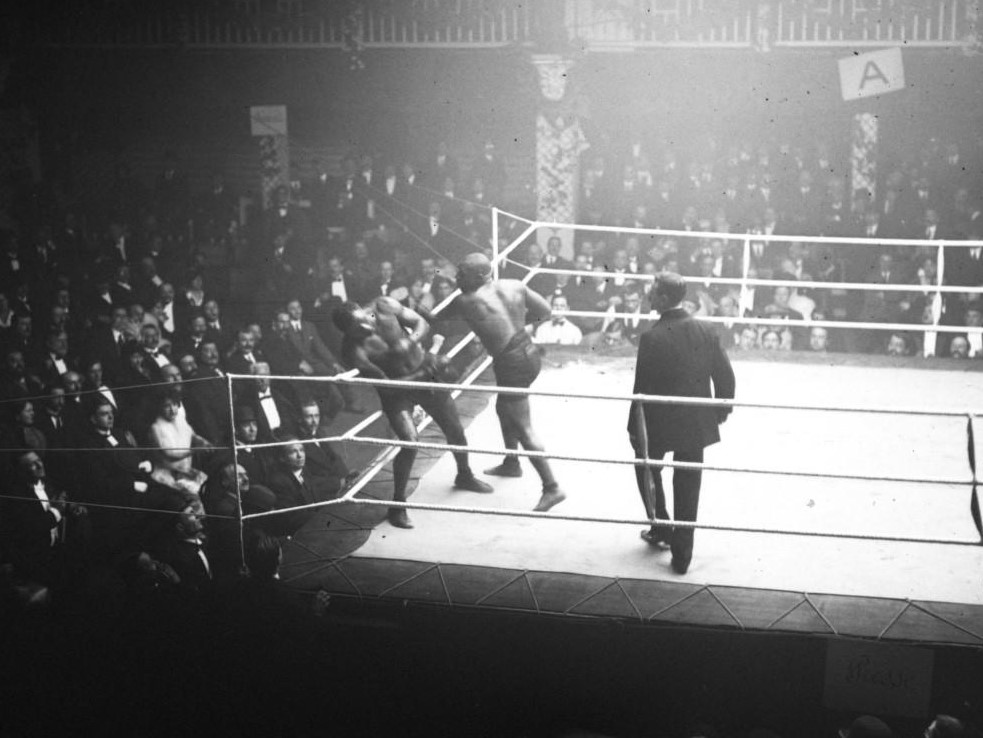
Langford vs. Joe Jeanette, boxing match, at Luna Park, in Paris, France, in 1913

Sam Langford won the World Colored Heavyweight Championship a record five times between 1910 and 1918. Jack Johnson had reigned as the World Colored Heavyweight Champion from 1903 to 1908, when he relinquished the title after winning the World Heavyweight Championship. Joe Jeanette and Sam McVey fought in Paris in February 1909 to fill the vacant title, with McVey the victor. Jeanette took the title away from McVey two months later.

Subsequently, Langford claimed the title during Jeanette's reign after Johnson refused to defend the World Heavyweight Championship against him. For a year there were two duelling claimants to the world-coloured heavyweight crown, Jeanette, the "official" champ, and Langford, the pretender, the man whom Jack Johnson "ducked". On September 6, 1910, in Boston, Massachusetts, Langford became the undisputed coloured champ by winning a 15-round bout with Jeanette on points. Still, Jack Johnson refused to give him a title shot.

Langford fought Sam McVey at Cirque de Paris on April 1, 1911. They fought for 20 rounds in total, after which the fight was called a draw. The Times noted that the crowd disapproved of the verdict, largely siding with Langford.

In 1912, Langford was one of the contenders for the World Colored Heavyweight Championship fought at various venues across Australia. Sam McVey his opponent, McVey ranked alongside Jack Johnson, Joe Jeanette, Sam Langford, and Harry Wills as the top black heavyweights of their generation. Prior to his win, Langford stayed at the Nedlands Park Hotel where he:

gave exhibitions of punching the ball, throwing the medicine bag sparring, etc. His work was a revelation. Langford allowed his sparring partners to hit him just when and where they pleased. After witnessing his exhibition of wonderful foot and head work one could easily understand how the big-little fellow came to lay low the best boxers in the world. Langford is as fast on his feet and as graceful as a ballet dancer. He carries a punch like unto that of a kick of a mule, and is practically impervious to punishment. Dick Cullen hit him some terrific punches on the chin last Wednesday – punches that would have put the ordinary boxer away for the full count, but the Tar Baby only grinned and shoved out his head for more. He is truly a remarkable fighter.

=== Failure to secure World Heavyweight Championship title shot ===
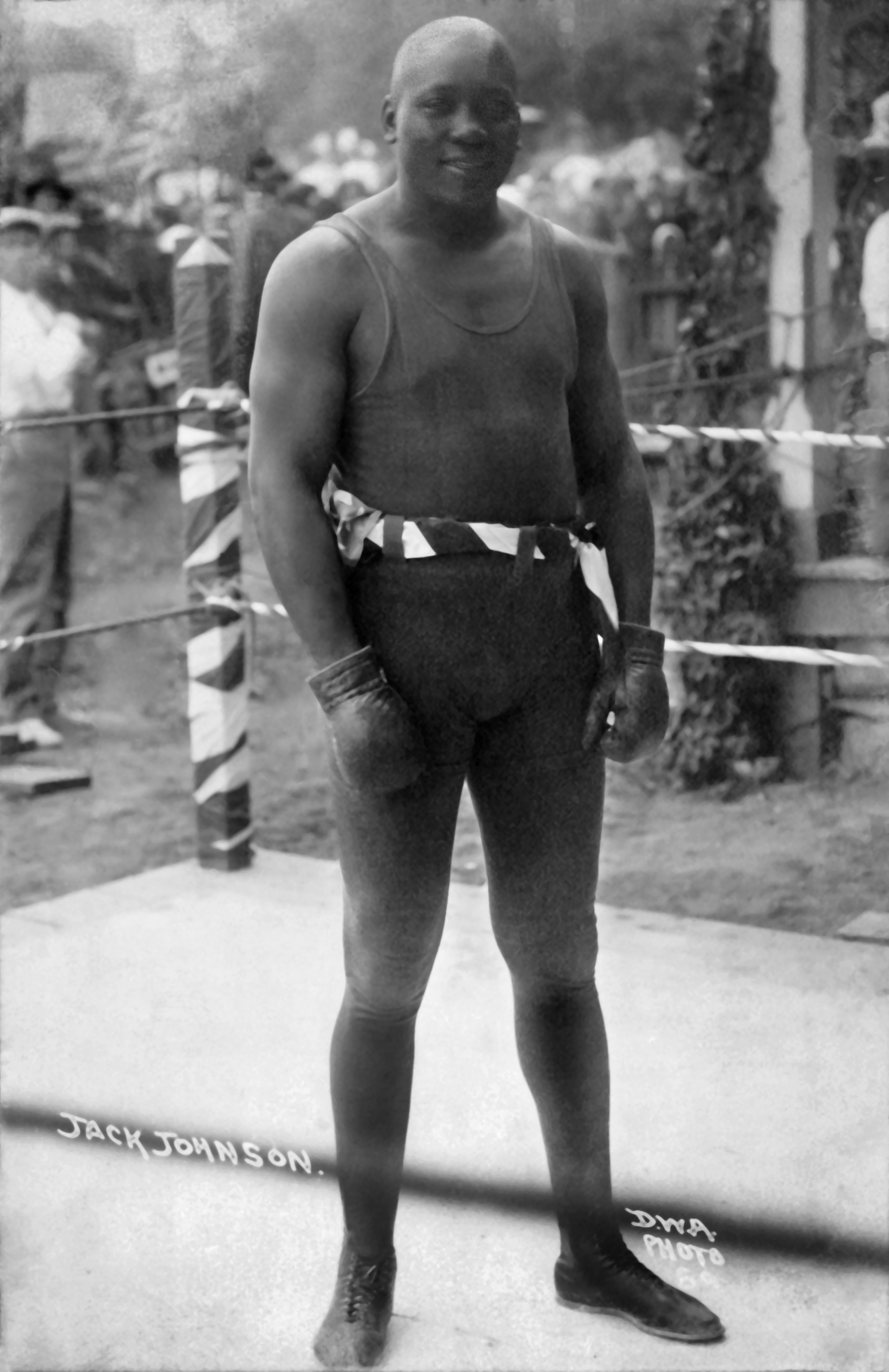
Jack Johnson, the first African American, world heavyweight champion, defeated Langford but refused to offer him a rematch, circa 1910–1915.

Ironically, the colour bar that had marred the world heavyweight title by blackballing boxers of colour remained in force even under Jack Johnson. Once he was the World's Heavyweight Champion, Johnson did not fight a black opponent for the first five years of his reign. In addition to Langford, he denied matches to black heavyweights Joe Jeanette and to the young Harry Wills (who was Colored Heavyweight Champion during the last year of Johnson's reign as World Heavyweight Champion).

Langford fought Jack Johnson only once, on April 26, 1906, before Johnson became the first black World Heavyweight Champion. Langford weighed 146 pounds at the time compared to Jack Johnson's 196. Their match took place in Chelsea, Massachusetts, and lasted the full 15 rounds. Langford knocked Johnson down for nine counts in the first round, but Johnson took control of the fight from there and knocked Langford down twice in the sixth round. Langford was bloodied by the thirteenth round, but started to come back by the last two rounds. According to John Footsley, some spectators came away with the opinion that Langford would have won had the match gone to twenty rounds instead of fifteen. Instead, Johnson won the decision. Langford later said that the match proved "a good big man can lick a good little man". Johnson, meanwhile, said of Langford, "I don’t want to fight that little smoke. He's got a chance to win against anyone in the world. I'm the first black [heavyweight] champion and I'm going to be the last."

After winning their first match, Johnson repeatedly refused rematches against Langford, who was considered by some to be the most dangerous challenger for Johnson's crown. Another explanation for this Johnson's refusal is that he knew that a fight between two black fighters would not generate nearly as much revenue as a fight between him and a white man. Battling Jim Johnson, the man Sam fought twelve times, beating Johnson nine times and never losing once, would be the one who got the title shot against Johnson.

The National Sporting Club of London attempted to arrange a re-match between Langford and Johnson as early as 1909, while Langford was still attempting to schedule a title bout with middleweight champion Stanley Ketchel. The National Sporting Club offered to pay for Johnson to travel to Australia to fight Tommy Burns in exchange. Both fighters initially agreed to the fight, and it was scheduled for May 21, with $4,000 (equivalent to $143,333 in 2025) going to the victor and $2,000 (equivalent to $71,667 in 2025) to the loser. However, after defeating Burns in March, Johnson changed his mind, citing the purse: "Now that I am at the top, I intend to go out hard after the coin." Johnson also claimed that Langford would have no chance to win a fight, citing their previous bout.

Langford still left for London on April 29, 1909. Instead of fighting Jack Johnson for the world heavyweight championship, Langford fought Ian Hague for the English heavyweight championship for a purse of $9,000 (equivalent to $322,500 in 2025). Both boxers hoped to challenge Jack Johnson, who set off for England on May 25, if they won. Langford weighed in at 168 pounds, 12 pounds under Hague's 180; his height and reach were also the lesser of the two's. Regardless, Langford won the match by knocking Hague out with a right to the chin in the fourth of a scheduled twenty rounds. The Buffalo Evening News noted that Langford's speed and tactical knowledge helped him carry the match despite the size difference. When Langford returned to the United States in June of 1909, he once again challenged Johnson: "I am ready to fight Johnson for the championship at any time. In fact I would have met him in England but he would not cross the ocean, fearing he would meet defeat."

In August 1913, as Johnson neared the end of his troubled reign as World Heavyweight Champion, there were rumours that he had agreed to fight Langford in Paris for the title, but it came to naught. Johnson claimed that Langford was unable to raise $30,000 (equivalent to approximately $964,286 in today's funds) for his guarantee.

When Johnson finally did agree to take on a black opponent in late 1913, it was not Sam Langford, the current Colored Heavyweight Champion, that he gave the title shot to. Instead, Johnson chose Battling Jim Johnson. Battling Jim's next fight, four months later, also was a title match. On March 27, 1914, in New York City, Sam Langford won a newspaper decision in a ten-rounder with Johnson. According to the New York Times, the coloured champ "won by a wide margin" because Johnson "failed to show anything remotely resembling championship ability."

In 1915, Jack Johnson lost his title to Jess Willard, the last in a long line of Great White Hopes. Because of the animosity he had generated combined with the virulent racism of the period, it would be 22 years before another African American, Joe Louis, was given a shot at the Heavyweight title.

=== Later career ===
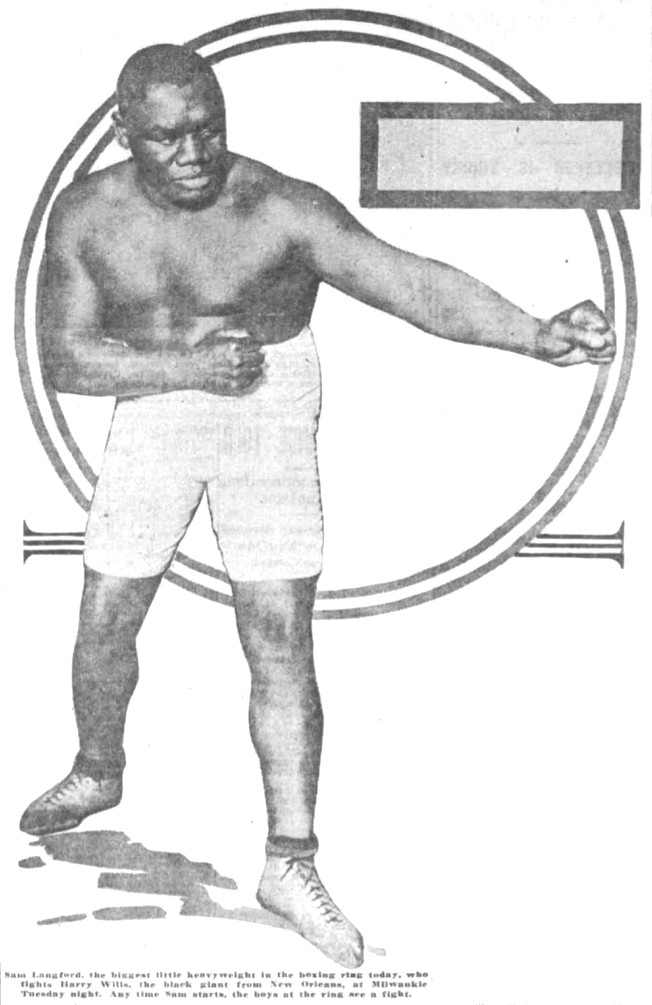
Langford in 1922

Langford defeated former World Light Heavyweight Champion Philadelphia Jack O'Brien on August 15, 1911, by fifth-round technical knockout. Langford outweighed O'Brien by ten pounds. The fight was stopped after a hard left hook put O'Brien on the canvas. O'Brien had to be helped to his corner. The poetic O'Brien later said of Langford, "When he appeared upon the scene of combat, you knew you were cooked."

Langford fought heavyweight Harry Wills seventeen times. Langford was 31 in the first bout and continued to suffer from old age and failing eyesight more and more each fight. The first was a draw via points, the second a win via fourteenth-round knockout, the third and fourth losses via decision, the fifth a win via nineteenth-round knockout, the sixth through ninth losses via decision, the tenth a draw via points, the eleventh a loss via sixth-round knockout and the twelfth by seventh-round technical knockout, the thirteenth through seventeenth by decision (total: 2 wins (2 KO), 14 losses (2 KO) and 2 draws).

Former World Heavyweight Champion Tommy Burns was a referee in the third fight. At the end, he caught Langford's hand and said to him, "Sam, this is the hardest I ever had to do in my life. I always admired you and never thought to see you beaten, but I have to give the decision against you."

Langford fought heavyweight Fred Fulton twice, losing the first by seventh-round technical knockout and the second by a four-round decision. Langford was 34 and 35 in each respective fight. Langford was much heavier, yet much shorter than Fulton.

On June 5, 1922, Langford knocked out Tiger Flowers in only the second round. Langford was mostly blind and Flowers would soon afterwards win the World Middleweight Championship.

In 1923, Sam Langford fought and won Boxing's last "fight to the finish" for the Mexican Heavyweight title.

Films exist of Langford fighting Fireman Jim Flynn and Bill Lang.

One story characterizing his career involved Langford in a bout where he had been ordered not to throw any knockout punches until after the seventh round. So walking out for the eighth round, after 21 minutes of patting away, Langford touched gloves with his opponent. "What's the matter, Sam, it ain't the last round!" said his mystified opponent. "Tis for you son," said Langford, who promptly knocked his opponent out. Another story involves Langford at a fight where just before it began he apologized to the audience and said he would have to make it a quick fight as he had a train to catch very soon. He then knocked out his opponent within the first round, apologized to the audience once again, and left, just in time to catch his train.

His last fight was in 1926, when his failing eyesight finally forced him to retire. Langford was 43 years old and almost completely blind.

== Life after boxing ==
When Al Laney sought out Sam Langford to write an article in 1944, Langford was forgotten or considered dead by many. He lived "in a dingy hall bedroom" in Harlem, New York City on money given by a foundation for the blind. He had only twenty cents (equivalent to $4 in 2025) to his name. Laney reported that Langford was amiable and intelligent, an engaging storyteller, and did not want pity. Langford was quoted as saying, "I had plenty good times. I been all over the world. I fought maybe three, four hundred fights and every one was a pleasure." Following the publication of the article "A Dark Man Laughs" in the New York Herald Tribune, Laney conducted a campaign that raised almost $10,000 USD (equivalent to $182,892 in 2025) to be put into a trust fund for Sam Langford, as well as a variety of gifts including a guitar.

Langford was enshrined in The Ring magazine Hall of Fame and Canada's Sports Hall of Fame in 1955. He died a year later, on January 12, 1956, while living with his daughter in Cambridge, Massachusetts.

== Legacy ==
Sam Langford is a significant figure in Nova Scotian sports history. Langford was one of the inaugural inductees of the Nova Scotia Sport Hall of Fame when it was founded in 1964. Langford was also voted Nova Scotia's top male athlete of the 20th century in 1999. Langford was later ranked fifth in a selection of the greatest 15 athletes in Nova Scotia's history. BoxRec ranks Langford pound for pound as the second greatest Canadian boxer of all time, just behind Jimmy McLarnin.

Langford has also been ranked among the greatest boxers of his era. ESPN labeled Langford "the greatest fighter almost nobody knows," citing sportswriter Bert Sugar who ranked Langford 16th, the best-ranking non-champion, among the top 100 boxers in history. Nat Fleischer ranked Langford seventh among the top heavyweight boxers of all time in the Ring Record Book and Boxing Encyclopedia. In their 2003 yearbook, The Ring ranked Langford second among the "100 greatest punchers of all time", just behind Joe Louis. In the 1973 book In This Corner... former world heavyweight champion Jack Dempsey said, "I think Sam Langford was the greatest fighter we ever had." He recalled refusing a fight with Langford as a young boxer in 1916 because Dempsey feared getting his "brains knocked out" due to a lack of experience.

The musical trio Tarbaby released an avant-garde jazz album entitled Ballad of Sam Langford through Hipnotic Records in 2013. In 2016, Jacob Sampson premiered the play Chasing Champions, a dramatization of Langford's life which Sampson both wrote and starred in as Langford. The play won six Robert Merritt Awards, including Outstanding New Play by a Nova Scotian. A thirteen-minute short film entitled Bonecrusher was produced in 2020 based on the Sam Langford v. Jim Flynn fight of 1923. The director Jim Morrison expressed his desire to eventually make a feature-length film about Sam Langford's life as well, and stated that a script was already prepared.

== Professional boxing record ==
All information in this section is derived from BoxRec, unless otherwise stated.

=== Official record ===
314 fights	178 wins	30 losses
By knockout	126	8
By decision	49	21
By disqualification	3	1
Draws	38	
No contests	8	
Newspaper decisions/draws	60	

All newspaper decisions are officially regarded as “no decision” bouts and are not counted in the win/loss/draw column.

No.	Result	Record	Opponent	Type	Round, time	Date	Age	Location	Notes
314	Loss	178–30–38 (68)	Brad Simmons	TKO	1 (10)	Aug 2, 1926	40 years, 151 days	Drumright, Oklahoma, US	Langford retired completely blind
313	Win	178–29–38 (68)	Young Jack Johnson	KO	2 (?)	Jul 1, 1926	40 years, 119 days	Shawnee, Oklahoma, US	
312	Loss	177–29–38 (68)	Battling Gahee	PTS	8	Sep 25, 1925	N/A	Location unknown	Exact date unknown
311	Win	177–28–38 (68)	Frolin Gonzales	PTS	10	Apr 5, 1925	39 years, 32 days	Mexico	Reported but not confirmed
310	Draw	176–28–38 (68)	Tim Sullivan	PTS	6	Mar 1, 1925	N/A	Location unknown	Exact date unknown
309	Draw	176–28–37 (68)	Tim Sullivan	PTS	6	Jan 1, 1925	N/A	Location unknown	Exact date unknown
308	Win	176–28–36 (68)	Smiling Kid Nolan	KO	2 (?)	Sep 10, 1924	38 years, 190 days	Mexico City, Distrito Federal, Mexico	Reported but not confirmed
307	Win	175–28–36 (68)	Sydney Grant	KO	4 (?)	Jul 7, 1924	38 years, 125 days	Mexico City, Distrito Federal, Mexico	Reported but not confirmed
306	Win	174–28–36 (68)	Eddie Tremblay	KO	3 (4)	May 4, 1924	38 years, 61 days	Venice, California, US	Reported but not confirmed
305	Loss	173–28–36 (68)	Eddie Tremblay	PTS	4	Apr 23, 1924	38 years, 50 days	Venice, California, US	
304	Win	173–27–36 (68)	Sammy Olson	PTS	4	Apr 18, 1924	38 years, 45 days	Bakersfield Stadium, Bakersfield, California, US	
303	ND	172–27–36 (68)	Jim Jam Barry	ND	4	Apr 16, 1924	38 years, 43 days	San Fernando Stadium, San Fernando, California, US	Bout went four rounds. San Fernando Sun did not give result of decision though.
302	Win	172–27–36 (67)	Jim Jam Barry	PTS	4	Apr 4, 1924	38 years, 31 days	Huntington Beach, California, US	
301	Win	171–27–36 (67)	Smiling Kid Nolan	KO	5 (?)	Mar 6, 1924	38 years, 2 days	Venice, California, US	Reported but not confirmed
300	Win	170–27–36 (67)	Tom Riley	KO	2 (?)	Jan 20, 1924	37 years, 322 days	Ciudad Juarez, Chihuahua, Mexico	
299	Win	169–27–36 (67)	Fireman Jim Flynn	PTS	8	Jan 6, 1924	37 years, 308 days	Ford's Arena, Ciudad Juarez, Chihuahua, Mexico	
298	Loss	168–27–36 (67)	Sonny Goodrich	PTS	10	Dec 18, 1923	37 years, 289 days	Community House, San Antonio, Texas, US	For Mexico heavyweight title
297	Win	168–26–36 (67)	Roscoe Hall	KO	1 (?)	Dec 11, 1923	37 years, 282 days	Mexico City, Distrito Federal, Mexico	Reported but not confirmed
296	Win	167–26–36 (67)	Andrés Balsa	TKO	8 (15)	Nov 10, 1923	37 years, 251 days	Teatro Independencia, Monterrey, Nuevo León, Mexico	
295	Win	166–26–36 (67)	Fireman Jim Flynn	KO	3 (15)	Oct 19, 1923	37 years, 229 days	Mexico City, Distrito Federal, Mexico	
294	Loss	165–26–36 (67)	Bearcat Wright	KO	9 (?)	Aug 15, 1923	37 years, 164 days	Mexico City, Distrito Federal, Mexico	
293	Win	165–25–36 (67)	Fireman Jim Flynn	PTS	10	Aug 2, 1923	37 years, 151 days	Mexico City, Distrito Federal, Mexico	
292	Loss	164–25–36 (67)	Clem Johnson	TKO	13 (15), 1:25	Jul 27, 1923	37 years, 145 days	Plaza de Toros, Ciudad Juarez, Chihuahua, Mexico	Lost Mexico heavyweight title
291	Win	164–24–36 (67)	Jim Tracey	KO	4 (20)	Jul 15, 1923	37 years, 133 days	Mexico City, Distrito Federal, Mexico	Retained Mexico heavyweight title
290	Win	163–24–36 (67)	Jack Voight	KO	5 (15)	May 19, 1923	37 years, 76 days	El Toreo de Cuatro Caminos, Mexico City, Distrito Federal, Mexico	Retained Mexico heavyweight title
289	Win	162–24–36 (67)	Art Surans	KO	3 (?)	May 16, 1923	37 years, 73 days	Mexico City, Distrito Federal, Mexico	Retained Mexico heavyweight title
288	Win	161–24–36 (67)	Andrés Balsa	KO	3	May 6, 1923	37 years, 63 days	Mexico City, Distrito Federal, Mexico	Scheduled as a "finish fight"
287	Win	160–24–36 (67)	Andrés Balsa	PTS	10	Apr 28, 1923	37 years, 55 days	Arena Cine Imperio, Torreon, Coahuila de Zaragoza, Mexico	
286	Win	159–24–36 (67)	Chihuahua Kid Brown	PTS	15	Apr 15, 1923	37 years, 42 days	Plaza de Toros, Torreon, Coahuila de Zaragoza, Mexico	
285	Win	158–24–36 (67)	Andrés Balsa	TKO	6 (15)	Apr 8, 1923	37 years, 35 days	Mexico City, Distrito Federal, Mexico	Retained Mexico heavyweight title
284	Win	157–24–36 (67)	Jack Savage	KO	1 (?)	Mar 31, 1923	37 years, 27 days	Chapultepec Bull Ring, Mexico City, Distrito Federal, Mexico	Won Mexico heavyweight title
283	Win	156–24–36 (67)	Chihuahua Kid Brown	KO	1 (10)	Mar 17, 1923	37 years, 13 days	Mexico City, Distrito Federal, Mexico	
282	Win	155–24–36 (67)	Jim Tracey	KO	6 (?)	Mar 2, 1923	36 years, 363 days	Mexico City, Distrito Federal, Mexico	
281	Win	154–24–36 (67)	Tom McCarty	KO	2 (?)	Feb 15, 1923	36 years, 348 days	Albuquerque, New Mexico, US	
280	Win	153–24–36 (67)	Sonny Goodrich	TKO	7 (12)	Dec 25, 1922	36 years, 296 days	Market House Arena, San Antonio, Texas, US	
279	Win	152–24–36 (67)	Roscoe Hall	KO	3 (?)	Dec 24, 1922	36 years, 295 days	Mexico	Reported but not confirmed
278	Win	151–24–36 (67)	Jack Taylor	KO	8 (?)	Dec 12, 1922	36 years, 283 days	Mexico	
277	Draw	150–24–36 (67)	Jim Jam Barry	PTS	10	Nov 10, 1922	36 years, 251 days	Douglas, Arizona, US	
276	Draw	150–24–35 (67)	Jack Taylor	PTS	15	Nov 5, 1922	36 years, 246 days	Ciudad Juarez, Chihuahua, Mexico	
275	Win	150–24–34 (67)	Jack Taylor	PTS	15	Oct 20, 1922	36 years, 230 days	Ciudad Juarez, Chihuahua, Mexico	
274	Win	149–24–34 (67)	Cyclone Smith	KO	2 (?)	Oct 6, 1922	36 years, 216 days	El Paso, Texas, US	
273	Win	148–24–34 (67)	Battling Owens	KO	7 (15)	Sep 22, 1922	36 years, 202 days	Ciudad Juarez, Chihuahua, Mexico	
272	Draw	147–24–34 (67)	Jack Taylor	NWS	10	Aug 21, 1922	36 years, 170 days	Mizzou Park, Sioux City, Iowa, US	
271	Draw	147–24–34 (66)	Brad Simmons	NWS	10	Aug 11, 1922	36 years, 160 days	Wichita, Kansas, US	
270	Win	147–24–34 (65)	Bill Tate	PTS	12	Aug 4, 1922	36 years, 153 days	Tulsa, Oklahoma, US	
269	Win	146–24–34 (65)	Bearcat Wright	RTD	5 (12)	Jul 17, 1922	36 years, 135 days	Tulsa, Oklahoma, US	
268	Draw	145–24–34 (65)	Bearcat Wright	PTS	12	Jun 19, 1922	36 years, 107 days	City Auditorium, Galveston, Texas, US	
267	Win	145–24–33 (65)	Tiger Flowers	KO	2 (10)	Jun 5, 1922	36 years, 93 days	Ponce de Leon Ballpark, Atlanta, Georgia, US	
266	Draw	144–24–33 (65)	Ted Jamieson	PTS	10	May 22, 1922	36 years, 79 days	Private club, Chicago, Illinois, US	
265	Win	144–24–32 (65)	Roscoe Hall	KO	4 (8)	May 16, 1922	36 years, 73 days	Bijou Ring, Nashville, Tennessee, US	
264	Win	143–24–32 (65)	Roscoe Hall	KO	2 (8)	Apr 20, 1922	36 years, 47 days	Venice A.C., Memphis, Tennessee, US	
263	Win	142–24–32 (65)	Jack Leslie	NWS	10	Apr 15, 1922	36 years, 42 days	Indianapolis, Indiana, US	
262	Loss	142–24–32 (64)	Tut Jackson	DQ	5 (12)	Apr 6, 1922	36 years, 33 days	Triangle Park, Dayton, Ohio, US	
261	Loss	142–23–32 (64)	Bill Tate	PTS	8	Mar 27, 1922	36 years, 23 days	Memphis, Tennessee, US	
260	Win	142–22–32 (64)	Cyclone Smith	KO	2 (10)	Mar 17, 1922	36 years, 13 days	Clyffeside Park, Ashland, Kentucky, US	
259	Loss	141–22–32 (64)	Harry Wills	PTS	10	Jan 17, 1922	35 years, 319 days	Arena, Milwaukie, Oregon, US	For world colored heavyweight title claim
258	Win	141–21–32 (64)	Young Peter Jackson	NWS	10	Dec 9, 1921	35 years, 280 days	Illinois Theatre, Urbana, Illinois, US	
257	Win	141–21–32 (63)	Lee Anderson	PTS	10	Dec 7, 1921	35 years, 278 days	Tucson, Arizona, US	
256	Loss	140–21–32 (63)	Lee Anderson	PTS	10	Nov 24, 1921	35 years, 265 days	Capital City Arena, Phoenix, Arizona, US	
255	Win	140–20–32 (63)	Young Peter Jackson	KO	2 (10)	Oct 18, 1921	35 years, 228 days	The Armouries, Toronto, Ontario, Canada	Not to be confused with Young Peter Jackson
254	Loss	139–20–32 (63)	Bill Tate	NWS	12	Sep 21, 1921	35 years, 201 days	Riverside Arena, Covington, Kentucky, US	
253	Loss	139–20–32 (62)	Lee Anderson	NWS	12	Sep 5, 1921	35 years, 185 days	Coliseum, Fort Worth, Texas, US	
252	Draw	139–20–32 (61)	Topeka Jack Johnson	PTS	6	Aug 19, 1921	35 years, 168 days	State Fairgrounds, Topeka, Kansas, US	
251	Win	139–20–31 (61)	George Godfrey	KO	1 (12)	Aug 17, 1921	35 years, 166 days	Riverside Arena, Covington, Kentucky, US	
250	Win	138–20–31 (61)	Lee Anderson	PTS	10	Aug 12, 1921	35 years, 161 days	Omaha, Nebraska, US	
249	Win	137–20–31 (61)	Bearcat Wright	KO	9 (10)	Jul 20, 1921	35 years, 138 days	Omaha, Nebraska, US	
248	Win	136–20–31 (61)	Bill Watkins	KO	?	Feb 7, 1921	N/A	Canada	Exact date, location and # of rounds unknown
247	Win	135–20–31 (61)	Alfred Johnson	KO	?	Feb 6, 1921	N/A	Canada	Exact date, location and # of rounds unknown
246	Draw	134–20–31 (61)	Jack Thompson	PTS	10	Feb 3, 1921	N/A	Canada	Exact date unknown
245	Win	134–20–30 (61)	Bob Devere	TKO	7 (10)	Jan 14, 1921	34 years, 316 days	Armory, Portland, Oregon, US	
244	Draw	133–20–30 (61)	Lee Anderson	PTS	12	Jan 7, 1921	34 years, 309 days	Omaha, Nebraska, US	
243	Win	133–20–29 (61)	Jim Jam Barry	PTS	10	Dec 29, 1920	34 years, 300 days	Armory, Portland, Oregon, US	
242	Win	132–20–29 (61)	Clem Johnson	PTS	10	Dec 23, 1920	34 years, 294 days	Aberdeen, Washington, US	
241	Win	131–20–29 (61)	Terry Kellar	PTS	6	Dec 9, 1920	34 years, 280 days	Aberdeen, Washington, US	
240	Win	130–20–29 (61)	Tiny Jim Herman	TKO	7 (10)	Dec 2, 1920	34 years, 273 days	Heilig Theater, Portland, Oregon, US	
239	Win	129–20–29 (61)	George Godfrey	KO	2 (10)	Nov 17, 1920	34 years, 258 days	Hot Springs, Arkansas, US	
238	Win	128–20–29 (61)	Jack Thompson	PTS	8	Nov 15, 1920	34 years, 256 days	Southern A.C., Memphis, Tennessee, US	
237	Loss	127–20–29 (61)	Lee Anderson	PTS	10	Oct 20, 1920	34 years, 230 days	Heilig Theater, Portland, Oregon, US	
236	Win	127–19–29 (61)	Frank Farmer	PTS	4	Oct 13, 1920	34 years, 223 days	Arena, Seattle, Washington, US	
235	Win	126–19–29 (61)	Tiny Jim Herman	KO	7 (10)	Oct 6, 1920	34 years, 216 days	Heilig Theater, Portland, Oregon, US	
234	Loss	125–19–29 (61)	Bill Tate	NWS	6	Sep 6, 1920	34 years, 186 days	Floyd Fitzsimmons Arena, Benton Harbor, Michigan, US	
233	Win	125–19–29 (60)	Bearcat Wright	PTS	10	Aug 30, 1920	34 years, 179 days	Walthill, Nebraska, US	
232	Win	124–19–29 (60)	Sam McVea	NWS	10	Aug 14, 1920	34 years, 163 days	East Chicago, Indiana, US	
231	Win	124–19–29 (59)	Pinky Lewis	KO	7 (8), 1:30	Jul 26, 1920	34 years, 144 days	Southern A.C., Memphis, Tennessee, US	
230	Win	123–19–29 (59)	Jack Mitchell	KO	3 (10)	Jul 2, 1920	34 years, 120 days	Springfield, Missouri, US	
229	Win	122–19–29 (59)	Rough House Ware	KO	9 (15)	Jun 7, 1920	34 years, 95 days	Tulane Arena, New Orleans, Louisiana, US	
228	Win	121–19–29 (59)	Jeff Clark	PTS	15	May 31, 1920	34 years, 88 days	Columbus, Ohio, US	
227	Win	120–19–29 (59)	Marty Cutler	TKO	3 (10)	May 18, 1920	34 years, 75 days	Armouries, Windsor, Ontario, Canada	
226	Draw	119–19–29 (59)	George Godfrey	PTS	10	May 1, 1920	N/A	Canada	Exact date unknown
225	Loss	119–19–28 (59)	Harry Wills	PTS	15	Apr 23, 1920	34 years, 50 days	Detroit, Michigan, US	For world colored heavyweight title
224	Win	119–18–28 (59)	Silas Green	KO	3 (10)	Apr 9, 1920	34 years, 36 days	Detroit, Michigan, US	
223	Win	118–18–28 (59)	Jack Thompson	PTS	15	Apr 5, 1920	34 years, 32 days	Convention Hall, Muskogee, Oklahoma, US	
222	Win	117–18–28 (59)	Jamaica Kid	TKO	7 (12)	Mar 29, 1920	34 years, 25 days	Columbus, Ohio, US	
221	Win	116–18–28 (59)	Battling Gahee	KO	2 (8)	Feb 23, 1920	33 years, 356 days	Southern A.C., Memphis, Tennessee, US	
220	Draw	115–18–28 (59)	Jeff Clark	NWS	10	Feb 16, 1920	33 years, 349 days	K of C Hall, Terre Haute, Indiana, US	
219	Win	115–18–28 (58)	Jeff Clark	NWS	10	Jan 16, 1920	33 years, 318 days	Kalamazoo, Michigan, US	
218	Win	115–18–28 (57)	Dave McBride	KO	1 (?), 1:00	Dec 3, 1919	33 years, 274 days	Liberty Theater, Camp Grant, Illinois, US	
217	NC	114–18–28 (57)	Jack Thompson	NC	6 (10)	Nov 24, 1919	33 years, 265 days	Shrine Auditorium, Duluth, Minnesota, US	Both fighters were fined $500 for stalling
216	Win	114–18–28 (56)	Mexican Jim Johnson	KO	9 (15)	Nov 17, 1919	33 years, 258 days	Auditorium, Sioux City, Iowa, US	
215	Loss	113–18–28 (56)	Harry Wills	PTS	15	Nov 5, 1919	33 years, 246 days	Convention Hall, Tulsa, Oklahoma, US	For world colored heavyweight title
214	Draw	113–17–28 (56)	Jack Thompson	PTS	15	Oct 21, 1919	33 years, 231 days	Tulsa, Oklahoma, US	Bout was advertised for the colored heavyweight championship
213	Loss	113–17–27 (56)	Harry Wills	NWS	10	Sep 30, 1919	33 years, 210 days	Arena, Syracuse, New York, US	
212	Win	113–17–27 (55)	Rough House Wilson	KO	4 (10)	Sep 18, 1919	33 years, 198 days	Battle Creek, Michigan, US	
211	Win	112–17–27 (55)	Bill Tate	NWS	10	Aug 23, 1919	33 years, 172 days	Grand Rapids, Michigan, US	
210	Draw	112–17–27 (54)	Jack Thompson	PTS	15	Aug 4, 1919	33 years, 153 days	Tulsa, Oklahoma, US	
209	Loss	112–17–26 (54)	Harry Wills	NWS	8	Jul 4, 1919	33 years, 122 days	Sportsman's Park, Saint Louis, Missouri, US	World colored heavyweight title at stake (via KO only)
208	Win	112–17–26 (53)	Bill Tate	DQ	5 (10)	Jun 19, 1919	33 years, 107 days	Nicollet Park, Minneapolis, Minnesota, US	Tate was disqualified for holding
207	Win	111–17–26 (53)	Billy Hooper	KO	4 (10)	Apr 30, 1919	33 years, 57 days	Springer Opera House, Columbus, Georgia, US	
206	Loss	110–17–26 (53)	Willie Meehan	PTS	4	Mar 4, 1919	33 years, 0 days	Coliseum, San Francisco, California, US	
205	Loss	110–16–26 (53)	Fred Fulton	PTS	4	Dec 27, 1918	32 years, 298 days	Civic Auditorium, San Francisco, California, US	
204	Win	110–15–26 (53)	Jeff Clark	PTS	8	Dec 16, 1918	32 years, 287 days	Nashville, Tennessee, US	
203	Win	109–15–26 (53)	Big Boy Butler	KO	5 (10)	Dec 12, 1918	32 years, 283 days	Empire Theatre, Rock Island, Illinois, US	
202	Loss	108–15–26 (53)	Jeff Clark	NWS	6	Nov 28, 1918	32 years, 269 days	Olympia A.C., Philadelphia, Pennsylvania, US	
201	Draw	108–15–26 (52)	Jeff Clark	PTS	10	Nov 15, 1918	32 years, 256 days	Atlanta, Georgia, US	
200	Draw	108–15–25 (52)	Jeff Clark	PTS	12	Oct 31, 1918	32 years, 241 days	Crescent Rink, Lowell, Massachusetts, US	
199	Win	108–15–24 (52)	Battling Jim Johnson	NWS	8	Aug 22, 1918	32 years, 171 days	Lafayette A.C., Saint Louis, Missouri, US	
198	Win	108–15–24 (51)	Rough House Ware	KO	9 (15)	Aug 19, 1918	32 years, 168 days	Tulsa, Oklahoma, US	
197	Win	107–15–24 (51)	Jack Thompson	NWS	6	Aug 8, 1918	32 years, 157 days	Shibe Park, Philadelphia, Pennsylvania, US	
196	Win	107–15–24 (50)	Battling Jim Johnson	NWS	8	Aug 5, 1918	32 years, 154 days	Atlantic City S.C., Atlantic City, New Jersey, US	
195	Win	107–15–24 (49)	Battling Jim Johnson	PTS	10	Jun 19, 1918	32 years, 107 days	Auditorium, Atlanta, Georgia, US	
194	Loss	106–15–24 (49)	Harry Wills	TKO	8 (20)	May 19, 1918	32 years, 76 days	Plaza de Toros Vista Alegre, Panama City, Panama	For world colored heavyweight title
193	Loss	106–14–24 (49)	Harry Wills	KO	6 (20)	Apr 14, 1918	32 years, 41 days	Plaza de Toros Vista Alegre, Panama City, Panama	Lost world colored heavyweight title
192	Win	106–13–24 (49)	Kid Norfolk	KO	2 (20)	Dec 17, 1917	31 years, 288 days	Stockyards Stadium, Denver, Colorado, US	Retained world colored heavyweight title
191	Draw	105–13–24 (49)	Harry Wills	NWS	12	Nov 12, 1917	31 years, 253 days	Coliseum, Toledo, Ohio, US	World colored heavyweight title at stake (via KO only)
190	Loss	105–13–24 (48)	Harry Wills	NWS	10	Sep 20, 1917	31 years, 200 days	Clermont Avenue Rink, New York City, New York, US	World colored heavyweight title at stake (via KO only)
189	Win	105–13–24 (47)	Andy Johnson	KO	2 (15)	Sep 17, 1917	31 years, 197 days	Maryland A.C., Ardmore, Maryland, US	
188	Win	104–13–24 (47)	Joe Jennette	NWS	12	Sep 14, 1917	31 years, 194 days	Coliseum, Toledo, Ohio, US	World colored heavyweight title at stake (via KO only)
187	Win	104–13–24 (46)	Andre Anderson	TKO	2 (?)	Aug 17, 1917	31 years, 166 days	Urban Liberty Park, Buffalo, New York, US	
186	Loss	103–13–24 (46)	Fred Fulton	TKO	7 (12)	Jun 19, 1917	31 years, 100 days	Armory A.A., Boston, Massachusetts, US	
185	Loss	103–12–24 (46)	Harry Wills	NWS	6	May 11, 1917	31 years, 68 days	Cambria A.C., Philadelphia, Pennsylvania, US	
184	Win	103–12–24 (45)	Bill Tate	KO	5 (12)	May 1, 1917	31 years, 58 days	Future City A.C., Saint Louis, Missouri, US	Won world colored heavyweight title
183	Win	102–12–24 (45)	Bob Devere	NWS	10	Apr 20, 1917	31 years, 47 days	Harlem S.C., New York City, New York, US	
182	Win	102–12–24 (44)	Jack Thompson	NWS	10	Apr 10, 1917	31 years, 37 days	Broadway S.C., New York City, New York, US	
181	Loss	102–12–24 (43)	Bill Tate	PTS	12	Jan 25, 1917	30 years, 327 days	Grand Opera House, Kansas City, Missouri, US	Lost world colored heavyweight title
180	Win	102–11–24 (43)	Battling Jim Johnson	PTS	12	Jan 1, 1917	30 years, 303 days	Academy A.C., Kansas City, Missouri, US	Retained world colored heavyweight title
179	Win	101–11–24 (43)	Bob Devere	NWS	10	Dec 29, 1916	30 years, 300 days	Montreal, Quebec, Canada	
178	Win	101–11–24 (42)	Battling Jim Johnson	KO	12 (12), 2:30	Dec 12, 1916	30 years, 283 days	Future City A.C., Saint Louis, Missouri, US	Retained world colored heavyweight title
177	Draw	100–11–24 (42)	Bill Tate	NWS	10	Nov 30, 1916	30 years, 271 days	Arena, Syracuse, New York, US	
176	Draw	100–11–24 (41)	Sam McVea	PTS	20	Aug 12, 1916	30 years, 161 days	Teatro Roma, Avellaneda, Buenos Aires, Argentina	Retained world colored heavyweight title
175	Win	100–11–23 (41)	Joe Jennette	KO	7 (10)	May 12, 1916	30 years, 69 days	Arena, Syracuse, New York, US	Retained world colored heavyweight title claim; Won undisputed world colored heavyweight title
174	Draw	99–11–23 (41)	Sam McVea	NWS	12	May 2, 1916	30 years, 59 days	East Market St. Rink, Akron, Ohio, US	World colored heavyweight title claim at stake (via KO only)
173	Loss	99–11–23 (40)	Harry Wills	NWS	8	Apr 25, 1916	30 years, 52 days	Coliseum, Saint Louis, Missouri, US	World colored heavyweight title claim at stake (via KO only)
172	Win	99–11–23 (39)	Sam McVea	NWS	10	Apr 7, 1916	30 years, 34 days	Arena, Syracuse, New York, US	World colored heavyweight title claim at stake (via KO only)
171	Win	99–11–23 (38)	Jeff Clark	TKO	5 (10)	Mar 31, 1916	30 years, 27 days	Future City A.C., Saint Louis, Missouri, US	Retained world colored heavyweight title claim
170	Win	98–11–23 (38)	Dave Mills	TKO	2 (10)	Mar 23, 1916	30 years, 19 days	Arena, Syracuse, New York, US	Retained world colored heavyweight title claim
169	Loss	97–11–23 (38)	Harry Wills	NWS	10	Mar 7, 1916	30 years, 3 days	Broadway Arena, New York City, New York, US	World colored heavyweight title claim at stake (via KO only)
168	Win	97–11–23 (37)	Cleve Hawkins	NWS	10	Feb 28, 1916	29 years, 361 days	Long Acre A.C., New York City, New York, US	World colored heavyweight title claim at stake (via KO only)
167	Win	97–11–23 (36)	Sam McVea	NWS	10	Feb 17, 1916	29 years, 350 days	Madison Square Garden, New York City, New York, US	
166	Win	97–11–23 (35)	Harry Wills	KO	19 (20)	Feb 11, 1916	29 years, 344 days	Tommy Burns Arena, New Orleans, Louisiana, US	Won world colored heavyweight title claim
165	Loss	96–11–23 (35)	Harry Wills	PTS	20	Jan 3, 1916	29 years, 305 days	Tulane A.C., New Orleans, Louisiana, US	For world colored heavyweight title claim
164	Loss	96–10–23 (35)	Harry Wills	NWS	10	Dec 3, 1915	29 years, 274 days	Harlem S.C., New York City, New York, US	World colored heavyweight title at stake (via KO only)
163	Draw	96–10–23 (34)	Sam McVea	NWS	10	Nov 23, 1915	29 years, 264 days	American A.C., New York City, New York, US	
162	Win	96–10–23 (33)	Battling Jim Johnson	PTS	15	Oct 18, 1915	29 years, 228 days	National A.C., Denver, Colorado, US	
161	Draw	95–10–23 (33)	Sam McVea	PTS	20	Sep 30, 1915	29 years, 210 days	Stockyards Stadium, Denver, Colorado, US	
160	Win	95–10–22 (33)	Jack Thompson	TKO	1 (15), 0:32	Jul 16, 1915	29 years, 134 days	National A.C., Denver, Colorado, US	
159	Loss	94–10–22 (33)	Sam McVea	PTS	12	Jun 29, 1915	29 years, 117 days	Atlas A.A., Boston, Massachusetts, US	For a claim of the world colored heavyweight title
158	Win	94–9–22 (33)	Battling Jim Johnson	NWS	10	Jun 8, 1915	29 years, 96 days	Broadway S.C., New York City, New York, US	
157	NC	94–9–22 (32)	Porky Dan Flynn	NC	8 (10)	Apr 19, 1915	29 years, 46 days	Montreal Sporting Club, Montreal, Quebec, Canada	Neither man appeared willing to really mix it, as they boxed with open gloves despite repeated warnings from referee Rooney.
156	Loss	94–9–22 (31)	Joe Jennette	PTS	12	Apr 13, 1915	29 years, 40 days	Atlas A.A., Boston, Massachusetts, US	Lost world colored heavyweight title
155	Win	94–8–22 (31)	Battling Jim Johnson	NWS	10	Apr 6, 1915	29 years, 33 days	135th Street A.C., New York City, New York, US	World colored heavyweight title at stake (via KO only)
154	Win	94–8–22 (30)	Harry Wills	KO	14 (20)	Nov 26, 1914	28 years, 267 days	Arena, Vernon, California, US	Retained world colored heavyweight title
153	Win	93–8–22 (30)	Jim Cameron	TKO	6 (8)	Nov 16, 1914	28 years, 257 days	Arctic Street Arena, San Diego, California, US	Retained world colored heavyweight title
152	Win	92–8–22 (30)	Tom McMahon	TKO	6 (20)	Nov 10, 1914	28 years, 251 days	Arena, Vernon, California, US	
151	Loss	91–8–22 (30)	Jeff Clark	NWS	10	Oct 26, 1914	28 years, 236 days	Joplin, Missouri, US	World colored heavyweight title at stake (via KO only)
150	Win	91–8–22 (29)	Gunboat Smith	KO	3 (12)	Oct 20, 1914	28 years, 230 days	Atlas A.A., Boston, Massachusetts, US	
149	Win	90–8–22 (29)	Colin Bell	TKO	4 (12)	Oct 6, 1914	28 years, 216 days	Atlas A.A., Boston, Massachusetts, US	
148	Draw	89–8–22 (29)	Joe Jennette	NWS	10	Oct 1, 1914	28 years, 211 days	Stadium A.C., New York City, New York, US	World colored heavyweight title at stake (via KO only)
147	Draw	89–8–22 (28)	Battling Jim Johnson	PTS	12	Sep 15, 1914	28 years, 195 days	Atlas A.A., Boston, Massachusetts, US	Retained world colored heavyweight title
146	Win	89–8–21 (28)	George 'Kid' Cotton	KO	4 (12)	Aug 25, 1914	28 years, 174 days	Atlas A.A., Boston, Massachusetts, US	Retained world colored heavyweight title
145	Win	88–8–21 (28)	Battling Jim Johnson	NWS	10	Aug 12, 1914	28 years, 161 days	Stadium A.C., New York City, New York, US	World colored heavyweight title claim at stake (via KO only)
144	Win	88–8–21 (27)	Bill Watkins	KO	4 (10)	May 25, 1914	28 years, 82 days	Olympic A.C., Rochester, New York, US	Retained world colored heavyweight title
143	Draw	87–8–21 (27)	Harry Wills	NWS	10	May 1, 1914	28 years, 58 days	National Baseball Park, New Orleans, Louisiana, US	World colored heavyweight title claim at stake (via KO only)
142	Win	87–8–21 (26)	Rough House Ware	TKO	5 (8)	Apr 20, 1914	28 years, 47 days	Memphis, Tennessee, US	
141	Win	86–8–21 (26)	George 'Kid' Cotton	PTS	8	Apr 15, 1914	28 years, 42 days	Chattanooga, Tennessee, US	Retained world colored heavyweight title
140	Win	85–8–21 (26)	Battling Jim Johnson	NWS	10	Mar 27, 1914	28 years, 23 days	Empire A.C., New York City, New York, US	World colored heavyweight title at stake (via KO only)
139	Win	85–8–21 (25)	Bill Watkins	TKO	1 (10)	Mar 23, 1914	28 years, 19 days	National S.C., New York City, New York, US	Retained world colored heavyweight title
138	Win	84–8–21 (25)	Matthew Curran	KO	1 (20), 0:30	Jan 24, 1914	27 years, 326 days	Luna Park Arena, Paris, France	
137	Win	83–8–21 (25)	Joe Jennette	PTS	20	Dec 20, 1913	27 years, 291 days	Luna Park Arena, Paris, France	Won vacant FBF world heavyweight title
136	Loss	82–8–21 (25)	Gunboat Smith	PTS	12	Nov 17, 1913	27 years, 258 days	Atlas A.A., Boston, Massachusetts, US	
135	Win	82–7–21 (25)	Jack Lester	RTD	5 (10)	Oct 27, 1913	27 years, 237 days	Taft, California, US	
134	Loss	81–7–21 (25)	Joe Jennette	NWS	10	Oct 3, 1913	27 years, 213 days	Madison Square Garden, New York City, New York, US	World colored heavyweight title at stake (via KO only)
133	Win	81–7–21 (24)	John Lester Johnson	KO	1 (10)	Sep 9, 1913	27 years, 189 days	Atlantic Garden A.C., New York City, New York, US	Retained world colored heavyweight title
132	Win	80–7–21 (24)	Porky Dan Flynn	KO	4 (12)	Aug 26, 1913	27 years, 175 days	Atlas A.A., Boston, Massachusetts, US	
131	Draw	79–7–21 (24)	Colin Bell	PTS	15	Jun 19, 1913	27 years, 107 days	Gymnasium Ground, Rockhampton, Queensland, Australia	
130	Draw	79–7–20 (24)	Sam McVea	PTS	20	Mar 24, 1913	27 years, 20 days	Olympic Stadium, Brisbane, Queensland, Australia	Retained world colored heavyweight title
129	Win	79–7–19 (24)	Jim Barry	KO	1 (20)	Mar 15, 1913	27 years, 11 days	Sydney Stadium, Sydney, New South Wales, Australia	
128	Win	78–7–19 (24)	Sam McVea	KO	13 (20)	Dec 26, 1912	26 years, 297 days	Sydney Stadium, Sydney, New South Wales, Australia	Retained Australian and world colored heavyweight titles
127	Win	77–7–19 (24)	Sam McVea	TKO	11 (20)	Oct 9, 1912	26 years, 219 days	Exhibition Stadium, Perth, Western Australia, Australia	Retained Australian and world colored heavyweight titles; McVea claimed he was fouled. The ref disagreed and McVea refused to continue.
126	Win	76–7–19 (24)	Sam McVea	PTS	20	Aug 3, 1912	26 years, 152 days	Sydney Stadium, Sydney, New South Wales, Australia	Retained Australian and world colored heavyweight titles
125	Win	75–7–19 (24)	Porky Dan Flynn	TKO	14 (20)	May 27, 1912	26 years, 84 days	Athletic Pavilion, Melbourne, Victoria, Australia	
124	Win	74–7–19 (24)	Jim Barry	TKO	11 (20)	May 13, 1912	26 years, 70 days	Athletic Pavilion, Melbourne, Victoria, Australia	
123	Win	73–7–19 (24)	Sam McVea	PTS	20	Apr 8, 1912	26 years, 35 days	Sydney Stadium, Sydney, New South Wales, Australia	Won Australian and world colored heavyweight titles
122	Win	72–7–19 (24)	Jim Barry	PTS	20	Feb 12, 1912	25 years, 345 days	Sydney Stadium, Sydney, New South Wales, Australia	
121	Loss	71–7–19 (24)	Sam McVea	PTS	20	Dec 26, 1911	25 years, 297 days	Sydney Stadium, Sydney, New South Wales, Australia	Lost world colored heavyweight title
120	Win	71–6–19 (24)	Tony Caponi	TKO	3 (10)	Nov 6, 1911	25 years, 247 days	Twentieth Century A.C., New York City, New York, US	
119	Win	70–6–19 (24)	Joe Jennette	NWS	10	Sep 5, 1911	25 years, 185 days	Madison Square Garden, New York City, New York, US	World colored heavyweight title at stake (via KO only)
118	Win	70–6–19 (23)	Tony Ross	KO	6 (10)	Aug 24, 1911	25 years, 173 days	National Sporting Club, New York City, New York, US	
117	Win	69–6–19 (23)	Philadelphia Jack O'Brien	TKO	5 (10), 2:00	Aug 15, 1911	25 years, 164 days	Twentieth Century A.C., New York City, New York, US	
116	Win	68–6–19 (23)	Jim Smith	TKO	5 (10)	Aug 9, 1911	25 years, 158 days	Atlantic Garden A.C., New York City, New York, US	
115	ND	67–6–19 (23)	Jack Driscoll	ND	10	Jul 29, 1911	25 years, 147 days	Winnipeg, Manitoba, Canada	
114	Win	67–6–19 (22)	Jack Fitzgerald	TKO	5 (10)	Jun 29, 1911	25 years, 117 days	National S.C., New York City, New York, US	
113	Win	66–6–19 (22)	Tony Caponi	NWS	10	Jun 16, 1911	25 years, 104 days	Auditorium Rink, Winnipeg, Manitoba, Canada	
112	Win	66–6–19 (21)	Ralph Calloway	TKO	4 (10)	May 30, 1911	25 years, 87 days	Alhambra, Syracuse, New York, US	
111	Draw	65–6–19 (21)	Sam McVea	PTS	20	Apr 1, 1911	25 years, 28 days	Cirque de Paris, Paris, France	Retained world colored heavyweight title
110	Win	65–6–18 (21)	Bill Lang	DQ	6 (20)	Feb 21, 1911	24 years, 354 days	Olympia Annexe, Kensington, London, England	
109	Win	64–6–18 (21)	Fred Atwater	TKO	3 (?)	Jan 16, 1911	24 years, 318 days	State Armory, Utica, New York, US	
108	Win	63–6–18 (21)	Joe Jennette	PTS	12	Jan 10, 1911	24 years, 312 days	Armory A.A., Boston, Massachusetts, US	Retained world colored heavyweight title
107	Win	62–6–18 (21)	Morris Harris	KO	2 (12)	Dec 6, 1910	24 years, 277 days	Armory, Boston, Massachusetts, US	Retained world colored heavyweight title
106	Win	61–6–18 (21)	Jeff Clark	TKO	2 (10)	Nov 10, 1910	24 years, 251 days	Business Men's A.C., Joplin, Missouri, US	Retained world colored heavyweight title
105	Win	60–6–18 (21)	Joe Jennette	PTS	15	Sep 6, 1910	24 years, 186 days	Armory A.A., Boston, Massachusetts, US	Retained world colored heavyweight title claim Won world colored heavyweight title
104	Win	59–6–18 (21)	Al Kubiak	TKO	2 (10)	May 17, 1910	24 years, 74 days	Fairmont A.C., New York City, New York, US	
103	Win	58–6–18 (21)	Battling Jim Johnson	NWS	6	May 14, 1910	24 years, 71 days	National A.C., Philadelphia, Pennsylvania, US	World colored heavyweight title claim at stake (via KO only)
102	Win	58–6–18 (20)	Stanley Ketchel	NWS	6	Apr 27, 1910	24 years, 54 days	National A.C., Philadelphia, Pennsylvania, US	
101	Win	58–6–18 (19)	Jim Barry	KO	16 (25)	Apr 14, 1910	24 years, 41 days	Arena, Vernon, California, US	
100	Win	57–6–18 (19)	Fireman Jim Flynn	KO	8 (45)	Mar 17, 1910	24 years, 13 days	Jeffries' Arena, Vernon, California, US	Footage of this fight exists
99	Win	56–6–18 (19)	Nat Dewey	TKO	1 (20), 1:50	Feb 22, 1910	23 years, 355 days	Turner Hall, Cheyenne, Wyoming, US	
98	Loss	55–6–18 (19)	Fireman Jim Flynn	NWS	10	Feb 8, 1910	23 years, 341 days	Naud Junction Pavilion, Los Angeles, California, US	
97	Win	55–6–18 (18)	Dixie Kid	KO	3 (8)	Jan 10, 1910	23 years, 312 days	Phoenix A.C., Memphis, Tennessee, US	Retained world colored heavyweight title claim
96	Win	54–6–18 (18)	Mike Schreck	TKO	1 (6)	Nov 23, 1909	23 years, 264 days	Old City Hall, Pittsburgh, Pennsylvania, US	
95	Win	53–6–18 (18)	Klondike Haynes	KO	2 (12), 1:35	Nov 2, 1909	23 years, 243 days	Armory, Boston, Massachusetts, US	Retained world colored heavyweight title claim
94	Win	52–6–18 (18)	Dixie Kid	RTD	5 (12)	Sep 28, 1909	23 years, 208 days	Armory, Boston, Massachusetts, US	Retained world colored heavyweight title claim
93	Win	51–6–18 (18)	Klondike Haynes	NWS	6	Jul 13, 1909	23 years, 131 days	Bijou Theater, Pittsburgh, Pennsylvania, US	Claimed vacant world colored heavyweight title
92	Win	51–6–18 (17)	William Hague	KO	4 (20), 1:59	May 24, 1909	23 years, 81 days	National Sporting Club, Covent Garden, London, England	Won inaugural NSC version of the world heavyweight title
91	Draw	50–6–18 (17)	Sandy Ferguson	PTS	12	Apr 27, 1909	23 years, 54 days	Armory A.A., Boston, Massachusetts, US	
90	Win	50–6–17 (17)	Al Kubiak	NWS	6	Apr 17, 1909	23 years, 44 days	National A.C., Philadelphia, Pennsylvania, US	
89	Draw	50–6–17 (16)	Jim Barry	NWS	10	Apr 14, 1909	23 years, 41 days	Chadwick Park, Albany, US	
88	Win	50–6–17 (15)	John Willie	KO	2 (6)	Apr 3, 1909	23 years, 30 days	National A.C., Philadelphia, Pennsylvania, US	
87	Win	49–6–17 (15)	Morris Harris	TKO	7 (10)	Mar 29, 1909	23 years, 25 days	Marathon A.C., New York City, New York, US	
86	Win	48–6–17 (15)	Jim Barry	NWS	6	Mar 17, 1909	23 years, 13 days	Washington S.C., Philadelphia, Pennsylvania, US	
85	Win	48–6–17 (14)	Fireman Jim Flynn	KO	1 (20), 2:14	Dec 21, 1908	22 years, 292 days	Coliseum, San Francisco, California, US	
84	Win	47–6–17 (14)	Joe Jennette	NWS	6	Sep 1, 1908	22 years, 181 days	National A.C., New York City, New York, US	
83	Win	47–6–17 (13)	Tony Ross	TKO	5 (6)	Aug 7, 1908	22 years, 156 days	Fairmont A.C., New York City, New York, US	
82	Win	46–6–17 (13)	John Willie	KO	2 (10)	Jul 21, 1908	22 years, 139 days	Navarre A.C., New York City, New York, US	
81	Win	45–6–17 (13)	Jim Barry	KO	3 (6)	Jun 19, 1908	22 years, 107 days	Fairmont A.C., New York City, New York, US	
80	Win	44–6–17 (13)	Sandy Ferguson	PTS	12	May 19, 1908	22 years, 76 days	Roanoke A.C., Boston, Massachusetts, US	
79	Win	43–6–17 (13)	Jim Barry	KO	2 (12)	Apr 7, 1908	22 years, 34 days	Roanoke A.C., Boston, Massachusetts, US	
78	Win	42–6–17 (13)	Larry Temple	PTS	8	Mar 11, 1908	22 years, 7 days	Roanoke A.C., Boston, Massachusetts, US	
77	Draw	41–6–17 (13)	Joe Jennette	PTS	12	Mar 3, 1908	21 years, 365 days	Armory, Boston, Massachusetts, US	
76	Win	41–6–16 (13)	Black Fitzsimmons	TKO	4 (6)	Feb 10, 1908	21 years, 343 days	Roanoke A.C., Boston, Massachusetts, US	
75	Draw	40–6–16 (13)	Jim Barry	NWS	10	Jan 14, 1908	21 years, 316 days	Pacific A.C., Los Angeles, California, US	
74	Win	40–6–16 (12)	Jim Barry	PTS	10	Dec 17, 1907	21 years, 288 days	Naud Junction Pavilion, Los Angeles, California, US	
73	Win	39–6–16 (12)	Young Peter Jackson	PTS	20	Nov 12, 1907	21 years, 253 days	Pacific A.C., Los Angeles, California, US	Won vacant world colored middleweight title
72	Win	38–6–16 (12)	Jim Barry	NWS	10	Oct 15, 1907	21 years, 225 days	Winnisimmet A.C., Chelsea, Massachusetts, US	
71	Win	38–6–16 (11)	Jim Barry	NWS	6	Sep 25, 1907	21 years, 205 days	Sharkey A.C., New York City, New York, US	
70	Win	38–6–16 (10)	Larry Temple	NWS	10	Aug 27, 1907	21 years, 176 days	Winnisimmet A.C., Chelsea, Massachusetts, US	Vacant world colored middleweight title at stake (via KO only)
69	Win	38–6–16 (9)	Geoff Thorne	KO	1 (10)	Jun 3, 1907	21 years, 91 days	National Sporting Club, Covent Garden, London, England	
68	Win	37–6–16 (9)	Tiger Smith	KO	4 (20), 0:57	Apr 22, 1907	21 years, 49 days	National Sporting Club, Covent Garden, London, England	Won vacant NSC British and Commonwealth middleweight titles
67	Win	36–6–16 (9)	Kid Williams	KO	6 (?)	Jan 31, 1907	20 years, 333 days	Rochester, New York, US	
66	Draw	35–6–16 (9)	Joe Jennette	PTS	12	Jan 11, 1907	20 years, 313 days	Unity Cycle Club, Lawrence, Massachusetts, US	
65	Win	35–6–15 (9)	George Gunther	TKO	3 (?)	Nov 29, 1906	20 years, 270 days	Haverhill, Massachusetts, US	
64	Win	34–6–15 (9)	Young Peter Jackson	PTS	15	Nov 21, 1906	20 years, 262 days	Rochester, New York, US	
63	Win	33–6–15 (9)	George Gunther	PTS	12	Nov 12, 1906	20 years, 253 days	Valley Falls A.C., Valley Falls, Rhode Island, US	
62	Loss	32–6–15 (9)	Young Peter Jackson	TKO	5 (?)	Jun 13, 1906	20 years, 101 days	Southbridge, Massachusetts, Massachusetts, US	
61	Loss	32–5–15 (9)	Jack Johnson	PTS	15	Apr 26, 1906	20 years, 53 days	Lincoln A.C., Chelsea, Massachusetts, US	For world colored heavyweight title
60	Win	32–4–15 (9)	Joe Jennette	PTS	15	Apr 5, 1906	20 years, 32 days	Lincoln A.C., Chelsea, Massachusetts, US	
59	Win	31–4–15 (9)	Black Fitzsimmons	TKO	11 (?)	Mar 19, 1906	20 years, 15 days	Lakeside A.C., Webster, Massachusetts, US	
58	Win	30–4–15 (9)	Larry Temple	KO	15 (15), 2:20	Mar 1, 1906	19 years, 362 days	Lincoln A.C., Chelsea, Massachusetts, US	
57	Loss	29–4–15 (9)	Joe Jennette	TKO	8 (12)	Dec 25, 1905	19 years, 296 days	Unity Cycle Club, Lawrence, Massachusetts, US	Langford retired after round 8.
56	NC	29–3–15 (9)	Jack Blackburn	NC	1 (6)	Oct 7, 1905	19 years, 217 days	National A.C., Philadelphia, Pennsylvania, US	It was quickly evident that Langford and Blackburn agreed to participate only if the fight was faked, so it was stopped
55	Draw	29–3–15 (8)	Young Peter Jackson	PTS	15	Sep 29, 1905	19 years, 209 days	Germania Maennerchor Hall, Baltimore, Maryland, US	
54	Draw	29–3–14 (8)	Jack Blackburn	PTS	10	Sep 20, 1905	19 years, 200 days	Lyric A.C., Allentown, Pennsylvania, US	
53	Draw	29–3–13 (8)	Larry Temple	PTS	15	Sep 7, 1905	19 years, 187 days	Highland A.C., Marlborough, Massachusetts, US	
52	Win	29–3–12 (8)	Jack Blackburn	PTS	15	Aug 18, 1905	19 years, 167 days	Leiperville, Pennsylvania, US	
51	Loss	28–3–12 (8)	Larry Temple	PTS	15	Jul 4, 1905	19 years, 122 days	Marlborough, Massachusetts, US	
50	Win	28–2–12 (8)	Young Peter Jackson	PTS	15	Jun 16, 1905	19 years, 104 days	Douglas A.C., Chelsea, Massachusetts, US	
49	Win	27–2–12 (8)	Young Peter Jackson	PTS	15	May 26, 1905	19 years, 83 days	Highland A.C., Marlborough, Massachusetts, US	
48	Win	26–2–12 (8)	Bogardus Hyde	TKO	3 (15)	May 16, 1905	19 years, 73 days	Music Hall, Webster, Massachusetts, US	
47	Win	25–2–12 (8)	George Gunther	PTS	12	Mar 13, 1905	19 years, 9 days	Auditorium, Portland, Maine, US	
46	NC	24–2–12 (8)	George Cole	NC	9 (15)	Mar 3, 1905	18 years, 364 days	Chelsea, Massachusetts, US	The fight was called "no contest" because of a lack of action
45	Win	24–2–12 (7)	Dave Holly	NWS	15	Feb 13, 1905	18 years, 346 days	Apollo A.C., Salem, Massachusetts, US	
44	Win	24–2–12 (6)	George Gunther	TKO	11 (?)	Jan 20, 1905	18 years, 322 days	Douglas A.C., Chelsea, Massachusetts, US	
43	Win	23–2–12 (6)	Joe Reed	KO	5 (12)	Jan 16, 1905	18 years, 318 days	Music Hall, Webster, Massachusetts, US	
42	Win	22–2–12 (6)	Joe Reed	TKO	9 (?)	Dec 22, 1904	18 years, 293 days	Paper City A.C., Berlin, New Hampshire, US	
41	Draw	21–2–12 (6)	Jack Blackburn	PTS	15	Dec 9, 1904	18 years, 280 days	Marlborough Theater, Marlborough, Massachusetts, US	
40	Win	21–2–11 (6)	Tommy Sullivan	TKO	3 (12)	Nov 25, 1904	18 years, 266 days	Highland A.C., Marlborough, Massachusetts, US	
39	Win	20–2–11 (6)	Andy Watson	NWS	12	Nov 24, 1904	18 years, 265 days	Music Hall, Webster, Massachusetts, US	
38	Draw	20–2–11 (5)	Dave Holly	NWS	6	Nov 4, 1904	18 years, 245 days	Manhattan A.C., Philadelphia, Pennsylvania, US	
37	Draw	20–2–11 (4)	Dave Holly	PTS	15	Sep 30, 1904	18 years, 210 days	Eureka A.C., Baltimore, Maryland, US	
36	Draw	20–2–10 (4)	Barbados Joe Walcott	PTS	15	Sep 5, 1904	18 years, 185 days	Lake Massabesic Coliseum, Manchester, New Hampshire, US	For world welterweight title
35	Win	20–2–9 (4)	George 'Elbows' McFadden	TKO	2 (15)	Jul 29, 1904	18 years, 147 days	Manchester, New Hampshire, US	
34	Loss	19–2–9 (4)	Dave Holly	PTS	10	Apr 11, 1904	18 years, 38 days	Cambridge A.A., Cambridge, Massachusetts, US	
33	Win	19–1–9 (4)	Willie Lewis	KO	2 (12)	Feb 22, 1904	17 years, 355 days	Warren A.C., New Bedford, Massachusetts, US	
32	Win	18–1–9 (4)	Charles Johnson	TKO	5 (?)	Feb 13, 1904	17 years, 346 days	Central A.C., Boston, Massachusetts, US	
31	Win	17–1–9 (4)	Belfield Walcott	NWS	6	Jan 27, 1904	17 years, 329 days	Central A.C., Boston, Massachusetts, US	
30	Draw	17–1–9 (3)	Jack Blackburn	NWS	6	Jan 11, 1904	17 years, 313 days	Washington S.C., Philadelphia, Pennsylvania, US	
29	Draw	17–1–9 (2)	Andy Watson	PTS	12	Jan 6, 1904	17 years, 308 days	North Street Rink, Salem, Massachusetts, US	
28	Draw	17–1–8 (2)	Jack Blackburn	PTS	12	Dec 23, 1903	17 years, 294 days	Central A.C., Boston, Massachusetts, US	
27	Win	17–1–7 (2)	Joe Gans	PTS	15	Dec 8, 1903	17 years, 279 days	Criterion A.C., Boston, Massachusetts, US	
26	Win	16–1–7 (2)	Joe Reed	DQ	4 (?)	Nov 28, 1903	17 years, 269 days	Central A.C., Boston, Massachusetts, US	Reed threw Langford and was disqualified.
25	Win	15–1–7 (2)	Patsy Sweeney	KO	12 (12), 2:38	Nov 20, 1903	17 years, 261 days	Lenox A.C., Boston, Massachusetts, US	
24	Win	14–1–7 (2)	Arthur Cote	TKO	5 (12)	Oct 5, 1903	17 years, 215 days	American A.C., Boston, Massachusetts, US	
23	Win	13–1–7 (2)	Shadow Morris	PTS	12	Sep 15, 1903	17 years, 195 days	Central A.C., Boston, Massachusetts, US	
22	Win	12–1–7 (2)	Kid Griffo	PTS	12	Aug 28, 1903	17 years, 177 days	Lenox A.C., Boston, Massachusetts, US	
21	Win	11–1–7 (2)	Belfield Walcott	PTS	20	Jul 16, 1903	17 years, 134 days	Saundersville Athletic Club, Scituate, Rhode Island, US	
20	Loss	10–1–7 (2)	Danny Duane	PTS	12	Jun 26, 1903	17 years, 114 days	Lenox A.C., Boston, Massachusetts, US	
19	Win	10–0–7 (2)	Walter Burgo	TKO	8 (?)	Jun 19, 1903	17 years, 107 days	Lenox A.C., Boston, Massachusetts, US	
18	Draw	9–0–7 (2)	Andy Watson	PTS	12	Jun 15, 1903	17 years, 103 days	Gloucester A.C., Gloucester, Massachusetts, US	
17	Win	9–0–6 (2)	Tim Kearns	TKO	2 (12)	Jun 5, 1903	17 years, 93 days	Lenox A.C., Boston, Massachusetts, US	Kearns quit with an arm injury.
16	Draw	8–0–6 (2)	Andy Watson	PTS	12	May 29, 1903	17 years, 86 days	Lenox A.C., Boston, Massachusetts, US	
15	Win	8–0–5 (2)	Chick Monahan	KO	1 (10)	May 26, 1903	17 years, 83 days	Criterion A.C., Boston, Massachusetts, US	
14	Win	7–0–5 (2)	Billy Jordan	PTS	6	May 25, 1903	17 years, 82 days	Cambridge Athletic Club, Boston, Massachusetts, US	
13	Draw	6–0–5 (2)	Andy Watson	PTS	10	May 8, 1903	17 years, 65 days	Lenox A.C., Boston, Massachusetts, US	Pre-arranged draw if lasting the distance
12	ND	6–0–4 (2)	Andy Watson	ND	12	Apr 20, 1903	17 years, 47 days	West End A.C., Lawrence, Massachusetts, US	
11	Win	6–0–4 (1)	Stonewall Allen	PTS	6	Apr 16, 1903	17 years, 43 days	Essex A.C., Boston, Massachusetts, US	
10	Draw	5–0–4 (1)	Stonewall Allen	PTS	6	Apr 3, 1903	17 years, 30 days	Lenox A.C., Boston, Massachusetts, US	
9	Win	5–0–3 (1)	John E. Butler	PTS	6	Mar 26, 1903	17 years, 22 days	Essex A.C., Boston, Massachusetts, US	
8	Draw	4–0–3 (1)	Johnny Johnson	PTS	6	Mar 5, 1903	17 years, 1 day	Essex A.C., Boston, Massachusetts, US	
7	Win	4–0–2 (1)	Sadler Jennings	KO	2 (6)	Mar 4, 1903	17 years, 0 days	Highland Athletic Club, Chelsea, Massachusetts, US	
6	Win	3–0–2 (1)	Luther Manual	PTS	10	Feb 27, 1903	16 years, 360 days	Lenox A.C., Boston, Massachusetts, US	
5	Draw	2–0–2 (1)	Luther Manual	PTS	6	Feb 6, 1903	16 years, 339 days	Lenox A.C., Boston, Massachusetts, US	
4	Draw	2–0–1 (1)	Luther Manual	PTS	4	Jan 23, 1903	16 years, 325 days	Essex A.C., Boston, Massachusetts, US	
3	ND	2–0 (1)	Billy Chisholm	ND	6	Jan 22, 1903	16 years, 324 days	Lawrence, Massachusetts, US	
2	Win	2–0	Arthur Pratt	KO	1 (6)	Jan 15, 1903	16 years, 317 days	Essex A.C., Boston, Massachusetts, US	
1	Win	1–0	Jack McVicker	KO	5 (6)	Apr 11, 1902	16 years, 38 days	Lenox A.C., Boston, Massachusetts, US	

=== Unofficial record ===
314 fights	210 wins	44 losses
By knockout	126	8
By decision	81	36
By disqualification	3	0
Draws	52	
No contests	8	

Record with the inclusion of newspaper decisions in the win/loss/draw column.

No.	Result	Record	Opponent	Type	Round, time	Date	Age	Location	Notes
314	Loss	210–44–52 (8)	Brad Simmons	TKO	1 (10)	Aug 2, 1925	39 years, 151 days	Drumright, Oklahoma, US	Langford retired completely blind
313	Win	210–43–52 (8)	Young Jack Johnson	KO	2 (?)	Jul 1, 1925	39 years, 119 days	Shawnee, Oklahoma, US	
312	Loss	209–43–52 (8)	Battling Gahee	PTS	8	Sep 25, 1925	N/A	Location unknown	Exact date unknown
311	Win	209–42–52 (8)	Frolin Gonzales	PTS	10	Apr 5, 1925	39 years, 32 days	Mexico	Reported but not confirmed
310	Draw	208–42–52 (8)	Tim Sullivan	PTS	6	Mar 1, 1925	N/A	Location unknown	Exact date unknown
309	Draw	208–42–51 (8)	Tim Sullivan	PTS	6	Jan 1, 1925	N/A	Location unknown	Exact date unknown
308	Win	208–42–50 (8)	Smiling 'Kid' Nolan	KO	2 (?)	Sep 10, 1924	38 years, 190 days	Mexico City, Distrito Federal, Mexico	Reported but not confirmed
307	Win	207–42–50 (8)	Sydney Grant	KO	4 (?)	Jul 7, 1924	38 years, 125 days	Mexico City, Distrito Federal, Mexico	Reported but not confirmed
306	Win	206–42–50 (8)	Eddie Tremblay	KO	3 (4)	May 4, 1924	38 years, 61 days	Venice, California, US	Reported but not confirmed
305	Loss	205–42–50 (8)	Eddie Tremblay	PTS	4	Apr 23, 1924	38 years, 50 days	Venice, California, US	
304	Win	205–41–50 (8)	Sammy Olson	PTS	4	Apr 18, 1924	38 years, 45 days	Bakersfield Stadium, Bakersfield, California, US	
303	ND	204–41–50 (8)	Jim Jam Barry	ND	4	Apr 16, 1924	38 years, 43 days	San Fernando Stadium, San Fernando, California, US	Bout went four rounds. San Fernando Sun did not give result of decision though.
302	Win	204–41–50 (7)	Jim Jam Barry	PTS	4	Apr 4, 1924	38 years, 31 days	Huntington Beach, California, US	
301	Win	203–41–50 (7)	Smiling 'Kid' Nolan	KO	5 (?)	Mar 6, 1924	38 years, 2 days	Venice, California, US	Reported but not confirmed
300	Win	202–41–50 (7)	Tom Riley	KO	2 (?)	Jan 20, 1924	37 years, 322 days	Ciudad Juarez, Chihuahua, Mexico	
299	Win	201–41–50 (7)	Fireman Jim Flynn	PTS	8	Jan 6, 1924	37 years, 308 days	Ford's Arena, Ciudad Juarez, Chihuahua, Mexico	
298	Loss	200–41–50 (7)	Sonny Goodrich	PTS	10	Dec 18, 1923	37 years, 289 days	Community House, San Antonio, Texas, US	For Mexico heavyweight title
297	Win	200–40–50 (7)	Roscoe Hall	KO	1 (?)	Dec 11, 1923	37 years, 282 days	Mexico City, Distrito Federal, Mexico	Reported but not confirmed
296	Win	199–40–50 (7)	Andrés Balsa	TKO	8 (15)	Nov 10, 1923	37 years, 251 days	Teatro Independencia, Monterrey, Nuevo León, Mexico	
295	Win	198–40–50 (7)	Fireman Jim Flynn	KO	3 (15)	Oct 19, 1923	37 years, 229 days	Mexico City, Distrito Federal, Mexico	
294	Loss	197–40–50 (7)	Bearcat Wright	KO	9 (?)	Aug 15, 1923	37 years, 164 days	Mexico City, Distrito Federal, Mexico	
293	Win	197–39–50 (7)	Fireman Jim Flynn	PTS	10	Aug 2, 1923	37 years, 151 days	Mexico City, Distrito Federal, Mexico	
292	Loss	196–39–50 (7)	Clem Johnson	TKO	13 (15), 1:25	Jul 27, 1923	37 years, 145 days	Plaza de Toros, Ciudad Juarez, Chihuahua, Mexico	Lost Mexico heavyweight title
291	Win	196–38–50 (7)	Jim Tracey	KO	4 (20)	Jul 15, 1923	37 years, 133 days	Mexico City, Distrito Federal, Mexico	Retained Mexico heavyweight title
290	Win	195–38–50 (7)	Jack Voight	KO	5 (15)	May 19, 1923	37 years, 76 days	El Toreo de Cuatro Caminos, Mexico City, Distrito Federal, Mexico	Retained Mexico heavyweight title
289	Win	194–38–50 (7)	Art Surans	KO	3 (?)	May 16, 1923	37 years, 73 days	Mexico City, Distrito Federal, Mexico	Retained Mexico heavyweight title
288	Win	193–38–50 (7)	Andrés Balsa	KO	3	May 6, 1923	37 years, 63 days	Mexico City, Distrito Federal, Mexico	Scheduled as a "finish fight"
287	Win	192–38–50 (7)	Andrés Balsa	PTS	10	Apr 28, 1923	37 years, 55 days	Arena Cine Imperio, Torreon, Coahuila de Zaragoza, Mexico	
286	Win	191–38–50 (7)	Chihuahua 'Kid' Brown	PTS	15	Apr 15, 1923	37 years, 42 days	Plaza de Toros, Torreon, Coahuila de Zaragoza, Mexico	
285	Win	190–38–50 (7)	Andrés Balsa	TKO	6 (15)	Apr 8, 1923	37 years, 35 days	Mexico City, Distrito Federal, Mexico	Retained Mexico heavyweight title
284	Win	189–38–50 (7)	Jack Savage	KO	1 (?)	Mar 31, 1923	37 years, 27 days	Chapultepec Bull Ring, Mexico City, Distrito Federal, Mexico	Won Mexico heavyweight title
283	Win	188–38–50 (7)	Chihuahua 'Kid' Brown	KO	1 (10)	Mar 17, 1923	37 years, 13 days	Mexico City, Distrito Federal, Mexico	
282	Win	187–38–50 (7)	Jim Tracey	KO	6 (?)	Mar 2, 1923	36 years, 363 days	Mexico City, Distrito Federal, Mexico	
281	Win	186–38–50 (7)	Tom McCarty	KO	2 (?)	Feb 15, 1923	36 years, 348 days	Albuquerque, New Mexico, US	
280	Win	185–38–50 (7)	Sonny Goodrich	TKO	7 (12)	Dec 25, 1922	36 years, 296 days	Market House Arena, San Antonio, Texas, US	
279	Win	184–38–50 (7)	Roscoe Hall	KO	3 (?)	Dec 24, 1922	36 years, 295 days	Mexico	Reported but not confirmed
278	Win	183–38–50 (7)	Jack Taylor	KO	8 (?)	Dec 12, 1922	36 years, 283 days	Mexico	
277	Draw	182–38–50 (7)	Jim Jam Barry	PTS	10	Nov 10, 1922	36 years, 251 days	Douglas, Arizona, US	
276	Draw	182–38–49 (7)	Jack Taylor	PTS	15	Nov 5, 1922	36 years, 246 days	Ciudad Juarez, Chihuahua, Mexico	
275	Win	182–38–48 (7)	Jack Taylor	PTS	15	Oct 20, 1922	36 years, 230 days	Ciudad Juarez, Chihuahua, Mexico	
274	Win	181–38–48 (7)	Cyclone Smith	KO	2 (?)	Oct 6, 1922	36 years, 216 days	El Paso, Texas, US	
273	Win	180–38–48 (7)	Battling Owens	KO	7 (15)	Sep 22, 1922	36 years, 202 days	Ciudad Juarez, Chihuahua, Mexico	
272	Draw	179–38–48 (7)	Jack Taylor	NWS	10	Aug 21, 1922	36 years, 170 days	Mizzou Park, Sioux City, Iowa, US	
271	Draw	179–38–47 (7)	Brad Simmons	NWS	10	Aug 11, 1922	36 years, 160 days	Wichita, Kansas, US	
270	Win	179–38–46 (7)	Bill Tate	PTS	12	Aug 4, 1922	36 years, 153 days	Tulsa, Oklahoma, US	
269	Win	178–38–46 (7)	Bearcat Wright	RTD	5 (12)	Jul 17, 1922	36 years, 135 days	Tulsa, Oklahoma, US	
268	Draw	177–38–46 (7)	Bearcat Wright	PTS	12	Jun 19, 1922	36 years, 107 days	City Auditorium, Galveston, Texas, US	
267	Win	177–38–45 (7)	Tiger Flowers	KO	2 (10)	Jun 5, 1922	36 years, 93 days	Ponce de Leon Ballpark, Atlanta, Georgia, US	
266	Draw	176–38–45 (7)	Ted Jamieson	PTS	10	May 22, 1922	36 years, 79 days	Private club, Chicago, Illinois, US	
265	Win	176–38–44 (7)	Roscoe Hall	KO	4 (8)	May 16, 1922	36 years, 73 days	Bijou Ring, Nashville, Tennessee, US	
264	Win	175–38–44 (7)	Roscoe Hall	KO	2 (8)	Apr 20, 1922	36 years, 47 days	Venice A.C., Memphis, Tennessee, US	
263	Win	174–38–44 (7)	Jack Leslie	NWS	10	Apr 15, 1922	36 years, 42 days	Indianapolis, Indiana, US	
262	Loss	173–38–44 (7)	Tut Jackson	DQ	5 (12)	Apr 6, 1922	36 years, 33 days	Triangle Park, Dayton, Ohio, US	
261	Loss	173–37–44 (7)	Bill Tate	PTS	8	Mar 27, 1922	36 years, 23 days	Memphis, Tennessee, US	
260	Win	173–36–44 (7)	Cyclone Smith	KO	2 (10)	Mar 17, 1922	36 years, 13 days	Clyffeside Park, Ashland, Kentucky, US	
259	Loss	172–36–44 (7)	Harry Wills	PTS	10	Jan 17, 1922	35 years, 319 days	Arena, Milwaukie, Oregon, US	For world colored heavyweight title claim
258	Win	172–35–44 (7)	Young Peter Jackson	NWS	10	Dec 9, 1921	35 years, 280 days	Illinois Theatre, Urbana, Illinois, US	
257	Win	171–35–44 (7)	Lee Anderson	PTS	10	Dec 7, 1921	35 years, 278 days	Tucson, Arizona, US	
256	Loss	170–35–44 (7)	Lee Anderson	PTS	10	Nov 24, 1921	35 years, 265 days	Capital City Arena, Phoenix, Arizona, US	
255	Win	170–34–44 (7)	Young Peter Jackson	KO	2 (10)	Oct 18, 1921	35 years, 228 days	The Armouries, Toronto, Ontario, Canada	Not to be confused with Young Peter Jackson
254	Loss	169–34–44 (7)	Bill Tate	NWS	12	Sep 21, 1921	35 years, 201 days	Riverside Arena, Covington, Kentucky, US	
253	Loss	169–33–44 (7)	Lee Anderson	NWS	12	Sep 5, 1921	35 years, 185 days	Coliseum, Fort Worth, Texas, US	
252	Draw	169–32–44 (7)	Topeka Jack Johnson	PTS	6	Aug 19, 1921	35 years, 168 days	State Fairgrounds, Topeka, Kansas, US	
251	Win	169–32–43 (7)	George Godfrey	KO	1 (12)	Aug 17, 1921	35 years, 166 days	Riverside Arena, Covington, Kentucky, US	
250	Win	168–32–43 (7)	Lee Anderson	PTS	10	Aug 12, 1921	35 years, 161 days	Omaha, Nebraska, US	
249	Win	167–32–43 (7)	Bearcat Wright	KO	9 (10)	Jul 20, 1921	35 years, 138 days	Omaha, Nebraska, US	
248	Win	166–32–43 (7)	Bill Watkins	KO	?	Feb 7, 1921	N/A	Canada	Exact date, location and # of rounds unknown
247	Win	165–32–43 (7)	Alfred Johnson	KO	?	Feb 6, 1921	N/A	Canada	Exact date, location and # of rounds unknown
246	Draw	164–32–43 (7)	Jack Thompson	PTS	10	Feb 3, 1921	N/A	Canada	Exact date unknown
245	Win	164–32–42 (7)	Bob Devere	TKO	7 (10)	Jan 14, 1921	34 years, 316 days	Armory, Portland, Oregon, US	
244	Draw	163–32–42 (7)	Lee Anderson	PTS	12	Jan 7, 1921	34 years, 309 days	Omaha, Nebraska, US	
243	Win	163–32–41 (7)	Jim Jam Barry	PTS	10	Dec 29, 1920	34 years, 300 days	Armory, Portland, Oregon, US	
242	Win	162–32–41 (7)	Clem Johnson	PTS	10	Dec 23, 1920	34 years, 294 days	Aberdeen, Washington, US	
241	Win	161–32–41 (7)	Terry Kellar	PTS	6	Dec 9, 1920	34 years, 280 days	Aberdeen, Washington, US	
240	Win	160–32–41 (7)	Tiny Jim Herman	TKO	7 (10)	Dec 2, 1920	34 years, 273 days	Heilig Theater, Portland, Oregon, US	
239	Win	159–32–41 (7)	George Godfrey	KO	2 (10)	Nov 17, 1920	34 years, 258 days	Hot Springs, Arkansas, US	
238	Win	158–32–41 (7)	Jack Thompson	PTS	8	Nov 15, 1920	34 years, 256 days	Southern A.C., Memphis, Tennessee, US	
237	Loss	157–32–41 (7)	Lee Anderson	PTS	10	Oct 20, 1920	34 years, 230 days	Heilig Theater, Portland, Oregon, US	
236	Win	157–31–41 (7)	Frank Farmer	PTS	4	Oct 13, 1920	34 years, 223 days	Arena, Seattle, Washington, US	
235	Win	156–31–41 (7)	Tiny Jim Herman	KO	7 (10)	Oct 6, 1920	34 years, 216 days	Heilig Theater, Portland, Oregon, US	
234	Loss	155–31–41 (7)	Bill Tate	NWS	6	Sep 6, 1920	34 years, 186 days	Floyd Fitzsimmons Arena, Benton Harbor, Michigan, US	
233	Win	155–30–41 (7)	Bearcat Wright	PTS	10	Aug 30, 1920	34 years, 179 days	Walthill, Nebraska, US	
232	Win	154–30–41 (7)	Sam McVea	NWS	10	Aug 14, 1920	34 years, 163 days	East Chicago, Indiana, US	
231	Win	153–30–41 (7)	Pinky Lewis	KO	7 (8), 1:30	Jul 26, 1920	34 years, 144 days	Southern A.C., Memphis, Tennessee, US	
230	Win	152–30–41 (7)	Jack Mitchell	KO	3 (10)	Jul 2, 1920	34 years, 120 days	Springfield, Missouri, US	
229	Win	151–30–41 (7)	Rough House Ware	KO	9 (15)	Jun 7, 1920	34 years, 95 days	Tulane Arena, New Orleans, Louisiana, US	
228	Win	150–30–41 (7)	Jeff Clark	PTS	15	May 31, 1920	34 years, 88 days	Columbus, Ohio, US	
227	Win	149–30–41 (7)	Marty Cutler	TKO	3 (10)	May 18, 1920	34 years, 75 days	Armouries, Windsor, Ontario, Canada	
226	Draw	148–30–41 (7)	George Godfrey	PTS	10	May 1, 1920	N/A	Canada	Exact date unknown
225	Loss	148–30–40 (7)	Harry Wills	PTS	15	Apr 23, 1920	34 years, 50 days	Detroit, Michigan, US	For world colored heavyweight title
224	Win	148–29–40 (7)	Silas Green	KO	3 (10)	Apr 9, 1920	34 years, 36 days	Detroit, Michigan, US	
223	Win	147–29–40 (7)	Jack Thompson	PTS	15	Apr 5, 1920	34 years, 32 days	Convention Hall, Muskogee, Oklahoma, US	
222	Win	146–29–40 (7)	Jamaica Kid	TKO	7 (12)	Mar 29, 1920	34 years, 25 days	Columbus, Ohio, US	
221	Win	145–29–40 (7)	Battling Gahee	KO	2 (8)	Feb 23, 1920	33 years, 356 days	Southern A.C., Memphis, Tennessee, US	
220	Draw	144–29–40 (7)	Jeff Clark	NWS	10	Feb 16, 1920	33 years, 349 days	K of C Hall, Terre Haute, Indiana, US	
219	Win	144–29–39 (7)	Jeff Clark	NWS	10	Jan 16, 1920	33 years, 318 days	Kalamazoo, Michigan, US	
218	Win	143–29–39 (7)	Dave McBride	KO	1 (?), 1:00	Dec 3, 1919	33 years, 274 days	Liberty Theater, Camp Grant, Illinois, US	
217	NC	142–29–39 (7)	Jack Thompson	NC	6 (10)	Nov 24, 1919	33 years, 265 days	Shrine Auditorium, Duluth, Minnesota, US	Both fighters were fined $500 for stalling
216	Win	142–29–39 (6)	Mexican Jim Johnson	KO	9 (15)	Nov 17, 1919	33 years, 258 days	Auditorium, Sioux City, Iowa, US	
215	Loss	141–29–39 (6)	Harry Wills	PTS	15	Nov 5, 1919	33 years, 246 days	Convention Hall, Tulsa, Oklahoma, US	For world colored heavyweight title
214	Draw	141–28–39 (6)	Jack Thompson	PTS	15	Oct 21, 1919	33 years, 231 days	Tulsa, Oklahoma, US	bout was advertised for the colored heavyweight championship
213	Loss	141–28–38 (6)	Harry Wills	NWS	10	Sep 30, 1919	33 years, 210 days	Arena, Syracuse, New York, US	
212	Win	141–27–38 (6)	Rough House Wilson	KO	4 (10)	Sep 18, 1919	33 years, 198 days	Battle Creek, Michigan, US	
211	Win	140–27–38 (6)	Bill Tate	NWS	10	Aug 23, 1919	33 years, 172 days	Grand Rapids, Michigan, US	
210	Draw	139–27–38 (6)	Jack Thompson	PTS	15	Aug 4, 1919	33 years, 153 days	Tulsa, Oklahoma, US	
209	Loss	139–27–37 (6)	Harry Wills	NWS	8	Jul 4, 1919	33 years, 122 days	Sportsman's Park, Saint Louis, Missouri, US	World colored heavyweight title at stake; (via KO only)
208	Win	139–26–37 (6)	Bill Tate	DQ	5 (10)	Jun 19, 1919	33 years, 107 days	Nicollet Park, Minneapolis, Minnesota, US	Tate was disqualified for holding
207	Win	138–26–37 (6)	Billy Hooper	KO	4 (10)	Apr 30, 1919	33 years, 57 days	Springer Opera House, Columbus, Georgia, US	
206	Loss	137–26–37 (6)	Willie Meehan	PTS	4	Mar 4, 1919	33 years, 0 days	Coliseum, San Francisco, California, US	
205	Loss	137–25–37 (6)	Fred Fulton	PTS	4	Dec 27, 1918	32 years, 298 days	Civic Auditorium, San Francisco, California, US	
204	Win	137–24–37 (6)	Jeff Clark	PTS	8	Dec 16, 1918	32 years, 287 days	Nashville, Tennessee, US	
203	Win	136–24–37 (6)	Big Boy Butler	KO	5 (10)	Dec 12, 1918	32 years, 283 days	Empire Theatre, Rock Island, Illinois, US	
202	Loss	135–24–37 (6)	Jeff Clark	NWS	6	Nov 28, 1918	32 years, 269 days	Olympia A.C., Philadelphia, Pennsylvania, US	
201	Draw	135–23–37 (6)	Jeff Clark	PTS	10	Nov 15, 1918	32 years, 256 days	Atlanta, Georgia, US	
200	Draw	135–23–36 (6)	Jeff Clark	PTS	12	Oct 31, 1918	32 years, 241 days	Crescent Rink, Lowell, Massachusetts, US	
199	Win	135–23–35 (6)	Battling Jim Johnson	NWS	8	Aug 22, 1918	32 years, 171 days	Lafayette A.C., Saint Louis, Missouri, US	
198	Win	134–23–35 (6)	Rough House Ware	KO	9 (15)	Aug 19, 1918	32 years, 168 days	Tulsa, Oklahoma, US	
197	Win	133–23–35 (6)	Jack Thompson	NWS	6	Aug 8, 1918	32 years, 157 days	Shibe Park, Philadelphia, Pennsylvania, US	
196	Win	132–23–35 (6)	Battling Jim Johnson	NWS	8	Aug 5, 1918	32 years, 154 days	Atlantic City S.C., Atlantic City, New Jersey, US	
195	Win	131–23–35 (6)	Battling Jim Johnson	PTS	10	Jun 19, 1918	32 years, 107 days	Auditorium, Atlanta, Georgia, US	
194	Loss	130–23–35 (6)	Harry Wills	TKO	8 (20)	May 19, 1918	32 years, 76 days	Plaza de Toros Vista Alegre, Panama City, Panama	For world colored heavyweight title
193	Loss	130–22–35 (6)	Harry Wills	KO	6 (20)	Apr 14, 1918	32 years, 41 days	Plaza de Toros Vista Alegre, Panama City, Panama	Lost world colored heavyweight title
192	Win	130–21–35 (6)	Kid Norfolk	KO	2 (20)	Dec 17, 1917	31 years, 288 days	Stockyards Stadium, Denver, Colorado, US	Retained world colored heavyweight title
191	Draw	129–21–35 (6)	Harry Wills	NWS	12	Nov 12, 1917	31 years, 253 days	Coliseum, Toledo, Ohio, US	World colored heavyweight title at stake (via KO only)
190	Loss	129–21–34 (6)	Harry Wills	NWS	10	Sep 20, 1917	31 years, 200 days	Clermont Avenue Rink, New York City, New York, US	World colored heavyweight title at stake (via KO only)
189	Win	129–20–34 (6)	Andy Johnson	KO	2 (15)	Sep 17, 1917	31 years, 197 days	Maryland A.C., Ardmore, Maryland, US	
188	Win	128–20–34 (6)	Joe Jennette	NWS	12	Sep 14, 1917	31 years, 194 days	Coliseum, Toledo, Ohio, US	World colored heavyweight title at stake (via KO only)
187	Win	127–20–34 (6)	Andre Anderson	TKO	2 (?)	Aug 17, 1917	31 years, 166 days	Urban Liberty Park, Buffalo, New York, US	
186	Loss	126–20–34 (6)	Fred Fulton	TKO	7 (12)	Jun 19, 1917	31 years, 100 days	Armory A.A., Boston, Massachusetts, US	
185	Loss	126–19–34 (6)	Harry Wills	NWS	6	May 11, 1917	31 years, 68 days	Cambria A.C., Philadelphia, Pennsylvania, US	
184	Win	126–18–34 (6)	Bill Tate	KO	5 (12)	May 1, 1917	31 years, 58 days	Future City A.C., Saint Louis, Missouri, US	Won world colored heavyweight title
183	Win	125–18–34 (6)	Bob Devere	NWS	10	Apr 20, 1917	31 years, 47 days	Harlem S.C., New York City, New York, US	
182	Win	124–18–34 (6)	Jack Thompson	NWS	10	Apr 10, 1917	31 years, 37 days	Broadway S.C., New York City, New York, US	
181	Loss	123–18–34 (6)	Bill Tate	PTS	12	Jan 25, 1917	30 years, 327 days	Grand Opera House, Kansas City, Missouri, US	Lost world colored heavyweight title
180	Win	123–17–34 (6)	Battling Jim Johnson	PTS	12	Jan 1, 1917	30 years, 303 days	Academy A.C., Kansas City, Missouri, US	Retained world colored heavyweight title
179	Win	122–17–34 (6)	Bob Devere	NWS	10	Dec 29, 1916	30 years, 300 days	Montreal, Quebec, Canada	
178	Win	121–17–34 (6)	Battling Jim Johnson	KO	12 (12), 2:30	Dec 12, 1916	30 years, 283 days	Future City A.C., Saint Louis, Missouri, US	Retained world colored heavyweight title
177	Draw	120–17–34 (6)	Bill Tate	NWS	10	Nov 30, 1916	30 years, 271 days	Arena, Syracuse, New York, US	
176	Draw	120–17–33 (6)	Sam McVea	PTS	20	Aug 12, 1916	30 years, 161 days	Teatro Roma, Avellaneda, Buenos Aires, Argentina	Retained world colored heavyweight title
175	Win	120–17–32 (6)	Joe Jennette	KO	7 (10)	May 12, 1916	30 years, 69 days	Arena, Syracuse, New York, US	Retained world colored heavyweight title claim; Won undisputed world colored heavyweight title
174	Draw	119–17–32 (6)	Sam McVea	NWS	12	May 2, 1916	30 years, 59 days	East Market St. Rink, Akron, Ohio, US	World colored heavyweight title claim at stake (via KO only)
173	Loss	119–17–31 (6)	Harry Wills	NWS	8	Apr 25, 1916	30 years, 52 days	Coliseum, Saint Louis, Missouri, US	World colored heavyweight title claim at stake (via KO only)
172	Win	119–16–31 (6)	Sam McVea	NWS	10	Apr 7, 1916	30 years, 34 days	Arena, Syracuse, New York, US	World colored heavyweight title claim at stake (via KO only)
171	Win	118–16–31 (6)	Jeff Clark	TKO	5 (10)	Mar 31, 1916	30 years, 27 days	Future City A.C., Saint Louis, Missouri, US	Retained world colored heavyweight title claim
170	Win	117–16–31 (6)	Dave Mills	TKO	2 (10)	Mar 23, 1916	30 years, 19 days	Arena, Syracuse, New York, US	Retained world colored heavyweight title claim
169	Loss	116–16–31 (6)	Harry Wills	NWS	10	Mar 7, 1916	30 years, 3 days	Broadway Arena, New York City, New York, US	World colored heavyweight title claim at stake (via KO only)
168	Win	116–15–31 (6)	Cleve Hawkins	NWS	10	Feb 28, 1916	29 years, 361 days	Long Acre A.C., New York City, New York, US	World colored heavyweight title claim at stake (via KO only)
167	Win	115–15–31 (6)	Sam McVea	NWS	10	Feb 17, 1916	29 years, 350 days	Madison Square Garden, New York City, New York, US	
166	Win	114–15–31 (6)	Harry Wills	KO	19 (20)	Feb 11, 1916	29 years, 344 days	Tommy Burns Arena, New Orleans, Louisiana, US	Won world colored heavyweight title claim
165	Loss	113–15–31 (6)	Harry Wills	PTS	20	Jan 3, 1916	29 years, 305 days	Tulane A.C., New Orleans, Louisiana, US	For world colored heavyweight title claim
164	Loss	113–14–31 (6)	Harry Wills	NWS	10	Dec 3, 1915	29 years, 274 days	Harlem S.C., New York City, New York, US	World colored heavyweight title at stake (via KO only)
163	Draw	113–13–31 (6)	Sam McVea	NWS	10	Nov 23, 1915	29 years, 264 days	American A.C., New York City, New York, US	
162	Win	113–13–30 (6)	Battling Jim Johnson	PTS	15	Oct 18, 1915	29 years, 228 days	National A.C., Denver, Colorado, US	
161	Draw	112–13–30 (6)	Sam McVea	PTS	20	Sep 30, 1915	29 years, 210 days	Stockyards Stadium, Denver, Colorado, US	
160	Win	112–13–29 (6)	Jack Thompson	TKO	1 (15), 0:32	Jul 16, 1915	29 years, 134 days	National A.C., Denver, Colorado, US	
159	Loss	111–13–29 (6)	Sam McVea	PTS	12	Jun 29, 1915	29 years, 117 days	Atlas A.A., Boston, Massachusetts, US	For a claim of the world colored heavyweight title
158	Win	111–12–29 (6)	Battling Jim Johnson	NWS	10	Jun 8, 1915	29 years, 96 days	Broadway S.C., New York City, New York, US	
157	NC	110–12–29 (6)	Porky Dan Flynn	NC	8 (10)	Apr 19, 1915	29 years, 46 days	Montreal Sporting Club, Montreal, Quebec, Canada	Neither man appeared willing to really mix it as they boxed with open gloves despite repeated warnings from referee Rooney
156	Loss	110–12–29 (5)	Joe Jennette	PTS	12	Apr 13, 1915	29 years, 40 days	Atlas A.A., Boston, Massachusetts, US	Lost world colored heavyweight title
155	Win	110–11–29 (5)	Battling Jim Johnson	NWS	10	Apr 6, 1915	29 years, 33 days	135th Street A.C., New York City, New York, US	World colored heavyweight title at stake (via KO only)
154	Win	109–11–29 (5)	Harry Wills	KO	14 (20)	Nov 26, 1914	28 years, 267 days	Arena, Vernon, California, US	Retained world colored heavyweight title
153	Win	108–11–29 (5)	Jim Cameron	TKO	6 (8)	Nov 16, 1914	28 years, 257 days	Arctic Street Arena, San Diego, California, US	Retained world colored heavyweight title
152	Win	107–11–29 (5)	Tom McMahon	TKO	6 (20)	Nov 10, 1914	28 years, 251 days	Arena, Vernon, California, US	
151	Loss	106–11–29 (5)	Jeff Clark	NWS	10	Oct 26, 1914	28 years, 236 days	Joplin, Missouri, US	World colored heavyweight title at stake (via KO only)
150	Win	106–10–29 (5)	Gunboat Smith	KO	3 (12)	Oct 20, 1914	28 years, 230 days	Atlas A.A., Boston, Massachusetts, US	
149	Win	105–10–29 (5)	Colin Bell	TKO	4 (12)	Oct 6, 1914	28 years, 216 days	Atlas A.A., Boston, Massachusetts, US	
148	Draw	104–10–29 (5)	Joe Jennette	NWS	10	Oct 1, 1914	28 years, 211 days	Stadium A.C., New York City, New York, US	World colored heavyweight title at stake (via KO only)
147	Draw	104–10–28 (5)	Battling Jim Johnson	PTS	12	Sep 15, 1914	28 years, 195 days	Atlas A.A., Boston, Massachusetts, US	Retained world colored heavyweight title
146	Win	104–10–27 (5)	George 'Kid' Cotton	KO	4 (12)	Aug 25, 1914	28 years, 174 days	Atlas A.A., Boston, Massachusetts, US	Retained world colored heavyweight title
145	Win	103–10–27 (5)	Battling Jim Johnson	NWS	10	Aug 12, 1914	28 years, 161 days	Stadium A.C., New York City, New York, US	World colored heavyweight title claim at stake (via KO only)
144	Win	102–10–27 (5)	Bill Watkins	KO	4 (10)	May 25, 1914	28 years, 82 days	Olympic A.C., Rochester, New York, US	Retained world colored heavyweight title
143	Draw	101–10–27 (5)	Harry Wills	NWS	10	May 1, 1914	28 years, 58 days	National Baseball Park, New Orleans, Louisiana, US	World colored heavyweight title claim at stake (via KO only)
142	Win	101–10–26 (5)	Rough House Ware	TKO	5 (8)	Apr 20, 1914	28 years, 47 days	Memphis, Tennessee, US	
141	Win	100–10–26 (5)	George 'Kid' Cotton	PTS	8	Apr 15, 1914	28 years, 42 days	Chattanooga, Tennessee, US	Retained world colored heavyweight title
140	Win	99–10–26 (5)	Battling Jim Johnson	NWS	10	Mar 27, 1914	28 years, 23 days	Empire A.C., New York City, New York, US	World colored heavyweight title at stake (via KO only)
139	Win	98–10–26 (5)	Bill Watkins	TKO	1 (10)	Mar 23, 1914	28 years, 19 days	National S.C., New York City, New York, US	Retained world colored heavyweight title
138	Win	97–10–26 (5)	Matthew Curran	KO	1 (20), 0:30	Jan 24, 1914	27 years, 326 days	Luna Park Arena, Paris, France	
137	Win	96–10–26 (5)	Joe Jennette	PTS	20	Dec 20, 1913	27 years, 291 days	Luna Park Arena, Paris, France	Won vacant FBF world heavyweight title
136	Loss	95–10–26 (5)	Gunboat Smith	PTS	12	Nov 17, 1913	27 years, 258 days	Atlas A.A., Boston, Massachusetts, US	
135	Win	95–9–26 (5)	Jack Lester	RTD	5 (10)	Oct 27, 1913	27 years, 237 days	Taft, California, US	
134	Loss	94–9–26 (5)	Joe Jennette	NWS	10	Oct 3, 1913	27 years, 213 days	Madison Square Garden, New York City, New York, US	World colored heavyweight title at stake (via KO only)
133	Win	94–8–26 (5)	John Lester Johnson	KO	1 (10)	Sep 9, 1913	27 years, 189 days	Atlantic Garden A.C., New York City, New York, US	Retained world colored heavyweight title
132	Win	93–8–26 (5)	Porky Dan Flynn	KO	4 (12)	Aug 26, 1913	27 years, 175 days	Atlas A.A., Boston, Massachusetts, US	
131	Draw	92–8–26 (5)	Colin Bell	PTS	15	Jun 19, 1913	27 years, 107 days	Gymnasium Ground, Rockhampton, Queensland, Australia	
130	Draw	92–8–25 (5)	Sam McVea	PTS	20	Mar 24, 1913	27 years, 20 days	Olympic Stadium, Brisbane, Queensland, Australia	Retained world colored heavyweight title
129	Win	92–8–24 (5)	Jim Barry	KO	1 (20)	Mar 15, 1913	27 years, 11 days	Sydney Stadium, Sydney, New South Wales, Australia	
128	Win	91–8–24 (5)	Sam McVea	KO	13 (20)	Dec 26, 1912	26 years, 297 days	Sydney Stadium, Sydney, New South Wales, Australia	Retained Australian and world colored heavyweight titles
127	Win	90–8–24 (5)	Sam McVea	TKO	11 (20)	Oct 9, 1912	26 years, 219 days	Exhibition Stadium, Perth, Western Australia, Australia	Retained Australian and world colored heavyweight titles; McVea claimed he was fouled. The ref disagreed and McVea refused to continue
126	Win	89–8–24 (5)	Sam McVea	PTS	20	Aug 3, 1912	26 years, 152 days	Sydney Stadium, Sydney, New South Wales, Australia	Retained Australian and world colored heavyweight titles
125	Win	88–8–24 (5)	Porky Dan Flynn	TKO	14 (20)	May 27, 1912	26 years, 84 days	Athletic Pavilion, Melbourne, Victoria, Australia	
124	Win	87–8–24 (5)	Jim Barry	TKO	11 (20)	May 13, 1912	26 years, 70 days	Athletic Pavilion, Melbourne, Victoria, Australia	
123	Win	86–8–24 (5)	Sam McVea	PTS	20	Apr 8, 1912	26 years, 35 days	Sydney Stadium, Sydney, New South Wales, Australia	Won Australian and world colored heavyweight titles
122	Win	85–8–24 (5)	Jim Barry	PTS	20	Feb 12, 1912	25 years, 345 days	Sydney Stadium, Sydney, New South Wales, Australia	
121	Loss	84–8–24 (5)	Sam McVea	PTS	20	Dec 26, 1911	25 years, 297 days	Sydney Stadium, Sydney, New South Wales, Australia	Lost world colored heavyweight title
120	Win	84–7–24 (5)	Tony Caponi	TKO	3 (10)	Nov 6, 1911	25 years, 247 days	Twentieth Century A.C., New York City, New York, US	
119	Win	83–7–24 (5)	Joe Jennette	NWS	10	Sep 5, 1911	25 years, 185 days	Madison Square Garden, New York City, New York, US	World colored heavyweight title at stake (via KO only)
118	Win	82–7–24 (5)	Tony Ross	KO	6 (10)	Aug 24, 1911	25 years, 173 days	National Sporting Club, New York City, New York, US	
117	Win	81–7–24 (5)	Philadelphia Jack O'Brien	TKO	5 (10), 2:00	Aug 15, 1911	25 years, 164 days	Twentieth Century A.C., New York City, New York, US	
116	Win	80–7–24 (5)	Jim Smith	TKO	5 (10)	Aug 9, 1911	25 years, 158 days	Atlantic Garden A.C., New York City, New York, US	
115	ND	79–7–24 (5)	Jack Driscoll	ND	10	Jul 29, 1911	25 years, 147 days	Winnipeg, Manitoba, Canada	
114	Win	79–7–24 (4)	Jack Fitzgerald	TKO	5 (10)	Jun 29, 1911	25 years, 117 days	National S.C., New York City, New York, US	
113	Win	78–7–24 (4)	Tony Caponi	NWS	10	Jun 16, 1911	25 years, 104 days	Auditorium Rink, Winnipeg, Manitoba, Canada	
112	Win	77–7–24 (4)	Ralph Calloway	TKO	4 (10)	May 30, 1911	25 years, 87 days	Alhambra, Syracuse, New York, US	
111	Draw	76–7–24 (4)	Sam McVea	PTS	20	Apr 1, 1911	25 years, 28 days	Cirque de Paris, Paris, France	Retained world colored heavyweight title
110	Win	76–7–23 (4)	Bill Lang	DQ	6 (20)	Feb 21, 1911	24 years, 354 days	Olympia Annexe, Kensington, London, England	
109	Win	75–7–23 (4)	Fred Atwater	TKO	3 (?)	Jan 16, 1911	24 years, 318 days	State Armory, Utica, New York, US	
108	Win	74–7–23 (4)	Joe Jennette	PTS	12	Jan 10, 1911	24 years, 312 days	Armory A.A., Boston, Massachusetts, US	Retained world colored heavyweight title
107	Win	73–7–23 (4)	Morris Harris	KO	2 (12)	Dec 6, 1910	24 years, 277 days	Armory, Boston, Massachusetts, US	Retained world colored heavyweight title
106	Win	72–7–23 (4)	Jeff Clark	TKO	2 (10)	Nov 10, 1910	24 years, 251 days	Business Men's A.C., Joplin, Missouri, US	Retained world colored heavyweight title
105	Win	71–7–23 (4)	Joe Jennette	PTS	15	Sep 6, 1910	24 years, 186 days	Armory A.A., Boston, Massachusetts, US	Retained world colored heavyweight title claim Won world colored heavyweight title
104	Win	70–7–23 (4)	Al Kubiak	TKO	2 (10)	May 17, 1910	24 years, 74 days	Fairmont A.C., New York City, New York, US	
103	Win	69–7–23 (4)	Battling Jim Johnson	NWS	6	May 14, 1910	24 years, 71 days	National A.C., Philadelphia, Pennsylvania, US	World colored heavyweight title claim at stake (via KO only)
102	Win	68–7–23 (4)	Stanley Ketchel	NWS	6	Apr 27, 1910	24 years, 54 days	National A.C., Philadelphia, Pennsylvania, US	
101	Win	67–7–23 (4)	Jim Barry	KO	16 (25)	Apr 14, 1910	24 years, 41 days	Arena, Vernon, California, US	
100	Win	66–7–23 (4)	Fireman Jim Flynn	KO	8 (45)	Mar 17, 1910	24 years, 13 days	Jeffries' Arena, Vernon, California, US	Footage of this fight exists
99	Win	65–7–23 (4)	Nat Dewey	TKO	1 (20), 1:50	Feb 22, 1910	23 years, 355 days	Turner Hall, Cheyenne, Wyoming, US	
98	Loss	64–7–23 (4)	Fireman Jim Flynn	NWS	10	Feb 8, 1910	23 years, 341 days	Naud Junction Pavilion, Los Angeles, California, US	
97	Win	64–6–23 (4)	Dixie Kid	KO	3 (8)	Jan 10, 1910	23 years, 312 days	Phoenix A.C., Memphis, Tennessee, US	Retained world colored heavyweight title claim
96	Win	63–6–23 (4)	Mike Schreck	TKO	1 (6)	Nov 23, 1909	23 years, 264 days	Old City Hall, Pittsburgh, Pennsylvania, US	
95	Win	62–6–23 (4)	Klondike Haynes	KO	2 (12), 1:35	Nov 2, 1909	23 years, 243 days	Armory, Boston, Massachusetts, US	Retained world colored heavyweight title claim
94	Win	61–6–23 (4)	Dixie Kid	RTD	5 (12)	Sep 28, 1909	23 years, 208 days	Armory, Boston, Massachusetts, US	Retained world colored heavyweight title claim
93	Win	60–6–23 (4)	Klondike Haynes	NWS	6	Jul 13, 1909	23 years, 131 days	Bijou Theater, Pittsburgh, Pennsylvania, US	Claimed vacant world colored heavyweight title
92	Win	59–6–23 (4)	William Hague	KO	4 (20), 1:59	May 24, 1909	23 years, 81 days	National Sporting Club, Covent Garden, London, England	Won inaugural NSC version of the world heavyweight title
91	Draw	58–6–23 (4)	Sandy Ferguson	PTS	12	Apr 27, 1909	23 years, 54 days	Armory A.A., Boston, Massachusetts, US	
90	Win	58–6–22 (4)	Al Kubiak	NWS	6	Apr 17, 1909	23 years, 44 days	National A.C., Philadelphia, Pennsylvania, US	
89	Draw	57–6–22 (4)	Jim Barry	NWS	10	Apr 14, 1909	23 years, 41 days	Chadwick Park, Albany, US	
88	Win	57–6–21 (4)	John Willie	KO	2 (6)	Apr 3, 1909	23 years, 30 days	National A.C., Philadelphia, Pennsylvania, US	
87	Win	56–6–21 (4)	Morris Harris	TKO	7 (10)	Mar 29, 1909	23 years, 25 days	Marathon A.C., New York City, New York, US	
86	Win	55–6–21 (4)	Jim Barry	NWS	6	Mar 17, 1909	23 years, 13 days	Washington S.C., Philadelphia, Pennsylvania, US	
85	Win	54–6–21 (4)	Fireman Jim Flynn	KO	1 (20), 2:14	Dec 21, 1908	22 years, 292 days	Coliseum, San Francisco, California, US	
84	Draw	53–6–21 (4)	Joe Jennette	NWS	6	Sep 1, 1908	22 years, 181 days	National A.C., New York City, New York, US	
83	Win	53–6–20 (4)	Tony Ross	TKO	5 (6)	Aug 7, 1908	22 years, 156 days	Fairmont A.C., New York City, New York, US	
82	Win	52–6–20 (4)	John Willie	KO	2 (10)	Jul 21, 1908	22 years, 139 days	Navarre A.C., New York City, New York, US	
81	Win	51–6–20 (4)	Jim Barry	KO	3 (6)	Jun 19, 1908	22 years, 107 days	Fairmont A.C., New York City, New York, US	
80	Win	50–6–20 (4)	Sandy Ferguson	PTS	12	May 19, 1908	22 years, 76 days	Roanoke A.C., Boston, Massachusetts, US	
79	Win	49–6–20 (4)	Jim Barry	KO	2 (12)	Apr 7, 1908	22 years, 34 days	Roanoke A.C., Boston, Massachusetts, US	
78	Win	48–6–20 (4)	Larry Temple	PTS	8	Mar 11, 1908	22 years, 7 days	Roanoke A.C., Boston, Massachusetts, US	
77	Draw	47–6–20 (4)	Joe Jennette	PTS	12	Mar 3, 1908	21 years, 365 days	Armory, Boston, Massachusetts, US	
76	Win	47–6–19 (4)	Black Fitzsimmons	TKO	4 (6)	Feb 10, 1908	21 years, 343 days	Roanoke A.C., Boston, Massachusetts, US	
75	Draw	46–6–19 (4)	Jim Barry	NWS	10	Jan 14, 1908	21 years, 316 days	Pacific A.C., Los Angeles, California, US	
74	Win	46–6–18 (4)	Jim Barry	PTS	10	Dec 17, 1907	21 years, 288 days	Naud Junction Pavilion, Los Angeles, California, US	
73	Win	45–6–18 (4)	Young Peter Jackson	PTS	20	Nov 12, 1907	21 years, 253 days	Pacific A.C., Los Angeles, California, US	Won vacant world colored middleweight title
72	Win	44–6–18 (4)	Jim Barry	NWS	10	Oct 15, 1907	21 years, 225 days	Winnisimmet A.C., Chelsea, Massachusetts, US	
71	Win	43–6–18 (4)	Jim Barry	NWS	6	Sep 25, 1907	21 years, 205 days	Sharkey A.C., New York City, New York, US	
70	Win	42–6–18 (4)	Larry Temple	NWS	10	Aug 27, 1907	21 years, 176 days	Winnisimmet A.C., Chelsea, Massachusetts, US	Vacant world colored middleweight title at stake (via KO only)
69	Win	41–6–18 (4)	Geoff Thorne	KO	1 (10)	Jun 3, 1907	21 years, 91 days	National Sporting Club, Covent Garden, London, England	
68	Win	40–6–18 (4)	Tiger Smith	KO	4 (20), 0:57	Apr 22, 1907	21 years, 49 days	National Sporting Club, Covent Garden, London, England	Won vacant NSC British and Commonwealth middleweight titles
67	Win	39–6–18 (4)	Kid Williams	KO	6 (?)	Jan 31, 1907	20 years, 333 days	Rochester, New York, US	
66	Draw	38–6–18 (4)	Joe Jennette	PTS	12	Jan 11, 1907	20 years, 313 days	Unity Cycle Club, Lawrence, Massachusetts, US	
65	Win	38–6–17 (4)	George Gunther	TKO	3 (?)	Nov 29, 1906	20 years, 270 days	Haverhill, Massachusetts, US	
64	Win	37–6–17 (4)	Young Peter Jackson	PTS	15	Nov 21, 1906	20 years, 262 days	Rochester, New York, US	
63	Win	36–6–17 (4)	George Gunther	PTS	12	Nov 12, 1906	20 years, 253 days	Valley Falls A.C., Valley Falls, Rhode Island, US	
62	Loss	35–6–17 (4)	Young Peter Jackson	TKO	5 (?)	Jun 13, 1906	20 years, 101 days	Southbridge, Massachusetts, Massachusetts, US	
61	Loss	35–5–17 (4)	Jack Johnson	PTS	15	Apr 26, 1906	20 years, 53 days	Lincoln A.C., Chelsea, Massachusetts, US	For world colored heavyweight title
60	Win	35–4–17 (4)	Joe Jennette	PTS	15	Apr 5, 1906	20 years, 32 days	Lincoln A.C., Chelsea, Massachusetts, US	
59	Win	34–4–17 (4)	Black Fitzsimmons	TKO	11 (?)	Mar 19, 1906	20 years, 15 days	Lakeside A.C., Webster, Massachusetts, US	
58	Win	33–4–17 (4)	Larry Temple	KO	15 (15), 2:20	Mar 1, 1906	19 years, 362 days	Lincoln A.C., Chelsea, Massachusetts, US	
57	Loss	32–4–17 (4)	Joe Jennette	TKO	8 (12)	Dec 25, 1905	19 years, 296 days	Unity Cycle Club, Lawrence, Massachusetts, US	Langford retired after round 8.
56	NC	32–3–17 (4)	Jack Blackburn	NC	1 (6)	Oct 7, 1905	19 years, 217 days	National A.C., Philadelphia, Pennsylvania, US	It was quickly evident that Langford and Blackburn agreed to participate only if the fight was faked, so it was stopped.
55	Draw	32–3–17 (3)	Young Peter Jackson	PTS	15	Sep 29, 1905	19 years, 209 days	Germania Maennerchor Hall, Baltimore, Maryland, US	
54	Draw	32–3–16 (3)	Jack Blackburn	PTS	10	Sep 20, 1905	19 years, 200 days	Lyric A.C., Allentown, Pennsylvania, US	
53	Draw	32–3–15 (3)	Larry Temple	PTS	15	Sep 7, 1905	19 years, 187 days	Highland A.C., Marlborough, Massachusetts, US	
52	Win	32–3–14 (3)	Jack Blackburn	PTS	15	Aug 18, 1905	19 years, 167 days	Leiperville, Pennsylvania, US	
51	Loss	31–3–14 (3)	Larry Temple	PTS	15	Jul 4, 1905	19 years, 122 days	Marlborough, Massachusetts, US	
50	Win	31–2–14 (3)	Young Peter Jackson	PTS	15	Jun 16, 1905	19 years, 104 days	Douglas A.C., Chelsea, Massachusetts, US	
49	Win	30–2–14 (3)	Young Peter Jackson	PTS	15	May 26, 1905	19 years, 83 days	Highland A.C., Marlborough, Massachusetts, US	
48	Win	29–2–14 (3)	Bogardus Hyde	TKO	3 (15)	May 16, 1905	19 years, 73 days	Music Hall, Webster, Massachusetts, US	
47	Win	28–2–14 (3)	George Gunther	PTS	12	Mar 13, 1905	19 years, 9 days	Auditorium, Portland, Maine, US	
46	NC	27–2–14 (3)	George Cole	NC	9 (15)	Mar 3, 1905	18 years, 364 days	Chelsea, Massachusetts, US	The fight was called "no contest" because of a lack of action.
45	Win	27–2–14 (2)	Dave Holly	NWS	15	Feb 13, 1905	18 years, 346 days	Apollo A.C., Salem, Massachusetts, US	
44	Win	26–2–14 (2)	George Gunther	TKO	11 (?)	Jan 20, 1905	18 years, 322 days	Douglas A.C., Chelsea, Massachusetts, US	
43	Win	25–2–14 (2)	Joe Reed	KO	5 (12)	Jan 16, 1905	18 years, 318 days	Music Hall, Webster, Massachusetts, US	
42	Win	24–2–14 (2)	Joe Reed	TKO	9 (?)	Dec 22, 1904	18 years, 293 days	Paper City A.C., Berlin, New Hampshire, US	
41	Draw	23–2–14 (2)	Jack Blackburn	PTS	15	Dec 9, 1904	18 years, 280 days	Marlborough Theater, Marlborough, Massachusetts, US	
40	Win	23–2–13 (2)	Tommy Sullivan	TKO	3 (12)	Nov 25, 1904	18 years, 266 days	Highland A.C., Marlborough, Massachusetts, US	
39	Win	22–2–13 (2)	Andy Watson	NWS	12	Nov 24, 1904	18 years, 265 days	Music Hall, Webster, Massachusetts, US	
38	Draw	21–2–13 (2)	Dave Holly	NWS	6	Nov 4, 1904	18 years, 245 days	Manhattan A.C., Philadelphia, Pennsylvania, US	
37	Draw	21–2–12 (2)	Dave Holly	PTS	15	Sep 30, 1904	18 years, 210 days	Eureka A.C., Baltimore, Maryland, US	
36	Draw	21–2–11 (2)	Barbados Joe Walcott	PTS	15	Sep 5, 1904	18 years, 185 days	Lake Massabesic Coliseum, Manchester, New Hampshire, US	For world welterweight title
35	Win	21–2–10 (2)	George 'Elbows' McFadden	TKO	2 (15)	Jul 29, 1904	18 years, 147 days	Manchester, New Hampshire, US	
34	Loss	20–2–10 (2)	Dave Holly	PTS	10	Apr 11, 1904	18 years, 38 days	Cambridge A.A., Cambridge, Massachusetts, US	
33	Win	20–1–10 (2)	Willie Lewis	KO	2 (12)	Feb 22, 1904	17 years, 355 days	Warren A.C., New Bedford, Massachusetts, US	
32	Win	19–1–10 (2)	Charles Johnson	TKO	5 (?)	Feb 13, 1904	17 years, 346 days	Central A.C., Boston, Massachusetts, US	
31	Win	18–1–10 (2)	Belfield Walcott	NWS	6	Jan 27, 1904	17 years, 329 days	Central A.C., Boston, Massachusetts, US	
30	Draw	17–1–10 (2)	Jack Blackburn	NWS	6	Jan 11, 1904	17 years, 313 days	Washington S.C., Philadelphia, Pennsylvania, US	
29	Draw	17–1–9 (2)	Andy Watson	PTS	12	Jan 6, 1904	17 years, 308 days	North Street Rink, Salem, Massachusetts, US	
28	Draw	17–1–8 (2)	Jack Blackburn	PTS	12	Dec 23, 1903	17 years, 294 days	Central A.C., Boston, Massachusetts, US	
27	Win	17–1–7 (2)	Joe Gans	PTS	15	Dec 8, 1903	17 years, 279 days	Criterion A.C., Boston, Massachusetts, US	
26	Win	16–1–7 (2)	Joe Reed	DQ	4 (?)	Nov 28, 1903	17 years, 269 days	Central A.C., Boston, Massachusetts, US	Reed threw Langford and was disqualified.
25	Win	15–1–7 (2)	Patsy Sweeney	KO	12 (12), 2:38	Nov 20, 1903	17 years, 261 days	Lenox A.C., Boston, Massachusetts, US	
24	Win	14–1–7 (2)	Arthur Cote	TKO	5 (12)	Oct 5, 1903	17 years, 215 days	American A.C., Boston, Massachusetts, US	
23	Win	13–1–7 (2)	Shadow Morris	PTS	12	Sep 15, 1903	17 years, 195 days	Central A.C., Boston, Massachusetts, US	
22	Win	12–1–7 (2)	Kid Griffo	PTS	12	Aug 28, 1903	17 years, 177 days	Lenox A.C., Boston, Massachusetts, US	
21	Win	11–1–7 (2)	Belfield Walcott	PTS	20	Jul 16, 1903	17 years, 134 days	Saundersville Athletic Club, Scituate, Rhode Island, US	
20	Loss	10–1–7 (2)	Danny Duane	PTS	12	Jun 26, 1903	17 years, 114 days	Lenox A.C., Boston, Massachusetts, US	
19	Win	10–0–7 (2)	Walter Burgo	TKO	8 (?)	Jun 19, 1903	17 years, 107 days	Lenox A.C., Boston, Massachusetts, US	
18	Draw	9–0–7 (2)	Andy Watson	PTS	12	Jun 15, 1903	17 years, 103 days	Gloucester A.C., Gloucester, Massachusetts, US	
17	Win	9–0–6 (2)	Tim Kearns	TKO	2 (12)	Jun 5, 1903	17 years, 93 days	Lenox A.C., Boston, Massachusetts, US	Kearns quit with an arm injury.
16	Draw	8–0–6 (2)	Andy Watson	PTS	12	May 29, 1903	17 years, 86 days	Lenox A.C., Boston, Massachusetts, US	
15	Win	8–0–5 (2)	Chick Monahan	KO	1 (10)	May 26, 1903	17 years, 83 days	Criterion A.C., Boston, Massachusetts, US	
14	Win	7–0–5 (2)	Billy Jordan	PTS	6	May 25, 1903	17 years, 82 days	Cambridge Athletic Club, Boston, Massachusetts, US	
13	Draw	6–0–5 (2)	Andy Watson	PTS	10	May 8, 1903	17 years, 65 days	Lenox A.C., Boston, Massachusetts, US	Pre-arranged draw if lasting the distance
12	ND	6–0–4 (2)	Andy Watson	ND	12	Apr 20, 1903	17 years, 47 days	West End A.C., Lawrence, Massachusetts, US	
11	Win	6–0–4 (1)	Stonewall Allen	PTS	6	Apr 16, 1903	17 years, 43 days	Essex A.C., Boston, Massachusetts, US	
10	Draw	5–0–4 (1)	Stonewall Allen	PTS	6	Apr 3, 1903	17 years, 30 days	Lenox A.C., Boston, Massachusetts, US	
9	Win	5–0–3 (1)	John E. Butler	PTS	6	Mar 26, 1903	17 years, 22 days	Essex A.C., Boston, Massachusetts, US	
8	Draw	4–0–3 (1)	Johnny Johnson	PTS	6	Mar 5, 1903	17 years, 1 day	Essex A.C., Boston, Massachusetts, US	
7	Win	4–0–2 (1)	Sadler Jennings	KO	2 (6)	Mar 4, 1903	17 years, 0 days	Highland Athletic Club, Chelsea, Massachusetts, US	
6	Win	3–0–2 (1)	Luther Manual	PTS	10	Feb 27, 1903	16 years, 360 days	Lenox A.C., Boston, Massachusetts, US	
5	Draw	2–0–2 (1)	Luther Manual	PTS	6	Feb 6, 1903	16 years, 339 days	Lenox A.C., Boston, Massachusetts, US	
4	Draw	2–0–1 (1)	Luther Manual	PTS	4	Jan 23, 1903	16 years, 325 days	Essex A.C., Boston, Massachusetts, US	
3	ND	2–0 (1)	Billy Chisholm	ND	6	Jan 22, 1903	16 years, 324 days	Lawrence, Massachusetts, US	
2	Win	2–0	Arthur Pratt	KO	1 (6)	Jan 15, 1903	16 years, 317 days	Essex A.C., Boston, Massachusetts, US	
1	Win	1–0	Jack McVicker	KO	5 (6)	Apr 11, 1902	16 years, 38 days	Lenox A.C., Boston, Massachusetts, US	

Titles in pretence
Vacant Title last held by Tom Sharkey	World Heavyweight Champion; NSC recognition May 24, 1909	Vacant Title next held by George Godfrey
Preceded by Joe Jeanette	World Colored Heavyweight Champion; September 6, 1909 – December 26, 1911	Succeeded by Sam McVea
Preceded by Sam McVea	World Colored Heavyweight Champion; April 8, 1912 – May 1, 1914	Succeeded by Harry Wills
Preceded by Harry Wills	World Colored Heavyweight Champion; November 26, 1914 – January 3, 1916	Succeeded by Harry Wills
Preceded by Harry Wills	World Colored Heavyweight Champion; February 11, 1916 – January 25, 1917	Succeeded by Bill Tate
Preceded by Bill Tate	World Colored Heavyweight Champion; May 2, 1917 – April 14, 1918	Succeeded by Harry Wills
