= William Lankford =

William Lankford may refer to:

- William C. Lankford (1877–1964), American politician
- Hasaan Ibn Ali (musician) (1931–1980), jazz pianist, whose birth name may have been William Henry Lankford
