= Kevin Hartford =

Canadian film director

Kevin Hartford is a Canadian film director from Halifax, Nova Scotia, whose debut feature film Lemon Squeezy was released in 2022.

Hartford began making short films in 2016, with his film Breakout receiving a Screen Nova Scotia award nomination for Best Short Film in 2022.

He made Lemon Squeezy, a comedy film about a gay teenager who fears he may have triggered the apocalypse when he turns to religion after being rejected for a date, as an independent microbudget film after having difficulty securing production funding. The film debuted at the 2022 Austin Gay and Lesbian Film Festival, and had its Canadian premiere at the Atlantic Film Festival. The film was a nominee for Best Picture at the 2023 Screen Nova Scotia Awards.

He returned to the 2023 Atlantic International Film Festival with Slay, a short film which he says he made without ever realizing that the character's sexual orientation never actually comes up in dialogue. According to Hartford, "hopefully, this is a sign that we’ve advanced enough as a society that even I, as a gay filmmaker, very intentionally making a gay short, unwittingly considered the character’s orientation so irrelevant to just telling a good story that I neglected even to bring it up onscreen."

His second feature film, To the Moon, premiered at the 2024 Atlantic International Film Festival.

== Filmography ==
- Charlie's P.O.C. - 2016
- Wait for Rescue - 2016
- I Love You More - 2017
- Dorothy - 2018
- My Mother's Armenian Christmas Bread Recipe - 2018
- You Too, Chuckles - 2019
- Le Balcon - 2020
- Disco Apocalypse - 2020
- Breakout - 2021
- The Dog Owner - 2021
- Lemon Squeezy - 2022
- There's a Giant Baby on the Roof - 2022
- Slay - 2023
- To the Moon - 2024
