= Jim Johnson (boxer) =

American boxer (1887–1918)

James Johnson
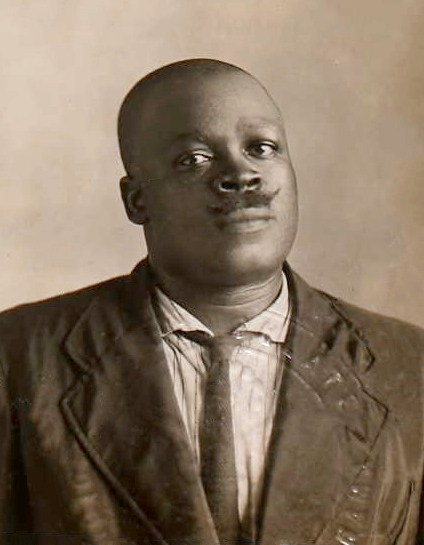
- Johnson in 1918

Personal information
- Nickname: Battling Jim
- Born: September 2, 1887 Danville, Virginia, U.S.
- Died: November 6, 1918 (aged 31) Boston, Massachusetts, U.S.
- Height: 5 ft 11 in (1.80 m)

Boxing career

Boxing record
- Total fights: 84
- Wins: 35
- Win by KO: 23
- Losses: 35
- Draws: 13
- No contests: 1

"Battling" Jim Johnson (September 2, 1887 – November 1, 1918) was an American boxer who fought as a heavyweight from 1908 to 1918. He had little success and lost with great frequency to top boxers such as Sam Langford, Joe Jeanette, Sam McVey, Harry Wills and Kid Norfolk.

In spite of this, Jack Johnson, the first black world heavyweight champion, gave him a title shot. When they fought in Paris in August 1913, it was the first time that two black boxers had fought for the world heavyweight title. Battling Jim was the only black fighter Johnson faced during his reign as heavyweight champ from 1908 to 1915.

== Title Shot ==
Battling Jim fought former colored champ Joe Jeanette four times between 19 July 1912 and 21 January 1912 and lost all four fights. The only fighter of note he did beat in that period was future colored champ Big Bill Tate, whom he K.O.-ed in the second round of a scheduled 10-round bout. It was Tate's third pro fight.

In November 1913, the International Boxing Union declared the world heavyweight title held by Jack Johnson to be vacant. The heavyweight title fight between the two Johnsons, scheduled for 10 rounds, was held on 19 December 1913 in Paris. It was the first time in history that two blacks fought for the world heavyweight championship.

== Johnson v. Johnson ==
While the Johnson v. Johnson fight had been billed as a world heavyweight title match, in many ways, it resembled an exhibition. A sportswriter from the Indianapolis Star reported that the fight crowd became unruly when it was apparent that neither boxer was putting up a fight.

"Jack Johnson, the heavyweight champion, and Battling Jim Johnson, another colored pugilist, of Galveston, Texas, met in a 10-round contest here tonight, which ended in a draw. The spectators loudly protested throughout that the men were not fighting, and demanded their money back. Many of them left the hall. The organizers of the fight explained the fiasco by asserting that Jack Johnson's left arm was broken in the third round. There is no confirmation of a report that Jack Johnson had been stabbed and no evidence at the ringside of such an accident. During the first three rounds he was obviously playing with his opponent. After that it was observed that he was only using his right hand. When the fight was over he complained that his arm had been injured. Doctors who made an examination, certified to a slight fracture of the radius of the left arm. The general opinion is that his arm was injured in a wrestling match early in the week, and that a blow tonight caused the fracture of the bone."

Because of the draw, Jack Johnson kept his championship. After the fight, he explained that his left arm was injured in the third round and he could not use it.

== Later career ==
Battling Jim's next fight, four months later, also was a title match. On 27 March 1914 in New York City, Sam Langford won a newspaper decision in a ten-rounder with Johnson. According to the New York Times, the colored heavyweight champ "won by a wide margin" because Johnson "failed to show anything remotely resembling championship ability."

Battling Jim fought Langford ten more times (including two more colored title matches). Two of the fights were draws, including their last fight on 22 September 1918, which was also Battling Jim's last pro bout. He faced Joe Jeanette five more times and did not win a single contest. Two of their fights were draws and their last fight on 20 August 1918, Battling Jim's penultimate pro fight, was a no decision.

Of the other colored heavyweight champs that Battling Jim battled, he won only one fight, against Harry Wills, because he broke his wrist blocking a punch in a non-title match and Johnson won by a technical knockout. Battling Jim lost his other two fights with Wills and lost the five fights he had with ex-colored heavyweight champ Sam McVey in the post-Jack Johnson title shot period.

== Illness and death ==
Jim was signed to fight Sam Langford in a 12-round fight at the Crescent Athletic Club in Lowell, Massachusetts. However, the fight was postponed due to the 1918 Spanish influenza pandemic. While waiting for the bout to be rescheduled, Johnson contracted the disease. After he was removed from the hospital, he died after a few days of pneumonia.

== Record and legacy ==
Battling Jim ended with a career record of 30 wins against 31 losses and six draws when his newspaper decisions are factored in. Looking at his dismal performance with the top black heavyweights of his era and his inability to best a one-armed Jack Johnson, Battling Jim Johnson cannot be considered a top contender of his era or a worthy opponent when Jack Johnson awarded him the sole title shot given to a black boxer in the 29 years between Jack and Joe Louis winning the heavyweight crown.

== Professional boxing record ==
All information in this section is derived from BoxRec, unless otherwise stated.

=== Official record ===
84 fights	27 wins	18 losses
By knockout	23	4
By decision	4	10
By disqualification	0	4
Draws	7	
No contests	1	
Newspaper decisions/draws	31	

All newspaper decisions are officially regarded as “no decision” bouts and are not counted in the win/loss/draw column.

No.	Result	Record	Opponent	Type	Round	Date	Location	Notes
84	Loss	27–18–7 (32)	Joe Jeanette	PTS	?	Aug 27, 1918	Wiedenmayer Park, Jersey City, New Jersey, U.S.	
83	Loss	27–17–7 (32)	Sam Langford	NWS	8	Aug 22, 1918	Lafayette A.C., Saint Louis, Missouri, U.S.	
82	Loss	27–17–7 (31)	Sam Langford	NWS	8	Aug 5, 1918	Atlantic City S.C., Atlantic City, New Jersey, U.S.	
81	Loss	27–17–7 (30)	Kid Norfolk	NWS	4	Jul 16, 1918	Madison Square Garden, Manhattan, New York City, New York, U.S.	
80	Loss	27–17–7 (29)	Sam Langford	PTS	10	Jun 19, 1918	Auditorium, Atlanta, Georgia, U.S.	
79	Loss	27–16–7 (29)	Sam McVey	PTS	25	Oct 14, 1917	Broadway Theater, Colon City, Panama	
78	Win	27–15–7 (29)	Jeff Clark	TKO	8 (15)	Sep 16, 1917	Broadway Theater, Colon City, Panama	
77	Loss	26–15–7 (29)	Sam McVey	PTS	20	Aug 12, 1917	Plaza de Toros Vista Alegre, Panama City, Panama	
76	Loss	26–14–7 (29)	Tango Kid	DQ	8 (10)	Jun 29, 1917	Vanderbilt A.C., Brooklyn, New York City, New York, U.S.	
75	Loss	26–13–7 (29)	Harry Wills	NWS	10	Jun 1, 1917	Harlem S.C., Manhattan, New York City, New York, U.S.	
74	Win	26–13–7 (28)	Harry Wills	TKO	2 (12)	Feb 7, 1917	Future City A.C., Saint Louis, Missouri, U.S.	
73	Loss	25–13–7 (28)	Sam Langford	PTS	12	Jan 1, 1917	Academy A.C., Kansas City, Missouri, U.S.	For world colored heavyweight title claim
72	Loss	25–12–7 (28)	Sam Langford	KO	12 (12)	Dec 12, 1916	Future City A.C., Saint Louis, Missouri, U.S.	For world colored heavyweight title claim
71	Win	25–11–7 (28)	Lowe Simms	KO	5 (10)	Sep 15, 1916	Idaho, Boise, U.S.	
70	Loss	24–11–7 (28)	Joe Bonds	PTS	10	Aug 1, 1916	Idaho, Boise, U.S.	
69	Win	24–10–7 (28)	Jack Thompson	KO	3 (20)	May 18, 1916	Elks Opera House, Leadville, Colorado, U.S.	
68	Win	23–10–7 (28)	Kyle Whitney	KO	2 (20)	Apr 13, 1916	Elks Opera House, Leadville, Colorado, U.S.	
67	Draw	22–10–7 (28)	Jack Thompson	PTS	10	Dec 3, 1915	North Side A.C., Kansas City, Missouri, U.S.	
66	Draw	22–10–6 (28)	Jeff Clark	PTS	15	Nov 1, 1915	Joplin, Missouri, U.S.	
65	Loss	22–10–5 (28)	Sam Langford	PTS	15	Oct 18, 1915	National A.C., Denver, Colorado, U.S.	
64	Loss	22–9–5 (28)	Andre Anderson	TKO	9 (10)	Oct 4, 1915	St. Nicholas Arena, Manhattan, New York City, New York, U.S.	
63	Draw	22–8–5 (28)	Soldier Kearns	NWS	10	Sep 21, 1915	Brooklyn, New York City, New York, U.S.	
62	Loss	22–8–5 (27)	Harry Wills	NWS	10	Jul 5, 1915	Sacandaga Park, Gloversville, New York, U.S.	
61	Loss	22–8–5 (26)	Sam McVey	NWS	10	Jun 9, 1915	Gayety Theatre, Montreal, Quebec, Canada	
60	Loss	22–8–5 (25)	Sam Langford	NWS	10	Jun 8, 1915	Broadway S.C., Brooklyn, New York City, New York, U.S.	
59	Win	22–8–5 (24)	Joe Jeanette	NWS	10	May 10, 1915	Sohmer Park, Montreal, Quebec, Canada	
58	Draw	22–8–5 (23)	Joe Battling Woods	NWS	10 (?)	May 3, 1915	Broadway S.C., Brooklyn, New York City, New York, U.S.	
57	Win	22–8–5 (22)	Arthur Pelkey	KO	7 (10)	Apr 30, 1915	Sohmer Park, Montreal, Quebec, Canada	
56	Loss	21–8–5 (22)	Sam Langford	NWS	10	Apr 6, 1915	135th Street A.C., Manhattan, New York City, New York, U.S.	World colored heavyweight title claim at stake; (via KO only)
55	Loss	21–8–5 (21)	Sam McVey	PTS	20	Feb 20, 1915	Havana, Cuba	
54	Win	21–7–5 (21)	Fred Jackson	TKO	4 (10)	Jan 11, 1915	Pioneer Sporting Club, Manhattan, New York City, New York, U.S.	
53	Loss	20–7–5 (21)	Sam McVey	NWS	10	Dec 10, 1914	Fairmont A.C., Bronx, New York City, New York, U.S.	
52	Draw	20–7–5 (20)	Joe Jeanette	PTS	12	Nov 10, 1914	Atlas A.A., Boston, Massachusetts, U.S.	
51	Draw	20–7–4 (20)	Sam Langford	PTS	12	Sep 15, 1914	Atlas A.A., Boston, Massachusetts, U.S.	For world colored heavyweight title claim
50	Loss	20–7–3 (20)	Sam Langford	NWS	10	Aug 12, 1914	Stadium A.C., Manhattan, New York City, New York, U.S.	World colored heavyweight title claim at stake; (via KO only)
49	Loss	20–7–3 (19)	Joe Jeanette	NWS	10	Aug 5, 1914	Stadium A.C., Manhattan, New York City, New York, U.S.	
48	Loss	20–7–3 (18)	Joe Jeanette	NWS	10	Jul 15, 1914	St. Nicholas Arena, Manhattan, New York City, New York, U.S.	
47	Loss	20–7–3 (17)	Joe Jeanette	NWS	10	Jul 1, 1914	St. Nicholas Arena, Manhattan, New York City, New York, U.S.	
46	Loss	20–7–3 (16)	Porky Dan Flynn	PTS	12	May 19, 1914	Atlas A.A., Boston, Massachusetts, U.S.	
45	Loss	20–6–3 (16)	Sam Langford	NWS	10	Mar 27, 1914	Empire A.C., Manhattan, New York City, New York, U.S.	
44	Draw	20–6–3 (15)	Jack Johnson	PTS	10	Dec 19, 1913	Élysée Montmartre, Paris, Paris, France	For world heavyweight title
43	Win	20–6–2 (15)	Jim Esson	KO	1 (?)	Jun 22, 1913	Américan-Park, Bordeaux, Gironde, France	
42	NC	19–6–2 (15)	Kid Jackson	NC	?	May 29, 1913	Apollo Saint-Michel, Avignon, Vaucluse, France	
41	Win	19–6–2 (14)	Bob Scanlon	TKO	6 (20)	May 26, 1913	The Ring, Blackfriars Road, Southwark, London, England, U.K.	
40	Win	18–6–2 (14)	Kid Jackson	TKO	10 (?)	May 3, 1913	Eldorado-Casino, Marseille, Bouches-du-Rhône, France	
39	Win	17–6–2 (14)	Gustave Marthuin	TKO	8 (20)	Apr 28, 1913	The Ring, Blackfriars Road, Southwark, London, England, U.K.	
38	Win	16–6–2 (14)	Con O'Kelly	KO	11 (15)	Apr 3, 1913	Liverpool Stadium, Pudsey Street, Liverpool, Merseyside, England, U.K.	
37	Loss	15–6–2 (14)	Joe Jeanette	DQ	15 (?)	Jan 21, 1913	Providence, Rhode Island, U.S.	
36	Win	15–5–2 (14)	Tom Overby	KO	6 (10)	Jan 16, 1913	Keystone A.C., Allentown, Pennsylvania, U.S.	
35	Loss	14–5–2 (14)	Joe Jeanette	NWS	10	Jan 1, 1913	Irving A.C., Brooklyn, New York City, New York, U.S.	
34	Win	14–5–2 (13)	Bill Tate	KO	2 (10)	Dec 1, 1912	Sharkey A.C., Manhattan, New York City, New York, U.S.	
33	Win	13–5–2 (13)	Tom Overby	NWS	6	Nov 26, 1912	Spring Garden A.C., Philadelphia, Pennsylvania, U.S.	
32	Win	13–5–2 (12)	Black Bill	KO	7 (10)	Nov 12, 1912	Royale A.C., Brooklyn, New York City, New York, U.S.	
31	Loss	12–5–2 (12)	Joe Jeanette	NWS	10	Oct 30, 1912	Forty-Fourth Street A.C., Manhattan, New York City, New York, U.S.	
30	Win	12–5–2 (11)	Bill Watkins	KO	2 (5)	Sep 30, 1912	American A.C., Philadelphia, Pennsylvania, U.S.	
29	Win	11–5–2 (11)	Joe Jeanette	NWS	6	Jul 19, 1912	Olympia A.C., Philadelphia, Pennsylvania, U.S.	
28	Win	11–5–2 (10)	Chuck Carleton	NWS	6	May 20, 1912	American A.C., Philadelphia, Pennsylvania, U.S.	
27	Loss	11–5–2 (9)	Fred Storbeck	PTS	20	Apr 4, 1912	Liverpool Stadium, Pudsey Street, Liverpool, Merseyside, England, U.K.	
26	Win	11–4–2 (9)	Tom Cowler	PTS	15	Mar 30, 1912	The Ring, Blackfriars Road, Southwark, London, England, U.K.	
25	Loss	10–4–2 (9)	Alf Langford	DQ	3 (20)	Jan 29, 1912	The Ring, Blackfriars Road, Southwark, London, England, U.K.	Johnson hit Langford when he was down
24	Win	10–3–2 (9)	Dennis Haugh	KO	3 (?)	Dec 8, 1911	Cosmopolitan Gymnasium, Plymouth, Devon, England, U.K.	
23	Loss	9–3–2 (9)	Matthew Curran	DQ	4 (20)	Dec 1, 1911	Cosmopolitan Gymnasium, Plymouth, Devon, England, U.K.	
22	Loss	9–2–2 (9)	Alf Langford	KO	4 (20)	May 22, 1911	Attercliffe Boxing Hall, Sheffield, Yorkshire, England, U.K.	
21	Win	9–1–2 (9)	Seaman George Pascall	KO	6 (10)	Feb 20, 1911	The Empire, Holborn, London, England, U.K.	
20	Win	8–1–2 (9)	Jewey Smith	TKO	11 (20)	Jan 23, 1911	Wonderland, Whitechapel Road, Mile End, London, England, U.K.	
19	Win	7–1–2 (9)	Fred Drummond	TKO	4 (10)	Jan 7, 1911	Wonderland, Whitechapel Road, Mile End, London, England, U.K.	
18	Loss	6–1–2 (9)	Sam McVey	KO	21 (25)	Nov 19, 1910	Luna Park Skating Rink, Paris, Paris, France	
17	Win	6–0–2 (9)	Gustave Marthuin	PTS	10	Oct 9, 1910	Wonderland, Paris, Paris, France	
16	Win	5–0–2 (9)	Jim Maher	KO	3 (10)	Sep 1, 1910	Hippodrome, Paris, Paris, France	
15	Win	4–0–2 (9)	Alexandre Meunier	KO	5 (10)	Aug 19, 1910	Hippodrome-Théâtre, Roubaix, Nord, France	
14	Draw	3–0–2 (9)	Sam McVey	PTS	15	Aug 7, 1910	Neuilly-sur-Seine, Hauts-de-Seine, France	
13	Draw	3–0–1 (9)	Tom Overby	NWS	6	May 31, 1910	Douglas A.C., Philadelphia, Pennsylvania, U.S.	
12	Win	3–0–1 (8)	Morris Harris	NWS	6	May 23, 1910	Willis A.C., Philadelphia, Pennsylvania, U.S.	
11	Loss	3–0–1 (7)	Sam Langford	NWS	6	May 14, 1910	National A.C., Philadelphia, Pennsylvania, U.S.	World colored heavyweight title claim at stake; (via KO only)
10	Draw	3–0–1 (6)	Tony Ross	NWS	6	Apr 19, 1910	Douglas A.C., Philadelphia, Pennsylvania, U.S.	
9	draw	3–0–1 (5)	Tom Overby	PTS	10	Apr 14, 1910	Keystone A.C., Allentown, Pennsylvania, U.S.	
8	Draw	3–0 (5)	Al Kubiak	NWS	6	Mar 29, 1910	Douglas A.C., Philadelphia, Pennsylvania, U.S.	
7	Win	3–0 (4)	Charley Stevenson	NWS	6	Mar 14, 1910	West End A.C., Philadelphia, Pennsylvania, U.S.	
6	Win	3–0 (3)	Tom Overby	NWS	6	Mar 5, 1910	National A.C., Philadelphia, Pennsylvania, U.S.	
5	Win	3–0 (2)	Tom Overby	NWS	6	Feb 19, 1910	Wilkes-Barre, Pennsylvania, U.S.	
4	Loss	3–0 (1)	Jeff Clark	NWS	6	Feb 14, 1910	West End A.C., Philadelphia, Pennsylvania, U.S.	
3	Win	3–0	George Kid Cotton	PTS	8	Jan 17, 1910	Phoenix A.C., Memphis, Tennessee, U.S.	
2	Win	2–0	Battling Harris	PTS	8	Jan 3, 1910	Phoenix A.C., Memphis, Tennessee, U.S.	
1	Win	1–0	Battling Brooks	TKO	4 (6)	Mar 26, 1909	Lyric Theatre, Binghamton, New York, U.S.	

=== Unofficial record ===
84 fights	35 wins	36 losses
By knockout	23	4
By decision	12	28
By disqualification	0	4
Draws	12	
No contests	1	

Record with the inclusion of newspaper decisions in the win/loss/draw column.

No.	Result	Record	Opponent	Type	Round	Date	Location	Notes
84	Loss	35–35–13 (1)	Joe Jeanette	PTS	?	Aug 27, 1918	Wiedenmayer Park, Jersey City, New Jersey, U.S.	
83	Loss	35–34–13 (1)	Sam Langford	NWS	8	Aug 22, 1918	Lafayette A.C., Saint Louis, Missouri, U.S.	
82	Loss	35–33–13 (1)	Sam Langford	NWS	8	Aug 5, 1918	Atlantic City S.C., Atlantic City, New Jersey, U.S.	
81	Loss	35–32–13 (1)	Kid Norfolk	NWS	4	Jul 16, 1918	Madison Square Garden, Manhattan, New York City, New York, U.S.	
80	Loss	35–31–13 (1)	Sam Langford	PTS	10	Jun 19, 1918	Auditorium, Atlanta, Georgia, U.S.	
79	Loss	35–30–13 (1)	Sam McVey	PTS	25	Oct 14, 1917	Broadway Theater, Colon City, Panama	
78	Win	35–29–13 (1)	Jeff Clark	TKO	8 (15)	Sep 16, 1917	Broadway Theater, Colon City, Panama	
77	Loss	34–29–13 (1)	Sam McVey	PTS	20	Aug 12, 1917	Plaza de Toros Vista Alegre, Panama City, Panama	
76	Loss	34–28–13 (1)	Tango Kid	DQ	8 (10)	Jun 29, 1917	Vanderbilt A.C., Brooklyn, New York City, New York, U.S.	
75	Loss	34–27–13 (1)	Harry Wills	NWS	10	Jun 1, 1917	Harlem S.C., Manhattan, New York City, New York, U.S.	
74	Win	34–26–13 (1)	Harry Wills	TKO	2 (12)	Feb 7, 1917	Future City A.C., Saint Louis, Missouri, U.S.	
73	Loss	33–26–13 (1)	Sam Langford	PTS	12	Jan 1, 1917	Academy A.C., Kansas City, Missouri, U.S.	For world colored heavyweight title claim
72	Loss	33–25–13 (1)	Sam Langford	KO	12 (12)	Dec 12, 1916	Future City A.C., Saint Louis, Missouri, U.S.	For world colored heavyweight title claim
71	Win	33–24–13 (1)	Lowe Simms	KO	5 (10)	Sep 15, 1916	Idaho, Boise, U.S.	
70	Loss	32–24–13 (1)	Joe Bonds	PTS	10	Aug 1, 1916	Idaho, Boise, U.S.	
69	Win	32–23–13 (1)	Jack Thompson	KO	3 (20)	May 18, 1916	Elks Opera House, Leadville, Colorado, U.S.	
68	Win	31–23–13 (1)	Kyle Whitney	KO	2 (20)	Apr 13, 1916	Elks Opera House, Leadville, Colorado, U.S.	
67	Draw	30–23–13 (1)	Jack Thompson	PTS	10	Dec 3, 1915	North Side A.C., Kansas City, Missouri, U.S.	
66	Draw	30–23–12 (1)	Jeff Clark	PTS	15	Nov 1, 1915	Joplin, Missouri, U.S.	
65	Loss	30–23–11 (1)	Sam Langford	PTS	15	Oct 18, 1915	National A.C., Denver, Colorado, U.S.	
64	Loss	30–22–11 (1)	Andre Anderson	TKO	9 (10)	Oct 4, 1915	St. Nicholas Arena, Manhattan, New York City, New York, U.S.	
63	Draw	30–21–11 (1)	Soldier Kearns	NWS	10	Sep 21, 1915	Brooklyn, New York City, New York, U.S.	
62	Loss	30–21–10 (1)	Harry Wills	NWS	10	Jul 5, 1915	Sacandaga Park, Gloversville, New York, U.S.	
61	Loss	30–20–10 (1)	Sam McVey	NWS	10	Jun 9, 1915	Gayety Theatre, Montreal, Quebec, Canada	
60	Loss	30–20–9 (1)	Sam Langford	NWS	10	Jun 8, 1915	Broadway S.C., Brooklyn, New York City, New York, U.S.	
59	Win	30–19–9 (1)	Joe Jeanette	NWS	10	May 10, 1915	Sohmer Park, Montreal, Quebec, Canada	
58	Draw	29–19–9 (1)	Joe Battling Woods	NWS	10 (?)	May 3, 1915	Broadway S.C., Brooklyn, New York City, New York, U.S.	
57	Win	29–19–8 (1)	Arthur Pelkey	KO	7 (10)	Apr 30, 1915	Sohmer Park, Montreal, Quebec, Canada	
56	Loss	28–19–8 (1)	Sam Langford	NWS	10	Apr 6, 1915	135th Street A.C., Manhattan, New York City, New York, U.S.	World colored heavyweight title claim at stake; (via KO only)
55	Loss	28–18–8 (1)	Sam McVey	PTS	20	Feb 20, 1915	Havana, Cuba	
54	Win	28–17–8 (1)	Fred Jackson	TKO	4 (10)	Jan 11, 1915	Pioneer Sporting Club, Manhattan, New York City, New York, U.S.	
53	Loss	27–17–8 (1)	Sam McVey	NWS	10	Dec 10, 1914	Fairmont A.C., Bronx, New York City, New York, U.S.	
52	Draw	27–16–8 (1)	Joe Jeanette	PTS	12	Nov 10, 1914	Atlas A.A., Boston, Massachusetts, U.S.	
51	Draw	27–16–7 (1)	Sam Langford	PTS	12	Sep 15, 1914	Atlas A.A., Boston, Massachusetts, U.S.	For world colored heavyweight title claim
50	Loss	27–16–6 (1)	Sam Langford	NWS	10	Aug 12, 1914	Stadium A.C., Manhattan, New York City, New York, U.S.	World colored heavyweight title claim at stake; (via KO only)
49	Loss	27–15–6 (1)	Joe Jeanette	NWS	10	Aug 5, 1914	Stadium A.C., Manhattan, New York City, New York, U.S.	
48	Loss	27–14–6 (1)	Joe Jeanette	NWS	10	Jul 15, 1914	St. Nicholas Arena, Manhattan, New York City, New York, U.S.	
47	Loss	27–13–6 (1)	Joe Jeanette	NWS	10	Jul 1, 1914	St. Nicholas Arena, Manhattan, New York City, New York, U.S.	
46	Loss	27–12–6 (1)	Porky Dan Flynn	PTS	12	May 19, 1914	Atlas A.A., Boston, Massachusetts, U.S.	
45	Loss	27–11–6 (1)	Sam Langford	NWS	10	Mar 27, 1914	Empire A.C., Manhattan, New York City, New York, U.S.	
44	Draw	27–10–6 (1)	Jack Johnson	PTS	10	Dec 19, 1913	Élysée Montmartre, Paris, Paris, France	For world heavyweight title
43	Win	27–10–5 (1)	Jim Esson	KO	1 (?)	Jun 22, 1913	Américan-Park, Bordeaux, Gironde, France	
42	NC	26–10–5 (1)	Kid Jackson	NC	?	May 29, 1913	Apollo Saint-Michel, Avignon, Vaucluse, France	
41	Win	26–10–5	Bob Scanlon	TKO	6 (20)	May 26, 1913	The Ring, Blackfriars Road, Southwark, London, England, U.K.	
40	Win	25–10–5	Kid Jackson	TKO	10 (?)	May 3, 1913	Eldorado-Casino, Marseille, Bouches-du-Rhône, France	
39	Win	24–10–5	Gustave Marthuin	TKO	8 (20)	Apr 28, 1913	The Ring, Blackfriars Road, Southwark, London, England, U.K.	
38	Win	23–10–5	Con O'Kelly	KO	11 (15)	Apr 3, 1913	Liverpool Stadium, Pudsey Street, Liverpool, Merseyside, England, U.K.	
37	Loss	22–10–5	Joe Jeanette	DQ	15 (?)	Jan 21, 1913	Providence, Rhode Island, U.S.	
36	Win	22–9–5	Tom Overby	KO	6 (10)	Jan 16, 1913	Keystone A.C., Allentown, Pennsylvania, U.S.	
35	Loss	21–9–5	Joe Jeanette	NWS	10	Jan 1, 1913	Irving A.C., Brooklyn, New York City, New York, U.S.	
34	Win	21–8–5	Bill Tate	KO	2 (10)	Dec 1, 1912	Sharkey A.C., Manhattan, New York City, New York, U.S.	
33	Win	20–8–5	Tom Overby	NWS	6	Nov 26, 1912	Spring Garden A.C., Philadelphia, Pennsylvania, U.S.	
32	Win	19–8–5	Black Bill	KO	7 (10)	Nov 12, 1912	Royale A.C., Brooklyn, New York City, New York, U.S.	
31	Loss	18–8–5	Joe Jeanette	NWS	10	Oct 30, 1912	Forty-Fourth Street A.C., Manhattan, New York City, New York, U.S.	
30	Win	18–7–5	Bill Watkins	KO	2 (5)	Sep 30, 1912	American A.C., Philadelphia, Pennsylvania, U.S.	
29	Win	17–7–5	Joe Jeanette	NWS	6	Jul 19, 1912	Olympia A.C., Philadelphia, Pennsylvania, U.S.	
28	Win	16–7–5	Chuck Carleton	NWS	6	May 20, 1912	American A.C., Philadelphia, Pennsylvania, U.S.	
27	Loss	15–7–5	Fred Storbeck	PTS	20	Apr 4, 1912	Liverpool Stadium, Pudsey Street, Liverpool, Merseyside, England, U.K.	
26	Win	15–6–5	Tom Cowler	PTS	15	Mar 30, 1912	The Ring, Blackfriars Road, Southwark, London, England, U.K.	
25	Loss	14–6–5	Alf Langford	DQ	3 (20)	Jan 29, 1912	The Ring, Blackfriars Road, Southwark, London, England, U.K.	Johnson hit Langford when he was down
24	Win	14–5–5	Dennis Haugh	KO	3 (?)	Dec 8, 1911	Cosmopolitan Gymnasium, Plymouth, Devon, England, U.K.	
23	Loss	13–5–5	Matthew Curran	DQ	4 (20)	Dec 1, 1911	Cosmopolitan Gymnasium, Plymouth, Devon, England, U.K.	
22	Loss	13–4–5	Alf Langford	KO	4 (20)	May 22, 1911	Attercliffe Boxing Hall, Sheffield, Yorkshire, England, U.K.	
21	Win	13–3–5	Seaman George Pascall	KO	6 (10)	Feb 20, 1911	The Empire, Holborn, London, England, U.K.	
20	Win	12–3–5	Jewey Smith	TKO	11 (20)	Jan 23, 1911	Wonderland, Whitechapel Road, Mile End, London, England, U.K.	
19	Win	11–3–5	Fred Drummond	TKO	4 (10)	Jan 7, 1911	Wonderland, Whitechapel Road, Mile End, London, England, U.K.	
18	Loss	10–3–5	Sam McVey	KO	21 (25)	Nov 19, 1910	Luna Park Skating Rink, Paris, Paris, France	
17	Win	10–2–5	Gustave Marthuin	PTS	10	Oct 9, 1910	Wonderland, Paris, Paris, France	
16	Win	9–2–5	Jim Maher	KO	3 (10)	Sep 1, 1910	Hippodrome, Paris, Paris, France	
15	Win	8–2–5	Alexandre Meunier	KO	5 (10)	Aug 19, 1910	Hippodrome-Théâtre, Roubaix, Nord, France	
14	Draw	7–2–5	Sam McVey	PTS	15	Aug 7, 1910	Neuilly-sur-Seine, Hauts-de-Seine, France	
13	Draw	7–2–4	Tom Overby	NWS	6	May 31, 1910	Douglas A.C., Philadelphia, Pennsylvania, U.S.	
12	Win	7–2–3	Morris Harris	NWS	6	May 23, 1910	Willis A.C., Philadelphia, Pennsylvania, U.S.	
11	Loss	6–2–3	Sam Langford	NWS	6	May 14, 1910	National A.C., Philadelphia, Pennsylvania, U.S.	World colored heavyweight title claim at stake; (via KO only)
10	Draw	6–1–3	Tony Ross	NWS	6	Apr 19, 1910	Douglas A.C., Philadelphia, Pennsylvania, U.S.	
9	draw	6–1–2	Tom Overby	PTS	10	Apr 14, 1910	Keystone A.C., Allentown, Pennsylvania, U.S.	
8	Draw	6–1–1	Al Kubiak	NWS	6	Mar 29, 1910	Douglas A.C., Philadelphia, Pennsylvania, U.S.	
7	Win	6–1	Charley Stevenson	NWS	6	Mar 14, 1910	West End A.C., Philadelphia, Pennsylvania, U.S.	
6	Win	5–1	Tom Overby	NWS	6	Mar 5, 1910	National A.C., Philadelphia, Pennsylvania, U.S.	
5	Win	4–1	Tom Overby	NWS	6	Feb 19, 1910	Wilkes-Barre, Pennsylvania, U.S.	
4	Loss	3–1	Jeff Clark	NWS	6	Feb 14, 1910	West End A.C., Philadelphia, Pennsylvania, U.S.	
3	Win	3–0	George Kid Cotton	PTS	8	Jan 17, 1910	Phoenix A.C., Memphis, Tennessee, U.S.	
2	Win	2–0	Battling Harris	PTS	8	Jan 3, 1910	Phoenix A.C., Memphis, Tennessee, U.S.	
1	Win	1–0	Battling Brooks	TKO	4 (6)	Mar 26, 1909	Lyric Theatre, Binghamton, New York, U.S.	
