= Joe Jeanette =

American boxer (1879–1958)

Joe Jeannette
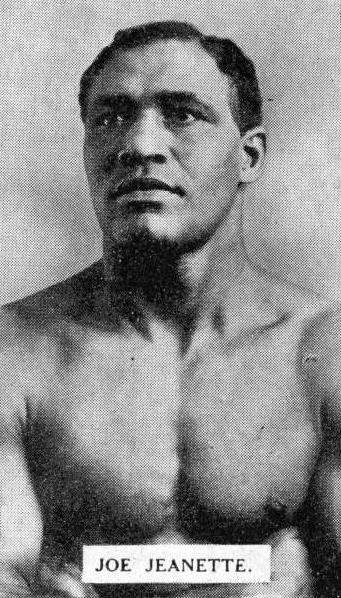
- Jeanette circa 1920

Personal information
- Nickname: The Iron Man
- Born: Joseph Jeremiah Jennette; August 26, 1879 West Hoboken, New Jersey, U.S.
- Died: July 2, 1958 (aged 78)
- Height: 5 ft 10 in (1.78 m)
- Weight: Heavyweight

Boxing career
- Stance: Orthodox

Boxing record
- Total fights: 166; With the inclusion of newspaper decisions
- Wins: 120
- Win by KO: 69
- Losses: 24
- Draws: 21
- No contests: 1

Jeremiah "Joe" Jeannette (also Jennette) (August 26, 1879 – July 2, 1958) was an American boxer, considered one of the best heavyweight boxers of the early 20th century. Because he was African-American, he was not given a shot at the world heavyweight title, though he did win the World Colored Heavyweight Championship on two occasions.

== Early life and career ==
Jeannette was born on August 26, 1879, in West Hoboken, New Jersey, which is now part of Union City, to Mena and Benjamin F. Jeanette, who worked for a local blacksmith. He began work as his father's apprentice, and then as a coal truck driver for Jaels and Bellis. In 1904, at the age of 25, he began his boxing career on a dare, fighting against Arthur Dickinson in Jersey City. At 5 ft 10 in (1.78 m) and weighing 190 lb (86 kg), Jeanette was relatively short and stocky, with his initial knowledge of fighting stemming from youthful street brawls.

== Professional career ==
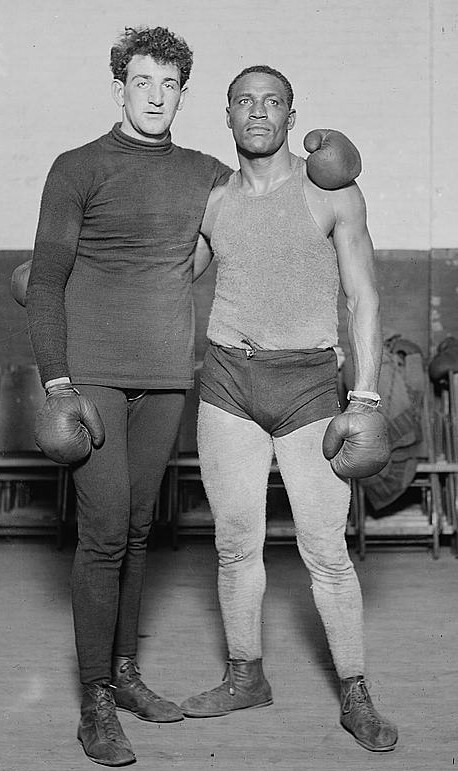
Jeanette and Tom Kennedy, circa 1910-1915

Within two years, Jeanette was considered one of the best black heavyweights in the United States. Jeanette mimicked the style of Sam Langford, whom he fought 15 times (some sources say 14), developing defensive techniques that were elusive and effective. Opponents considered Jeanette, whose style reflected the "inside punching" style of the times, a dangerous inside boxer whom few wished to fight. Because of the racial barrier, black boxers only had a small number of prospective opponents from which to choose, and often ended up matched against the same fighters over and over.

Jeanette fought the future heavyweight champion Jack Johnson seven times in his first two years as a pro, and a total of ten times. According to the Ken Burns documentary Unforgivable Blackness, Jeanette lost twice, won one fight on a foul after two rounds, had two draws, and five "No Decisions" in his fights against Johnson. Johnson called Jeannette "the toughest man I ever fought."

After Johnson became the first African-American Heavyweight Champion of the World on December 26, 1908, he never again fought Jeanette, despite numerous challenges. Johnson's refusal to fight African-Americans offended the African-American community. Jeanette criticized Johnson, saying, "Jack forgot about his old friends after he became champion and drew the color line against his own people."

Jeanette was never allowed to fight for the heavyweight championship during his 15-year career, despite having a stellar record against opponents of all races.

Joe's most memorable fight occurred on April 17, 1909 in a return bout with Sam McVey in Paris, France that lasted three-and-a-half-hours, and 49 rounds, the longest boxing match of the 20th century, and one of the greatest marathons in boxing history. Although McVey began the fight strong and looked like a sure winner, knocking down the usually sturdy Jeannette 27 times, and almost knocking him out in the 16th round with a right uppercut to Jeanette's jaw, he weakened greatly by the 19th round. Jeanette took control, knocking down McVey, a boxer (who had only been stopped once in his career, by Johnson), 19 times. After the 49th round, McVey could not rise from his stool at the call of time and Jeannette was declared winner on a technical knockout. This won him the "World Colored Heavyweight Championship," as Jack Johnson had defeated Tommy Burns for his heavyweight title the previous December.

Jeanette retired in 1919 at the age of 40. Of his 166 documented pro fights (he believed it was closer to 400), in a career spanning 1904-1922, Jeanette had 106 wins, 68 of which were by knockout, with 20 losses. Only two of his losses were by knockout, once early in his career and once late in his career. He is rated alongside the very best boxers of his era, including Johnson, Langford, and McVey.

He starred in the 1922 film Square Joe.

== Personal life ==
Jeanette met his wife, Adelaide, at a dance in Hoboken. They had two children, a son, Joe Jr., and a daughter, Agnes.

== Post-boxing career and legacy ==
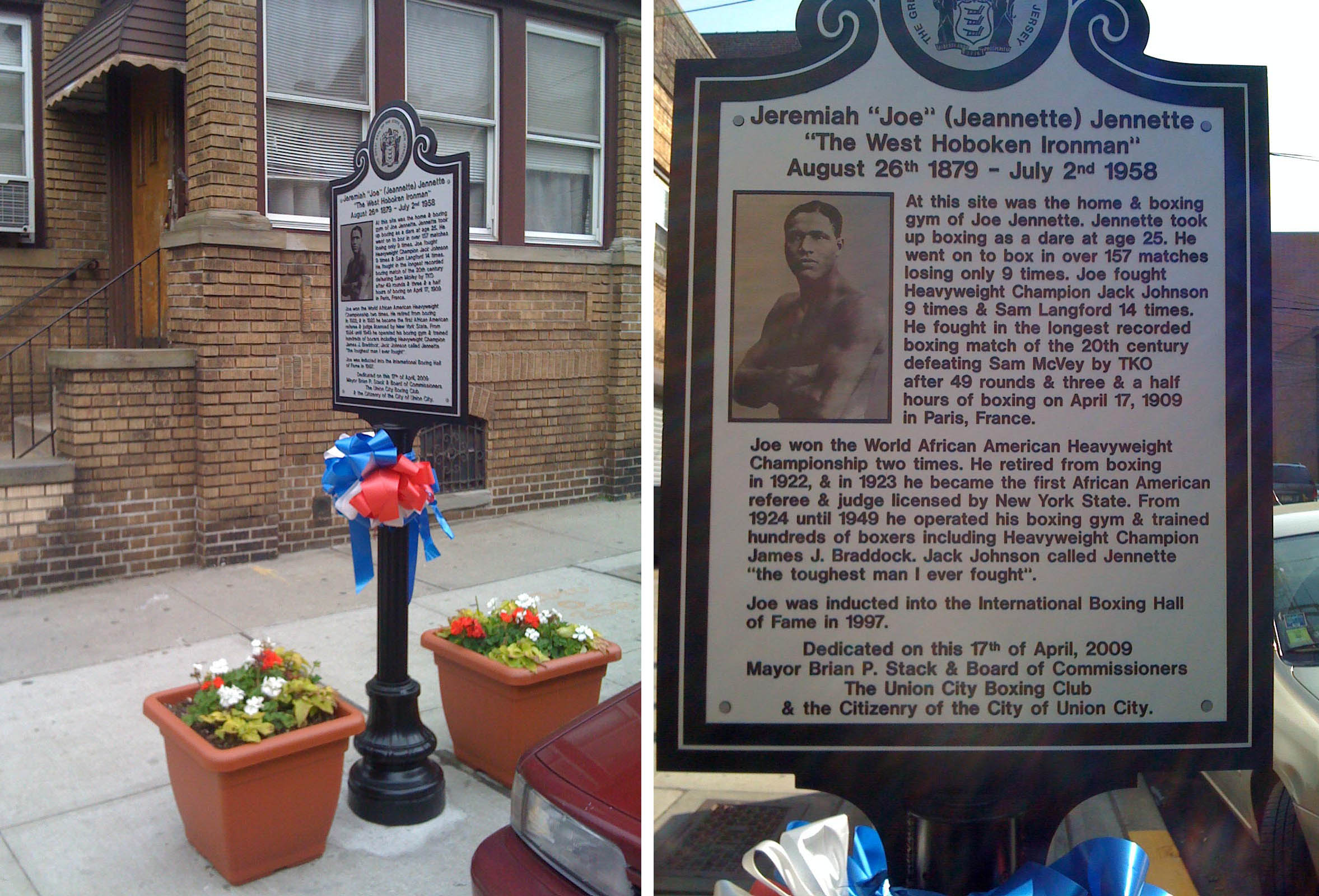
Historical marker in Union City, New Jersey, in front of where Jeanette's home and gym once stood

Unlike many boxers, Jeanette was not a spendthrift and invested his money and time wisely. He spent most of his career fighting in and around the Eastern Seaboard, with only brief tours of Europe. After his career, he became a referee and a trainer of young boxers. He owned a boxing gym on 27th Street and Summit Avenue in Union City, New Jersey, where he was a fixture on the boxing scene for many years, training hundreds of boxers, including Heavyweight Champion James J. Braddock.

Jeanette, who was fond of automobiles, eventually converted his boxing gym into a garage, out of which he operated a fleet of rental limousines, and then a taxi company named Adelaide, after his wife, which was located at 522 Clinton Avenue, now New York Avenue.

Jeanette died in 1958. He is buried in Fairview, New Jersey.

He was inducted into the International Boxing Hall of Fame in 1997.

A street in Union City, located between Summit Avenue and Kennedy Boulevard, was named Jeanette Street in his honor.

A historical marker was subsequently dedicated at the corner of Summit Avenue and 27th Street, where Jeanette's former residence and gym once stood. It was the first historical marker erected by the city, and was installed on April 17, 2009, the 100th anniversary of Jeannette’s 49th-round knockout of Sam McVea.

== Professional boxing record ==
All information in this section is derived from BoxRec, unless otherwise noted.

=== Official record ===
166 fights	84 wins	10 losses
By knockout	69	2
By decision	9	8
By disqualification	6	0
Draws	9	
No contests	1	
Newspaper decisions/draws	62	

All newspaper decisions are officially regarded as "no decision" bouts and are not counted in the win/loss/draw column.

No.	Result	Record	Opponent	Type	Round	Date	Location	Notes
166	Draw	84–10–9 (63)	Harry Gibson	PTS	6	Jun 1, 1922	Orange, New Jersey, US	
165	Win	84–10–8 (63)	Bartley Madden	DQ	4 (8)	Nov 11, 1919	Schuetzen Park, Bayonne, New Jersey, US	
164	Loss	83–10–8 (63)	Harry Wills	NWS	8	Oct 20, 1919	4th Regiment Armory, Jersey City, New Jersey, US	World colored heavyweight title at stake; (via KO only)
163	Win	83–10–8 (62)	Tom Cowler	NWS	10	May 23, 1919	Broadway Auditorium, Buffalo, New York, US	
162	Win	83–10–8 (61)	Clay Turner	NWS	8	May 1, 1919	Open-Air Arena, Jersey City, New Jersey, US	
161	Win	83–10–8 (60)	Bert Kenny	NWS	8	Apr 15, 1919	Spring A.C., West Hoboken, New Jersey, US	
160	Win	83–10–8 (59)	Tom Cowler	NWS	8	Feb 10, 1919	Grand View Auditorium, Jersey City, New Jersey, US	
159	Win	83–10–8 (58)	Andy Schmader	NWS	8	Dec 20, 1918	Spring A.C., West Hoboken, New Jersey, US	
158	Win	83–10–8 (57)	Andy Schmader	NWS	8	Dec 2, 1918	Spring A.C., West Hoboken, New Jersey, US	
157	Loss	83–10–8 (56)	Kid Norfolk	NWS	8	Oct 11, 1918	Spring A.C., West Hoboken, New Jersey, US	
156	Win	83–10–8 (55)	Battling Jim Johnson	PTS	?	Aug 27, 1918	Wiedenmayer Park, Jersey City, New Jersey, US	
155	Loss	82–10–8 (55)	Kid Norfolk	NWS	8	Jul 19, 1918	International League Ballpark, Jersey City, New Jersey, US	
154	Win	82–10–8 (54)	Jack Thompson	NWS	6	Apr 15, 1918	Olympia A.C., Philadelphia, Pennsylvania, US	
153	Win	82–10–8 (53)	George Christian	NWS	6	Dec 19, 1917	National A.C., Philadelphia, Pennsylvania, US	
152	Draw	82–10–8 (52)	Gabe Gulart	NWS	10	Sep 15, 1917	Clermont Avenue Rink, New York City, New York, US	
151	Loss	82–10–8 (51)	Sam Langford	NWS	12	Sep 14, 1917	Coliseum, Toledo, Ohio, US	World colored heavyweight title at stake; (via KO only)
150	Win	82–10–8 (50)	Andre Anderson	NWS	10	Jul 20, 1917	Vanderbilt A.C., New York City, New York, US	
149	Win	82–10–8 (49)	Tango Kid	KO	5 (10)	Jul 6, 1917	Vanderbilt A.C., New York City, New York, US	
148	Win	81–10–8 (49)	Tony Ross	KO	3 (10)	Dec 4, 1916	Mishler Theatre, Altoona, Pennsylvania, US	
147	Win	80–10–8 (49)	Jack Hubbard	KO	5 (10)	Sep 4, 1916	Garland City Park, Watertown, New York, US	
146	Win	79–10–8 (49)	Jack Driscoll	KO	3 (?)	Aug 19, 1916	Washington Park A.C., New York City, New York, US	
145	Win	78–10–8 (49)	Jim Smith	TKO	5 (10)	Aug 17, 1916	Averne A.C., Averne, Queens, New York City, New York, US	
144	Win	77–10–8 (49)	Porky Dan Flynn	NWS	10	Aug 4, 1916	Flower City A.C., Rochester, New York, US	
143	Loss	77–10–8 (48)	Sam Langford	KO	7 (10)	May 12, 1916	Arena, Syracuse, New York, US	Lost world colored heavyweight title; For world colored heavyweight title claim (undisputed)
142	Win	77–9–8 (48)	George Kid Cotton	KO	2 (10)	Mar 24, 1916	East New York A.C., New York City, New York, US	
141	Win	76–9–8 (48)	Silas Green	KO	6 (10)	Feb 25, 1916	Canadian A.C., Montreal, Quebec, Canada	Retained world colored heavyweight title
140	Win	75–9–8 (48)	Bill Watkins	NWS	10	Jul 2, 1915	St. Nicholas Arena, New York City, New York, US	
139	Win	75–9–8 (47)	Battling Brooks	KO	5 (?)	May 14, 1915	New York City, New York, US	
138	Loss	74–9–8 (47)	Battling Jim Johnson	NWS	10	May 10, 1915	Sohmer Park, Montreal, Quebec, Canada	
137	Draw	74–9–8 (46)	Sam McVea	PTS	12	Apr 27, 1915	Atlas A.A., Boston, Massachusetts, US	Retained world colored heavyweight title
136	Win	74–9–7 (46)	Battling Brooks	KO	4 (?)	Apr 19, 1915	New York City, New York, US	
135	Win	73–9–7 (46)	Sam Langford	PTS	12	Apr 13, 1915	Atlas A.A., Boston, Massachusetts, US	Won world colored heavyweight title
134	Win	72–9–7 (46)	Arthur Pelkey	TKO	8 (10)	Apr 9, 1915	Sohmer Park, Montreal, Quebec, Canada	
133	Win	71–9–7 (46)	Cleve Hawkins	NWS	10	Mar 19, 1915	Canadian A.C., Montreal, Quebec, Canada	
132	Win	71–9–7 (45)	Larry Williams	KO	5 (10)	Feb 26, 1915	Montreal, Quebec, Canada	
131	Win	70–9–7 (45)	Bill Tate	TKO	2 (10)	Feb 1, 1915	Vanderbilt A.C., New York City, New York, US	
130	Win	69–9–7 (45)	John Lester Johnson	NWS	10	Jan 11, 1915	Pioneer Sporting Club, New York City, New York, US	
129	Win	69–9–7 (44)	Bill Tate	NWS	10	Dec 14, 1914	Irving A.C., New York City, New York, US	
128	Draw	69–9–7 (43)	Battling Jim Johnson	PTS	12	Nov 10, 1914	Atlas A.A., Boston, Massachusetts, US	
127	Draw	69–9–6 (43)	Sam Langford	NWS	10	Oct 1, 1914	Stadium A.C., New York City, New York, US	
126	Win	69–9–6 (42)	Jim Kruger	KO	2 (?)	Sep 12, 1914	Martins Ferry, Ohio, US	
125	Win	68–9–6 (42)	Bill Tate	TKO	6 (10)	Aug 11, 1914	Rockaway Beach A.A., New York City, New York, US	
124	Win	67–9–6 (42)	Battling Jim Johnson	NWS	10	Aug 5, 1914	Stadium A.C., New York City, New York, US	
123	Win	67–9–6 (41)	Black Bill	TKO	9 (10)	Aug 1, 1914	Irving A.C., New York City, New York, US	
122	Win	66–9–6 (41)	Battling Jim Johnson	NWS	10	Jul 15, 1914	St. Nicholas Arena, New York City, New York, US	
121	Win	66–9–6 (40)	Battling Jim Johnson	NWS	10	Jul 1, 1914	St. Nicholas Arena, New York City, New York, US	
120	Win	66–9–6 (39)	Silas Green	TKO	3 (10)	Jun 16, 1914	Broadway S.C., New York City, New York, US	
119	Draw	65–9–6 (39)	Harry Wills	NWS	10	Jun 9, 1914	National Baseball Park, New Orleans, Louisiana, US	
118	Win	65–9–6 (38)	Colin Bell	PTS	20	May 4, 1914	Premierland, Whitechapel, London, England, U.K.	
117	Win	64–9–6 (38)	Kid Jackson	KO	7 (20)	May 2, 1914	Wonderland, Paris, France	
116	Win	63–9–6 (38)	Andy Johnson	KO	4 (?)	Apr 8, 1914	Liverpool Stadium, Liverpool, Merseyside, England, U.K.	
115	Win	62–9–6 (38)	Georges Carpentier	PTS	15	Mar 21, 1914	Luna Parc, Porte Maillot, Paris, France	
114	Win	61–9–6 (38)	Alf Langford	DQ	7 (20)	Feb 21, 1914	Wonderland, Paris, France	Langford threw a wild shot and fell over motionless. DQ by ref for suspected dive
113	Loss	60–9–6 (38)	Sam Langford	PTS	20	Dec 20, 1913	Luna Park Arena, Paris, France	For vacant world heavyweight title claim; As recognized by the French Boxing Federation
112	Win	60–8–6 (38)	Sam Langford	NWS	10	Oct 3, 1913	Madison Square Garden, New York City, New York, US	World colored heavyweight title at stake; (via KO only)
111	Win	60–8–6 (37)	John Lester Johnson	NWS	10	Jul 22, 1913	Atlantic Garden A.C., New York City, New York, US	
110	Win	60–8–6 (36)	Nat Dewey	PTS	10	Jul 4, 1913	Savannah, Georgia, US	
109	Draw	59–8–6 (36)	Harry Wills	PTS	10	Jul 1, 1913	Northside A.C., New Orleans, Louisiana, US	
108	Win	59–8–5 (36)	Al Benedict	TKO	3 (15)	Jun 27, 1913	Joplin, Missouri, US	
107	NC	58–8–5 (36)	Jeff Clark	NC	7 (8)	Jun 23, 1913	Phoenix A.C., Memphis, Tennessee, US	Fight was stopped by the referee as he felt Jennette wasn't trying for the KO
106	Win	58–8–5 (35)	Black Bill	NWS	10	May 21, 1913	Gowanus A.C., New York City, New York, US	
105	Win	58–8–5 (34)	George Kid Cotton	KO	4 (6)	Apr 16, 1913	Olympia A.C., Philadelphia, Pennsylvania, US	
104	Win	57–8–5 (34)	Jack Reed	KO	3 (10)	Mar 17, 1913	Queensboro A.C., New York City, New York, US	
103	Win	56–8–5 (34)	Jack Reed	KO	3 (10)	Feb 10, 1913	Olympia Club, Hazleton, Pennsylvania, US	
102	Loss	55–8–5 (34)	Jack Thompson	PTS	?	Feb 2, 1913	United States of America	Exact date and location unknown
101	Win	55–7–5 (34)	Chuck Carleton	KO	1 (6)	Jan 24, 1913	Easton, Pennsylvania, US	
100	Win	54–7–5 (34)	Battling Jim Johnson	DQ	15 (?)	Jan 21, 1913	Providence, Rhode Island, US	
99	Win	53–7–5 (34)	Jeff Clark	NWS	10	Jan 17, 1913	Southwest A.C., Joplin, Missouri, US	
98	Win	53–7–5 (33)	Battling Jim Johnson	NWS	10	Jan 1, 1913	Irving A.C., New York City, New York, US	
97	Win	53–7–5 (32)	Chuck Carleton	TKO	2 (10)	Dec 6, 1912	National A.C., New York City, New York, US	
96	Win	52–7–5 (32)	George Christian	KO	8 (10)	Nov 27, 1912	Columbus, Ohio, US	
95	Win	51–7–5 (32)	Battling Jim Johnson	NWS	10	Oct 30, 1912	Forty-Fourth Street A.C., New York City, New York, US	
94	Win	51–7–5 (31)	Tony Ross	DQ	7 (10)	Sep 9, 1912	Madison Square Garden, New York City, New York, US	
93	Draw	50–7–5 (31)	Jeff Clark	NWS	6	Sep 2, 1912	Exposition Hall, Pittsburgh, Pennsylvania, US	
92	Win	50–7–5 (30)	Griff Jones	KO	2 (10)	Aug 30, 1912	Atlantic A.A., New York City, New York, US	
91	Win	49–7–5 (30)	Bill Tate	KO	2 (6)	Aug 20, 1912	Morris Park, Newark, New Jersey, US	
90	Win	48–7–5 (30)	Battling Brooks	KO	2 (?)	Aug 20, 1912	Morris Park, Newark, New Jersey, US	
89	Win	47–7–5 (30)	Jeff Madden	TKO	2 (10)	Aug 19, 1912	Madison Square Garden, New York City, New York, US	
88	Win	46–7–5 (30)	Young Hank Griffin	KO	3 (6)	Aug 9, 1912	Scranton, Pennsylvania, US	
87	Loss	45–7–5 (30)	Battling Jim Johnson	NWS	6	Jul 19, 1912	Olympia A.C., Philadelphia, Pennsylvania, US	
86	Win	45–7–5 (29)	Jeff Madden	TKO	4 (?)	Jul 15, 1912	New Bedford, Massachusetts, US	
85	Win	44–7–5 (29)	Mickey McDonough	TKO	2 (?)	Jul 15, 1912	New Bedford, Massachusetts, US	
84	Win	43–7–5 (29)	Black Bill	DQ	6 (10)	Jun 15, 1912	Royale A.C., New York City, New York, US	
83	Win	42–7–5 (29)	George Rodel	KO	11 (15)	May 24, 1912	Old Cosmo Rink, Plymouth, Devon, England, U.K.	
82	Win	41–7–5 (29)	Young Johnny Johnson	RTD	3 (10)	May 13, 1912	National AC, Glasgow, Scotland, U.K.	
81	Win	40–7–5 (29)	Black Bill	KO	3 (12)	Apr 4, 1912	Lewiston, Maine, US	
80	Win	39–7–5 (29)	Griff Jones	TKO	4 (10)	Apr 1, 1912	Olympia Boxing Club, New York City, New York, US	
79	Win	38–7–5 (29)	Nat Dewey	TKO	7 (10)	Mar 13, 1912	Long Acre A.A., New York City, New York, US	
78	Win	37–7–5 (29)	Andy Morris	TKO	6 (15)	Feb 27, 1912	Casino, New Haven, Connecticut, US	
77	Win	36–7–5 (29)	Morris Harris	NWS	3	Feb 19, 1912	American A.C., Philadelphia, Pennsylvania, US	
76	Win	36–7–5 (28)	Chuck Carleton	NWS	3	Feb 19, 1912	American A.C., Philadelphia, Pennsylvania, US	
75	Win	36–7–5 (27)	Griff Jones	TKO	3 (10)	Jan 19, 1912	Oneida County A.A., Utica, New York, US	
74	Win	35–7–5 (27)	Jack "Twin" Sullivan	NWS	10	Dec 26, 1911	Convention Hall, Buffalo, New York, US	
73	Win	35–7–5 (26)	Topeka Jack Johnson	KO	3 (?)	Dec 21, 1911	Louisiana A.C., New Orleans, Louisiana, US	
72	Win	34–7–5 (26)	Al Mitchell	KO	4 (?)	Dec 18, 1911	Memphis, Tennessee, US	
71	Win	33–7–5 (26)	Nat Dewey	PTS	8	Dec 15, 1911	Chattanooga, Tennessee, US	
70	Win	32–7–5 (26)	Young Jack Johnson	KO	4 (8)	Dec 11, 1911	Memphis, Tennessee, US	
69	Win	31–7–5 (26)	Jewey Smith	KO	3 (?)	Dec 7, 1911	Fordham A.C., New York City, New York, US	
68	Win	30–7–5 (26)	Bill Watkins	KO	1 (?)	Nov 30, 1911	German Hall, Albany, New York, US	
67	Loss	29–7–5 (26)	Sam Langford	NWS	10	Sep 5, 1911	Madison Square Garden, New York City, New York, US	World colored heavyweight title at stake; (via KO only)
66	Win	29–7–5 (25)	Porky Dan Flynn	NWS	10	Aug 29, 1911	Fairmont A.C., New York City, New York, US	
65	Win	29–7–5 (24)	Dummy Maxson	KO	1 (10)	Aug 23, 1911	Fairmont A.C., New York City, New York, US	
64	Draw	28–7–5 (24)	Tony Ross	NWS	10	Aug 1, 1911	20th Century A.C., New York City, New York, US	
63	Win	28–7–5 (23)	Al Kubiak	KO	3 (10)	Jul 25, 1911	20th Century A.C., New York City, New York, US	
62	Win	27–7–5 (23)	Al Kubiak	KO	9 (10)	Apr 20, 1911	National S.C., New York City, New York, US	
61	Win	26–7–5 (23)	Jim Barry	NWS	10	Mar 16, 1911	National S.C., New York City, New York, US	
60	Draw	26–7–5 (22)	Jim Barry	NWS	6	Feb 8, 1911	American A.C., Philadelphia, Pennsylvania, US	
59	Loss	26–7–5 (21)	Sam Langford	PTS	12	Jan 10, 1911	Armory A.A., Boston, Massachusetts, US	For world colored heavyweight title
58	Win	26–6–5 (21)	Jeff Clark	PTS	10	Dec 27, 1910	Central Institute, Newark, New Jersey, US	
57	Win	25–6–5 (21)	Black Bill	KO	5 (10)	Nov 10, 1910	Long Acre A.C., New York City, New York, US	
56	Win	24–6–5 (21)	Morris Harris	NWS	10	Sep 30, 1910	National A.C., New York City, New York, US	
55	Loss	24–6–5 (20)	Sam Langford	PTS	15	Sep 6, 1910	Armory A.A., Boston, Massachusetts, US	Lost world colored heavyweight title; For world colored heavyweight title claim
54	Draw	24–5–5 (20)	Morris Harris	NWS	10	Jul 1, 1910	National S.C., New York City, New York, US	
53	Win	24–5–5 (19)	Jim Smith	NWS	10	Jun 3, 1910	National S.C., New York City, New York, US	
52	Win	24–5–5 (18)	Andy Morris	TKO	3 (12)	May 24, 1910	Armory A.A., Boston, Massachusetts, US	
51	Draw	23–5–5 (18)	Sam McVea	PTS	30	Dec 11, 1909	Cirque d'Hiver, Paris, France	Retained world colored heavyweight title
50	Draw	23–5–4 (18)	Sid Russell	PTS	15	Nov 13, 1909	Wonderland, Paris, France	
49	Win	23–5–3 (18)	Al Kubiak	KO	10 (20)	Oct 30, 1909	Cirque de Paris, Paris, France	
48	Draw	22–5–3 (18)	Al Kubiak	NWS	6	Sep 18, 1909	National A.C., Philadelphia, Pennsylvania, US	
47	Win	22–5–3 (17)	Sandy Ferguson	TKO	8 (10)	Aug 27, 1909	Fairmont A.C., New York City, New York, US	
46	Loss	21–5–3 (17)	Sandy Ferguson	PTS	12	Jun 22, 1909	Armory A.C., Boston, Massachusetts, US	
45	Win	21–4–3 (17)	Trooper G. Cook	RTD	2 (6)	May 27, 1909	Arena, Villiers Street, Strand, London, England, U.K.	
44	Win	20–4–3 (17)	Harry Shearing	RTD	4 (6)	May 27, 1909	Arena, Villiers Street, Strand, London, England, U.K.	
43	Win	19–4–3 (17)	Sandy Ferguson	PTS	20	May 22, 1909	Cirque de Paris, Paris, France	
42	Win	18–4–3 (17)	Jack Scales	KO	1 (10)	May 1, 1909	Cirque d'Hiver, Paris, France	
41	Win	17–4–3 (17)	Sam McVea	RTD	49	Apr 17, 1909	Cirque de Paris, Paris, France	Won world colored heavyweight title; A fight to the finish
40	Loss	16–4–3 (17)	Sam McVea	PTS	20	Feb 20, 1909	Cirque de Paris, Paris, France	For vacant world colored heavyweight title
39	Win	16–3–3 (17)	Charley Croxon	TKO	2 (10)	Feb 6, 1909	Folies Bergère, Paris, France	
38	Win	15–3–3 (17)	Ben Taylor	KO	3 (?)	Jan 23, 1909	Folies Bergère, Paris, France	
37	Win	14–3–3 (17)	Morris Harris	NWS	6	Dec 7, 1908	West End A.C., Philadelphia, Pennsylvania, US	
36	Win	14–3–3 (16)	Sandy Ferguson	PTS	12	Sep 15, 1908	Armory, Boston, Massachusetts, US	
35	Draw	13–3–3 (16)	Sam Langford	NWS	6	Sep 1, 1908	National A.C., New York City, New York, US	
34	Draw	13–3–3 (15)	Jim Barry	NWS	6	May 8, 1908	Consolidated A.C., New York City, New York, US	
33	Win	13–3–3 (14)	Sam Campbell	TKO	6 (?)	Mar 9, 1908	Consolidated A.C., New York City, New York, US	
32	Draw	12–3–3 (14)	Sam Langford	PTS	12	Mar 3, 1908	Armory, Boston, Massachusetts, US	
31	Win	12–3–2 (14)	George Cole	TKO	4 (6)	Feb 17, 1908	Consolidated A.C., New York City, New York, US	
30	Win	11–3–2 (14)	Jim Jeffords	KO	2 (6)	Jan 27, 1908	Consolidated A.C., New York City, New York, US	
29	Win	10–3–2 (14)	Griff Jones	KO	3 (?)	Jan 13, 1908	Consolidated A.C., New York City, New York, US	
28	Win	9–3–2 (14)	Joe Phillips	KO	3 (6)	Jan 13, 1908	Consolidated A.C., New York City, New York, US	
27	Win	8–3–2 (14)	Morris Harris	TKO	4 (?)	Jun 11, 1907	Consolidated A.C., New York City, New York, US	
26	Win	7–3–2 (14)	Sam McVea	NWS	10	Apr 15, 1907	Lyric Hall, New York City, New York, US	
25	Win	7–3–2 (13)	Young Peter Jackson	NWS	6	Mar 8, 1907	Spring Garden A.C., Philadelphia, Pennsylvania, US	
24	Win	7–3–2 (12)	Jim Jeffords	KO	7 (10)	Feb 11, 1907	Casco A.C., Portland, Oregon, US	
23	Draw	6–3–2 (12)	Sam Langford	PTS	12	Jan 11, 1907	Unity Cycle Club, Lawrence, Massachusetts, US	
22	Draw	6–3–1 (12)	Jack Johnson	NWS	10	Nov 26, 1906	Auditorium, Portland, Oregon, US	World colored heavyweight title at stake; (via KO only)
21	Loss	6–3–1 (11)	Jack Johnson	NWS	6	Sep 20, 1906	Broadway A.C., Philadelphia, Pennsylvania, US	
20	Win	6–3–1 (10)	Black Bill	KO	4 (6)	Sep 6, 1906	Broadway A.C., Philadelphia, Pennsylvania, US	
19	Loss	5–3–1 (10)	Sam Langford	PTS	15	Apr 5, 1906	Lincoln A.C., Chelsea, Massachusetts, US	
18	Loss	5–2–1 (10)	Jack Johnson	PTS	15	Mar 14, 1906	Germania Maennerchor Hall, Baltimore, Maryland, US	For world colored heavyweight title
17	Loss	5–1–1 (10)	Jack Johnson	NWS	3	Jan 16, 1906	Sharkey A.C., New York City, New York, US	
16	Win	5–1–1 (9)	Sam Langford	TKO	8 (12)	Dec 25, 1905	Unity Cycle Club, Lawrence, Massachusetts, US	Langford retired after round 8
15	Win	4–1–1 (9)	Walter Johnson	TKO	2 (3)	Dec 21, 1905	Long Acre A.C., New York City, New York, US	
14	Loss	3–1–1 (9)	Jack Johnson	NWS	6	Dec 2, 1905	National A.C., Philadelphia, Pennsylvania, US	
13	Win	3–1–1 (8)	Jack Johnson	DQ	2 (6)	Nov 25, 1905	National A.C., Philadelphia, Pennsylvania, US	Jennette was winning the fight until he was fouled
12	Draw	2–1–1 (8)	Black Bill	PTS	6	Nov 2, 1905	National S.C., Wilmington, Delaware, US	
11	Win	2–1 (8)	George Cole	NWS	6	Oct 28, 1905	National A.C., Philadelphia, Pennsylvania, US	
10	Win	2–1 (7)	Jim Jeffords	NWS	6	Oct 26, 1905	Broadway A.C., Philadelphia, Pennsylvania, US	
9	Win	2–1 (6)	Black Bill	KO	7 (10)	Oct 11, 1905	National S.C., Wilmington, New Jersey, US	
8	Win	1–1 (6)	Pat O'Rourke	KO	5 (?)	Oct 7, 1905	North Bergen, New Jersey, US	
7	Win	0–1 (6)	George Cole	NWS	6	Aug 28, 1905	National A.C., Philadelphia, Pennsylvania, US	
6	Loss	0–1 (5)	George Cole	NWS	6	Jul 6, 1905	Broadway A.C., Philadelphia, Pennsylvania, US	
5	Win	0–1 (4)	Black Bill	NWS	6	Jun 8, 1905	Broadway A.C., Philadelphia, Pennsylvania, US	
4	Loss	0–1 (3)	Jack Johnson	NWS	3	May 9, 1905	Knickerbocker A.C., Philadelphia, Pennsylvania, US	
3	Loss	0–1 (2)	Black Bill	KO	2 (6)	Apr 20, 1905	Broadway A.C., Philadelphia, Pennsylvania, US	
2	Loss	0–0 (2)	Morris Harris	NWS	6	Mar 2, 1905	Broadway A.C., Philadelphia, Pennsylvania, US	
1	Loss	0–0 (1)	Morris Harris	NWS	6	Nov 11, 1904	Manhattan A.C., Philadelphia, Pennsylvania, US	

=== Unofficial record ===
166 fights	121 wins	24 losses
By knockout	69	2
By decision	46	22
By disqualification	6	0
Draws	20	
No contests	1	

Record with the inclusion of newspaper decisions in the win/loss/draw column.

No.	Result	Record	Opponent	Type	Round	Date	Location	Notes
166	Draw	121–24–20 (1)	Harry Gibson	PTS	6	Jun 1, 1922	Orange, New Jersey, US	
165	Win	121–24–19 (1)	Bartley Madden	DQ	4 (8)	Nov 11, 1919	Schuetzen Park, Bayonne, New Jersey, US	
164	Loss	120–24–19 (1)	Harry Wills	NWS	8	Oct 20, 1919	4th Regiment Armory, Jersey City, New Jersey, US	World colored heavyweight title at stake; (via KO only)
163	Win	120–23–19 (1)	Tom Cowler	NWS	10	May 23, 1919	Broadway Auditorium, Buffalo, New York, US	
162	Win	119–23–19 (1)	Clay Turner	NWS	8	May 1, 1919	Open-Air Arena, Jersey City, New Jersey, US	
161	Win	118–23–19 (1)	Bert Kenny	NWS	8	Apr 15, 1919	Spring A.C., West Hoboken, New Jersey, US	
160	Win	117–23–19 (1)	Tom Cowler	NWS	8	Feb 10, 1919	Grand View Auditorium, Jersey City, New Jersey, US	
159	Win	116–23–19 (1)	Andy Schmader	NWS	8	Dec 20, 1918	Spring A.C., West Hoboken, New Jersey, US	
158	Win	115–23–19 (1)	Andy Schmader	NWS	8	Dec 2, 1918	Spring A.C., West Hoboken, New Jersey, US	
157	Loss	114–23–19 (1)	Kid Norfolk	NWS	8	Oct 11, 1918	Spring A.C., West Hoboken, New Jersey, US	
156	Win	114–22–19 (1)	Battling Jim Johnson	PTS	?	Aug 27, 1918	Wiedenmayer Park, Jersey City, New Jersey, US	
155	Loss	113–22–19 (1)	Kid Norfolk	NWS	8	Jul 19, 1918	International League Ballpark, Jersey City, New Jersey, US	
154	Win	113–21–19 (1)	Jack Thompson	NWS	6	Apr 15, 1918	Olympia A.C., Philadelphia, Pennsylvania, US	
153	Win	112–21–19 (1)	George Christian	NWS	6	Dec 19, 1917	National A.C., Philadelphia, Pennsylvania, US	
152	Draw	111–21–19 (1)	Gabe Gulart	NWS	10	Sep 15, 1917	Clermont Avenue Rink, New York City, New York, US	
151	Loss	111–21–18 (1)	Sam Langford	NWS	12	Sep 14, 1917	Coliseum, Toledo, Ohio, US	World colored heavyweight title at stake; (via KO only)
150	Win	111–20–18 (1)	Andre Anderson	NWS	10	Jul 20, 1917	Vanderbilt A.C., New York City, New York, US	
149	Win	110–20–18 (1)	Tango Kid	KO	5 (10)	Jul 6, 1917	Vanderbilt A.C., New York City, New York, US	
148	Win	109–20–18 (1)	Tony Ross	KO	3 (10)	Dec 4, 1916	Mishler Theatre, Altoona, Pennsylvania, US	
147	Win	108–20–18 (1)	Jack Hubbard	KO	5 (10)	Sep 4, 1916	Garland City Park, Watertown, New York, US	
146	Win	107–20–18 (1)	Jack Driscoll	KO	3 (?)	Aug 19, 1916	Washington Park A.C., New York City, New York, US	
145	Win	106–20–18 (1)	Jim Smith	TKO	5 (10)	Aug 17, 1916	Averne A.C., Averne, Queens, New York City, New York, US	
144	Win	105–20–18 (1)	Porky Dan Flynn	NWS	10	Aug 4, 1916	Flower City A.C., Rochester, New York, US	
143	Loss	104–20–18 (1)	Sam Langford	KO	7 (10)	May 12, 1916	Arena, Syracuse, New York, US	Lost world colored heavyweight title; For world colored heavyweight title claim (undisputed)
142	Win	104–19–18 (1)	George Kid Cotton	KO	2 (10)	Mar 24, 1916	East New York A.C., New York City, New York, US	
141	Win	103–19–18 (1)	Silas Green	KO	6 (10)	Feb 25, 1916	Canadian A.C., Montreal, Quebec, Canada	Retained world colored heavyweight title
140	Win	102–19–18 (1)	Bill Watkins	NWS	10	Jul 2, 1915	St. Nicholas Arena, New York City, New York, US	
139	Win	101–19–18 (1)	Battling Brooks	KO	5 (?)	May 14, 1915	New York City, New York, US	
138	Loss	100–19–18 (1)	Battling Jim Johnson	NWS	10	May 10, 1915	Sohmer Park, Montreal, Quebec, Canada	
137	Draw	100–18–18 (1)	Sam McVea	PTS	12	Apr 27, 1915	Atlas A.A., Boston, Massachusetts, US	Retained world colored heavyweight title
136	Win	100–18–17 (1)	Battling Brooks	KO	4 (?)	Apr 19, 1915	New York City, New York, US	
135	Win	99–18–17 (1)	Sam Langford	PTS	12	Apr 13, 1915	Atlas A.A., Boston, Massachusetts, US	Won world colored heavyweight title
134	Win	98–18–17 (1)	Arthur Pelkey	TKO	8 (10)	Apr 9, 1915	Sohmer Park, Montreal, Quebec, Canada	
133	Win	97–18–17 (1)	Cleve Hawkins	NWS	10	Mar 19, 1915	Canadian A.C., Montreal, Quebec, Canada	
132	Win	96–18–17 (1)	Larry Williams	KO	5 (10)	Feb 26, 1915	Montreal, Quebec, Canada	
131	Win	95–18–17 (1)	Bill Tate	TKO	2 (10)	Feb 1, 1915	Vanderbilt A.C., New York City, New York, US	
130	Win	94–18–17 (1)	John Lester Johnson	NWS	10	Jan 11, 1915	Pioneer Sporting Club, New York City, New York, US	
129	Win	93–18–17 (1)	Bill Tate	NWS	10	Dec 14, 1914	Irving A.C., New York City, New York, US	
128	Draw	92–18–17 (1)	Battling Jim Johnson	PTS	12	Nov 10, 1914	Atlas A.A., Boston, Massachusetts, US	
127	Draw	92–18–16 (1)	Sam Langford	NWS	10	Oct 1, 1914	Stadium A.C., New York City, New York, US	
126	Win	92–18–15 (1)	Jim Kruger	KO	2 (?)	Sep 12, 1914	Martins Ferry, Ohio, US	
125	Win	91–18–15 (1)	Bill Tate	TKO	6 (10)	Aug 11, 1914	Rockaway Beach A.A., New York City, New York, US	
124	Win	90–18–15 (1)	Battling Jim Johnson	NWS	10	Aug 5, 1914	Stadium A.C., New York City, New York, US	
123	Win	89–18–15 (1)	Black Bill	TKO	9 (10)	Aug 1, 1914	Irving A.C., New York City, New York, US	
122	Win	88–18–15 (1)	Battling Jim Johnson	NWS	10	Jul 15, 1914	St. Nicholas Arena, New York City, New York, US	
121	Win	87–18–15 (1)	Battling Jim Johnson	NWS	10	Jul 1, 1914	St. Nicholas Arena, New York City, New York, US	
120	Win	86–18–15 (1)	Silas Green	TKO	3 (10)	Jun 16, 1914	Broadway S.C., New York City, New York, US	
119	Draw	85–18–15 (1)	Harry Wills	NWS	10	Jun 9, 1914	National Baseball Park, New Orleans, Louisiana, US	
118	Win	85–18–14 (1)	Colin Bell	PTS	20	May 4, 1914	Premierland, Whitechapel, London, England, U.K.	
117	Win	84–18–14 (1)	Kid Jackson	KO	7 (20)	May 2, 1914	Wonderland, Paris, France	
116	Win	83–18–14 (1)	Andy Johnson	KO	4 (?)	Apr 8, 1914	Liverpool Stadium, Liverpool, Merseyside, England, U.K.	
115	Win	82–18–14 (1)	Georges Carpentier	PTS	15	Mar 21, 1914	Luna Parc, Porte Maillot, Paris, France	
114	Win	81–18–14 (1)	Alf Langford	DQ	7 (20)	Feb 21, 1914	Wonderland, Paris, France	Langford threw a wild shot and fell over motionless. DQ by ref for suspected dive
113	Loss	80–18–14 (1)	Sam Langford	PTS	20	Dec 20, 1913	Luna Park Arena, Paris, France	For vacant world heavyweight title claim; As recognized by the French Boxing Federation
112	Win	80–17–14 (1)	Sam Langford	NWS	10	Oct 3, 1913	Madison Square Garden, New York City, New York, US	World colored heavyweight title at stake; (via KO only)
111	Win	79–17–14 (1)	John Lester Johnson	NWS	10	Jul 22, 1913	Atlantic Garden A.C., New York City, New York, US	
110	Win	78–17–14 (1)	Nat Dewey	PTS	10	Jul 4, 1913	Savannah, Georgia, US	
109	Draw	77–17–14 (1)	Harry Wills	PTS	10	Jul 1, 1913	Northside A.C., New Orleans, Louisiana, US	
108	Win	77–17–13 (1)	Al Benedict	TKO	3 (15)	Jun 27, 1913	Joplin, Missouri, US	
107	NC	76–17–13 (1)	Jeff Clark	NC	7 (8)	Jun 23, 1913	Phoenix A.C., Memphis, Tennessee, US	Fight was stopped by the referee as he felt Jennette wasn't trying for the KO
106	Win	76–17–13	Black Bill	NWS	10	May 21, 1913	Gowanus A.C., New York City, New York, US	
105	Win	75–17–13	George 'Kid' Cotton	KO	4 (6)	Apr 16, 1913	Olympia A.C., Philadelphia, Pennsylvania, US	
104	Win	74–17–13	Jack Reed	KO	3 (10)	Mar 17, 1913	Queensboro A.C., New York City, New York, US	
103	Win	73–17–13	Jack Reed	KO	3 (10)	Feb 10, 1913	Olympia Club, Hazleton, Pennsylvania, US	
102	Loss	72–17–13	Jack Thompson	PTS	?	Feb 2, 1913	United States of America	Exact date and location unknown
101	Win	72–16–13	Chuck Carleton	KO	1 (6)	Jan 24, 1913	Easton, Pennsylvania, US	
100	Win	71–16–13	Battling Jim Johnson	DQ	15 (?)	Jan 21, 1913	Providence, Rhode Island, US	
99	Win	70–16–13	Jeff Clark	NWS	10	Jan 17, 1913	Southwest A.C., Joplin, Missouri, US	
98	Win	69–16–13	Battling Jim Johnson	NWS	10	Jan 1, 1913	Irving A.C., New York City, New York, US	
97	Win	68–16–13	Chuck Carleton	TKO	2 (10)	Dec 6, 1912	National A.C., New York City, New York, US	
96	Win	67–16–13	George Christian	KO	8 (10)	Nov 27, 1912	Columbus, Ohio, US	
95	Win	66–16–13	Battling Jim Johnson	NWS	10	Oct 30, 1912	Forty-Fourth Street A.C., New York City, New York, US	
94	Win	65–16–13	Tony Ross	DQ	7 (10)	Sep 9, 1912	Madison Square Garden, New York City, New York, US	
93	Draw	64–16–13	Jeff Clark	NWS	6	Sep 2, 1912	Exposition Hall, Pittsburgh, Pennsylvania, US	
92	Win	64–16–12	Griff Jones	KO	2 (10)	Aug 30, 1912	Atlantic A.A., New York City, New York, US	
91	Win	63–16–12	Bill Tate	KO	2 (6)	Aug 20, 1912	Morris Park, Newark, New Jersey, US	
90	Win	62–16–12	Battling Brooks	KO	2 (?)	Aug 20, 1912	Morris Park, Newark, New Jersey, US	
89	Win	61–16–12	Jeff Madden	TKO	2 (10)	Aug 19, 1912	Madison Square Garden, New York City, New York, US	
88	Win	60–16–12	Young Hank Griffin	KO	3 (6)	Aug 9, 1912	Scranton, Pennsylvania, US	
87	Loss	59–16–12	Battling Jim Johnson	NWS	6	Jul 19, 1912	Olympia A.C., Philadelphia, Pennsylvania, US	
86	Win	59–15–12	Jeff Madden	TKO	4 (?)	Jul 15, 1912	New Bedford, Massachusetts, US	
85	Win	58–15–12	Mickey McDonough	TKO	2 (?)	Jul 15, 1912	New Bedford, Massachusetts, US	
84	Win	57–15–12	Black Bill	DQ	6 (10)	Jun 15, 1912	Royale A.C., New York City, New York, US	
83	Win	56–15–12	George Rodel	KO	11 (15)	May 24, 1912	Old Cosmo Rink, Plymouth, Devon, England, U.K.	
82	Win	55–15–12	Young Johnny Johnson	RTD	3 (10)	May 13, 1912	National AC, Glasgow, Scotland, U.K.	
81	Win	54–15–12	Black Bill	KO	3 (12)	Apr 4, 1912	Lewiston, Maine, US	
80	Win	53–15–12	Griff Jones	TKO	4 (10)	Apr 1, 1912	Olympia Boxing Club, New York City, New York, US	
79	Win	52–15–12	Nat Dewey	TKO	7 (10)	Mar 13, 1912	Long Acre A.A., New York City, New York, US	
78	Win	51–15–12	Andy Morris	TKO	6 (15)	Feb 27, 1912	Casino, New Haven, Connecticut, US	
77	Win	50–15–12	Morris Harris	NWS	3	Feb 19, 1912	American A.C., Philadelphia, Pennsylvania, US	
76	Win	49–15–12	Chuck Carleton	NWS	3	Feb 19, 1912	American A.C., Philadelphia, Pennsylvania, US	
75	Win	48–15–12	Griff Jones	TKO	3 (10)	Jan 19, 1912	Oneida County A.A., Utica, New York, US	
74	Win	47–15–12	Jack "Twin" Sullivan	NWS	10	Dec 26, 1911	Convention Hall, Buffalo, New York, US	
73	Win	46–15–12	Topeka Jack Johnson	KO	3 (?)	Dec 21, 1911	Louisiana A.C., New Orleans, Louisiana, US	
72	Win	45–15–12	Al Mitchell	KO	4 (?)	Dec 18, 1911	Memphis, Tennessee, US	
71	Win	44–15–12	Nat Dewey	PTS	8	Dec 15, 1911	Chattanooga, Tennessee, US	
70	Win	43–15–12	Young Jack Johnson	KO	4 (8)	Dec 11, 1911	Memphis, Tennessee, US	
69	Win	42–15–12	Jewey Smith	KO	3 (?)	Dec 7, 1911	Fordham A.C., New York City, New York, US	
68	Win	41–15–12	Bill Watkins	KO	1 (?)	Nov 30, 1911	German Hall, Albany, New York, US	
67	Loss	40–15–12	Sam Langford	NWS	10	Sep 5, 1911	Madison Square Garden, New York City, New York, US	World colored heavyweight title at stake; (via KO only)
66	Win	40–14–12	Porky Dan Flynn	NWS	10	Aug 29, 1911	Fairmont A.C., New York City, New York, US	
65	Win	39–14–12	Dummy Maxson	KO	1 (10)	Aug 23, 1911	Fairmont A.C., New York City, New York, US	
64	Draw	38–14–12	Tony Ross	NWS	10	Aug 1, 1911	20th Century A.C., New York City, New York, US	
63	Win	38–14–11	Al Kubiak	KO	3 (10)	Jul 25, 1911	20th Century A.C., New York City, New York, US	
62	Win	37–14–11	Al Kubiak	KO	9 (10)	Apr 20, 1911	National S.C., New York City, New York, US	
61	Win	36–14–11	Jim Barry	NWS	10	Mar 16, 1911	National S.C., New York City, New York, US	
60	Draw	35–14–11	Jim Barry	NWS	6	Feb 8, 1911	American A.C., Philadelphia, Pennsylvania, US	
59	Loss	35–14–10	Sam Langford	PTS	12	Jan 10, 1911	Armory A.A., Boston, Massachusetts, US	For world colored heavyweight title
58	Win	35–13–10	Jeff Clark	PTS	10	Dec 27, 1910	Central Institute, Newark, New Jersey, US	
57	Win	34–13–10	Black Bill	KO	5 (10)	Nov 10, 1910	Long Acre A.C., New York City, New York, US	
56	Win	33–13–10	Morris Harris	NWS	10	Sep 30, 1910	National A.C., New York City, New York, US	
55	Loss	32–13–10	Sam Langford	PTS	15	Sep 6, 1910	Armory A.A., Boston, Massachusetts, US	Lost world colored heavyweight title; For world colored heavyweight title claim
54	Draw	32–12–10	Morris Harris	NWS	10	Jul 1, 1910	National S.C., New York City, New York, US	
53	Win	32–12–9	Jim Smith	NWS	10	Jun 3, 1910	National S.C., New York City, New York, US	
52	Win	31–12–9	Andy Morris	TKO	3 (12)	May 24, 1910	Armory A.A., Boston, Massachusetts, US	
51	Draw	30–12–9	Sam McVea	PTS	30	Dec 11, 1909	Cirque d'Hiver, Paris, France	Retained world colored heavyweight title
50	Draw	30–12–8	Sid Russell	PTS	15	Nov 13, 1909	Wonderland, Paris, France	
49	Win	30–12–7	Al Kubiak	KO	10 (20)	Oct 30, 1909	Cirque de Paris, Paris, France	
48	Draw	29–12–7	Al Kubiak	NWS	6	Sep 18, 1909	National A.C., Philadelphia, Pennsylvania, US	
47	Win	29–12–6	Sandy Ferguson	TKO	8 (10)	Aug 27, 1909	Fairmont A.C., New York City, New York, US	
46	Loss	28–12–6	Sandy Ferguson	PTS	12	Jun 22, 1909	Armory A.C., Boston, Massachusetts, US	
45	Win	28–11–6	Trooper G. Cook	RTD	2 (6)	May 27, 1909	Arena, Villiers Street, Strand, London, England, U.K.	
44	Win	27–11–6	Harry Shearing	RTD	4 (6)	May 27, 1909	Arena, Villiers Street, Strand, London, England, U.K.	
43	Win	26–11–6	Sandy Ferguson	PTS	20	May 22, 1909	Cirque de Paris, Paris, France	
42	Win	25–11–6	Jack Scales	KO	1 (10)	May 1, 1909	Cirque d'Hiver, Paris, France	
41	Win	24–11–6	Sam McVea	RTD	49	Apr 17, 1909	Cirque de Paris, Paris, France	Won world colored heavyweight title; A fight to the finish
40	Loss	23–11–6	Sam McVea	PTS	20	Feb 20, 1909	Cirque de Paris, Paris, France	For vacant world colored heavyweight title
39	Win	23–10–6	Charley Croxon	TKO	2 (10)	Feb 6, 1909	Folies Bergère, Paris, France	
38	Win	22–10–6	Ben Taylor	KO	3 (?)	Jan 23, 1909	Folies Bergère, Paris, France	
37	Win	21–10–6	Morris Harris	NWS	6	Dec 7, 1908	West End A.C., Philadelphia, Pennsylvania, US	
36	Win	20–10–6	Sandy Ferguson	PTS	12	Sep 15, 1908	Armory, Boston, Massachusetts, US	
35	Draw	19–10–6	Sam Langford	NWS	6	Sep 1, 1908	National A.C., New York City, New York, US	
34	Draw	19–10–5	Jim Barry	NWS	6	May 8, 1908	Consolidated A.C., New York City, New York, US	
33	Win	19–10–4	Sam Campbell	TKO	6 (?)	Mar 9, 1908	Consolidated A.C., New York City, New York, US	
32	Draw	18–10–4	Sam Langford	PTS	12	Mar 3, 1908	Armory, Boston, Massachusetts, US	
31	Win	18–10–3	George Cole	TKO	4 (6)	Feb 17, 1908	Consolidated A.C., New York City, New York, US	
30	Win	17–10–3	Jim Jeffords	KO	2 (6)	Jan 27, 1908	Consolidated A.C., New York City, New York, US	
29	Win	16–10–3	Griff Jones	KO	3 (?)	Jan 13, 1908	Consolidated A.C., New York City, New York, US	
28	Win	15–10–3	Joe Phillips	KO	3 (6)	Jan 13, 1908	Consolidated A.C., New York City, New York, US	
27	Win	14–10–3	Morris Harris	TKO	4 (?)	Jun 11, 1907	Consolidated A.C., New York City, New York, US	
26	Win	13–10–3	Sam McVea	NWS	10	Apr 15, 1907	Lyric Hall, New York City, New York, US	
25	Win	12–10–3	Young Peter Jackson	NWS	6	Mar 8, 1907	Spring Garden A.C., Philadelphia, Pennsylvania, US	
24	Win	11–10–3	Jim Jeffords	KO	7 (10)	Feb 11, 1907	Casco A.C., Portland, Oregon, US	
23	Draw	10–10–3	Sam Langford	PTS	12	Jan 11, 1907	Unity Cycle Club, Lawrence, Massachusetts, US	
22	Draw	10–10–2	Jack Johnson	NWS	10	Nov 26, 1906	Auditorium, Portland, Oregon, US	World colored heavyweight title at stake; (via KO only)
21	Loss	10–10–1	Jack Johnson	NWS	6	Sep 20, 1906	Broadway A.C., Philadelphia, Pennsylvania, US	
20	Win	10–9–1	Black Bill	KO	4 (6)	Sep 6, 1906	Broadway A.C., Philadelphia, Pennsylvania, US	
19	Loss	9–9–1	Sam Langford	PTS	15	Apr 5, 1906	Lincoln A.C., Chelsea, Massachusetts, US	
18	Loss	9–8–1	Jack Johnson	PTS	15	Mar 14, 1906	Germania Maennerchor Hall, Baltimore, Maryland, US	For world colored heavyweight title
17	Loss	9–7–1	Jack Johnson	NWS	3	Jan 16, 1906	Sharkey A.C., New York City, New York, US	
16	Win	9–6–1	Sam Langford	TKO	8 (12)	Dec 25, 1905	Unity Cycle Club, Lawrence, Massachusetts, US	Langford retired after round 8
15	Win	8–6–1	Walter Johnson	TKO	2 (3)	Dec 21, 1905	Long Acre A.C., New York City, New York, US	
14	Loss	7–6–1	Jack Johnson	NWS	6	Dec 2, 1905	National A.C., Philadelphia, Pennsylvania, US	
13	Win	7–5–1	Jack Johnson	DQ	2 (6)	Nov 25, 1905	National A.C., Philadelphia, Pennsylvania, US	Jennette was winning the fight until he was fouled
12	Draw	6–5–1	Black Bill	PTS	6	Nov 2, 1905	National S.C., Wilmington, Delaware, US	
11	Win	6–5	George Cole	NWS	6	Oct 28, 1905	National A.C., Philadelphia, Pennsylvania, US	
10	Win	5–5	Jim Jeffords	NWS	6	Oct 26, 1905	Broadway A.C., Philadelphia, Pennsylvania, US	
9	Win	4–5	Black Bill	KO	7 (10)	Oct 11, 1905	National S.C., Wilmington, New Jersey, US	
8	Win	3–5	Pat O'Rourke	KO	5 (?)	Oct 7, 1905	North Bergen, New Jersey, US	
7	Win	2–5	George Cole	NWS	6	Aug 28, 1905	National A.C., Philadelphia, Pennsylvania, US	
6	Loss	1–5	George Cole	NWS	6	Jul 6, 1905	Broadway A.C., Philadelphia, Pennsylvania, US	
5	Win	1–4	Black Bill	NWS	6	Jun 8, 1905	Broadway A.C., Philadelphia, Pennsylvania, US	
4	Loss	0–4	Jack Johnson	NWS	3	May 9, 1905	Knickerbocker A.C., Philadelphia, Pennsylvania, US	
3	Loss	0–3	Black Bill	KO	2 (6)	Apr 20, 1905	Broadway A.C., Philadelphia, Pennsylvania, US	
2	Loss	0–2	Morris Harris	NWS	6	Mar 2, 1905	Broadway A.C., Philadelphia, Pennsylvania, US	
1	Loss	0–1	Morris Harris	NWS	6	Nov 11, 1904	Manhattan A.C., Philadelphia, Pennsylvania, US	

Awards and achievements
Preceded by Sam McVea	World Colored Heavyweight Champion; April 17 – September 6, 1909	Succeeded by Sam Langford
