= Jack Lester (boxer) =

American boxer (1891–1916)

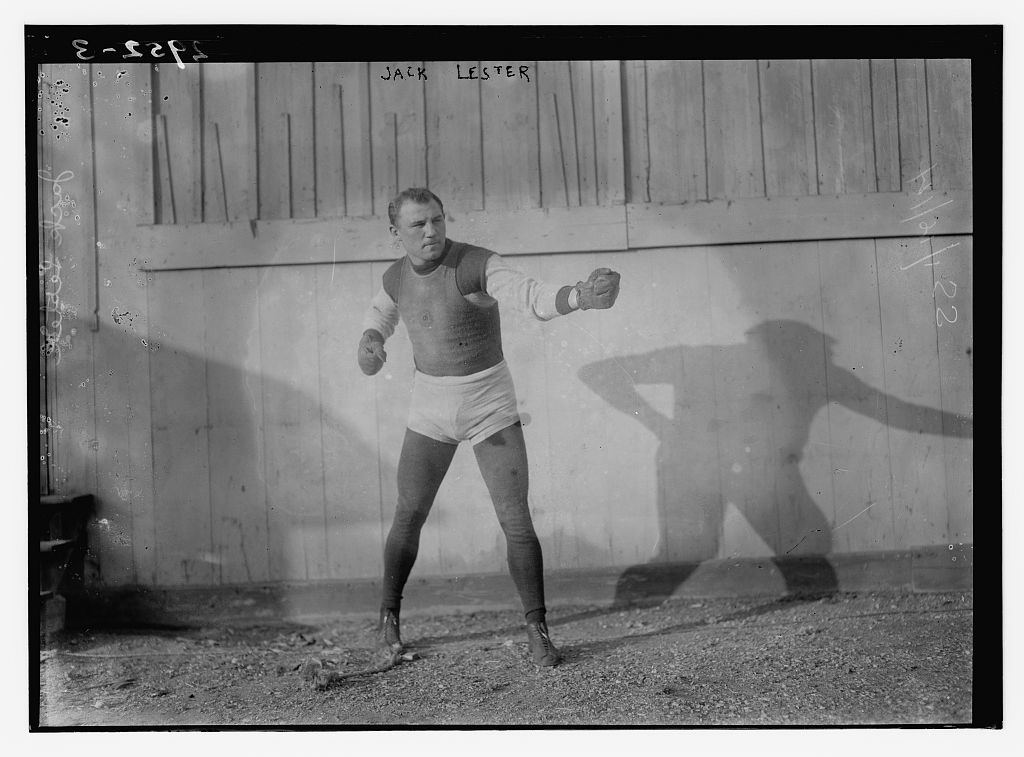

Personal information
- Nickname: Kid Lester
- Nationality: United States
- Born: Jack Jubeck; 2 May 1891 Calumet, Michigan
- Height: 5 ft 10 in (1.78 m)
- Weight: Heavyweight

Boxing career
- Reach: 72 in (183 cm)
- Stance: Orthodox

Boxing record
- Total fights: 54
- Wins: 26
- Win by KO: 19
- Losses: 18
- Draws: 4
- No contests: 6

Jack "Kid" Lester (2 May 1891 – 1916) was an American heavyweight boxer.

== Biography ==
He was born in Calumet, Michigan as Jack Jubeck on May 2, 1891, to Polish parents. He was raised in Cle Elum, Washington.

Lester's record was fairly unspectacular, though his knockout ratio in winning bouts was fairly high. His first manager was Harry Burns, but in 1910, ex-boxing champion Tommy Burns took Lester on. Tommy Burns sent Lester to Australia in 1911 to gain fight experience, and in September that year he beat Bill Lang, the Australian heavyweight champion, by points. While in Australia Lester and Burns's relationship became strained and Lester dropped Burns for Hugh MacIntosh. Lester spent the entirety of 1912 in Australia, but by March 1913 Lester was back in the States and fighting in California. Towards the end of his career he lost two matches to Light Heavyweight champion Jack Dillon.

He died in 1916 at the age of 26.

== Professional boxing record ==
Awards and achievements
Preceded by Bill Lang	Australian heavyweight Championship	Succeeded by Sam McVea
