= Bill Tate (boxer) =

American boxer

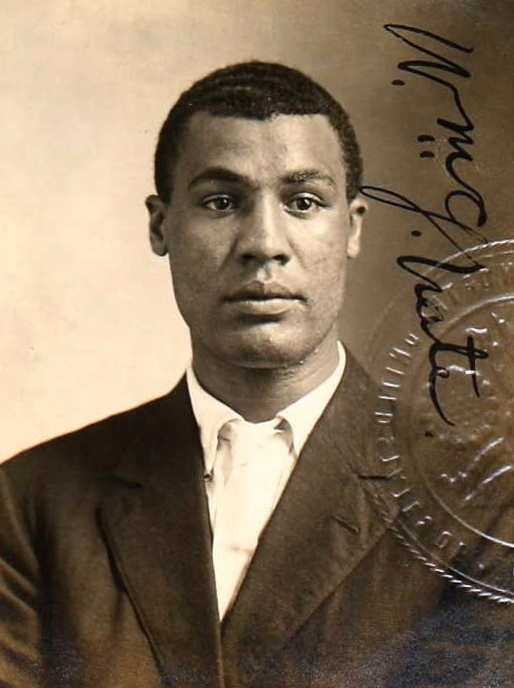
- Passport photo of Bill Tate from 1916

Personal information
- Nickname: Big Bill
- Born: William G. Tate; September 19, 1896 Montgomery, Alabama
- Died: August 10, 1953 (aged 56)
- Height: 6 ft 6.5 in (1.99 m)
- Weight: Heavyweight

Boxing career
- Stance: Orthodox

Boxing record
- Total fights: 50
- Wins: 27
- Win by KO: 22
- Losses: 19
- Draws: 2

Big Bill Tate (September 19, 1896 – August 10, 1953) was an American boxer who fought from 1912 to 1927. A native of Montgomery, Alabama, he spent his fighting career based in Chicago. Tate was a regular sparring partner of heavyweight champion Jack Dempsey, yet Dempsey denied him a shot at the title.

Tate graduated from Alabama's Normal School for Colored Students, a state-supported teacher's college for African Americans, in 1905. He reigned as the World Colored Heavyweight Champion from 25 January 1917, when he beat Sam Langford, to 25 May 1917, when Langford reclaimed the title.

== Boxing career ==
Tate's first professional bout was with former World Colored Heavyweight Champion Joe Jeanette on 20 August 1912 at Morris Park in Newark, New Jersey. He was knocked out in the 2nd round. He met Jeanette three more times in 1914–15, and lost all three bouts. On 11 June 1916, he fought Kid Norfolk in the Bull Ring in Panama City for the vacant Panamanian heavyweight title. Norfolk won by points in 20 rounds, reportedly giving Tate a beating.

=== World Colored Heavyweight Champion ===
After beating Rufe Cameron on October 16 of that year and losing a newspaper decision to former World Colored Heavyweight Champion Harry Wills on Armistice Day, he first fought Sam Langford, the man who had taken the title from Wills, on November 20 for the title in Syracuse, New York. In a 10-round bout, Langford was declared the winner by the Syracuse Herald while the Syracuse Post-Standard gave its newspaper decision to Tate. Langford was still recognized as the colored champ.

After beating Lou Bodie in Syracuse on 12 January 1917, thirteen days later, Tate met Langford for a rematch at the Grand Opera House in Kansas City, Missouri and won the title with a 12-round decision. His rein as Colored Heavyweight Champ was short-lived, a little more than four months, as Langford retook the title on May 1 at the Future City Athletic Club in St. Louis, Missouri, KO-ing Tate in the 5th round. In all, Tate fought Langford nine times from 1916 to 1922, winning four fights aside from their "split decision" in their first bout.

He fought three-time Colored Heavyweight Champion Harry Wills seven times, including twice in a four-day period in 1922. Tate lost their first bout, a 10-round fight held on November 11, 1916 at Brooklyn's Clermont Avenue Rink, by a newspaper decision. On 17 January 1921, at the Broadway Auditorium in Buffalo, New York, Tate challenged Wills for his colored heavyweight title but was KO-ed in the second round. On July 2 of that year, Tate again met Wills in a title bout held at Queensboro Stadium in Long Island City, Queens, New York, but lost by a technical knockout in the sixth.

After beating Sam Langford in Covington, Kentucky in a 12-round newspaper decision, he again met the colored champ Wills in a title match. On 8 December 1921, Wills outpointed Tate in a 12-round bout at Denver's Stockyards Stadium, retaining his title. Less than a month later, on 6 January 1922, they fought again, at the Arena in Milwaukie, Oregon.

In the first round of the scheduled 10-round fight, the referee disqualified Wills for throwing a punch that knocked down Tate down after the referee had called for a break. They agreed to meet again, and four days later, Wills drew with Tate on points in 10 rounds. Tate would later claim he won the fight the colored heavyweight title as he had knocked Wills down in ninth with a rabbit punch, but referee Tom Louttit did not give a count. Wills was recognized as the champ.

== Career record ==
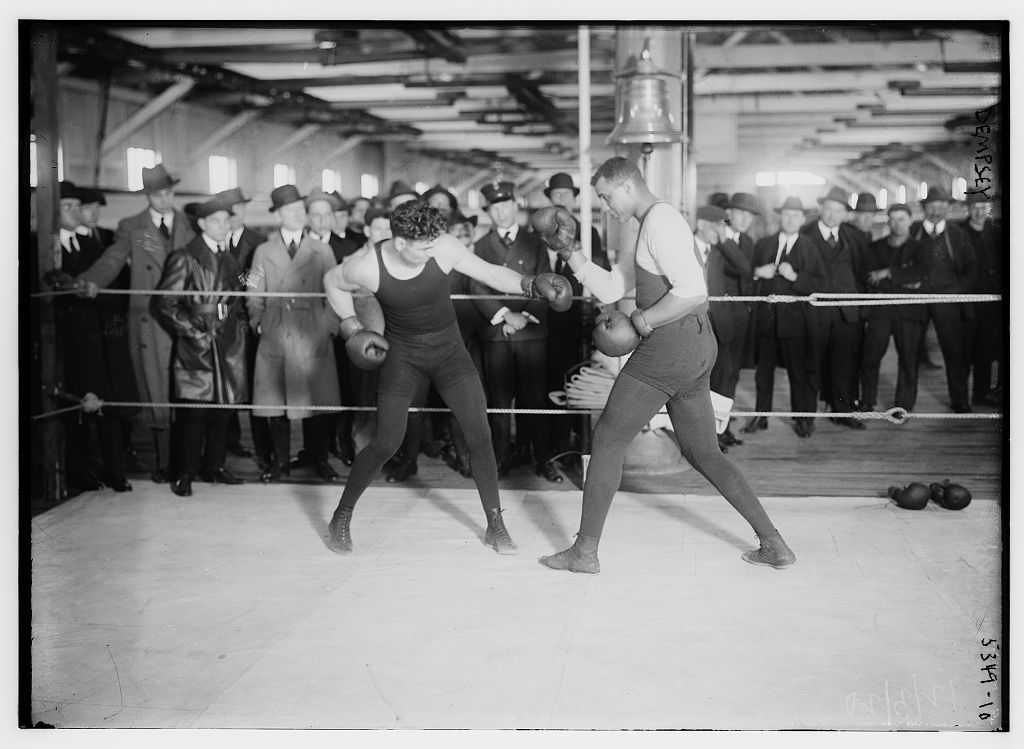
Tate (right) sparring with Jack Dempsey in 1920

Though he would fight Wills again as the top heavyweights were forced to fight each other due to the color bar, Tate never again fought for the colored title. Both he and Wills were hoping for a title shot from Dempsey, but neither got it.

In his 15-year career, the 6'6½″" tall Tate (who weighted at between 220 and 243 lbs.) compiled an official record of 27 wins (22 by knockout, 19 losses (knocked out 10 times) and 2 draws in 50 fights (the results of two fights with Sam McVea are unknown ). He also racked up 17 newspaper decisions, winning six, losing nine and drawing twice.

== Legacy & Honors ==
In 2020 award-winning author Mark Allen Baker published the first comprehensive account of The World Colored Heavyweight Championship, 1876-1937, with McFarland & Company, a leading independent publisher of academic & nonfiction books. This history traces the advent and demise of the Championship, the stories of the talented professional athletes who won it, and the demarcation of the color line both in and out of the ring.

For decades the World Colored Heavyweight Championship was a useful tool to combat racial oppression-the existence of the title a leverage mechanism, or tool, used as a technique to counter a social element, “drawing the color line.”

Awards and achievements
Preceded by Sam Langford	World Colored Heavyweight Champion; January 25 – May 2, 1917	Succeeded by Sam Langford
