= Dennis Haugh =

Irish boxer (1883–1959)

Personal information
- Nationality: Irish
- Born: 1883 Kilnaneave, County Tipperary, Ireland
- Died: 1959 (aged 75–76) London, England
- Height: 5 ft 10 in (178 cm)
- Weight: 175 lb (79 kg)

Boxing career

Boxing record
- Total fights: 46
- Wins: 24
- Win by KO: 12
- Losses: 18
- Draws: 4

Dennis Haugh (1883–1959) was an Irish boxer who was a former Irish Middleweight and Irish Light-Heavyweight Champion.

== Biography ==
Born in Kilnaneave, County Tipperary in 1883, Haugh gained his early boxing experience while serving in the armed forces. His first recorded professional fights were on 30 March 1909, winning two fights on the same day.

On 19 January 1914, he defeated the former British amateur heavyweight champion Dick Smith on points. However, Haugh lost to Smith in a rematch on 9 March 1914 in a 20-round points decision, where he continued to box despite breaking his left forearm in the 9th round. The winner of this bout received the newly created Lonsdale Belt.

Haugh boxed professionally until 1916. He continued to box in military contests, and fought in the finals of the Humber Garrison contests in October 1918.

Dennis died in 1959 in London, England.

His nephew John Haugh won All-Ireland Senior Hurling titles with Tipperary in 1951, 1958 and 1961.

== See also ==
- List of British light-heavyweight boxing champions
