= Sam McVey =

American boxer

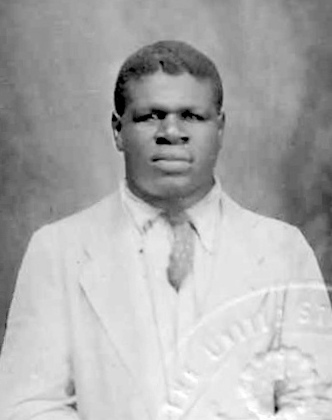
- Passport photo of McVey from 1919

Personal information
- Nickname: The Black Bison of the Boulevard
- Born: Samuel E. McVea; May 17, 1884 Waelder, Texas, US
- Died: December 23, 1921 (aged 37) New York City, US
- Height: 5 ft 10.5 in (1.79 m)
- Weight: Heavyweight

Boxing career
- Reach: 75 in (191 cm)
- Stance: Orthodox

Boxing record
- Total fights: 112 (including newspaper decisions)
- Wins: 78
- Win by KO: 60
- Losses: 18
- Draws: 13
- No contests: 3

Samuel E. MacVea (May 17, 1884 – December 23, 1921), better known as Sam McVey, was an American Hall of Fame heavyweight boxer during the early 20th century. Famously known as the "Oxnard Cyclone", he ranked alongside Jack Johnson, Joe Jeanette, Sam Langford, and Harry Wills, some of the best heavyweights of their time. All of them, except Johnson, were denied a shot at the world heavyweight championship due to the color bar, which was ironically maintained by Johnson when he became the first black to win the world heavyweight in spotlight. Despite being denied a title shot, Sam enjoyed the famed career that took him across the globe.

In 96 documented fights in at least 10 different countries, McVey only lost 16 bouts. His greatest wins include two victories over both Sam Langford and Harry Wills, which won him the World Colored Heavyweight Championship on two occasions, respectively. In his later, years he worked as a trainer and sparring partner for both black and white fighters training for important bouts.

== Biography ==
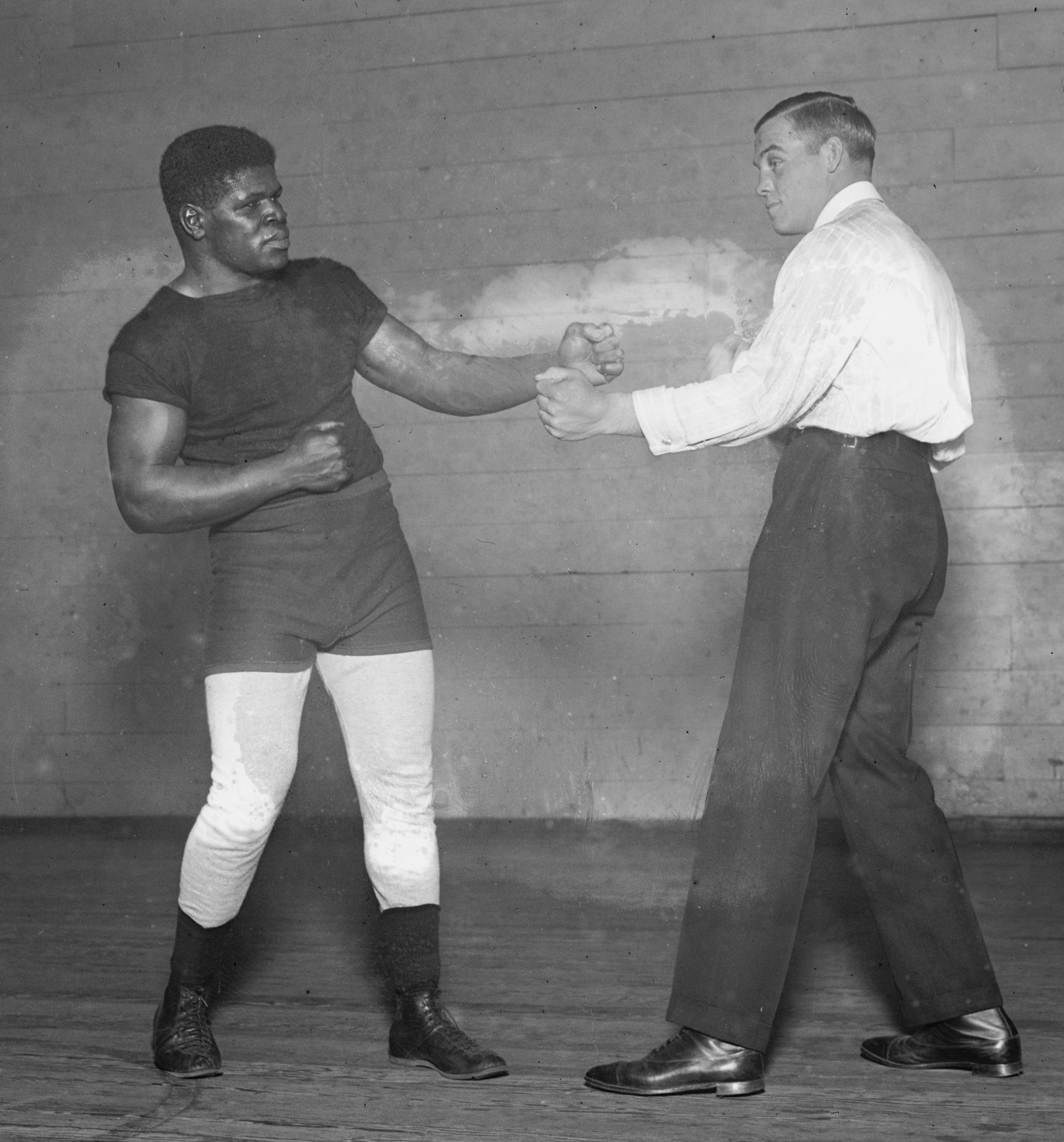
McVey (left) posing with fellow boxer Al Reich

Fighting out of Oxnard, California, McVey stood 5′10½″ inches tall and fought at a weight of between 205 and 220 lbs. He relied more on brute strength than finesse in the ring. His first pro fight listed on BoxRec took place in 1902 at the age of 18, but a newspaper from 1902, on his then-upcoming fight with Jack Fogarty, lists five earlier fights he won in Australia, and a further two that took place in California. However In those days, few mixed-race fights took place, so McVey frequently fought the other top black boxers of his time, including Sam Langford (15 times), Joe Jeanette (5 times), Harry Wills (5 times), and Jack Johnson (3 times). Overall, McVey's boxing record was 65 wins, 16 losses, and 12 draws.

McVey spent much of his prime years fighting overseas. He left for Paris in 1907 and fought there for four years. McVey left Paris in 1911 for Australia. He fought there for three more years before finally returning to the U.S.

On December 31, 1908 in Paris, Sam McVey competed in a mixed style bout against jujutsu expert Tano Matsuda, knocking him out in ten seconds. In the earlier part of this century, such bouts were occasionally held in Japan pitting western boxers against judo or jujutsu fighters.

On April 17, 1909, in Paris, Sam McVey fought Joe Jeanette in a bout considered one of the greatest and certainly one of the longest of the 20th century. The fight went 50 rounds and lasted three and a half hours. McVey was generally agreed to be winning through most of the fight, particularly the 21st and 22nd round, knocking Jeanette down repeatedly. By the 40th round, however, Jeanette had recovered while McVey was lagging and knocked down repeatedly. Ultimately McVey's eyes had swollen shut and he was forced to quit.

In 1912, McVey was one of the contenders for the World Colored Heavyweight Championship fought at various venues across Australia. His opponent Sam Langford was a Black Canadian popularly known as the Boston Tar Baby, and reputedly one of the greatest fighters of all time, beating champions in the lightweight to heavyweight classes. Before the matches, the boxers gave demonstrations of their skill. Before his beating, Sam McVea in the Exhibition Rink Buildings in Perth, Sam Langford stayed at the Nedlands Park Hotel where he:

gave exhibitions of punching the ball, throwing the medicine bag sparring, etc. His work was a revelation. Langford allowed his sparring partners to hit him just when and where they pleased. After witnessing his exhibition of wonderful foot and head work one could easily understand how the big-little fellow came to lay low the best boxers in the world. Langford is as fast on his feet and as graceful as a ballet-dancer. He carries a punch like unto that of a kick of a mule, and is practically impervious to punishment. Dick Cullen hit him some terrific punches on the chin last Wednesday - punches that would have put the ordinary boxer away for the full count; but the Tar Baby only grinned and shoved out his head for more. He is truly a remarkable fighter.

McVey contracted pneumonia and died December 23, 1921, in New York City, penniless while still an active fighter. His burial was paid for by Jack Johnson. His headstone was paid by Ben Hawes. A special ceremony was conducted by Daryl George at Mt. Olivet cemetery in Queens, NY.

== Legacy & honors ==
In 2020 award-winning author Mark Allen Baker published the first comprehensive account of The World Colored Heavyweight Championship, 1876-1937, with McFarland & Company, a leading independent publisher of academic & nonfiction books. This history traces the advent and demise of the Championship, the stories of the talented professional athletes who won it, and the demarcation of the color line both in and out of the ring.

For decades the World Colored Heavyweight Championship was a useful tool to combat racial oppression-the existence of the title a leverage mechanism, or tool, used as a technique to counter a social element, “drawing the color line.”

McVey was inducted into the International Boxing Hall of Fame in 1999.

== Professional boxing record ==
All information in this section is derived from BoxRec, unless otherwise stated.

=== Official record ===
112 fights	74 wins	14 losses
By knockout	60	5
By decision	13	9
By disqualification	1	0
Draws	10	
No contests	3	
Newspaper decisions/draws	11	

All newspaper decisions are officially regarded as “no decision” bouts and are not counted to the win/loss/draw column.

No.	Result	Record	Opponent	Type	Round, time	Date	Location	Notes
112	Draw	74–14–10 (14)	Jeff Clark	NWS	10	Aug 1, 1921	Rossmere Park, Lancaster, Pennsylvania, US	
111	Win	74–14–10 (13)	Jeff Clark	NWS	10	Jul 7, 1921	Atlantic City, New Jersey, US	
110	Win	74–14–10 (12)	Jeff Clark	PTS	12	Mar 21, 1921	Columbus, Ohio, US	
109	NC	73–14–10 (12)	Jack Thompson	NC	6 (10)	Mar 18, 1921	Moose Temple, Detroit, Michigan, US	McVea was hit with body blows. He held excessively, so the referee declared a no contest
108	NC	73–14–10 (11)	Harry Wills	NC	6 (8)	Sep 8, 1920	Ice Palace, Philadelphia, US	World colored heavyweight title at stake; Fight stopped for "stalling"
107	Win	73–14–10 (10)	Jack Ward	KO	2 (10)	Sep 1, 1920	Auditorium, Atlanta, Georgia, US	
106	Loss	72–14–10 (10)	Sam Langford	NWS	10	Aug 14, 1920	East Chicago, Indiana, US	
105	Loss	72–14–10 (9)	Pinky Lewis	PTS	10	Aug 5, 1920	Tulsa, Oklahoma, US	
104	Win	72–13–10 (9)	Clem Johnson	KO	4 (15)	Dec 15, 1918	Plaza de Toros Vista Alegre, Panama City, Panama	
103	Draw	71–13–10 (9)	Jack Livingstone	PTS	10	Sep 14, 1918	Broadway Theater, Colon City, Panama	
102	Loss	71–13–9 (9)	Harry Wills	PTS	20	Jun 16, 1918	Plaza de Toros Vista Alegre, Panama City, Panama	
101	Loss	71–12–9 (9)	Harry Wills	KO	5 (20)	Feb 17, 1918	Plaza de Toros Vista Alegre, Panama City, Panama	
100	Win	71–11–9 (9)	Battling Jim Johnson	PTS	25	Oct 14, 1917	Broadway Theater, Colon City, Panama	
99	Win	70–11–9 (9)	Battling Jim Johnson	PTS	20	Aug 12, 1917	Plaza de Toros Vista Alegre, Panama City, Panama	Fought outside in heavy rain
98	Win	69–11–9 (9)	Jeff Clark	TKO	15 (20)	Jul 15, 1917	Plaza de Toros Vista Alegre, Panama City, Panama	
97	Win	68–11–9 (9)	Jeff Clark	PTS	20	May 13, 1917	Plaza de Toros Vista Alegre, Panama City, Panama	
96	Win	67–11–9 (9)	Jim Barry	TKO	7 (20)	Mar 11, 1917	Plaza de Toros Vista Alegre, Panama City, Panama	
95	Win	66–11–9 (9)	Jim Briggs	KO	2 (10)	Jan 27, 1917	Santa Ana Plaza, Panama City, Panama	
94	Win	65–11–9 (9)	Fitz Brathwaite	KO	1 (10)	Jan 27, 1917	Santa Ana Plaza, Panama City, Panama	
93	Win	64–11–9 (9)	Jack Livingstone	KO	5 (15)	Jan 14, 1917	Garden Theater, Colon City, Panama	
92	Win	63–11–9 (9)	Bob Devere	PTS	10	Sep 20, 1916	Santiago de Chile, Chile	
91	Draw	62–11–9 (9)	Bob Devere	PTS	20	Sep 3, 1916	Santiago de Chile, Chile	
90	Draw	62–11–8 (9)	Sam Langford	PTS	20	Aug 12, 1916	Teatro Roma, Avellaneda, Argentina	For world colored heavyweight title
89	Draw	62–11–7 (9)	Sam Langford	NWS	12	May 2, 1916	East Market St. Rink, Akron, Ohio, US	World colored heavyweight title at stake; (via KO only)
88	Loss	62–11–7 (8)	Jack Thompson	PTS	8	Apr 14, 1916	Future City A.C., Saint Louis, Missouri, US	
87	Loss	62–10–7 (8)	Sam Langford	NWS	10	Apr 7, 1916	Arena, Syracuse, New York, US	World colored heavyweight title at stake; (via KO only)
86	Loss	62–10–7 (7)	Sam Langford	NWS	10	Feb 17, 1916	Madison Square Garden, New York City, New York, US	
85	Draw	62–10–7 (6)	Sam Langford	NWS	10	Oct 23, 1915	American A.C., New York City, New York, US	
84	Win	62–10–7 (5)	Jeff Clark	PTS	10	Oct 15, 1915	North Side A.C., Kansas City, Missouri, US	
83	Draw	61–10–7 (5)	Sam Langford	PTS	20	Sep 30, 1915	Stockyards Stadium, Denver, Colorado, US	
82	Loss	61–10–6 (5)	Harry Wills	PTS	12	Sep 7, 1915	Atlas A.A., Boston, Massachusetts, US	Lost world colored heavyweight title
81	Win	61–9–6 (5)	Sandy Ferguson	KO	8 (12)	Aug 10, 1915	Atlas A.A., Boston, Massachusetts, US	
80	Win	60–9–6 (5)	Sam Langford	PTS	12	Jun 29, 1915	Atlas A.A., Boston, Massachusetts, US	Won world colored heavyweight title
79	Win	59–9–6 (5)	Battling Jim Johnson	NWS	10	Jun 9, 1915	Gayety Theatre, Montreal, Quebec, Canada	
78	Win	59–9–6 (4)	Harry Wills	NWS	10	May 19, 1915	St. Nicholas Arena, New York City, New York, US	
77	Draw	59–9–6 (3)	Joe Jennette	PTS	12	Apr 27, 1915	Atlas A.A., Boston, Massachusetts, US	For world colored heavyweight title
76	Win	59–9–5 (3)	Battling Jim Johnson	PTS	20	Feb 20, 1915	Havana, Cuba	
75	Win	58–9–5 (3)	Harry Wills	PTS	20	Dec 20, 1914	McDonoghville Park, New Orleans, Louisiana, US	
74	Win	57–9–5 (3)	Battling Jim Johnson	NWS	10	Dec 10, 1914	Fairmont A.C., New York City, New York, US	
73	Win	57–9–5 (2)	Arthur Pelkey	KO	4 (20)	Jun 13, 1914	Baker's Pavilion, Melbourne, Australia	
72	Win	56–9–5 (2)	Colin Bell	KO	2 (20)	Dec 27, 1913	Olympia A.C. Newtown, Sydney, Australia	
71	Win	55–9–5 (2)	Professor Stevenson	KO	5 (10)	Nov 6, 1913	Rink Hall, Lismore, Australia	
70	Win	54–9–5 (2)	Colin Bell	TKO	16 (20)	Apr 19, 1913	National Arena, Adelaide, Australia	Won South Australia State heavyweight titles
69	Draw	53–9–5 (2)	Sam Langford	PTS	20	Mar 24, 1913	Olympic Stadium, Brisbane, Australia	For world colored heavyweight titles
68	Loss	53–9–4 (2)	Sam Langford	KO	13 (20)	Dec 26, 1912	Sydney Stadium, Sydney, Australia	For Australian and world colored heavyweight titles
67	Loss	53–8–4 (2)	Sam Langford	TKO	11 (20)	Oct 9, 1912	Exhibition Stadium, Perth, Australia	For Australian and world colored heavyweight titles; McVey claimed a foul. This was not allowed and he refused to continue
66	Loss	53–7–4 (2)	Sam Langford	PTS	20	Aug 3, 1912	Sydney Stadium, Sydney, Australia	For Australian and world colored heavyweight titles
65	Loss	53–6–4 (2)	Sam Langford	PTS	20	Apr 8, 1912	Sydney Stadium, Sydney, Australia	Lost Australian and world colored heavyweight titles
64	Win	53–5–4 (2)	Jim Barry	PTS	20	Mar 16, 1912	Sydney Stadium, Sydney, Australia	
63	Win	52–5–4 (2)	Sam Langford	PTS	20	Dec 26, 1911	Sydney Stadium, Sydney, Australia	Retained Australian heavyweight title; Won world colored heavyweight title
62	Win	51–5–4 (2)	Jack Lester	TKO	8 (20)	Dec 11, 1911	Olympic Stadium, Brisbane, Australia	Retained Australian heavyweight title
61	Win	50–5–4 (2)	Bill Lang	KO	2 (20)	Oct 28, 1911	Sydney Stadium, Sydney, Australia	Retained Australian heavyweight title
60	Win	49–5–4 (2)	Jack Lester	PTS	20	Sep 30, 1911	Sydney Stadium, Sydney, Australia	Won Australian heavyweight title
59	Win	48–5–4 (2)	Alf Langford	KO	9 (15)	Aug 3, 1911	Artillery Drill Hall, Sheffield, England, UK	
58	Win	47–5–4 (2)	George Rodel	KO	1 (20)	Jul 20, 1911	Liverpool Stadium, Pudsey Street, Liverpool, England, UK	
57	Win	46–5–4 (2)	Andrew Dixon	KO	4 (20)	May 25, 1911	Cirque-Théâtre, Angers, France	
56	Draw	45–5–4 (2)	Sam Langford	PTS	20	Apr 1, 1911	Cirque de Paris, Paris, France	For world colored heavyweight title
55	Win	45–5–3 (2)	Charley Harris	KO	3 (?)	Feb 25, 1911	Apollo-Cirque, Nancy, France	
54	Win	44–5–3 (2)	Seaman Fred Parsons	KO	1 (15)	Jan 14, 1911	Bâtiment Électoral, Geneva, Switzerland	
53	Win	43–5–3 (2)	Battling Jim Johnson	KO	21 (25)	Nov 19, 1910	Luna Park Skating Rink, Paris, France	
52	Win	42–5–3 (2)	Sergeant Sunshine	KO	1 (?)	Oct 22, 1910	Hippodrome, Paris, Belgium	
51	Win	41–5–3 (2)	Peter Rice	TKO	3 (?)	Oct 17, 1910	Brussels Rinking, Brussels, Belgium	
50	Draw	40–5–3 (2)	Battling Jim Johnson	PTS	15	Aug 7, 1910	Neuilly-sur-Seine, France	
49	Win	40–5–2 (2)	Peter Rice	KO	4 (?)	Jul 22, 1910	Salle de la Pépinière, Paris, France	
48	Win	39–5–2 (2)	Joe Grim	TKO	13 (20)	Jun 25, 1910	Hippodrome, Paris, France	
47	Win	38–5–2 (2)	Jim Stewart	TKO	6 (25)	Apr 16, 1910	Cirque de Paris, Paris, France	
46	Win	37–5–2 (2)	Arthur Bennett	KO	4 (25)	Apr 13, 1910	Apollo-Cirque, Nancy, France	
45	Win	36–5–2 (2)	Herbert Sinnott	KO	5	Mar 25, 1910	Grand-Théâtre, Saint-Etienne, France	A fight to the finish
44	Win	35–5–2 (2)	Al Kubiak	KO	10 (20)	Feb 26, 1910	Wonderland, Paris, France	
43	Win	34–5–2 (2)	Fred Drummond	KO	5 (?)	Jan 27, 1910	Le Havre, France	
42	Draw	33–5–2 (2)	Joe Jennette	PTS	30	Dec 11, 1909	Cirque d'Hiver, Paris, France	For world colored heavyweight title
41	Win	33–5–1 (2)	Fred Drummond	KO	7 (20)	Jul 4, 1909	Praça de Touros do Campo Pequeno, Lisbon, Portugal	
40	Win	32–5–1 (2)	Jim Barry	DQ	15 (20)	Jun 26, 1909	Cirque de Paris, Paris, France	
39	Win	31–5–1 (2)	Bill Harris	KO	5	May 30, 1909	Arènes du Rond-Point du Prado, Marseille, France	A fight to the finish
38	Win	30–5–1 (2)	Fred Drummond	KO	5 (20)	Apr 24, 1909	Nouveau Cirque, Orléans, France	
37	Loss	29–5–1 (2)	Joe Jennette	RTD	49 (?)	Apr 17, 1909	Cirque de Paris, Paris, France	Lost world colored heavyweight title
36	Win	29–4–1 (2)	'Cyclone' Billy Warren	KO	2 (?)	Apr 9, 1909	Tivoli Boxing-Hall, Paris, France	Retained world colored heavyweight title
35	Win	28–4–1 (2)	Joe Jennette	PTS	20	Feb 20, 1909	Salle des Fêtes, Roubaix, France	Won vacant world colored heavyweight title
34	Win	27–4–1 (2)	Herbert Sinnott	KO	5 (15)	Feb 5, 1909	Salle des Fêtes, Roubaix, France	
33	Win	26–4–1 (2)	Bill Rickard	KO	1 (?), 0:06	Jan 23, 1909	Folies Bergère, Paris, France	
32	Draw	25–4–1 (2)	Fred Drummond	PTS	?	Dec 18, 1908	Théâtre de l'Eldorado, Montpellier, France	
31	NC	25–4 (2)	Fred Drummond	NC	? (?)	Dec 17, 1908	Théâtre de l'Eldorado, Montpellier, France	
30	Win	25–4 (1)	Camerlings	TKO	1 (?)	Nov 18, 1908	Scala, Brussels, Belgium	
29	Win	24–4 (1)	Herbert Sinnott	KO	5 (20)	Nov 14, 1908	Hippodrome, Paris, France	
28	Win	23–4 (1)	Guionnet	TKO	3 (?)	Oct 14, 1908	Bordeaux, France	
27	Win	22–4 (1)	Harry Shearing	KO	1 (?)	Sep 19, 1908	Paris, France	
26	Win	21–4 (1)	Fred Drummond	KO	4 (15)	Jul 18, 1908	Scala, Oostende, Belgium	
25	Win	20–4 (1)	Charlie Wilson	KO	3 (20)	Jul 12, 1908	Velodrome du Karreveld, Molenbeek-Saint-Jean, Belgium	
24	Win	19–4 (1)	Georges Rampazzi	KO	3 (?)	Jul 1, 1908	Biarritz, France	Exact date unknown
23	Win	18–4 (1)	Jewey Smith	KO	3 (20)	May 23, 1908	Porte Maillot, Paris, France	
22	Win	17–4 (1)	Ben Taylor	KO	11 (15)	Apr 15, 1908	Hippodrome, Paris, France	
21	Win	16–4 (1)	Harry Shearing	TKO	5 (?)	Feb 15, 1908	Neuilly Bowling Palace, Paris, France	
20	Win	15–4 (1)	Jack Scales	KO	2 (15)	Dec 28, 1907	Salle Wagram, Paris, France	
19	Win	14–4 (1)	Marc Gaucher	KO	4 (?)	Oct 24, 1907	Folies Bergère, Paris, France	
18	Win	13–4 (1)	Ben Taylor	KO	3 (10)	Jun 3, 1907	National Sporting Club, Covent Garden, London, England, UK	
17	Loss	12–4 (1)	Joe Jennette	NWS	10	Apr 15, 1907	Lyric Hall, New York City, New York, US	
16	Win	12–4	Denver Ed Martin	KO	16 (20)	Feb 28, 1907	Old Pavilion, Sacramento, California, US	
15	Win	11–4	Sailor Matt Turner	KO	2 (20), 1:15	Nov 29, 1906	Farragut Theater, Vallejo, California, US	
14	Win	10–4	Tornado Smith	KO	1 (?)	Feb 24, 1906	Bakersfield, California, US	
13	Win	9–4	Denver Ed Martin	KO	4 (20)	Jan 25, 1906	National A.C., San Diego, California, US	
12	Loss	8–4	Denver Ed Martin	PTS	10	Aug 12, 1904	Hazard's Pavilion, Los Angeles, California, US	
11	Loss	8–3	Jack Johnson	KO	20 (20)	Apr 22, 1904	Mechanic's Pavilion, San Francisco, California, US	For world colored heavyweight title
10	Loss	8–2	Jack Johnson	PTS	20	Oct 27, 1903	Hazard's Pavilion, Los Angeles, California, US	For world colored heavyweight title
9	Win	8–1	Denver Ed Martin	KO	1 (20), 2:37	Sep 15, 1903	Hazard's Pavilion, Los Angeles, California, US	
8	Win	7–1	Kid Carter	KO	11 (20)	May 5, 1903	Hazard's Pavilion, Los Angeles, California, US	
7	Loss	6–1	Jack Johnson	PTS	20	Feb 26, 1903	Hazard's Pavilion, Los Angeles, California, US	For world colored heavyweight title
6	Win	6–0	Jack Kid Lavalle	KO	1 (10), 0:30	Jan 31, 1903	Oxnard, California, US	
5	Win	5–0	Jim 'Toothpick' Kelly	KO	4 (?)	Jan 6, 1903	Hazard's Pavilion, Los Angeles, California, US	
4	Win	4–0	Fred Russell	KO	5 (20)	Nov 1, 1902	Auditorium, Oxnard, California, US	
3	Win	3–0	Jack Fogarty	KO	5 (?)	Oct 9, 1902	Oxnard, California, US	
2	Win	2–0	Herb McKell	KO	3 (?)	Jun 19, 1902	Pioneer Hall, Oxnard, California, US	
1	Win	1–0	George Sullivan	KO	6 (20)	Apr 12, 1902	Auditorium, Oxnard, California, US	

=== Unofficial record ===
112 fights	78 wins	18 losses
By knockout	60	5
By decision	17	13
By disqualification	1	0
Draws	13	
No contests	3	

Record with the inclusion of newspaper decisions to the win/loss/draw column.

No.	Result	Record	Opponent	Type	Round	Date	Location	Notes
112	Draw	78–18–13 (3)	Jeff Clark	NWS	10	Aug 1, 1921	Rossmere Park, Lancaster, Pennsylvania, US	
111	Win	78–18–12 (3)	Jeff Clark	NWS	10	Jul 7, 1921	Atlantic City, New Jersey, US	
110	Win	77–18–12 (3)	Jeff Clark	PTS	12	Mar 21, 1921	Columbus, Ohio, US	
109	NC	76–18–12 (3)	Jack Thompson	NC	6 (10)	Mar 18, 1921	Moose Temple, Detroit, Michigan, US	McVea was hit with body blows. He held excessively, so the referee declared a no contest
108	NC	76–18–12 (2)	Harry Wills	NC	6 (8)	Sep 8, 1920	Ice Palace, Philadelphia, US	World colored heavyweight title at stake; Fight stopped for "stalling"
107	Win	76–18–12 (1)	Jack Ward	KO	2 (10)	Sep 1, 1920	Auditorium, Atlanta, Georgia, US	
106	Loss	75–18–12 (1)	Sam Langford	NWS	10	Aug 14, 1920	East Chicago, Indiana, US	
105	Loss	75–17–12 (1)	Pinky Lewis	PTS	10	Aug 5, 1920	Tulsa, Oklahoma, US	
104	Win	75–16–12 (1)	Clem Johnson	KO	4 (15)	Dec 15, 1918	Plaza de Toros Vista Alegre, Panama City, Panama	
103	Draw	74–16–12 (1)	Jack Livingstone	PTS	10	Sep 14, 1918	Broadway Theater, Colon City, Panama	
102	Loss	74–16–11 (1)	Harry Wills	PTS	20	Jun 16, 1918	Plaza de Toros Vista Alegre, Panama City, Panama	
101	Loss	74–15–11 (1)	Harry Wills	KO	5 (20)	Feb 17, 1918	Plaza de Toros Vista Alegre, Panama City, Panama	
100	Win	74–14–11 (1)	Battling Jim Johnson	PTS	25	Oct 14, 1917	Broadway Theater, Colon City, Panama	
99	Win	73–14–11 (1)	Battling Jim Johnson	PTS	20	Aug 12, 1917	Plaza de Toros Vista Alegre, Panama City, Panama	Fought outside in heavy rain
98	Win	72–14–11 (1)	Jeff Clark	TKO	15 (20)	Jul 15, 1917	Plaza de Toros Vista Alegre, Panama City, Panama	
97	Win	71–14–11 (1)	Jeff Clark	PTS	20	May 13, 1917	Plaza de Toros Vista Alegre, Panama City, Panama	
96	Win	70–14–11 (1)	Jim Barry	TKO	7 (20)	Mar 11, 1917	Plaza de Toros Vista Alegre, Panama City, Panama	
95	Win	69–14–11 (1)	Jim Briggs	KO	2 (10)	Jan 27, 1917	Santa Ana Plaza, Panama City, Panama	
94	Win	68–14–11 (1)	Fitz Brathwaite	KO	1 (10)	Jan 27, 1917	Santa Ana Plaza, Panama City, Panama	
93	Win	67–14–11 (1)	Jack Livingstone	KO	5 (15)	Jan 14, 1917	Garden Theater, Colon City, Panama	
92	Win	66–14–11 (1)	Bob Devere	PTS	10	Sep 20, 1916	Santiago de Chile, Chile	
91	Draw	65–14–11 (1)	Bob Devere	PTS	20	Sep 3, 1916	Santiago de Chile, Chile	
90	Draw	65–14–10 (1)	Sam Langford	PTS	20	Aug 12, 1916	Teatro Roma, Avellaneda, Argentina	For world colored heavyweight title
89	Draw	65–14–9 (1)	Sam Langford	NWS	12	May 2, 1916	East Market St. Rink, Akron, Ohio, US	World colored heavyweight title at stake; (via KO only)
88	Loss	65–14–8 (1)	Jack Thompson	PTS	8	Apr 14, 1916	Future City A.C., Saint Louis, Missouri, US	
87	Loss	65–13–8 (1)	Sam Langford	NWS	10	Apr 7, 1916	Arena, Syracuse, New York, US	World colored heavyweight title at stake; (via KO only)
86	Loss	65–12–8 (1)	Sam Langford	NWS	10	Feb 17, 1916	Madison Square Garden, New York City, New York, US	
85	Draw	65–11–8 (1)	Sam Langford	NWS	10	Oct 23, 1915	American A.C., New York City, New York, US	
84	Win	65–11–7 (1)	Jeff Clark	PTS	10	Oct 15, 1915	North Side A.C., Kansas City, Missouri, US	
83	Draw	64–11–7 (1)	Sam Langford	PTS	20	Sep 30, 1915	Stockyards Stadium, Denver, Colorado, US	
82	Loss	64–11–6 (1)	Harry Wills	PTS	12	Sep 7, 1915	Atlas A.A., Boston, Massachusetts, US	Lost world colored heavyweight title
81	Win	64–10–6 (1)	Sam Langford	KO	8 (12)	Aug 10, 1915	Atlas A.A., Boston, Massachusetts, US	
80	Win	63–10–6 (1)	Sam Langford	PTS	12	Jun 29, 1915	Atlas A.A., Boston, Massachusetts, US	Won world colored heavyweight title
79	Win	62–10–6 (1)	Battling Jim Johnson	NWS	10	Jun 9, 1915	Gayety Theatre, Montreal, Quebec, Canada	
78	Win	61–10–6 (1)	Harry Wills	NWS	10	May 19, 1915	St. Nicholas Arena, New York City, New York, US	
77	Draw	60–10–6 (1)	Joe Jennette	PTS	12	Apr 27, 1915	Atlas A.A., Boston, Massachusetts, US	For world colored heavyweight title
76	Win	60–10–5 (1)	Battling Jim Johnson	PTS	20	Feb 20, 1915	Havana, Cuba	
75	Win	59–10–5 (1)	Harry Wills	PTS	20	Dec 20, 1914	McDonoghville Park, New Orleans, Louisiana, US	
74	Win	58–10–5 (1)	Battling Jim Johnson	NWS	10	Dec 10, 1914	Fairmont A.C., New York City, New York, US	
73	Win	57–10–5 (1)	Arthur Pelkey	KO	4 (20)	Jun 13, 1914	Baker's Pavilion, Melbourne, Australia	
72	Win	56–10–5 (1)	Colin Bell	KO	2 (20)	Dec 27, 1913	Olympia A.C. Newtown, Sydney, Australia	
71	Win	55–10–5 (1)	Professor Stevenson	KO	5 (10)	Nov 6, 1913	Rink Hall, Lismore, Australia	
70	Win	54–10–5 (1)	Colin Bell	TKO	16 (20)	Apr 19, 1913	National Arena, Adelaide, Australia	Won South Australia State heavyweight titles
69	Draw	53–10–5 (1)	Sam Langford	PTS	20	Mar 24, 1913	Olympic Stadium, Brisbane, Australia	For world colored heavyweight titles
68	Loss	53–10–4 (1)	Sam Langford	KO	13 (20)	Dec 26, 1912	Sydney Stadium, Sydney, Australia	For Australian and world colored heavyweight titles
67	Loss	53–9–4 (1)	Sam Langford	TKO	11 (20)	Oct 9, 1912	Exhibition Stadium, Perth, Australia	For Australian and world colored heavyweight titles; McVey claimed a foul. This was not allowed and he refused to continue
66	Loss	53–8–4 (1)	Sam Langford	PTS	20	Aug 3, 1912	Sydney Stadium, Sydney, Australia	For Australian and world colored heavyweight titles
65	Loss	53–7–4 (1)	Sam Langford	PTS	20	Apr 8, 1912	Sydney Stadium, Sydney, Australia	Lost Australian and world colored heavyweight titles
64	Win	53–6–4 (1)	Jim Barry	PTS	20	Mar 16, 1912	Sydney Stadium, Sydney, Australia	
63	Win	52–6–4 (1)	Sam Langford	PTS	20	Dec 26, 1911	Sydney Stadium, Sydney, Australia	Retained Australian heavyweight title; Won world colored heavyweight title
62	Win	51–6–4 (1)	Jack Lester	TKO	8 (20)	Dec 11, 1911	Olympic Stadium, Brisbane, Australia	Retained Australian heavyweight title
61	Win	50–6–4 (1)	Bill Lang	KO	2 (20)	Oct 28, 1911	Sydney Stadium, Sydney, Australia	Retained Australian heavyweight title
60	Win	49–6–4 (1)	Jack Lester	PTS	20	Sep 30, 1911	Sydney Stadium, Sydney, Australia	Won Australian heavyweight title
59	Win	48–6–4 (1)	Alf Langford	KO	9 (15)	Aug 3, 1911	Artillery Drill Hall, Sheffield, England, UK	
58	Win	47–6–4 (1)	George Rodel	KO	1 (20)	Jul 20, 1911	Liverpool Stadium, Pudsey Street, Liverpool, England, UK	
57	Win	46–6–4 (1)	Andrew Dixon	KO	4 (20)	May 25, 1911	Cirque-Théâtre, Angers, France	
56	Draw	45–6–4 (1)	Sam Langford	PTS	20	Apr 1, 1911	Cirque de Paris, Paris, France	For world colored heavyweight title
55	Win	45–6–3 (1)	Charley Harris	KO	3 (?)	Feb 25, 1911	Apollo-Cirque, Nancy, France	
54	Win	44–6–3 (1)	Seaman Fred Parsons	KO	1 (15)	Jan 14, 1911	Bâtiment Électoral, Geneva, Switzerland	
53	Win	43–6–3 (1)	Battling Jim Johnson	KO	21 (25)	Nov 19, 1910	Luna Park Skating Rink, Paris, France	
52	Win	42–6–3 (1)	Sergeant Sunshine	KO	1 (?)	Oct 22, 1910	Hippodrome, Paris, Belgium	
51	Win	41–6–3 (1)	Peter Rice	TKO	3 (?)	Oct 17, 1910	Brussels Rinking, Brussels, Belgium	
50	Draw	40–6–3 (1)	Battling Jim Johnson	PTS	15	Aug 7, 1910	Neuilly-sur-Seine, France	
49	Win	40–6–2 (1)	Peter Rice	KO	4 (?)	Jul 22, 1910	Salle de la Pépinière, Paris, France	
48	Win	39–6–2 (1)	Joe Grim	TKO	13 (20)	Jun 25, 1910	Hippodrome, Paris, France	
47	Win	38–6–2 (1)	Jim Stewart	TKO	6 (25)	Apr 16, 1910	Cirque de Paris, Paris, France	
46	Win	37–6–2 (1)	Arthur Bennett	KO	4 (25)	Apr 13, 1910	Apollo-Cirque, Nancy, France	
45	Win	36–6–2 (1)	Herbert Sinnott	KO	5	Mar 25, 1910	Grand-Théâtre, Saint-Etienne, France	A fight to the finish
44	Win	35–6–2 (1)	Al Kubiak	KO	10 (20)	Feb 26, 1910	Wonderland, Paris, France	
43	Win	34–6–2 (1)	Fred Drummond	KO	5 (?)	Jan 27, 1910	Le Havre, France	
42	Draw	33–6–2 (1)	Joe Jennette	PTS	30	Dec 11, 1909	Cirque d'Hiver, Paris, France	For world colored heavyweight title
41	Win	33–6–1 (1)	Fred Drummond	KO	7 (20)	Jul 4, 1909	Praça de Touros do Campo Pequeno, Lisbon, Portugal	
40	Win	32–6–1 (1)	Jim Barry	DQ	15 (20)	Jun 26, 1909	Cirque de Paris, Paris, France	
39	Win	31–6–1 (1)	Bill Harris	KO	5	May 30, 1909	Arènes du Rond-Point du Prado, Marseille, France	A fight to the finish
38	Win	30–6–1 (1)	Fred Drummond	KO	5 (20)	Apr 24, 1909	Nouveau Cirque, Orléans, France	
37	Loss	29–6–1 (1)	Joe Jennette	RTD	49 (?)	Apr 17, 1909	Cirque de Paris, Paris, France	Lost world colored heavyweight title
36	Win	29–5–1 (1)	'Cyclone' Billy Warren	KO	2 (?)	Apr 9, 1909	Tivoli Boxing-Hall, Paris, France	Retained world colored heavyweight title
35	Win	28–5–1 (1)	Joe Jennette	PTS	20	Feb 20, 1909	Salle des Fêtes, Roubaix, France	Won vacant world colored heavyweight title
34	Win	27–5–1 (1)	Herbert Sinnott	KO	5 (15)	Feb 5, 1909	Salle des Fêtes, Roubaix, France	
33	Win	26–5–1 (1)	Bill Rickard	KO	1 (?), 0:06	Jan 23, 1909	Folies Bergère, Paris, France	
32	Draw	25–5–1 (1)	Fred Drummond	PTS	?	Dec 18, 1908	Théâtre de l'Eldorado, Montpellier, France	
31	NC	25–5 (1)	Fred Drummond	NC	? (?)	Dec 17, 1908	Théâtre de l'Eldorado, Montpellier, France	
30	Win	25–5	Camerlings	TKO	1 (?)	Nov 18, 1908	Scala, Brussels, Belgium	
29	Win	24–5	Herbert Sinnott	KO	5 (20)	Nov 14, 1908	Hippodrome, Paris, France	
28	Win	23–5	Guionnet	TKO	3 (?)	Oct 14, 1908	Bordeaux, France	
27	Win	22–5	Harry Shearing	KO	1 (?)	Sep 19, 1908	Paris, France	
26	Win	21–5	Fred Drummond	KO	4 (15)	Jul 18, 1908	Scala, Oostende, Belgium	
25	Win	20–5	Charlie Wilson	KO	3 (20)	Jul 12, 1908	Velodrome du Karreveld, Sint-Jans-Molenbeek, Belgium	
24	Win	19–5	Georges Rampazzi	KO	3 (?)	Jul 1, 1908	Biarritz, France	Exact date unknown
23	Win	18–5	Jewey Smith	KO	3 (20)	May 23, 1908	Porte Maillot, Paris, France	
22	Win	17–5	Ben Taylor	KO	11 (15)	Apr 15, 1908	Hippodrome, Paris, France	
21	Win	16–5	Harry Shearing	TKO	5 (?)	Feb 15, 1908	Neuilly Bowling Palace, Paris, France	
20	Win	15–5	Jack Scales	KO	2 (15)	Dec 28, 1907	Salle Wagram, Paris, France	
19	Win	14–5	Marc Gaucher	KO	4 (?)	Oct 24, 1907	Folies Bergère, Paris, France	
18	Win	13–5	Ben Taylor	KO	3 (10)	Jun 3, 1907	National Sporting Club, Covent Garden, London, England, UK	
17	Loss	12–5	Joe Jennette	NWS	10	Apr 15, 1907	Lyric Hall, New York City, New York, US	
16	Win	12–4	Denver Ed Martin	KO	16 (20)	Feb 28, 1907	Old Pavilion, Sacramento, California, US	
15	Win	11–4	Sailor Matt Turner	KO	2 (20), 1:15	Nov 29, 1906	Farragut Theater, Vallejo, California, US	
14	Win	10–4	Tornado Smith	KO	1 (?)	Feb 24, 1906	Bakersfield, California, US	
13	Win	9–4	Denver Ed Martin	KO	4 (20)	Jan 25, 1906	National A.C., San Diego, California, US	
12	Loss	8–4	Denver Ed Martin	PTS	10	Aug 12, 1904	Hazard's Pavilion, Los Angeles, California, US	
11	Loss	8–3	Jack Johnson	KO	20 (20)	Apr 22, 1904	Mechanic's Pavilion, San Francisco, California, US	For world colored heavyweight title
10	Loss	8–2	Jack Johnson	PTS	20	Oct 27, 1903	Hazard's Pavilion, Los Angeles, California, US	For world colored heavyweight title
9	Win	8–1	Denver Ed Martin	KO	1 (20), 2:37	Sep 15, 1903	Hazard's Pavilion, Los Angeles, California, US	
8	Win	7–1	Kid Carter	KO	11 (20)	May 5, 1903	Hazard's Pavilion, Los Angeles, California, US	
7	Loss	6–1	Jack Johnson	PTS	20	Feb 26, 1903	Hazard's Pavilion, Los Angeles, California, US	For world colored heavyweight title
6	Win	6–0	Jack Kid Lavalle	KO	1 (10), 0:30	Jan 31, 1903	Oxnard, California, US	
5	Win	5–0	Jim 'Toothpick' Kelly	KO	4 (?)	Jan 6, 1903	Hazard's Pavilion, Los Angeles, California, US	
4	Win	4–0	Fred Russell	KO	5 (20)	Nov 1, 1902	Auditorium, Oxnard, California, US	
3	Win	3–0	Jack Fogarty	KO	5 (?)	Oct 9, 1902	Oxnard, California, US	
2	Win	2–0	Herb McKell	KO	3 (?)	Jun 19, 1902	Pioneer Hall, Oxnard, California, US	
1	Win	1–0	George Sullivan	KO	6 (20)	Apr 12, 1902	Auditorium, Oxnard, California, US	

Awards and achievements
Preceded by Jack Johnson (Vacated)	World Colored Heavyweight Champion; February 20, 1909 – April 17, 1909	Succeeded by Larry Gains
Preceded by Sam Langford	World Colored Heavyweight Champion; December 26, 1911 – April 8, 1912	Succeeded by Sam Langford
