= Estridge =

Estridge is a surname, and may refer to:

- Brian Estridge, sports broadcaster
- Chris Estridge (born 1989), American soccer player
- Edward Estridge (1843–1919), English cricketer
- George Estridge (1835–1862), English cricketer
- Henry Estridge (1837–1902), English cricketer
- Larry Estridge (born 1902), St. Kitts middleweight boxer
- Philip Don Estridge (1937–1985), developer of the IBM Personal Computer
- Robin Estridge (1920–2002), British author of suspense fiction and screenwriter
