= Panama Joe Gans =

Barbados boxer

- Gans circa 1920s

Personal information
- Born: Cyril Quinton Jr. 14 November 1896 Colony of Barbados, British West Indies; Settled in New York in 1917
- Died: Unknown Date
- Height: 5 ft 7 in (1.70 m)
- Weight: Welterweight; Middleweight

Boxing career
- Stance: Orthodox

Boxing record
- Total fights: 134
- Wins: 90
- Win by KO: 43
- Losses: 31
- Draws: 11
- No contests: 2

Panama Joe Gans was a black boxer who held the World Colored Middleweight Championship for four years, shortly before it was discontinued. Born Cyril Quinton Jr. on 14 November 1896, in Barbados, British West Indies and raised in the Panama Canal Zone, the 5'7" Quinton originally fought out of Panama and then New York City. He took his ringname from boxing great Joe Gans, the first black American fighter to win a world boxing title. He found his greatest fame fighting as a middleweight at between 147 and 160 lbs, but in his early career he took the Panamanian Lightweight Title and contended for the Panamanian Welterweight Title at weights roughly between 130 and 147 pounds.

== Early life ==
Panama Joe Gans was born Cyril Quinton Jr. on 4 November 1896, on the small tropical Island of Barbados. His family moved to Colon, Panama while he was still a child. After his father died when he was very young, he was detained by local authorities for stealing fish and spent the next five years in a detention center. At the center, he learned the basic aspects of boxing by partaking in bouts organized by his classmates. Under the guidance of H.R. Cambridge, a local Panamanian business manager, and real estate developer, Quinton adopted his ring name, and became a successful boxer in the Canal Zone where he fought his first thirty fights with considerable success.

== Taking the Panamanian Light and Middleweight Championships ==
On 10 October 1915, Panama Joe first won the Lightweight Championship of Panama at only eighteen against Young Sam Langford at the Pacific Theatre in Panama City in a twenty-round points decision. He later took the Middleweight Championship of Panama by knocking out Benny McGovern in the third of fifteen rounds on 30 November 1916, at the Santa Ana Plaza in Panama City. At the time, these titles were often described as extending to both Central and South America.

In his first bout after taking the Middleweight Championship of Panama on 12 December 1916, though barely twenty-one years old, he soundly defeated Abraham Jacob Hollandersky, a former holder of the Panamanian Heavyweight Championship in 20 rounds in Panama City.

=== Moving to New York in 1917 ===
In 1917, Panama Joe was brought to New York by the talented boxing manager Leo P. Flynn, and settled in Harlem. Some of his important early victories were against the Jamaica Kid, Cleve Hawkins and Battling Thomas.

==== Wins that brought attention to Gans, 1919–20 ====
Gans had an important early career win against Jeff Smith on 8 July 1919, in an eight-round newspaper decision of the Philadelphia Inquirer at Atlantic City. On 23 October 1919, he made a very strong showing against well known boxer Bert Kenney in an eight-round newspaper decision in Atlantic City, New Jersey. Kenney had been an opponent of Jack Dempsey in 1916. On 24 May 1920, Gans made a splash in the boxing world by knocking out Young Fisher in the fifth round at Rochester, New York. On 15 June of that year, Gans would defeat Fisher again in a ten-round newspaper decision. Rather than acting as a lever to gain access to more lucrative opponents, several boxing historians wrote than these wins, and Gans' exceptional record may have made it more difficult for him to sign for a bout with a white Middleweight championship contender.

==== Serving as a sparring partner for Jack Dempsey, 1920 ====
Gans worked as a sparring partner for Jack Dempsey prior to his a bout with future Hall of Fame boxer Billy Miske in early September 1920. The speed and skill he demonstrated in his fast sparring matches with Dempsey won him attention with the press, and the boxing public. The publicity he gained helped him secure a shot at the Colored World Middleweight Championship.

== World Colored Middleweight Title, October 1920 ==
George Robinson

Panama Joe won the World Colored Middleweight Championship from Bostonian George Robinson in Madison Square Garden on 8 October 1920, in a twelve-round points decision. Panama Joe weighed 151 and Robinson weighed 150, in the light middleweight range. It was the first time two black boxers were featured on a fight card at the Garden, though typical of the era, the coverage of the fight was brief in those few newspapers that covered it. The fighting was described as fierce and drawing blood by one source.

=== World Colored Middleweight defense, December 1920 ===
On 19 December 1920, Panama Joe defeated Sailor Darden in a ten-round points decision for the Colored World Middleweight Championship title at New York's Madison Square Garden. Darden was a sailor who had been released by the Navy from his service on the USS Charleston. One key to Gans' victory may have been the ten pound weight advantage he had at 149 1/2 pounds, as Darden put up an exceptionally strong fight. After the fight, manager Tex Rickard presented Panama Joe with a diamond studded belt signifying his possession of the Colored Middleweight Title. Gans had some trouble in the first, but had a stronger showing in the subsequent nine rounds. Though the bout was technically a world championship, the crowd was described as small. Darden made many of his points with blows to the body of Gans.

In a twelve-round newspaper decision by the Pittsburgh Post on 6 December 1921, Gans defeated Allentown Joe Gans at McGuigan Arena in Harrison, New Jersey.

=== Contracting pneumonia, 1921 ===
In January 1921, Panama Joe contracted pneumonia, affecting his long-term career ambitions. In 1920 he had won all of his fights, showing his mastery of the boxing world, and his potential as a true World Middleweight Champion.

In September and October 1921, Panama Joe would lose to Sailor Darden in New York in fifteen round points decisions.

In a non-title fight on 28 November 1921, Gans impressively defeated Joe Borell at the arena in Trenton, New Jersey in a ninth-round technical knockout. Borrell had been a powerful puncher in his earlier days, with twenty-four career knockouts. In his career he faced future Heavyweight champion Gene Tunney, Middleweight champions Harry Greb, and Al McCoy, and former World Welterweight Champion Harry Lewis.

=== Knockout win over Jack Blackburn, July 1922 ===
Panama Joe defeated black Kentuckian boxer Jack Blackburn at Tomlinson Hall On 24 July 1922, in Indianapolis, Indiana in a fourth-round knockout. Gans had come from the West Coast where he won two four round bouts in Oakland against Frank Barrieau and Frankie Denny. Blackburn was fighting one of the last matches of his career and was 40 at the time of the bout, ancient for a highly rated boxer, even in 1922. He had a three-inch advantage in reach and height, but it did not compensate for his age and declining stamina. Blackburn had fought many of the greatest boxers of his era, including Sam Langford, Kid Norfolk, and champions Joe Gans, Harry Greb, Harry Lewis, and Mike Twin Sullivan.

On 17 February 1923, Panama Joe defeated Jimmy O'Gatty in a fifth-round knockout at the Commonwealth Sporting Club in New York City.

=== Defenses of the Colored World Middleweight Championship ===
Gans defended the Colored Middleweight Title three times in 1923. He won a ten-round newspaper decision against Whitey Black on 14 May in Detroit. Meeting Black again on 22 October 1923, he knocked him out in Rochester, New York in the eighth of a scheduled non-title ten round bout, but the fight was investigated as neither man appeared to have landed a telling blow in the bout, and Black had been warned against not putting up a serious fight.

==== Bouts with future World Champion Tiger Flowers, 1921–23 ====
Panama Joe fought Tiger Flowers in Toledo, Ohio, on 25 May 1923, in a twelve-round, no-decision bout, in which the Toledo News Bee reported that Flowers seemed to have had an edge in every round, but Gans' World Middleweight Title was not at stake as Ohio did not allow decisions. Flowers had a three-inch reach advantage over Gans, and may have fought with a weight advantage in the bout as well. Even though Gans had beaten Flowers twice previously, Gans' manager, Leo Flynn refused to have Panama Joe meet Flowers for a fourth time, though the purse offered was very large. The Atlanta Constitution noted that Flowers had "badly beaten" Panama Joe in their May bout.

===== Win over future World Champion Tiger Flowers, 1921 =====
Impressively, on 8 August 1921, Panama Joe knocked out Flowers in the sixth round at the Auditorium in Atlanta, Georgia. Famed sportswriter Damon Runyon noted prior to the fight that Panama Joe had a better claim to the Middleweight Title than two of the primary white contenders, Bostonian Italian Johnny Wilson, who first took the title in 1920, and Bryan Downey, who contended for the title once in July 1921 against Wilson. On 15 December 1921, Gans had decisively beaten Flowers in a fifth-round knockout at the Auditorium in Atlanta, Georgia. These were impressive wins as Flowers would become the first African American to hold the World Middleweight Championship in 1926.

At 149 1/2 pounds, on 18 November 1922, Gans defeated Jewish New York boxer Marty Cross before a large crowd in twelve rounds at the Commonwealth Sports Club in the Bronx in a twelve-round points decision. Cross had a three-inch reach advantage over Gans. He was a brother of the great lightweight boxer Leach Cross. Gans was the winner on points in every round, but in the ninth he was nearly knocked out by a single punch to the midsection. Gans recovered from the blow and came back strongly in the following round, continuing to press his advantage and bringing Cross close to a knockout. Gans had promised to forfeit his Middleweight Championship bout if he lost the fight.

On 30 May 1923, Panama Joe defeated well known competitor Willie Walker in New York in a ninth-round knockout.

==== Win over Italian Joe Gans, 1923 ====
On 15 September 1923, Panama Joe Gans defeated quality competitor Italian Joe Gans before a crowd that packed the Commonwealth Sporting Club in New York in an important twelve round points decision. Panama Joe was the aggressor and appeared to outpoint Italian Joe in each of the fast rounds. In the late rounds, Italian Joe swung wide of his mark and could not penetrate the defense of Panama Joe. Panama Joe had previously lost to Gans on 6 February 1923, in a twelve-round points decision at New York's Pioneer Sporting Club.

=== Contracting pneumonia again, December 1923 ===
Around late December 1923, after a loss to Morrie Sclaiffer in Omaha, Nebraska, Panama Joe disastrously contracted pneumonia for a second time. Doctors strongly discouraged him from continuing his boxing, and he was bed-ridden for two months. Gans took only a four-month period of recuperation before resuming a career as a competitor, though he would never again compete on the world stage. His loss of the Colored title to Larry Estridge only six months later was likely a result of the endurance he had lost to his illness.

=== Win over Andy "Kid" Palmer ===
Gans defeated Andy "Kid" Palmer in their first meeting on 6 January 1923, in a twelve-round points decision at New York's Commonwealth Sporting Club. They had met earlier on 27 October 1922, in the feature bout at Brooklyn's Rink Sporting Club. Gans had been uncharacteristically disqualified for a low blow in the sixth round, after having been warned twice previously for hitting low. Gans had started well in the first few rounds, but subsequently took a beating from the short jabs of Palmer.

=== Losing the Colored World Middleweight Championship, June 1924 ===
Only six months after his second battle with pneumonia, Panama Joe lost his title to Larry Estridge in a decisive ten round unanimous decision at Yankee Stadium in the Bronx on 26 June 1924. Panama Joe was floored three times in the bout, and was cut by the swinging jabs of his southpaw challenger. Gans was down by the second round, and may have been woozy in the remaining eight, where he gamely took a serious battering, but fought on. Estridge was twenty-two to Panama Joe's twenty-eight years and had a six-pound weight advantage which may have played a factor in the bout.

Estridge successfully defended the title in a rematch with Gans at Queensboro Stadium in Long Island City, Queens, New York on 11 August 1924, before a crowd of 16,000. Panama Joe once again took a battering in the match. It was Estridge's sole title defense. The title went into abeyance after Tiger Flowers became the first black boxer to win the world middleweight championship when he defeated Harry Greb in 1926.

According to BoxRec, Panama Joe's last recorded fight was at Balboa Stadium in Mayaguez, Puerto Rico against Francisco Soler on 10 June 1928. Panama Joe lost the ten round bout.

Panama Joe's professional boxing career extended for a period of roughly fifteen years. Little has been published about his later life or his death.

== Professional boxing record ==
All information in this section is derived from BoxRec, unless otherwise stated.

=== Official record ===
136 fights	74 wins	20 losses
By knockout	45	1
By decision	28	15
By disqualification	1	4
Draws	7	
No contests	2	
Newspaper decisions/draws	33	

All newspaper decisions are officially regarded as "no decision" bouts and are not counted in the win/loss/draw column.

No.	Result	Record	Opponent	Type	Round	Date	Location	Notes
136	Loss	74–20–7 (35)	Francisco Soler	PTS	10	10 Jun 1928	Balboa Stadium, Mayaguez, Puerto Rico	
135	Draw	74–19–7 (35)	Alejandro Villanueva	PTS	10	29 Apr 1928	Victory Garden Stadium, San Juan, Puerto Rico	
134	Loss	74–19–6 (35)	Rafael Plata	PTS	10	2 Mar 1928	San Juan Stadium, San Juan, Puerto Rico	
133	Win	74–18–6 (35)	Frank Baldi	TKO	6 (10)	10 Feb 1928	Victory Garden Stadium, San Juan, Puerto Rico	
132	Loss	73–18–6 (35)	Vincent Forgione	NWS	8	30 May 1927	Waltz Dream Arena, Atlantic City, New Jersey, US	
131	Loss	73–18–6 (34)	Homer Robertson	PTS	10	1 Jan 1927	Crescent Rink, Lowell, Massachusetts, US	
130	Draw	73–17–6 (34)	Willie Ptomey	PTS	10	22 May 1926	Commonwealth Sporting Club, New York City, New York, US	
129	Win	73–17–5 (34)	Martin Perez	KO	6 (12)	27 Mar 1926	Arena Colon, Havana, Cuba	
128	Loss	72–17–5 (34)	Esteban Gallard	PTS	12	6 Mar 1926	Arena Colon, Havana, Cuba	
127	Loss	72–16–5 (34)	Harry Martone	NWS	12	12 Oct 1925	Laurel Garden, Newark, New Jersey, US	
126	Loss	72–16–5 (33)	Georgie Levine	PTS	12	1 Aug 1925	Commonwealth Sporting Club, New York City, New York, US	
125	Win	72–15–5 (33)	Young Harry Wills	KO	7 (12)	14 Feb 1925	Plaza de Toros Vista Alegre, Panama City	
124	Win	71–15–5 (33)	Lefty Michaels	TKO	4 (12)	30 Nov 1924	Central American Stadium, Colon City, Panama	
123	Loss	70–15–5 (33)	Eliseo Quintana	DQ	2 (12)	25 Oct 1924	Rose Gardens Stadium, Kingston, Jamaica	Gans DQ'd for kayoing Quintana with a kidney punch
122	Loss	70–14–5 (33)	Larry Estridge	PTS	10	11 Aug 1924	Queensboro Stadium, New York City, New York, US	For world colored middleweight title
121	Loss	70–13–5 (33)	Larry Estridge	UD	10	26 Jun 1924	Yankee Stadium, New York City, New York, US	Lost world colored middleweight title
120	Draw	70–12–5 (33)	Tillie Herman	NWS	10	16 Jun 1924	Open-air Arena, East Chicago, Indiana, US	
119	Win	70–12–5 (32)	Jack Palmer	KO	8 (12)	26 Apr 1924	Commonwealth Sporting Club, New York City, New York, US	
118	Loss	69–12–5 (32)	Morrie Schlaifer	PTS	10	17 Dec 1923	Omaha, Nebraska, US	
117	Win	69–11–5 (32)	Danny Fagan	KO	8 (12)	12 Dec 1923	Commonwealth Sporting Club, New York City, New York, US	
116	Loss	68–11–5 (32)	Jock Malone	NWS	10	9 Nov 1923	Auditorium, Saint Paul, Minnesota, US	
115	Win	68–11–5 (31)	Whitey Black	KO	8 (12)	22 Oct 1923	Convention Hall, Rochester, New York, US	
114	Win	67–11–5 (31)	Italian Joe Gans	PTS	12	15 Sep 1923	Commonwealth Sporting Club, New York City, New York, US	
113	Loss	66–11–5 (31)	Lou Bogash	PTS	10	1 Aug 1923	Velodrome, New York City, New York, US	
112	Win	66–10–5 (31)	Willie Walker	KO	9 (12)	30 Jun 1923	Commonwealth Sporting Club, New York City, New York, US	
111	Loss	65–10–5 (31)	Tiger Flowers	NWS	12	25 May 1923	Coliseum, Toledo, Ohio, US	
110	Win	65–10–5 (30)	Whitey Black	NWS	10	14 May 1923	Detroit, Michigan, US	
109	Win	65–10–5 (29)	Cowboy Lee Williams	KO	9 (12)	31 Mar 1923	Commonwealth Sporting Club, New York City, New York, US	
108	Win	64–10–5 (29)	Mike Dempsey	PTS	15	19 Mar 1923	Convention Hall, Rochester, New York, US	
107	Win	63–10–5 (29)	Jimmy O'Gatty	KO	5 (12)	17 Feb 1923	Commonwealth Sporting Club, New York City, New York, US	
106	Loss	62–10–5 (29)	Italian Joe Gans	PTS	12	6 Feb 1923	Pioneer Sporting Club, New York City, New York, US	
105	Win	62–9–5 (29)	Andy Palmer	PTS	12	6 Jan 1923	Commonwealth Sporting Club, New York City, New York, US	
104	Loss	61–9–5 (29)	Young Fisher	UD	12	15 Dec 1922	Arena, Syracuse, New York, US	
103	Draw	61–8–5 (29)	Young Fisher	PTS	12	1 Dec 1922	Arena, Syracuse, New York, US	
102	Win	61–8–4 (29)	Marty Cross	PTS	12	18 Nov 1922	Commonwealth SC, New York City, New York, US	
101	Win	60–8–4 (29)	Al Wise	TKO	7 (10)	17 Nov 1922	Arena, Syracuse, New York, US	
100	Win	59–8–4 (29)	Joe Libby	NWS	8	6 Nov 1922	Atlantic City, New Jersey, US	
99	Loss	59–8–4 (28)	Andy Palmer	DQ	6 (10)	27 Oct 1922	Clermont Avenue Rink, New York City, New York, US	
98	Win	59–7–4 (28)	Jack Blackburn	TKO	4 (10)	24 Jul 1922	Tomlinson Hall, Indianapolis, Indiana, US	
97	Win	58–7–4 (28)	Frank Barrieau	PTS	4	12 Jul 1922	Auditorium, Oakland, California, US	
96	Win	57–7–4 (28)	Frankie Denny	PTS	4	4 Jul 1922	Auditorium, Oakland, California, US	
95	Win	56–7–4 (28)	Nero Chink	PTS	12	20 May 1922	Nuevo Fronton, Havana, Cuba	
94	Draw	55–7–4 (28)	Jamaica Kid	NWS	10	10 Apr 1922	Danceland Arena, Detroit, Michigan, US	
93	Win	55–7–4 (27)	Young Dennis	KO	4 (10)	31 Mar 1922	Springfield, Ohio, US	
92	Win	54–7–4 (27)	Charley Rogers	TKO	8 (10)	13 Feb 1922	Danceland Arena, Detroit, Michigan, US	
91	Win	53–7–4 (27)	Oscar Battiste	KO	2 (15)	28 Jan 1922	Crescent Star AC, New Orleans, Louisiana, US	
90	Win	52–7–4 (27)	Jerry Hayes	KO	2 (6)	26 Dec 1921	Olympia AC, Philadelphia, Pennsylvania, US	
89	Win	51–7–4 (27)	Tiger Flowers	KO	5 (15)	15 Dec 1921	Auditorium, Atlanta, Georgia, US	
88	Win	50–7–4 (27)	Cliff Patillo	KO	2 (10)	12 Dec 1921	Columbus, Ohio, US	
87	Win	49–7–4 (27)	Allentown Joe Gans	NWS	12	6 Dec 1921	McGuigan's Arena, Harrison, New Jersey, US	
86	Win	49–7–4 (26)	Joe Borrell	TKO	9 (12)	28 Nov 1921	Arena, Trenton, New Jersey, US	
85	Win	48–7–4 (26)	Young Herman Miller	NWS	10	24 Oct 1921	Chestnut Street Auditorium, Harrisburg, Pennsylvania, US	
84	Win	48–7–4 (25)	Nero Chink	PTS	12	22 Oct 1921	Commonwealth Sporting Club, New York City, New York, US	
83	Loss	47–7–4 (25)	Jock Malone	PTS	10	12 Oct 1921	Arena, Boston, Massachusetts, US	
82	Win	47–6–4 (25)	Sailor Darden	PTS	15	5 Oct 1921	Arena, Syracuse, New York, US	
81	Win	46–6–4 (25)	Sailor Darden	PTS	15	13 Sep 1921	Convention Hall, Rochester, New York, US	
80	Loss	45–6–4 (25)	Mike McTigue	NWS	12	5 Sep 1921	Boyle's Thirty Acres, Jersey City, New Jersey, US	
79	Win	45–6–4 (24)	Alex Gibbons	PTS	12	27 Aug 1921	Commonwealth Sporting Club, New York City, New York, US	
78	Win	44–6–4 (24)	Carl Hertz	KO	6 (12)	15 Aug 1921	Armory, Jersey City, New Jersey, US	
77	Win	43–6–4 (24)	Tiger Flowers	KO	6 (15)	8 Aug 1921	Auditorium, Atlanta, Georgia, US	
76	Win	42–6–4 (24)	Jack Stone	KO	4 (8)	4 Jul 1921	Atlantic City, New Jersey, US	
75	Win	41–6–4 (24)	George Robinson	PTS	15	24 Jun 1921	Arena, Syracuse, New York, US	
74	Win	40–6–4 (24)	George 'Kid' Alberts	TKO	10 (10)	6 Jun 1921	Detroit, Michigan, US	
73	Win	39–6–4 (24)	Kid Black	PTS	8	30 May 1921	Southern A.C., Memphis, Tennessee, US	
72	Draw	38–6–4 (24)	Jackie Clark	NWS	10	27 May 1921	Mealy's Auditorium, Allentown, Pennsylvania, US	
71	Win	38–6–4 (23)	Sailor Darden	PTS	10	29 Dec 1920	Madison Square Garden, New York City, New York, US	Retained world colored middleweight title
70	Win	37–6–4 (23)	Young Jackson	KO	3 (10)	13 Dec 1920	Garden Saint Arena, Auburn, New York, US	
69	Win	36–6–4 (23)	Jim Hosic	KO	3 (10)	3 Dec 1920	Moose Temple, Detroit, Michigan, US	
68	Win	35–6–4 (23)	George Christian	KO	3 (10)	26 Nov 1920	Madison Square Garden, New York City, New York, US	
67	Win	34–6–4 (23)	Jack Tasco	KO	3 (?)	22 Oct 1920	Detroit, Michigan, US	
66	Win	33–6–4 (23)	Lew Williams	KO	4 (10)	19 Oct 1920	Commonwealth Sporting Club, New York City, New York, US	
65	Win	32–6–4 (23)	George Robinson	PTS	12	8 Oct 1920	Madison Square Garden, New York City, New York, US	Won vacant world colored middleweight title
64	Win	31–6–4 (23)	Frank Carbone	NWS	10	10 Aug 1920	Arena, Syracuse, New York, US	
63	Win	31–6–4 (22)	Cliff Patillo	TKO	4 (8)	30 Jul 1920	11th Street Arena, Philadelphia, Pennsylvania, US	
62	Win	30–6–4 (22)	Frank Carbone	NWS	10	26 Jul 1920	Rochester, New York, US	
61	Win	30–6–4 (21)	'Battling' Al Thomas	NWS	10	6 Jul 1920	Arena, Syracuse, New York, US	
60	Win	30–6–4 (20)	Speedy Moller	KO	3 (10)	5 Jul 1920	Navin Field, Detroit, Michigan, US	
59	Win	29–6–4 (20)	Young Fisher	NWS	10	15 Jun 1920	Arena, Syracuse, New York, US	
58	Win	29–6–4 (19)	Young Sam Langford	KO	9 (10)	28 May 1920	Detroit, Michigan, US	
57	Win	28–6–4 (19)	Young Fisher	KO	5 (10)	24 May 1920	Rochester, New York, US	
56	Draw	27–6–4 (19)	Jamaica Kid	PTS	10	11 May 1920	Norfolk, New Jersey, US	
55	NC	27–6–3 (19)	Eddie Tremblay	NC	12 (12)	1 Mar 1920	Arena AC, New Bedford, Massachusetts, US	
54	Win	27–6–3 (18)	Morris Tasco	KO	5 (8)	27 Feb 1920	Albaugh Theater, Baltimore, Maryland, US	
53	Win	26–6–3 (18)	Paul Dixon	NWS	10	16 Dec 1919	Arena, Syracuse, New York, US	
52	Win	26–6–3 (17)	Bert Kenny	NWS	8	23 Oct 1919	Atlantic City, New Jersey, US	
51	Win	26–6–3 (16)	Al Wise	TKO	8 (10)	7 Oct 1919	Arena, Syracuse, New York, US	
50	Draw	25–6–3 (16)	Eddie Tremblay	NWS	8	30 Sep 1919	Casino Hall, Bridgeport, Connecticut, US	
49	Win	25–6–3 (15)	Jeff Smith	NWS	8	8 Jul 1919	Atlantic City SC, Atlantic City, New Jersey, US	
48	Win	25–6–3 (14)	Britt Simms	KO	3 (10)	21 Jun 1919	Oriole Park, Baltimore, Maryland, US	
47	Win	24–6–3 (14)	Harry Robinson	PTS	10	7 Mar 1919	Albaugh Theater, Baltimore, Maryland, US	
46	Win	23–6–3 (14)	Jamaica Kid	NWS	6	3 Mar 1919	Olympia AC, Philadelphia, Pennsylvania, US	
45	Win	23–6–3 (13)	Bobby Gleason	NWS	8	27 Jan 1919	Harrison, New Jersey, US	
44	Win	23–6–3 (12)	Johnny Evans	NWS	8	6 Jan 1919	Harrison, New Jersey, US	
43	Loss	23–6–3 (11)	Joe Rivers	PTS	8	11 Jun 1918	Armory, Boston, Massachusetts, US	
42	Win	23–5–3 (11)	'Battling' Al Thomas	PTS	10	7 Jun 1918	Commercial AC, Boston, Massachusetts, US	
41	Win	22–5–3 (11)	Joe Rivers	PTS	8	21 May 1918	Armory, Boston, Massachusetts, US	
40	Loss	21–5–3 (11)	Joe Rivers	PTS	8	30 Apr 1918	Armory, Boston, Massachusetts, US	
39	Win	21–4–3 (11)	'Battling' Al Thomas	PTS	8	29 Apr 1918	Chelsea, Massachusetts, US	
38	Draw	20–4–3 (11)	'Battling' Al Thomas	PTS	6	23 Apr 1918	Armory, Boston, Massachusetts, US	
37	Win	20–4–2 (11)	Kid Green	PTS	6	2 Apr 1918	Arena (Armory AA), Boston, Massachusetts, US	
36	Loss	19–4–2 (11)	George Robinson	PTS	10	15 Mar 1918	Commercial AC, Boston, Massachusetts, US	
35	Loss	19–3–2 (11)	Fred Dyer	NWS	10	3 Nov 1917	Clermont Avenue Rink, New York City, New York, US	
34	Loss	19–3–2 (10)	Walter Mohr	NWS	10	29 Oct 1917	Vanderbilt AC, New York City, New York, US	
33	Loss	19–3–2 (9)	Young Battling Nelson	NWS	10	26 Oct 1917	Vanderbilt AC, New York City, New York, US	
32	Win	19–3–2 (8)	Walter Mohr	NWS	10	19 Oct 1917	Vanderbilt AC, New York City, New York, US	
31	Win	19–3–2 (7)	Lew Williams	DQ	9 (10)	17 Sep 1917	Vanderbilt AC, New York City, New York, US	
30	Loss	18–3–2 (7)	George Ashe	NWS	10	7 Sep 1917	Vanderbilt AC, New York City, New York, US	
29	Win	18–3–2 (6)	George 'Kid' Alberts	KO	6 (10)	4 Sep 1917	Bethlehem, Pennsylvania, US	
28	Win	17–3–2 (6)	Johnny 'Kid' Allen	NWS	10	1 Sep 1917	Vanderbilt AC, New York City, New York, US	
27	Loss	17–3–2 (5)	Walter Mohr	NWS	10	24 Aug 1917	Vanderbilt AC, New York City, New York, US	
26	Win	17–3–2 (4)	Young Battling Nelson	NWS	10	20 Aug 1917	Vanderbilt AC, New York City, New York, US	
25	Win	17–3–2 (3)	Willie Davis	NWS	10	16 Jul 1917	Vanderbilt AC, New York City, New York, US	
24	Loss	17–3–2 (2)	Tommy Madden	NWS	10	25 Jun 1917	Vanderbilt AC, New York City, New York, US	
23	Win	17–3–2 (1)	Young Sam Langford	KO	5 (10)	17 Mar 1917	Santa Ana Plaza, Panama City, Panama	
22	Loss	16–3–2 (1)	Benny McGovern	DQ	6 (10)	12 Mar 1917	Santa Ana Plaza, Panama City, Panama	Gans struck McGovern while he was on the floor from a knockdown and was DQ'd
21	Win	16–2–2 (1)	Jim Briggs	PTS	15	12 Jan 1917	Pacific Theater, Panama City, Panama	Retained Panamanian middleweight title
20	Win	15–2–2 (1)	Abe Hollandersky	PTS	20	12 Dec 1916	Santa Ana Plaza, Panama City, Panama	
19	Win	14–2–2 (1)	Benny McGovern	KO	3 (15)	30 Nov 1916	Santa Ana Plaza, Panama City, Panama	Won Panamanian middleweight title
18	Win	13–2–2 (1)	Jim Briggs	PTS	15	11 Nov 1916	Santa Ana Plaza, Panama City, Panama	
17	Win	12–2–2 (1)	Young Sam Langford	PTS	20	15 Oct 1916	Garden Theater, Colon City, Panama	
16	Loss	11–2–2 (1)	Kid Bain	DQ	12 (20)	16 Jul 1916	Plaza de Toros Vista Alegre, Panama City, Panama	For vacant Panamanian welterweight title
15	Win	11–1–2 (1)	Mickey Harrison	TKO	4 (10)	11 Jun 1916	Plaza de Toros Vista Alegre, Panama City, Panama	
14	Win	10–1–2 (1)	Willie Rothwell	TKO	4 (20)	17 May 1916	Pacific Theater, Panama City, Panama	
13	Win	9–1–2 (1)	Jerry Parquet	TKO	5 (20)	15 Apr 1916	Plaza de Toros Vista Alegre, Panama City, Panama	
12	Win	8–1–2 (1)	Young Sam Langford	KO	12 (20)	12 Feb 1916	Pacific Theater, Panama City, Panama	
11	Win	7–1–2 (1)	Young Sam Langford	PTS	20	11 Jan 1916	Calidonian Theater, Panama City, Panama	
10	Win	6–1–2 (1)	Young Sam McVea	KO	10 (20)	25 Nov 1915	Plaza de Toros Vista Alegre, Panama City, Panama	Retained Panamanian lightweight title
9	Win	5–1–2 (1)	Mickey Harrison	KO	18 (20)	14 Nov 1915	Garden Theater, Colon City, Panama	
8	Win	4–1–2 (1)	Sam Rufus	PTS	15	17 Oct 1915	Pacific Theater, Panama City, Panama	
7	Win	3–1–2 (1)	Young Sam Langford	PTS	20	10 Oct 1915	Pacific Theater, Panama City, Panama	Won vacant Panamanian lightweight title
6	NC	2–1–2 (1)	Young Jack Johnson	NC	8 (15)	11 Sep 1915	Pacific Theater, Panama City, Panama	Vacant Panamanian lightweight title at stake; Gans sank to his knees and claimed a foul nearly inducing a riot which caused the bout to be called off
5	Draw	2–1–2	Sam Rufus	PTS	6	3 Jul 1915	Pacific Theater, Panama City, Panama	
4	Loss	2–1–1	Terry Richards	KO	1 (15)	6 Jun 1915	Broadway Theater, Colon City, Panama	For Panamanian welterweight title
3	Draw	2–0–1	Kid Bain	PTS	15	10 Mar 1915	Garden Theater, Colon City, Panama	For vacant Panamanian lightweight title
2	Win	2–0	Kid Coldhurst	KO	6 (10)	20 Feb 1915	Garden Theater, Colon City, Panama	
1	Win	1–0	Billy Shea	PTS	15	6 Feb 1915	Star Theater, Colon City, Panama	

=== Unofficial record ===
136 fights	92 wins	31 losses
By knockout	45	1
By decision	46	26
By disqualification	1	4
Draws	11	
No contests	2	

Record with the inclusion of newspaper decisions in the win/loss/draw column.

No.	Result	Record	Opponent	Type	Round	Date	Location	Notes
136	Loss	92–31–11 (2)	Francisco Soler	PTS	10	10 Jun 1928	Balboa Stadium, Mayaguez, Puerto Rico	
135	Draw	92–30–11 (2)	Alejandro Villanueva	PTS	10	29 Apr 1928	Victory Garden Stadium, San Juan, Puerto Rico	
134	Loss	92–30–10 (2)	Rafael Plata	PTS	10	2 Mar 1928	San Juan Stadium, San Juan, Puerto Rico	
133	Win	92–29–10 (2)	Frank Baldi	TKO	6 (10)	10 Feb 1928	Victory Garden Stadium, San Juan, Puerto Rico	
132	Loss	91–29–10 (2)	Vincent Forgione	NWS	8	30 May 1927	Waltz Dream Arena, Atlantic City, New Jersey, US	
131	Loss	91–28–10 (2)	Homer Robertson	PTS	10	1 Jan 1927	Crescent Rink, Lowell, Massachusetts, US	
130	Draw	91–27–10 (2)	Willie Ptomey	PTS	10	22 May 1926	Commonwealth Sporting Club, New York City, New York, US	
129	Win	91–27–9 (2)	Martin Perez	KO	6 (12)	27 Mar 1926	Arena Colon, Havana, Cuba	
128	Loss	90–27–9 (2)	Esteban Gallard	PTS	12	6 Mar 1926	Arena Colon, Havana, Cuba	
127	Loss	90–26–9 (2)	Harry Martone	NWS	12	12 Oct 1925	Laurel Garden, Newark, New Jersey, US	
126	Loss	90–25–9 (2)	Georgie Levine	PTS	12	1 Aug 1925	Commonwealth Sporting Club, New York City, New York, US	
125	Win	90–24–9 (2)	Young Harry Wills	KO	7 (12)	14 Feb 1925	Plaza de Toros Vista Alegre, Panama City	
124	Win	89–24–9 (2)	Lefty Michaels	TKO	4 (12)	30 Nov 1924	Central American Stadium, Colon City, Panama	
123	Loss	88–24–9 (2)	Eliseo Quintana	DQ	2 (12)	25 Oct 1924	Rose Gardens Stadium, Kingston, Jamaica	Gans DQ'd for kayoing Quintana with a kidney punch
122	Loss	88–23–9 (2)	Larry Estridge	PTS	10	11 Aug 1924	Queensboro Stadium, New York City, New York, US	For world colored middleweight title
121	Loss	88–22–9 (2)	Larry Estridge	UD	10	26 Jun 1924	Yankee Stadium, New York City, New York, US	Lost world colored middleweight title
120	Draw	88–21–9 (2)	Tillie Herman	NWS	10	16 Jun 1924	Open-air Arena, East Chicago, Indiana, US	
119	Win	88–21–8 (2)	Jack Palmer	KO	8 (12)	26 Apr 1924	Commonwealth Sporting Club, New York City, New York, US	
118	Loss	87–21–8 (2)	Morrie Schlaifer	PTS	10	17 Dec 1923	Omaha, Nebraska, US	
117	Win	87–20–8 (2)	Danny Fagan	KO	8 (12)	12 Dec 1923	Commonwealth Sporting Club, New York City, New York, US	
116	Loss	86–20–8 (2)	Jock Malone	NWS	10	9 Nov 1923	Auditorium, Saint Paul, Minnesota, US	
115	Win	86–19–8 (2)	Whitey Black	KO	8 (12)	22 Oct 1923	Convention Hall, Rochester, New York, US	
114	Win	85–19–8 (2)	Italian Joe Gans	PTS	12	15 Sep 1923	Commonwealth Sporting Club, New York City, New York, US	
113	Loss	84–19–8 (2)	Lou Bogash	PTS	10	1 Aug 1923	Velodrome, New York City, New York, US	
112	Win	84–18–8 (2)	Willie Walker	KO	9 (12)	30 Jun 1923	Commonwealth Sporting Club, New York City, New York, US	
111	Loss	83–18–8 (2)	Tiger Flowers	NWS	12	25 May 1923	Coliseum, Toledo, Ohio, US	
110	Win	83–17–8 (2)	Whitey Black	NWS	10	14 May 1923	Detroit, Michigan, US	
109	Win	82–17–8 (2)	Cowboy Lee Williams	KO	9 (12)	31 Mar 1923	Commonwealth Sporting Club, New York City, New York, US	
108	Win	81–17–8 (2)	Mike Dempsey	PTS	15	19 Mar 1923	Convention Hall, Rochester, New York, US	
107	Win	80–17–8 (2)	Jimmy O'Gatty	KO	5 (12)	17 Feb 1923	Commonwealth Sporting Club, New York City, New York, US	
106	Loss	79–17–8 (2)	Italian Joe Gans	PTS	12	6 Feb 1923	Pioneer Sporting Club, New York City, New York, US	
105	Win	79–16–8 (2)	Andy Palmer	PTS	12	6 Jan 1923	Commonwealth Sporting Club, New York City, New York, US	
104	Loss	78–16–8 (2)	Young Fisher	UD	12	15 Dec 1922	Arena, Syracuse, New York, US	
103	Draw	78–15–8 (2)	Young Fisher	PTS	12	1 Dec 1922	Arena, Syracuse, New York, US	
102	Win	78–15–7 (2)	Marty Cross	PTS	12	18 Nov 1922	Commonwealth SC, New York City, New York, US	
101	Win	77–15–7 (2)	Al Wise	TKO	7 (10)	17 Nov 1922	Arena, Syracuse, New York, US	
100	Win	76–15–7 (2)	Joe Libby	NWS	8	6 Nov 1922	Atlantic City, New Jersey, US	
99	Loss	75–15–7 (2)	Andy Palmer	DQ	6 (10)	27 Oct 1922	Clermont Avenue Rink, New York City, New York, US	
98	Win	75–14–7 (2)	Jack Blackburn	TKO	4 (10)	24 Jul 1922	Tomlinson Hall, Indianapolis, Indiana, US	
97	Win	74–14–7 (2)	Frank Barrieau	PTS	4	12 Jul 1922	Auditorium, Oakland, California, US	
96	Win	73–14–7 (2)	Frankie Denny	PTS	4	4 Jul 1922	Auditorium, Oakland, California, US	
95	Win	72–14–7 (2)	Nero Chink	PTS	12	20 May 1922	Nuevo Fronton, Havana, Cuba	
94	Draw	71–14–7 (2)	Jamaica Kid	NWS	10	10 Apr 1922	Danceland Arena, Detroit, Michigan, US	
93	Win	71–14–6 (2)	Young Dennis	KO	4 (10)	31 Mar 1922	Springfield, Ohio, US	
92	Win	70–14–6 (2)	Charley Rogers	TKO	8 (10)	13 Feb 1922	Danceland Arena, Detroit, Michigan, US	
91	Win	69–14–6 (2)	Oscar Battiste	KO	2 (15)	28 Jan 1922	Crescent Star AC, New Orleans, Louisiana, US	
90	Win	68–14–6 (2)	Jerry Hayes	KO	2 (6)	26 Dec 1921	Olympia AC, Philadelphia, Pennsylvania, US	
89	Win	67–14–6 (2)	Tiger Flowers	KO	5 (15)	15 Dec 1921	Auditorium, Atlanta, Georgia, US	
88	Win	66–14–6 (2)	Cliff Patillo	KO	2 (10)	12 Dec 1921	Columbus, Ohio, US	
87	Win	65–14–6 (2)	Allentown Joe Gans	NWS	12	6 Dec 1921	McGuigan's Arena, Harrison, New Jersey, US	
86	Win	64–14–6 (2)	Joe Borrell	TKO	9 (12)	28 Nov 1921	Arena, Trenton, New Jersey, US	
85	Win	63–14–6 (2)	Young Herman Miller	NWS	10	24 Oct 1921	Chestnut Street Auditorium, Harrisburg, Pennsylvania, US	
84	Win	62–14–6 (2)	Nero Chink	PTS	12	22 Oct 1921	Commonwealth Sporting Club, New York City, New York, US	
83	Loss	61–14–6 (2)	Jock Malone	PTS	10	12 Oct 1921	Arena, Boston, Massachusetts, US	
82	Win	61–13–6 (2)	Sailor Darden	PTS	15	5 Oct 1921	Arena, Syracuse, New York, US	
81	Win	60–13–6 (2)	Sailor Darden	PTS	15	13 Sep 1921	Convention Hall, Rochester, New York, US	
80	Loss	59–13–6 (2)	Mike McTigue	NWS	12	5 Sep 1921	Boyle's Thirty Acres, Jersey City, New Jersey, US	
79	Win	59–12–6 (2)	Alex Gibbons	PTS	12	27 Aug 1921	Commonwealth Sporting Club, New York City, New York, US	
78	Win	58–12–6 (2)	Carl Hertz	KO	6 (12)	15 Aug 1921	Armory, Jersey City, New Jersey, US	
77	Win	57–12–6 (2)	Tiger Flowers	KO	6 (15)	8 Aug 1921	Auditorium, Atlanta, Georgia, US	
76	Win	56–12–6 (2)	Jack Stone	KO	4 (8)	4 Jul 1921	Atlantic City, New Jersey, US	
75	Win	55–12–6 (2)	George Robinson	PTS	15	24 Jun 1921	Arena, Syracuse, New York, US	
74	Win	54–12–6 (2)	George 'Kid' Alberts	TKO	10 (10)	6 Jun 1921	Detroit, Michigan, US	
73	Win	53–12–6 (2)	Kid Black	PTS	8	30 May 1921	Southern A.C., Memphis, Tennessee, US	
72	Draw	52–12–6 (2)	Jackie Clark	NWS	10	27 May 1921	Mealy's Auditorium, Allentown, Pennsylvania, US	
71	Win	52–12–5 (2)	Sailor Darden	PTS	10	29 Dec 1920	Madison Square Garden, New York City, New York, US	Retained world colored middleweight title
70	Win	51–12–5 (2)	Young Jackson	KO	3 (10)	13 Dec 1920	Garden Saint Arena, Auburn, New York, US	
69	Win	50–12–5 (2)	Jim Hosic	KO	3 (10)	3 Dec 1920	Moose Temple, Detroit, Michigan, US	
68	Win	49–12–5 (2)	George Christian	KO	3 (10)	26 Nov 1920	Madison Square Garden, New York City, New York, US	
67	Win	48–12–5 (2)	Jack Tasco	KO	3 (?)	22 Oct 1920	Detroit, Michigan, US	
66	Win	47–12–5 (2)	Lew Williams	KO	4 (10)	19 Oct 1920	Commonwealth Sporting Club, New York City, New York, US	
65	Win	46–12–5 (2)	George Robinson	PTS	12	8 Oct 1920	Madison Square Garden, New York City, New York, US	Won vacant world colored middleweight title
64	Win	45–12–5 (2)	Frank Carbone	NWS	10	10 Aug 1920	Arena, Syracuse, New York, US	
63	Win	44–12–5 (2)	Cliff Patillo	TKO	4 (8)	30 Jul 1920	11th Street Arena, Philadelphia, Pennsylvania, US	
62	Win	43–12–5 (2)	Frank Carbone	NWS	10	26 Jul 1920	Rochester, New York, US	
61	Win	42–12–5 (2)	'Battling' Al Thomas	NWS	10	6 Jul 1920	Arena, Syracuse, New York, US	
60	Win	41–12–5 (2)	Speedy Moller	KO	3 (10)	5 Jul 1920	Navin Field, Detroit, Michigan, US	
59	Win	40–12–5 (2)	Young Fisher	NWS	10	15 Jun 1920	Arena, Syracuse, New York, US	
58	Win	39–12–5 (2)	Young Sam Langford	KO	9 (10)	28 May 1920	Detroit, Michigan, US	
57	Win	38–12–5 (2)	Young Fisher	KO	5 (10)	24 May 1920	Rochester, New York, US	
56	Draw	37–12–5 (2)	Jamaica Kid	PTS	10	11 May 1920	Norfolk, New Jersey, US	
55	NC	37–12–4 (2)	Eddie Tremblay	NC	12 (12)	1 Mar 1920	Arena AC, New Bedford, Massachusetts, US	
54	Win	37–12–4 (1)	Morris Tasco	KO	5 (8)	27 Feb 1920	Albaugh Theater, Baltimore, Maryland, US	
53	Win	36–12–4 (1)	Paul Dixon	NWS	10	16 Dec 1919	Arena, Syracuse, New York, US	
52	Win	35–12–4 (1)	Bert Kenny	NWS	8	23 Oct 1919	Atlantic City, New Jersey, US	
51	Win	34–12–4 (1)	Al Wise	TKO	8 (10)	7 Oct 1919	Arena, Syracuse, New York, US	
50	Draw	33–12–4 (1)	Eddie Tremblay	NWS	8	30 Sep 1919	Casino Hall, Bridgeport, Connecticut, US	
49	Win	33–12–3 (1)	Jeff Smith	NWS	8	8 Jul 1919	Atlantic City SC, Atlantic City, New Jersey, US	
48	Win	32–12–3 (1)	Britt Simms	KO	3 (10)	21 Jun 1919	Oriole Park, Baltimore, Maryland, US	
47	Win	31–12–3 (1)	Harry Robinson	PTS	10	7 Mar 1919	Albaugh Theater, Baltimore, Maryland, US	
46	Win	30–12–3 (1)	Jamaica Kid	NWS	6	3 Mar 1919	Olympia AC, Philadelphia, Pennsylvania, US	
45	Win	29–12–3 (1)	Bobby Gleason	NWS	8	27 Jan 1919	Harrison, New Jersey, US	
44	Win	28–12–3 (1)	Johnny Evans	NWS	8	6 Jan 1919	Harrison, New Jersey, US	
43	Loss	27–12–3 (1)	Joe Rivers	PTS	8	11 Jun 1918	Armory, Boston, Massachusetts, US	
42	Win	27–11–3 (1)	'Battling' Al Thomas	PTS	10	7 Jun 1918	Commercial AC, Boston, Massachusetts, US	
41	Win	26–11–3 (1)	Joe Rivers	PTS	8	21 May 1918	Armory, Boston, Massachusetts, US	
40	Loss	25–11–3 (1)	Joe Rivers	PTS	8	30 Apr 1918	Armory, Boston, Massachusetts, US	
39	Win	25–10–3 (1)	'Battling' Al Thomas	PTS	8	29 Apr 1918	Chelsea, Massachusetts, US	
38	Draw	24–10–3 (1)	'Battling' Al Thomas	PTS	6	23 Apr 1918	Armory, Boston, Massachusetts, US	
37	Win	24–10–2 (1)	Kid Green	PTS	6	2 Apr 1918	Arena (Armory AA), Boston, Massachusetts, US	
36	Loss	23–10–2 (1)	George Robinson	PTS	10	15 Mar 1918	Commercial AC, Boston, Massachusetts, US	
35	Loss	23–9–2 (1)	Fred Dyer	NWS	10	3 Nov 1917	Clermont Avenue Rink, New York City, New York, US	
34	Loss	23–8–2 (1)	Walter Mohr	NWS	10	29 Oct 1917	Vanderbilt AC, New York City, New York, US	
33	Loss	23–7–2 (1)	Young Battling Nelson	NWS	10	26 Oct 1917	Vanderbilt AC, New York City, New York, US	
32	Win	23–6–2 (1)	Walter Mohr	NWS	10	19 Oct 1917	Vanderbilt AC, New York City, New York, US	
31	Win	22–6–2 (1)	Lew Williams	DQ	9 (10)	17 Sep 1917	Vanderbilt AC, New York City, New York, US	
30	Loss	21–6–2 (1)	George Ashe	NWS	10	7 Sep 1917	Vanderbilt AC, New York City, New York, US	
29	Win	21–5–2 (1)	George 'Kid' Alberts	KO	6 (10)	4 Sep 1917	Bethlehem, Pennsylvania, US	
28	Win	20–5–2 (1)	Johnny 'Kid' Allen	NWS	10	1 Sep 1917	Vanderbilt AC, New York City, New York, US	
27	Loss	19–5–2 (1)	Walter Mohr	NWS	10	24 Aug 1917	Vanderbilt AC, New York City, New York, US	
26	Win	19–4–2 (1)	Young Battling Nelson	NWS	10	20 Aug 1917	Vanderbilt AC, New York City, New York, US	
25	Win	18–4–2 (1)	Willie Davis	NWS	10	16 Jul 1917	Vanderbilt AC, New York City, New York, US	
24	Loss	17–4–2 (1)	Tommy Madden	NWS	10	25 Jun 1917	Vanderbilt AC, New York City, New York, US	
23	Win	17–3–2 (1)	Young Sam Langford	KO	5 (10)	17 Mar 1917	Santa Ana Plaza, Panama City, Panama	
22	Loss	16–3–2 (1)	Benny McGovern	DQ	6 (10)	12 Mar 1917	Santa Ana Plaza, Panama City, Panama	Gans struck McGovern while he was on the floor from a knockdown and was DQ'd
21	Win	16–2–2 (1)	Jim Briggs	PTS	15	12 Jan 1917	Pacific Theater, Panama City, Panama	Retained Panamanian middleweight title
20	Win	15–2–2 (1)	Abe Hollandersky	PTS	20	12 Dec 1916	Santa Ana Plaza, Panama City, Panama	
19	Win	14–2–2 (1)	Benny McGovern	KO	3 (15)	30 Nov 1916	Santa Ana Plaza, Panama City, Panama	Won Panamanian middleweight title
18	Win	13–2–2 (1)	Jim Briggs	PTS	15	11 Nov 1916	Santa Ana Plaza, Panama City, Panama	
17	Win	12–2–2 (1)	Young Sam Langford	PTS	20	15 Oct 1916	Garden Theater, Colon City, Panama	
16	Loss	11–2–2 (1)	Kid Bain	DQ	12 (20)	16 Jul 1916	Plaza de Toros Vista Alegre, Panama City, Panama	For vacant Panamanian welterweight title
15	Win	11–1–2 (1)	Mickey Harrison	TKO	4 (10)	11 Jun 1916	Plaza de Toros Vista Alegre, Panama City, Panama	
14	Win	10–1–2 (1)	Willie Rothwell	TKO	4 (20)	17 May 1916	Pacific Theater, Panama City, Panama	
13	Win	9–1–2 (1)	Jerry Parquet	TKO	5 (20)	15 Apr 1916	Plaza de Toros Vista Alegre, Panama City, Panama	
12	Win	8–1–2 (1)	Young Sam Langford	KO	12 (20)	12 Feb 1916	Pacific Theater, Panama City, Panama	
11	Win	7–1–2 (1)	Young Sam Langford	PTS	20	11 Jan 1916	Calidonian Theater, Panama City, Panama	
10	Win	6–1–2 (1)	Young Sam McVea	KO	10 (20)	25 Nov 1915	Plaza de Toros Vista Alegre, Panama City, Panama	Retained Panamanian lightweight title
9	Win	5–1–2 (1)	Mickey Harrison	KO	18 (20)	14 Nov 1915	Garden Theater, Colon City, Panama	
8	Win	4–1–2 (1)	Sam Rufus	PTS	15	17 Oct 1915	Pacific Theater, Panama City, Panama	
7	Win	3–1–2 (1)	Young Sam Langford	PTS	20	10 Oct 1915	Pacific Theater, Panama City, Panama	Won vacant Panamanian lightweight title
6	NC	2–1–2 (1)	Young Jack Johnson	NC	8 (15)	11 Sep 1915	Pacific Theater, Panama City, Panama	Vacant Panamanian lightweight title at stake; Gans sank to his knees and claimed a foul nearly inducing a riot which caused the bout to be called off
5	Draw	2–1–2	Sam Rufus	PTS	6	3 Jul 1915	Pacific Theater, Panama City, Panama	
4	Loss	2–1–1	Terry Richards	KO	1 (15)	6 Jun 1915	Broadway Theater, Colon City, Panama	For Panamanian welterweight title
3	Draw	2–0–1	Kid Bain	PTS	15	10 Mar 1915	Garden Theater, Colon City, Panama	For vacant Panamanian lightweight title
2	Win	2–0	Kid Coldhurst	KO	6 (10)	20 Feb 1915	Garden Theater, Colon City, Panama	
1	Win	1–0	Billy Shea	PTS	15	6 Feb 1915	Star Theater, Colon City, Panama	

== Achievements ==
Awards and achievements
Preceded by Jamaica Kid	World Colored Middleweight Champ; 8 October 1920 – 26 July 1924	Succeeded by Larry Estridge
