= Esteban Gallard =

Cuban boxer (1901–1929)

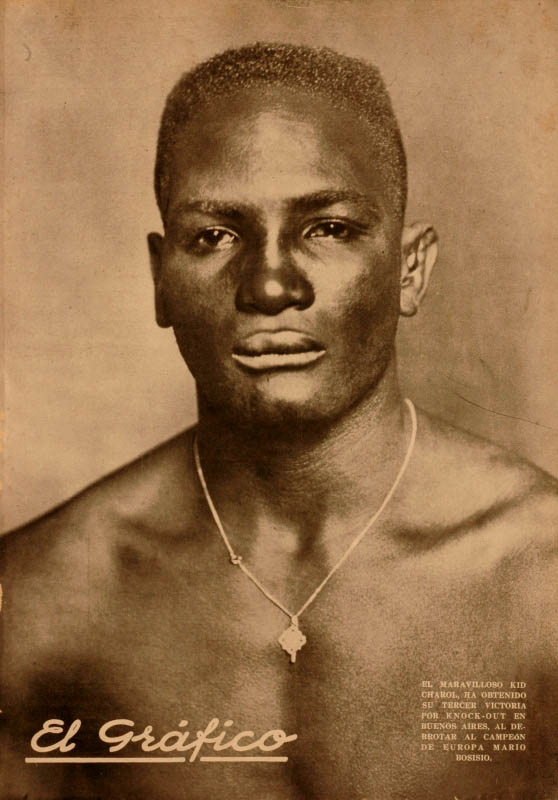
- Kid Charol as seen on the cover of Argentine sports magazine El Gráfico in 1927.

Personal information
- Nickname: Kid Charol
- Born: Esteban Gallard; January 11, 1901 Sagua La Grande, Cuba
- Died: October 7, 1929 (aged 28) Buenos Aires, Argentina
- Height: 5 ft 8 in (1.73 m)
- Weight: Middleweight

Boxing career
- Reach: 71 in (180 cm)
- Stance: Orthodox

Boxing record
- Total fights: 67
- Wins: 54
- Win by KO: 34
- Losses: 3
- Draws: 10

Esteban Gallard (January 1, 1901 – October 7, 1929) was a Cuban boxer who found international fame under the nickname Kid Charol. While Charol never won a world boxing title, he did obtain popularity, especially in Argentina where he lived for the last years of his life after moving there from his Cuban hometown of Sagua la Grande. He had a short career as he died at age 28.

== Professional career ==
Charol began his professional boxing career May 20, 1922, when he outpointed Fabio Lameida over eight rounds in Sagua, Cuba. For his third bout, November 1 of the same year, he faced a boxer named Kid Shadow. In his first professional bout abroad, Kid Charol knocked Kid Shadow out, apparently in the first round, at Panama. However, while most records point at this to be a first-round knockout, it remains unclear whether this knockout victory was actually achieved in the first round.

His next bout is said to have taken place on December 1, also in Panama. According to records, he beat Kid Brown in the first round that day, but, once again, the round in which the fight was over, and, in this case also, the actual date of the Charol-Brown bout, remain unclear. Kid Charol fought during an era when boxing records and the such were not always updated.

On January 1, 1923, Charol was held winless for the first time in his career, Enrique Ponce De Leon managing to fight to a ten-round draw (tie) with Charol.

Three more victories followed, and then, on August 25, he faced "Cuco Morales". Morales apparently insisted on fouling Kid Charol by hitting him low, and was disqualified in the second round.

Charol won three and drew one of his next four bouts, and then, on February 16, 1924, he was defeated for the first time, losing to Jimmy Finley by a fifteen-round decision in Havana. On his next fight, March 15 of the same year, Charol won the Cuban Middleweight title, when he knocked Rafael Fello Rodriguez in the fifth round of a rematch. Their first bout had ended in a fifteen-round draw.

Next, on April 1, he apparently fought a Homer Robertson. Whether this fight actually happened or not is also a mystery; some records show that Charol beat Robertson by a fifth-round knockout; other Kid Charol records do not list this fight as happening at all.

Kid Charol won four more fights, then headed to South America permanently. His first fight there, against Victor Alba, also has a mystery element, because, although it is believed that it took place on January 1, 1925, the date of the bout is not exactly known. Charol did defeat Alba by a first-round knockout in Lima, Peru.

On March 1, Kid Charol supposedly knocked out Alex Rely, also in Lima, in another fight whose exact date is not known.

After those two bouts, Charol moved on to Chile, fighting in Santiago three times. Once again, his first bout there, against Victor Contreras, happened without an exact date given on records, but it is generally believed that Charol outpointed Contreras over ten rounds in June 1925.

Charol returned to Cuba for one bout, defeating Abdel El Kebir by a fourth-round knockout on January 30, 1926. The very next day, he may have fought Jamaica's Peter Sung, winning by a ninth-round knockout. No proof exists that the fight with Sung ever happened, but a Jamaican newspaper published a story about it.

Charol won his next four fights, before moving to Argentina. On November 13, 1926, he made his Argentine debut by knocking Alejandro Trias out in five rounds at Buenos Aires.

On December 10, Charo dropped Luis Gaitieri ten times before stopping Gaitieri in the seventh round. Next came two fight trilogies that were sandwiched: Charol lost and drew with Michele Bonaglia before fighting three consecutive bouts with Eduardo Brissett. Having beaten Brissett once and drawn with him twice, Charol then faced Bonaglia for the third time, losing a twelve-round decision.

By then, Charol was starting to develop tuberculosis. During this time his popularity among Argentine boxing fans rose even more, as they knew that he fought on despite his illness, winning three more bouts.

Charol's condition worsened, and by 1929, he started to spend a lot of time in hospital. He managed, however, to keep training, and secured a fight with future International Boxing Hall of Fame member Dave Shade, who traveled to Argentina for the bout. Charol was hospitalized when asked if he wanted to fight with Shade, and in critical condition when Shade arrived in Argentina. Nevertheless, Charol discharged himself from hospital days before the bout, and held Shade to a twelve-round draw, in a fight held on April 30 of that year.

This would turn out to be Charol's last fight, as his condition kept on worsening, and he died five and a half months later, on October 7, in Buenos Aires.

Kid Charol had a record of 53 wins, 3 losses and 10 draws, with 34 wins by knockout.

== Professional boxing record ==
67 fights	54 wins	3 losses
By knockout	34	0
By decision	19	3
By disqualification	1	0
Draws	10	

No.	Result	Record	Opponent	Type	Round, time	Date	Location	Notes
67	Draw	54–3–10	Dave Shade	PTS	12	Apr 30, 1929	Parque Romano, Buenos Aires, Argentina	
66	Win	54–3–9	Ted Moore	PTS	12	Feb 7, 1929	Club Atletico River Plate, Buenos Aires, Argentina	
65	Loss	53–3–9	Charley Hahn	PTS	12	Dec 1, 1928	River Plate Club, Buenos Aires, Argentina	
64	Win	53–2–9	Armando De Carolis	TKO	7 (12)	May 31, 1928	Teatro Coliseo, Buenos Aires, Argentina	
63	Draw	52–2–9	Manuel K.O. Brissett	PTS	12	Apr 7, 1928	River Plate Club, Buenos Aires, Argentina	
62	Loss	52–2–8	Michele Bonaglia	PTS	12	Mar 10, 1928	River Plate Club, Buenos Aires, Argentina	
61	Win	52–1–8	Manuel K.O. Brissett	PTS	10	Jan 2, 1928	Buenos Aires, Argentina	
60	Draw	51–1–8	Guillermo Silva	PTS	12	Nov 12, 1927	Club Atletico Boca Juniors, Buenos Aires, Argentina	
59	Draw	51–1–7	Michele Bonaglia	PTS	12	Mar 19, 1927	Estadio River Plate, Buenos Aires, Argentina	
58	Win	51–1–6	Mario Bosisio	KO	5 (12)	Feb 12, 1927	Estadio River Plate, Buenos Aires, Argentina	
57	Win	50–1–6	Luis Galtieri	KO	7 (12)	Dec 10, 1926	Parque Romano, Buenos Aires, Argentina	
56	Win	49–1–6	Alejandro Trias	KO	5 (12)	Nov 13, 1926	Parque Romano, Buenos Aires, Argentina	
55	Win	48–1–6	Jerome Vernier	PTS	10	Oct 16, 1926	Buenos Aires, Argentina	
54	Draw	47–1–6	Alberto Icochea	PTS	12	Sep 26, 1926	Plaza de Toros de Acho, Lima, Peru	
53	Win	47–1–5	Larry Estridge	PTS	15	Jul 4, 1926	Havana, Cuba	
52	Win	46–1–5	Ricardo Alis	TKO	4 (10)	Jun 5, 1926	Santos & Artigas, Havana, Cuba	
51	Win	45–1–5	Panama Joe Gans	PTS	12	Mar 6, 1926	Arena Colon, Havana, Cuba	
50	Win	44–1–5	Jimmy Kelly	KO	1 (10)	Feb 20, 1926	Havana, Cuba	
49	Win	43–1–5	Peter Sung	KO	9 (?)	Feb, 1926	Cuba	Date and venue unknown
48	Win	42–1–5	Abd El Kebir	KO	4 (10)	Jan 30, 1926	Havana, Cuba	
47	Win	41–1–5	Willie Murray	PTS	12	Dec 26, 1925	Hippodrome Circo, Santiago de Chile, Chile	
46	Win	40–1–5	Pablo Munoz	KO	4 (12)	Dec 12, 1925	Hippodrome Circo, Santiago de Chile, Chile	
45	Draw	39–1–5	Victor Contreras	PTS	12	Nov 7, 1925	Hippodrome Circo, Santiago de Chile, Chile	
44	Win	39–1–4	Alex Rely	TKO	8 (?)	Aug 23, 1925	Lima, Peru	
43	Draw	38–1–4	Manuel K.O. Brissett	PTS	12	Jul 19, 1925	Lima, Peru	
42	Win	38–1–3	Victor Alva	KO	1 (10)	Jan 1, 1925	Lima, Peru	
41	Win	37–1–3	Kid Shadow	KO	5 (12)	Nov 9, 1924	Central American Stadium, Colon City, Panama	
40	Win	36–1–3	Bearcat Reid	KO	3 (12)	Oct 25, 1924	Plaza de Toros Vista Alegre, Panama City, Panama	
39	Win	35–1–3	Jimmy DeCapua	KO	3 (10)	Oct 18, 1924	Plaza de Toros Vista Alegre, Panama City, Panama	
38	Win	34–1–3	Gunboat Skee	KO	1 (12)	Oct 11, 1924	Santa Ana Pavilion, Panama City, Panama	
37	Win	33–1–3	Cabo Luis Guzman	KO	2 (10)	Sep 20, 1924	Arena Colon, Havana, Cuba	
36	Win	32–1–3	Clemente Sanchez	KO	9 (10)	Sep 6, 1924	Havana, Cuba	
35	Win	31–1–3	Homer Robertson	KO	6 (10)	Aug 23, 1924	Havana, Cuba	
34	Win	30–1–3	Joe Mallin	KO	3 (?)	Jun 14, 1924	Havana, Cuba	Round not certain
33	Win	29–1–3	Eladio Herrera	KO	5 (?)	Jun 7, 1924	Santos & Artigas, Havana, Cuba	
32	Win	28–1–3	Fred Archer	PTS	12	Apr 12, 1924	Havana, Cuba	
31	Win	27–1–3	Rafael Fello Rodriguez	KO	5 (?)	Mar 15, 1924	Havana, Cuba	Won Cuban middleweight title
30	Loss	26–1–3	Jimmy Finley	PTS	15	Feb 16, 1924	Havana, Cuba	
29	Win	26–0–3	Manuel Manso	KO	8 (8)	Dec 26, 1923	Santa Clara, Cuba	
28	Win	25–0–3	Lester Lara	KO	4 (?)	Dec 16, 1923	Santos & Artigas, Havana, Cuba	Exact round not known
27	Draw	24–0–3	Eladio Herrera	PTS	10	Nov 15, 1923	Havana, Cuba	
26	Win	24–0–2	Rafael Fello Rodriguez	PTS	10	Nov, 1923	Havana, Cuba	Exact date unknown
25	Win	23–0–2	Estanislao Frias	PTS	12	Oct 28, 1923	Havana, Cuba	
24	Win	22–0–2	Jesus Herrera	KO	8 (8)	Oct 15, 1923	Sagua, Cuba	
23	Win	21–0–2	Alberto Dumois	KO	2 (?)	Oct 6, 1923	Havana, Cuba	
22	Draw	20–0–2	Rafael Fello Rodriguez	PTS	15	Sep 12, 1923	Havana, Cuba	For Cuban middleweight title
21	Win	20–0–1	Cuco Morales	DQ	2 (?)	Aug 25, 1923	Arena Colon, Havana, Cuba	Morales DQ'd for persistent low blows
20	Win	19–0–1	Carlos Lopez	KO	5 (?)	Aug 12, 1923	Playa de Marianao, Havana, Cuba	
19	Win	18–0–1	Eladio Herrera	PTS	10	Aug 2, 1923	Sagua, Cuba	
18	Win	17–0–1	Eladio Herrera	PTS	10	Jul 21, 1923	Arena Colon, Havana, Cuba	
17	Win	16–0–1	Clemente Sánchez	PTS	10	Jul 7, 1923	Havana, Cuba	
16	Win	15–0–1	Enrique Ponce de Leon	PTS	10	Jun, 1923	Havana, Cuba	Exact date unknown
15	Win	14–0–1	Kid Campillo	KO	1 (?)	Jun 16, 1923	Havana, Cuba	
14	Win	13–0–1	Eusebio Sole	KO	3 (?)	May 20, 1923	Sagua, Cuba	
13	Win	12–0–1	Jesus Herrera	PTS	10	May 10, 1923	Sagua, Cuba	
12	Draw	11–0–1	Enrique Ponce de Leon	PTS	10	Apr, 1923	Havana, Cuba	Exact date unknown
11	Win	11–0	Rafael Perez	PTS	6	Mar 4, 1923	Sagua, Cuba	
10	Win	10–0	Carlos Lopez	KO	9 (10)	Feb 11, 1923	Sagua, Cuba	
9	Win	9–0	Carlos Lopez	KO	5 (?)	Jan 8, 1923	Havana, Cuba	
8	Win	8–0	Miguel Gonzalez	PTS	10	Nov 25, 1922	Sagua, Cuba	
7	Win	7–0	Manuel Manso	KO	3 (?)	Oct 4, 1922	Sagua, Cuba	
6	Win	6–0	Emilio Rodriguez	PTS	10	Sep 4, 1922	Sagua, Cuba	
5	Win	5–0	JA Rios	PTS	10	Jul 20, 1922	Sagua, Cuba	
4	Win	4–0	Nestor Morejon	KO	2 (?)	Jun 26, 1922	Sagua, Cuba	
3	Win	3–0	Miguel Medina	PTS	8	Jun 18, 1922	Santa Clara, Cuba	Month and day unknown
2	Win	2–0	MS McVea	KO	3 (6)	Jun 4, 1922	Sagua, Cuba	
1	Win	1–0	Fabio Lameida	KO	3 (6)	May 20, 1922	Sagua, Cuba	

== See also ==
- List of Cubans
