= Jack Delaney =

Canadian boxer

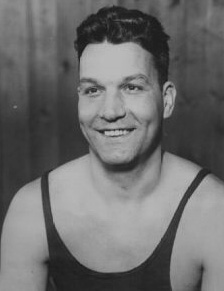

Personal information
- Nickname: Bright Eyes
- Born: Ovila Ucarice Chapdelaine; March 19, 1900 Quebec, Canada
- Died: November 27, 1948 (aged 48) Katonah, New York
- Weight: Light Heavyweight, Heavyweight

Boxing career
- Stance: Orthodox

Boxing record
- Total fights: 90
- Wins: 73
- Win by KO: 43
- Losses: 11
- Draws: 2
- No contests: 2

Jack Delaney (March 19, 1900 – November 27, 1948) was a world light heavyweight boxing champion and contender for the heavyweight crown. One of the most popular fighters of the 1920s, the French Canadian was born Ovila Chapdelaine in Saint-François-du-Lac, Quebec, Canada. His parents moved their family to the United States on August 15, 1904, where they initially lived in Holyoke, Massachusetts before settling in Bridgeport, Connecticut. Delaney became a United States Citizen on October 23, 1936.

== Reputation ==
Delaney was known for his beautiful, seemingly flawless movements in the ring. He was an accomplished boxer with a smooth and quick left hand. In addition he had one-punch knockout power in his right hand. Early in his career he broke both his hands and seemed through. His contract was purchased by Pete Reilly for 900 dollars, who promptly promoted Delaney into an attraction worth a half million dollars.

== Early career ==
In 1924, Delaney decisioned future light heavyweight champion Tommy Loughran, and less than a month later, in Madison Square Garden, Delaney first faced the hard punching Paul Berlenbach. In a great fight that saw both men knocked to the canvas, Delaney scored two knockdowns in the fourth round, causing the referee to stop the fight.

Delaney was also involved in a bizarre match with future middleweight champion Tiger Flowers. After a round had passed, Delaney floored Flowers with a straight right hand. The referee counted Flowers out, but his corner protested that he had received a "fast count". The Flowers faction became unruly and a riot seemed imminent. Flowers demanded that the match resume, and Delaney amazingly agreed. The two fought until the fourth round, when Delaney again fired an irresistible right hand that knocked Flowers senseless. This time there was no controversy, as Flowers did not come close to arising in time. When Flowers did come to, he went to Delaney's dressing room and said "Ah want to thank you, Mr. Delaney, and tell you that Ah is convinced."

== Championships ==
Delaney was rewarded with a title shot against light heavyweight champion Berlenbach, in a 15-round fight, co-promoted by Roderick James "Jess" McMahon and Tex Rickard. In an outstanding display of courage, perseverance and fortitude, Berlenbach upset Delaney by winning a 15-round decision. Delaney then embarked on an eleven-fight winning streak that led to a rematch. The fight was held in Brooklyn's Ebbets Field and spurred on by his loudly cheering female fans, known as "Delaney's screaming mamies," Delaney dropped Berlenbach, controlled the fight and won the light heavyweight title.

Early in 1927, Delaney relinquished his championship in order to pursue the heavyweight crown. He was matched against Jimmy Maloney, a journeyman heavyweight contender Delaney was expected to defeat handily. Had Delaney defeated Maloney, he would have faced the heavyweight champion Gene Tunney.

== Preparation ==
Delaney always prepared for fights in secluded training camps, in idyllic settings where no liquor was allowed on the premises. Unknown to the fans and sportswriters of the day was the reason for the no liquor rules; Delaney drank. He didn't just drink socially, but would disappear on benders lasting days. Before the Maloney fight, Delaney disappeared on a three-day toot. Unknown to his manager, sometime during the three days, Delaney threw a punch at a railroad porter. The porter ducked, and Delaney hit the steel side of the rail car, breaking his hand. He told no one of his injury and fought Maloney, anyway. Unable to throw his right, Delaney dropped the 10-round decision.

== Obstacles ==
By this time, Delaney's drinking had become a major obstacle in his career. In his last big fight he was matched with future heavyweight champion Jack Sharkey. Once again, the possibility of a crack at the heavyweight crown, and a big gate with Tunney, was in the balance. This time Delaney entered the ring flabby, bloated and listless. When the bell rang for the opening round he was unable to move. Apparently intoxicated to the point of virtual paralysis, Delaney stood staring at his corner as Sharkey came across the ring. Sharkey paused momentarily in disbelief, and then knocked Delaney to the canvas. The fight ended with Delaney on his hands and knees, crawling around the ring like a man looking for a lost button, while the referee counted him out. The emotional Sharkey, his mouth piece hanging halfway out of his mouth, clung to the top ring rope crying in joy, as the furious spectators cried fix.

== Retirement ==
Delaney retired with a record of 77 wins (44 KOs), 12 losses, and 2 draws, 2 No Decisions and 2 No Contests. After his boxing career he operated a number of businesses, ran a tavern in New York and refereed. He died of cancer in 1948.

== Professional boxing record ==
All information in this section is derived from BoxRec, unless otherwise stated.

=== Official record ===
90 fights	73 wins	11 losses
By knockout	43	3
By decision	28	8
By disqualification	2	0
Draws	2	
No contests	2	
Newspaper decisions/draws	2	

All newspaper decisions are officially regarded as “no decision” bouts and are not counted in the win/loss/draw column.

No.	Result	Record	Opponent	Type	Round	Date	Location	Notes
90	Win	73–11–2 (4)	Leo Williams	KO	1 (10)	Apr 21, 1932	Foot Guard Hall, Hartford, Connecticut, U.S.	
89	Win	72–11–2 (4)	Cowboy Jack Willis	TKO	3 (10)	Mar 29, 1932	Columbus Hall, Stamford, Connecticut, U.S.	
88	Win	71–11–2 (4)	Phil Johnson	KO	2 (10)	Mar 3, 1932	Red Men's Hall, Bridgeport, Connecticut, U.S.	
87	Win	70–11–2 (4)	Nando Tassi	TKO	11 (15)	Sep 20, 1928	Ebbets Field, Brooklyn, New York City, New York, U.S.	
86	Loss	69–11–2 (4)	Jack Sharkey	KO	1 (15)	Apr 30, 1928	Madison Square Garden, New York City, New York, U.S.	
85	Loss	69–10–2 (4)	Tom Heeney	UD	15	Mar 1, 1928	Madison Square Garden, New York City, New York, U.S.	
84	Win	69–9–2 (4)	Leo Gates	KO	2 (10)	Feb 13, 1928	Edgerton Park Arena, Rochester, New York, U.S.	
83	Win	68–9–2 (4)	Jack Humbeeck	TKO	6 (10)	Jan 20, 1928	Mechanics Building, Boston, Massachusetts, U.S.	
82	Win	67–9–2 (4)	Sully Montgomery	KO	1 (10)	Jan 16, 1928	St. Nicholas Arena, New York City, New York, U.S.	
81	Win	66–9–2 (4)	Paul Berlenbach	TKO	6 (10)	Dec 9, 1927	Coliseum, Chicago, Illinois, U.S.	
80	Win	65–9–2 (4)	Jack Renault	PTS	10	Oct 14, 1927	Madison Square Garden, New York City, New York, U.S.	
79	Loss	64–9–2 (4)	Johnny Risko	PTS	10	Sep 14, 1927	Taylor Bowl, Newburgh Heights, Ohio, U.S.	
78	Win	64–8–2 (4)	Paulino Uzcudun	DQ	7 (10)	Aug 11, 1927	Yankee Stadium, Bronx, New York City, New York, U.S.	
77	Loss	63–8–2 (4)	Jim Maloney	UD	10	Feb 18, 1927	Madison Square Garden, New York City, New York, U.S.	
76	Win	63–7–2 (4)	Bud Gorman	KO	2 (10)	Dec 20, 1926	4th Regiment Armory, Jersey City, New Jersey, U.S.	
75	Win	62–7–2 (4)	Jamaica Kid	TKO	3 (15)	Dec 10, 1926	State Armory, Waterbury, Connecticut, U.S.	Retained NBA, NYSAC, and The Ring light heavyweight titles
74	Win	61–7–2 (4)	Paul Berlenbach	UD	15	Jul 16, 1926	Ebbets Field, Brooklyn, New York City, New York, U.S.	Won NBA, NYSAC, and The Ring light heavyweight titles
73	Win	60–7–2 (4)	Bob Sage	NWS	10	Jun 16, 1926	Coliseum Ring, Detroit, Michigan, U.S.	
72	Win	60–7–2 (3)	Tom Burns	TKO	2 (10)	Jun 3, 1926	Ebbets Field, Brooklyn, New York City, New York, U.S.	
71	Win	59–7–2 (3)	Martin O'Grady	KO	7 (10)	May 12, 1926	Forum, Montreal, Quebec, Canada	
70	Win	58–7–2 (3)	Emilio Solomon	PTS	12	Apr 26, 1926	Foot Guard Hall, Hartford, Connecticut, U.S.	
69	Win	57–7–2 (3)	Maxie Rosenbloom	PTS	10	Mar 22, 1926	Arena, Philadelphia, Pennsylvania, U.S.	
68	Win	56–7–2 (3)	Mike McTigue	TKO	4 (10)	Mar 15, 1926	Madison Square Garden, New York City, New York, U.S.	
67	Win	55–7–2 (3)	Joe Lohman	TKO	10 (12)	Mar 8, 1926	Broadway Arena, Brooklyn, New York City, New York, U.S.	
66	Win	54–7–2 (3)	Quintin Romero Rojas	KO	4 (10)	Feb 22, 1926	Arena, Philadelphia, Pennsylvania, U.S.	
65	Win	53–7–2 (3)	Johnny Risko	PTS	10	Feb 5, 1926	Madison Square Garden, New York City, New York, U.S.	
64	Win	52–7–2 (3)	Tom Roper	TKO	12 (12)	Jan 25, 1926	Canton Auditorium, Canton, Ohio, U.S.	
63	Win	51–7–2 (3)	Young Bob Fitzsimmons	PTS	12	Jan 15, 1926	Madison Square Garden, New York City, New York, U.S.	
62	Loss	50–7–2 (3)	Paul Berlenbach	PTS	15	Dec 11, 1925	Madison Square Garden, New York City, New York, U.S.	For NBA, NYSAC, and The Ring light heavyweight titles
61	Win	50–6–2 (3)	Jack Burke	TKO	9 (12)	Jul 24, 1925	Coney Island Stadium, Brooklyn, New York City, New York, U.S.	
60	Draw	49–6–2 (3)	Tommy Loughran	PTS	10	Jul 16, 1925	Shibe Park, Philadelphia, Pennsylvania, U.S.	
59	Win	49–6–1 (3)	Tony Marullo	UD	12	May 20, 1925	Yankee Stadium, Bronx, New York City, New York, U.S.	
58	Win	48–6–1 (3)	Soldier King	TKO	4 (12)	Mar 20, 1925	Armory, Grand Rapids, Michigan, U.S.	
57	Win	47–6–1 (3)	Jamaica Kid	KO	2 (10)	Mar 9, 1925	Elmwood Music Hall, Buffalo, New York, U.S.	
56	Win	46–6–1 (3)	Tiger Flowers	KO	4 (12)	Feb 26, 1925	Madison Square Garden, New York City, New York, U.S.	
55	Loss	45–6–1 (3)	Jimmy Slattery	PTS	6	Feb 13, 1925	Madison Square Garden, New York City, New York, U.S.	
54	Win	45–5–1 (3)	Allentown Joe Gans	SD	10	Jan 19, 1925	South Main Street Armory, Wilkes-Barre, Pennsylvania, U.S.	
53	Win	44–5–1 (3)	Tiger Flowers	KO	2 (12)	Jan 16, 1925	Madison Square Garden, New York City, New York, U.S.	
52	Win	43–5–1 (3)	Pal Reed	PTS	12	Dec 26, 1924	Madison Square Garden, New York City, New York, U.S.	
51	Win	42–5–1 (3)	George Mulholland	TKO	8 (12)	Oct 30, 1924	Rink S.C., Brooklyn, New York City, New York, U.S.	
50	Win	41–5–1 (3)	Pat McCarthy	DQ	8 (10)	Oct 20, 1924	Arena, Boston, Massachusetts, U.S.	McCarthy was disqualified for "not fighting"
49	Loss	40–5–1 (3)	Jimmy Slattery	PTS	6	Oct 3, 1924	Madison Square Garden, New York City, New York, U.S.	
48	Win	40–4–1 (3)	Frank Moody	TKO	6 (12)	Aug 27, 1924	State Street Arena, Bridgeport, Connecticut, U.S.	
47	Loss	39–4–1 (3)	Bryan Downey	PTS	12	May 5, 1924	Columbus, Ohio, U.S.	
46	Win	39–3–1 (3)	George Robinson	PTS	10	Apr 10, 1924	Mechanics Building, Boston, Massachusetts, U.S.	
45	Win	38–3–1 (3)	Leo Leonard	TKO	3 (12)	Mar 31, 1924	Casino Hall, Bridgeport, Connecticut, U.S.	
44	NC	37–3–1 (3)	Jackie Clark	NC	8 (12)	Mar 17, 1924	113th Regiment Armory, Newark, New Jersey, U.S.	Bout halted for lack of action
43	Win	37–3–1 (2)	Paul Berlenbach	KO	4 (12)	Mar 14, 1924	Madison Square Garden, New York City, New York, U.S.	
42	Win	36–3–1 (2)	Tommy Loughran	PTS	10	Feb 19, 1924	Mechanics Building, Boston, Massachusetts, U.S.	
41	Win	35–3–1 (2)	Sailor Martin	KO	1 (?)	Feb 11, 1924	Lenox A.C., New York City, New York, U.S.	
40	Win	34–3–1 (2)	Jackie Clark	TKO	2 (12)	Jan 4, 1924	Armory, Norwalk, Connecticut, U.S.	
39	Win	33–3–1 (2)	Jimmy Darcy	PTS	10	Aug 31, 1923	Polo Grounds, New York City, New York, U.S.	
38	Win	32–3–1 (2)	Andy Kid Palmer	PTS	12	Aug 20, 1923	State Street Arena, Bridgeport, Connecticut, U.S.	
37	Win	31–3–1 (2)	Tommy Madden	KO	1 (10)	Jul 4, 1923	Falco Field, Holyoke, Massachusetts, U.S.	
36	NC	30–3–1 (2)	Jimmy O'Gatty	NC	5 (10)	Mar 19, 1923	Infantry Hall, Providence, Rhode Island, U.S.	
35	Win	30–3–1 (1)	Augie Ratner	PTS	12	Mar 3, 1923	Commonwealth Sporting Club, New York City, New York, U.S.	
34	Win	29–3–1 (1)	Italian Joe Gans	PTS	12	Feb 20, 1923	Pioneer Sporting Club, New York City, New York, U.S.	
33	Loss	28–3–1 (1)	Young Fisher	TKO	3 (12)	Oct 11, 1922	National A.C., Providence, Rhode Island, U.S.	
32	Win	28–2–1 (1)	Frank Cavanaugh	TKO	3 (10)	Oct 6, 1922	Elks' Hall, Stamford, Connecticut, U.S.	
31	Win	27–2–1 (1)	George Shade	KO	1 (12)	Aug 14, 1922	Clinton Oval, Woonsocket, Rhode Island, U.S.	
30	Win	26–2–1 (1)	Hugh Ross	PTS	15	Apr 10, 1922	Casino, Fall River, Massachusetts, U.S.	
29	Win	25–2–1 (1)	Jack Stone	PTS	10	Mar 29, 1922	Casino, Fall River, Massachusetts, U.S.	
28	Loss	24–2–1 (1)	Augie Ratner	TKO	1 (12)	Mar 6, 1922	Broadway Arena, Brooklyn, New York City, New York, U.S.	
27	Win	24–1–1 (1)	Lou Bogash	PTS	15	Feb 13, 1922	Casino Hall, Bridgeport, Massachusetts, U.S.	Won vacant New England middleweight title
26	Win	23–1–1 (1)	Jack McCarron	PTS	10	Jan 27, 1922	Casino Hall, Bridgeport, Massachusetts, U.S.	
25	Win	22–1–1 (1)	Jackie Clark	PTS	10	Jan 2, 1922	Casino, Fall River, Massachusetts, U.S.	
24	Win	21–1–1 (1)	Frank Carbone	PTS	12	Nov 30, 1921	Marieville Gardens, North Providence, Rhode Island, U.S.	
23	Win	20–1–1 (1)	Steve Choynski	PTS	12	Oct 19, 1921	National A.C., Providence, Rhode Island, U.S.	
22	Win	19–1–1 (1)	George Robinson	PTS	12	Sep 28, 1921	National A.C., Providence, Rhode Island, U.S.	
21	Win	18–1–1 (1)	Frankie Fleming	TKO	8 (10)	Sep 13, 1921	Fall River, Massachusetts, U.S.	
20	Win	17–1–1 (1)	Joe Rivers	PTS	10	Aug 22, 1921	Fall River, Massachusetts, U.S.	
19	Win	16–1–1 (1)	Happy Howard	PTS	10	Aug 12, 1921	City Hall, Holyoke, Massachusetts, U.S.	
18	Win	15–1–1 (1)	Bert Colima	TKO	7 (8)	Jul 25, 1921	Ebbets Field, Brooklyn, New York City, New York, U.S.	
17	Win	14–1–1 (1)	Jackie Mason	TKO	2 (10)	Jul 22, 1921	City Hall, Holyoke, Massachusetts, U.S.	
16	Win	13–1–1 (1)	Young Jack Johnson	KO	3 (?)	May 18, 1921	National A.C., Providence, Rhode Island, U.S.	
15	Loss	12–1–1 (1)	Tommy Robson	PTS	12	Apr 13, 1921	Marieville Gardens, North Providence, Rhode Island, U.S.	
14	Win	12–0–1 (1)	Jack McClelland	PTS	12	Mar 14, 1921	Casino Hall, Bridgeport, Connecticut, U.S.	
13	Draw	11–0–1 (1)	Jack McCarron	PTS	12	Feb 22, 1921	National A.C., Providence, Rhode Island, U.S.	
12	Win	11–0 (1)	Jack Savage	KO	2 (?)	Feb 8, 1921	National A.C., Providence, Rhode Island, U.S.	
11	Win	10–0 (1)	Ted Marshall	TKO	6 (10)	Jan 28, 1921	National A.C., Providence, Rhode Island, U.S.	
10	Win	9–0 (1)	Battling Silveira	TKO	9 (10)	Jan 1, 1921	National A.C., Providence, Rhode Island, U.S.	
9	Win	8–0 (1)	Frank D'Annunzio	KO	2 (?)	Dec 8, 1920	National A.C., Providence, Rhode Island, U.S.	
8	Win	7–0 (1)	Art Lago	KO	3 (?)	Sep 30, 1920	Saginaw A.C., Saginaw, Michigan, U.S.	
7	Win	6–0 (1)	Bill Gorman	KO	3 (?)	Jun 1, 1920	Canada	Month & date unknown
6	Win	5–0 (1)	Art Griffin	KO	7 (?)	May 1, 1920	Canada	Month & date unknown
5	Win	4–0 (1)	Tom Spencer	KO	4 (?)	Mar 1, 1920	Canada	Month & date unknown
4	Win	3–0 (1)	Tommy Nelson	KO	2 (10)	Feb 13, 1920	Mission Street Hall, Stamford, Connecticut, U.S.	
3	Win	2–0 (1)	Jim Hugo	PTS	6	Jan 1, 1920	Canada	Month & date unknown
2	Win	1–0 (1)	Steve August	PTS	6	Dec 1, 1919	Canada	Month & date unknown
1	Win	0–0 (1)	Steve August	NWS	4	Oct 9, 1919	Acorn A.C. Gymnasium, Bridgeport, Connecticut, U.S.	

=== Unofficial record ===
90 fights	75 wins	11 losses
By knockout	43	3
By decision	30	8
By disqualification	2	0
Draws	2	
No contests	2	

Record with the inclusion of newspaper decisions in the win/loss/draw column.

No.	Result	Record	Opponent	Type	Round	Date	Location	Notes
90	Win	75–11–2 (2)	Leo Williams	KO	1 (10)	Apr 21, 1932	Foot Guard Hall, Hartford, Connecticut, U.S.	
89	Win	74–11–2 (2)	Cowboy Jack Willis	TKO	3 (10)	Mar 29, 1932	Columbus Hall, Stamford, Connecticut, U.S.	
88	Win	73–11–2 (2)	Phil Johnson	KO	2 (10)	Mar 3, 1932	Red Men's Hall, Bridgeport, Connecticut, U.S.	
87	Win	72–11–2 (2)	Nando Tassi	TKO	11 (15)	Sep 20, 1928	Ebbets Field, Brooklyn, New York City, New York, U.S.	
86	Loss	71–11–2 (2)	Jack Sharkey	KO	1 (15)	Apr 30, 1928	Madison Square Garden, New York City, New York, U.S.	
85	Loss	71–10–2 (2)	Tom Heeney	UD	15	Mar 1, 1928	Madison Square Garden, New York City, New York, U.S.	
84	Win	71–9–2 (2)	Leo Gates	KO	2 (10)	Feb 13, 1928	Edgerton Park Arena, Rochester, New York, U.S.	
83	Win	70–9–2 (2)	Jack Humbeeck	TKO	6 (10)	Jan 20, 1928	Mechanics Building, Boston, Massachusetts, U.S.	
82	Win	69–9–2 (2)	Sully Montgomery	KO	1 (10)	Jan 16, 1928	St. Nicholas Arena, New York City, New York, U.S.	
81	Win	68–9–2 (2)	Paul Berlenbach	TKO	6 (10)	Dec 9, 1927	Coliseum, Chicago, Illinois, U.S.	
80	Win	67–9–2 (2)	Jack Renault	PTS	10	Oct 14, 1927	Madison Square Garden, New York City, New York, U.S.	
79	Loss	66–9–2 (2)	Johnny Risko	PTS	10	Sep 14, 1927	Taylor Bowl, Newburgh Heights, Ohio, U.S.	
78	Win	66–8–2 (2)	Paulino Uzcudun	DQ	7 (10)	Aug 11, 1927	Yankee Stadium, Bronx, New York City, New York, U.S.	
77	Loss	65–8–2 (2)	Jim Maloney	UD	10	Feb 18, 1927	Madison Square Garden, New York City, New York, U.S.	
76	Win	65–7–2 (2)	Bud Gorman	KO	2 (10)	Dec 20, 1926	4th Regiment Armory, Jersey City, New Jersey, U.S.	
75	Win	64–7–2 (2)	Jamaica Kid	TKO	3 (15)	Dec 10, 1926	State Armory, Waterbury, Connecticut, U.S.	Retained NBA, NYSAC, and The Ring light heavyweight titles
74	Win	63–7–2 (2)	Paul Berlenbach	UD	15	Jul 16, 1926	Ebbets Field, Brooklyn, New York City, New York, U.S.	Won NBA, NYSAC, and The Ring light heavyweight titles
73	Win	62–7–2 (2)	Bob Sage	NWS	10	Jun 16, 1926	Coliseum Ring, Detroit, Michigan, U.S.	
72	Win	61–7–2 (2)	Tom Burns	TKO	2 (10)	Jun 3, 1926	Ebbets Field, Brooklyn, New York City, New York, U.S.	
71	Win	60–7–2 (2)	Martin O'Grady	KO	7 (10)	May 12, 1926	Forum, Montreal, Quebec, Canada	
70	Win	59–7–2 (2)	Emilio Solomon	PTS	12	Apr 26, 1926	Foot Guard Hall, Hartford, Connecticut, U.S.	
69	Win	58–7–2 (2)	Maxie Rosenbloom	PTS	10	Mar 22, 1926	Arena, Philadelphia, Pennsylvania, U.S.	
68	Win	57–7–2 (2)	Mike McTigue	TKO	4 (10)	Mar 15, 1926	Madison Square Garden, New York City, New York, U.S.	
67	Win	56–7–2 (2)	Joe Lohman	TKO	10 (12)	Mar 8, 1926	Broadway Arena, Brooklyn, New York City, New York, U.S.	
66	Win	55–7–2 (2)	Quintin Romero Rojas	KO	4 (10)	Feb 22, 1926	Arena, Philadelphia, Pennsylvania, U.S.	
65	Win	54–7–2 (2)	Johnny Risko	PTS	10	Feb 5, 1926	Madison Square Garden, New York City, New York, U.S.	
64	Win	53–7–2 (2)	Tom Roper	TKO	12 (12)	Jan 25, 1926	Canton Auditorium, Canton, Ohio, U.S.	
63	Win	52–7–2 (2)	Young Bob Fitzsimmons	PTS	12	Jan 15, 1926	Madison Square Garden, New York City, New York, U.S.	
62	Loss	51–7–2 (2)	Paul Berlenbach	PTS	15	Dec 11, 1925	Madison Square Garden, New York City, New York, U.S.	For NBA, NYSAC, and The Ring light heavyweight titles
61	Win	51–6–2 (2)	Jack Burke	TKO	9 (12)	Jul 24, 1925	Coney Island Stadium, Brooklyn, New York City, New York, U.S.	
60	Draw	50–6–2 (2)	Tommy Loughran	PTS	10	Jul 16, 1925	Shibe Park, Philadelphia, Pennsylvania, U.S.	
59	Win	50–6–1 (2)	Tony Marullo	UD	12	May 20, 1925	Yankee Stadium, Bronx, New York City, New York, U.S.	
58	Win	49–6–1 (2)	Soldier King	TKO	4 (12)	Mar 20, 1925	Armory, Grand Rapids, Michigan, U.S.	
57	Win	48–6–1 (2)	Jamaica Kid	KO	2 (10)	Mar 9, 1925	Elmwood Music Hall, Buffalo, New York, U.S.	
56	Win	47–6–1 (2)	Tiger Flowers	KO	4 (12)	Feb 26, 1925	Madison Square Garden, New York City, New York, U.S.	
55	Loss	46–6–1 (2)	Jimmy Slattery	PTS	6	Feb 13, 1925	Madison Square Garden, New York City, New York, U.S.	
54	Win	46–5–1 (2)	Allentown Joe Gans	SD	10	Jan 19, 1925	South Main Street Armory, Wilkes-Barre, Pennsylvania, U.S.	
53	Win	45–5–1 (2)	Tiger Flowers	KO	2 (12)	Jan 16, 1925	Madison Square Garden, New York City, New York, U.S.	
52	Win	44–5–1 (2)	Pal Reed	PTS	12	Dec 26, 1924	Madison Square Garden, New York City, New York, U.S.	
51	Win	43–5–1 (2)	George Mulholland	TKO	8 (12)	Oct 30, 1924	Rink S.C., Brooklyn, New York City, New York, U.S.	
50	Win	42–5–1 (2)	Pat McCarthy	DQ	8 (10)	Oct 20, 1924	Arena, Boston, Massachusetts, U.S.	McCarthy was disqualified for "not fighting"
49	Loss	41–5–1 (2)	Jimmy Slattery	PTS	6	Oct 3, 1924	Madison Square Garden, New York City, New York, U.S.	
48	Win	41–4–1 (2)	Frank Moody	TKO	6 (12)	Aug 27, 1924	State Street Arena, Bridgeport, Connecticut, U.S.	
47	Loss	40–4–1 (2)	Bryan Downey	PTS	12	May 5, 1924	Columbus, Ohio, U.S.	
46	Win	40–3–1 (2)	George Robinson	PTS	10	Apr 10, 1924	Mechanics Building, Boston, Massachusetts, U.S.	
45	Win	39–3–1 (2)	Leo Leonard	TKO	3 (12)	Mar 31, 1924	Casino Hall, Bridgeport, Connecticut, U.S.	
44	NC	38–3–1 (2)	Jackie Clark	NC	8 (12)	Mar 17, 1924	113th Regiment Armory, Newark, New Jersey, U.S.	Bout halted for lack of action
43	Win	38–3–1 (1)	Paul Berlenbach	KO	4 (12)	Mar 14, 1924	Madison Square Garden, New York City, New York, U.S.	
42	Win	37–3–1 (1)	Tommy Loughran	PTS	10	Feb 19, 1924	Mechanics Building, Boston, Massachusetts, U.S.	
41	Win	36–3–1 (1)	Sailor Martin	KO	1 (?)	Feb 11, 1924	Lenox A.C., New York City, New York, U.S.	
40	Win	35–3–1 (1)	Jackie Clark	TKO	2 (12)	Jan 4, 1924	Armory, Norwalk, Connecticut, U.S.	
39	Win	34–3–1 (1)	Jimmy Darcy	PTS	10	Aug 31, 1923	Polo Grounds, New York City, New York, U.S.	
38	Win	33–3–1 (1)	Andy Kid Palmer	PTS	12	Aug 20, 1923	State Street Arena, Bridgeport, Connecticut, U.S.	
37	Win	32–3–1 (1)	Tommy Madden	KO	1 (10)	Jul 4, 1923	Falco Field, Holyoke, Massachusetts, U.S.	
36	NC	31–3–1 (1)	Jimmy O'Gatty	NC	5 (10)	Mar 19, 1923	Infantry Hall, Providence, Rhode Island, U.S.	
35	Win	31–3–1	Augie Ratner	PTS	12	Mar 3, 1923	Commonwealth Sporting Club, New York City, New York, U.S.	
34	Win	30–3–1	Italian Joe Gans	PTS	12	Feb 20, 1923	Pioneer Sporting Club, New York City, New York, U.S.	
33	Loss	29–3–1	Young Fisher	TKO	3 (12)	Oct 11, 1922	National A.C., Providence, Rhode Island, U.S.	
32	Win	29–2–1	Frank Cavanaugh	TKO	3 (10)	Oct 6, 1922	Elks' Hall, Stamford, Connecticut, U.S.	
31	Win	28–2–1	George Shade	KO	1 (12)	Aug 14, 1922	Clinton Oval, Woonsocket, Rhode Island, U.S.	
30	Win	27–2–1	Hugh Ross	PTS	15	Apr 10, 1922	Casino, Fall River, Massachusetts, U.S.	
29	Win	26–2–1	Jack Stone	PTS	10	Mar 29, 1922	Casino, Fall River, Massachusetts, U.S.	
28	Loss	25–2–1	Augie Ratner	TKO	1 (12)	Mar 6, 1922	Broadway Arena, Brooklyn, New York City, New York, U.S.	
27	Win	25–1–1	Lou Bogash	PTS	15	Feb 13, 1922	Casino Hall, Bridgeport, Massachusetts, U.S.	Won vacant New England middleweight title
26	Win	24–1–1	Jack McCarron	PTS	10	Jan 27, 1922	Casino Hall, Bridgeport, Massachusetts, U.S.	
25	Win	23–1–1	Jackie Clark	PTS	10	Jan 2, 1922	Casino, Fall River, Massachusetts, U.S.	
24	Win	22–1–1	Frank Carbone	PTS	12	Nov 30, 1921	Marieville Gardens, North Providence, Rhode Island, U.S.	
23	Win	21–1–1	Steve Choynski	PTS	12	Oct 19, 1921	National A.C., Providence, Rhode Island, U.S.	
22	Win	20–1–1	George Robinson	PTS	12	Sep 28, 1921	National A.C., Providence, Rhode Island, U.S.	
21	Win	19–1–1	Frankie Fleming	TKO	8 (10)	Sep 13, 1921	Fall River, Massachusetts, U.S.	
20	Win	18–1–1	Joe Rivers	PTS	10	Aug 22, 1921	Fall River, Massachusetts, U.S.	
19	Win	17–1–1	Happy Howard	PTS	10	Aug 12, 1921	City Hall, Holyoke, Massachusetts, U.S.	
18	Win	16–1–1	Bert Colima	TKO	7 (8)	Jul 25, 1921	Ebbets Field, Brooklyn, New York City, New York, U.S.	
17	Win	15–1–1	Jackie Mason	TKO	2 (10)	Jul 22, 1921	City Hall, Holyoke, Massachusetts, U.S.	
16	Win	14–1–1	Young Jack Johnson	KO	3 (?)	May 18, 1921	National A.C., Providence, Rhode Island, U.S.	
15	Loss	13–1–1	Tommy Robson	PTS	12	Apr 13, 1921	Marieville Gardens, North Providence, Rhode Island, U.S.	
14	Win	13–0–1	Jack McClelland	PTS	12	Mar 14, 1921	Casino Hall, Bridgeport, Connecticut, U.S.	
13	Draw	12–0–1	Jack McCarron	PTS	12	Feb 22, 1921	National A.C., Providence, Rhode Island, U.S.	
12	Win	12–0	Jack Savage	KO	2 (?)	Feb 8, 1921	National A.C., Providence, Rhode Island, U.S.	
11	Win	11–0	Ted Marshall	TKO	6 (10)	Jan 28, 1921	National A.C., Providence, Rhode Island, U.S.	
10	Win	10–0	Battling Silveira	TKO	9 (10)	Jan 1, 1921	National A.C., Providence, Rhode Island, U.S.	
9	Win	9–0	Frank D'Annunzio	KO	2 (?)	Dec 8, 1920	National A.C., Providence, Rhode Island, U.S.	
8	Win	8–0	Art Lago	KO	3 (?)	Sep 30, 1920	Saginaw A.C., Saginaw, Michigan, U.S.	
7	Win	7–0	Bill Gorman	KO	3 (?)	Jun 1, 1920	Canada	Month & date unknown
6	Win	6–0	Art Griffin	KO	7 (?)	May 1, 1920	Canada	Month & date unknown
5	Win	5–0	Tom Spencer	KO	4 (?)	Mar 1, 1920	Canada	Month & date unknown
4	Win	4–0	Tommy Nelson	KO	2 (10)	Feb 13, 1920	Mission Street Hall, Stamford, Connecticut, U.S.	
3	Win	3–0	Jim Hugo	PTS	6	Jan 1, 1920	Canada	Month & date unknown
2	Win	2–0	Steve August	PTS	6	Dec 1, 1919	Canada	Month & date unknown
1	Win	1–0	Steve August	NWS	4	Oct 9, 1919	Acorn A.C. Gymnasium, Bridgeport, Connecticut, U.S.	

== Titles in boxing ==
=== Major world titles ===
- NYSAC light heavyweight champion (175 lbs)
- NBA (WBA) light heavyweight champion (175 lbs)

=== The Ring magazine titles ===
- The Ring light heavyweight champion (175 lbs)

=== Regional/International titles ===
- New England middleweight champion (160 lbs)

=== Undisputed titles ===
- Undisputed light heavyweight champion (175 lbs)

== See also ==
- List of light heavyweight boxing champions

Achievements
Preceded by Paul Berlenbach	World Light Heavyweight Champion; July 16, 1926 – June 1927; Vacated	Vacant Title next held by Tommy Loughran
