= Paul Berlenbach =

American boxer

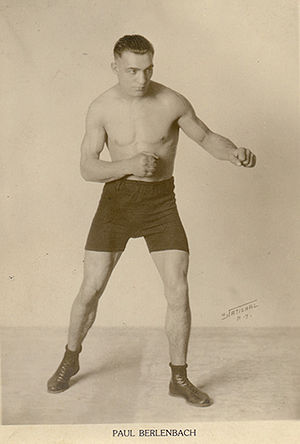

Personal information
- Nickname: Astoria Assassin
- Nationality: American
- Born: Paul Berlenbach; February 18, 1901 New York, New York, United States
- Died: September 30, 1985 (aged 84)
- Height: 5 ft 10 in (1.78 m)
- Weight: Light Heavyweight

Boxing career
- Reach: 72 in (183 cm)
- Stance: Orthodox

Boxing record
- Total fights: 51
- Wins: 40
- Win by KO: 33
- Losses: 8
- Draws: 3
- No contests: 1

Paul Berlenbach (February 18, 1901 – September 30, 1985), nicknamed the Astoria Assassin was the world light heavyweight boxing champion in 1925 and 1926. Known for his punching power, he took the crown from Mike McTigue, until July 16, 1926, when he was defeated by his nemesis Jack Delaney. The Ring Magazine founder Nat Fleischer rated him as the #10 best light heavyweight of all time. Berlenbach was inducted into the Ring Magazine Hall of Fame in 1971 and the International Boxing Hall of Fame in 2001.

== Career ==
Prior to his professional boxing career, Berlenbach had been a champion at amateur wrestling and amateur boxing, both at middleweight. His record as an amateur boxer was 21–0 with 21 knockouts. He made the United States Olympic wrestling team in 1920, but was injured and did not participate.

=== World light heavyweight champion ===
Berlenbach scored a 10th-round TKO over former champion Battling Siki to earn a title shot against champion Mike McTigue. Berlenbach defeated McTigue with a unanimous decision to become light-heavyweight champion.

In his first title defense against Tony "Young" Marullo, the bout was stopped in the 9th round and declared no contest. "(Referee) Lewis was convinced the boxers were pulling their punches. I agreed with Lewis that the bout should be declared 'no contest,'" inspector Platt Adams of the New Jersey Boxing Commission said after the fight. Adams cleared both boxers though, when examination revealed that Berlenbach had broken a bone in his hand.

Berlenbach stopped Jimmy Slattery in his second defense. Next was Jack Delaney, the only fighter who had previously defeated him. After being knocked down in the 4th round, Berlenbach rallied and won on a split decision, with one judge calling the fight a draw.

Against heavyweight Johnny Risko he suffered a surprise loss. A rematch was requested by both fighters, but the request was denied by the New York boxing commission, citing desire for the champion to fight opponents in his own division.

Young Stribling, who had fought Berlenbach to a draw two years before, and also owned a victory over Risko, was given a shot at the light-heavyweight title. Berlenbach won the rematch decisively.

Jack Delaney defeated Paul Berlenbach for the light-heavyweight championship on July 16, 1926, in front of 41,000 spectators. After the victory Delaney said Berlenbach had "the hardest left hand punch I ever took." Berlenbach, "I was never in serious trouble, but I could not land my lefts effectively."

=== Late career ===
"If Berlenbach wants a return bout, he'll get it," Jack Delaney said after his championship win. Instead of seeking a rematch with Delaney for the light-heavyweight title, Paul Berlenbach moved to heavyweight. In his first match at heavyweight he fought Mike McTigue, who Berlenbach had taken the light-heavyweight title from. McTigue won in the 4th round. Berlenbach announced his retirement afterward. However he would return to the ring 5 months later back at light-heavyweight.

After a string of victories at light-heavyweight. He fought the middleweight champion Mickey Walker in a non-title match. Walker won on points, knocked Berlenbach down in the 4th. Berlenbach's 11 pound advantage did not seem to matter.

He fought Jack Delaney for a 4th time, this time in front of only 6,000. Berlenbach was knocked down 3 times before the fight was stopped in the 6th round.

After a match with veteran Larry Estridge in 1928 both boxers had their boxing licenses rescinded. Berlenbach had won in 8 rounds. According to sportswriter James P. Dawson, the fight "proved conclusively to all those in attendance that their days of real boxing are at an end."

In 1929 Paul Berlenbach began a brief career as a professional wrestler.

After multiple unsuccessful returns to the ring in 1931 and again in 1933, Berlenbach finally retired for good.

He retired from boxing with a record of 40 wins (33 KOs), 8 losses, and 3 draws. He was named #93 on the Ring Magazine's list of 100 greatest punchers of all time. Upon his retirement, he owned and operated Paul Berlenbach's Ringside Restaurant in Sound Beach, New York in the 1950s.

== Professional boxing record ==
52 fights	40 wins	8 losses
By knockout	34	3
By decision	6	4
By disqualification	0	1
Draws	3	
Newspaper decisions/draws	1	

All newspaper decisions are officially regarded as “no decision” bouts and are not counted in the win/loss/draw column.

No.	Result	Record	Opponent	Type	Round	Date	Location	Notes
54	Loss	40–8–3 (3)	Carl Knowles	PTS	10	Sep 28, 1933	Atlanta, Georgia, U.S.	
53	NC	40–7–3 (3)	Ray Lopez	NC	2 (?)	Sep 14, 1931	Saint Albans, Vermont, U.S.	The bout was declared NC after Lopez had been floored three times by relatively light punches.
52	Loss	40–7–3 (2)	Herman Weiner	DQ	1 (5)	Jul 22, 1931	Twin City Arena, Laurel, Maryland, U.S.	Berlenbach DQ'd for going down without a blow being struck.
51	Win	40–6–3 (2)	Jerry Garfield	TKO	4 (6)	Jul 9, 1931	Fort Hamilton Arena, Brooklyn, New York City, New York, U.S.	
50	Win	39–6–3 (2)	Billy Henderson	TKO	1 (4)	Apr 13, 1931	Prospect Hall, Brooklyn, New York City, New York, U.S.	
49	Win	38–6–3 (2)	Eddie Clark	KO	3 (4)	Mar 31, 1931	Broadway Arena, Brooklyn, New York City, New York, U.S.	
48	Win	37–6–3 (2)	Larry Estridge	KO	8 (?)	May 22, 1928	Queensboro Stadium, Long Island City, Queens, New York City, New York, U.S.	
47	Win	36–6–3 (2)	Floyd Shimalla	KO	1 (?)	May 12, 1928	Ridgewood Grove, Brooklyn, New York City, New York, U.S.	
46	Loss	35–6–3 (2)	Jack Delaney	TKO	6 (10)	Dec 9, 1927	Coliseum, Chicago, Illinois, U.S.	
45	Loss	35–5–3 (2)	Mickey Walker	PTS	10	Nov 25, 1927	Coliseum, Chicago, Illinois, U.S.	
44	Draw	35–4–3 (2)	Joe Lohman	PTS	10	Oct 13, 1927	Auditorium, Atlanta, Georgia, U.S.	
43	Win	35–4–2 (2)	Bob Lawson	KO	7 (?)	Jul 28, 1927	Madison Square Garden, New York City, New York, U.S.	
42	Win	34–4–2 (2)	Bing Conley	PTS	10	Jul 18, 1927	St. Nicholas Arena, New York City, New York, U.S.	
41	Win	33–4–2 (2)	Gus Berger	TKO	4 (10)	Jul 9, 1927	Ridgewood Grove, Brooklyn, New York City, New York, U.S.	
40	Win	32–4–2 (2)	Charley Rammell	TKO	1 (10)	Jun 27, 1927	St. Nicholas Arena, New York City, New York, U.S.	
39	Loss	31–4–2 (2)	Mike McTigue	TKO	4 (10)	Jan 28, 1927	Madison Square Garden, New York City, New York, U.S.	
38	Win	31–3–2 (2)	Francis Charles	TKO	1 (10)	Aug 20, 1926	Ebbets Field, Brooklyn, New York City, New York, U.S.	
37	Loss	30–3–2 (2)	Jack Delaney	UD	15	Jul 16, 1926	Ebbets Field, Brooklyn, New York City, New York, U.S.	Lost NBA, NYSAC, and The Ring light-heavyweight titles
36	Win	30–2–2 (2)	Young Stribling	UD	15	Jun 10, 1926	Yankee Stadium, Bronx, New York City, New York, U.S.	Retained NBA, NYSAC, and The Ring light-heavyweight titles
35	Win	29–2–2 (2)	Ray Neuman	PTS	10	Apr 5, 1926	Foot Guard Hall, Hartford, Connecticut, U.S.	
34	Loss	28–2–2 (2)	Johnny Risko	PTS	10	Mar 19, 1926	Madison Square Garden, New York City, New York, U.S.	
33	Win	28–1–2 (2)	Jack Delaney	PTS	15	Dec 11, 1925	Madison Square Garden, New York City, New York, U.S.	Retained NBA, NYSAC, and The Ring light-heavyweight titles
32	Win	27–1–2 (2)	Emilio Solomon	TKO	9 (10)	Oct 12, 1925	Polo Grounds, New York City, New York, U.S.	
31	Win	26–1–2 (2)	Jimmy Slattery	TKO	11 (15)	Sep 11, 1925	Yankee Stadium, Bronx, New York City, New York, U.S.	Retained NBA, NYSAC, and The Ring light-heavyweight titles
30	NC	25–1–2 (2)	Tony Marullo	NC	9 (15)	Jul 13, 1925	Dreamland Park, Newark, New Jersey, U.S.	NBA, NYSAC, and The Ring light-heavyweight titles at stake; Both men were disqualified for "not trying"
29	Win	25–1–2 (1)	Mike McTigue	UD	15	May 30, 1925	Yankee Stadium, Bronx, New York City, New York, U.S.	Won NBA and NYSAC, and The Ring light-heavyweight titles
28	Win	24–1–2 (1)	Battling Siki	TKO	10 (12)	Mar 13, 1925	Madison Square Garden, New York City, New York, U.S.	
27	Win	23–1–2 (1)	Frankie Maguire	TKO	5 (10)	Feb 9, 1925	108th Field Artillery Armory, Philadelphia, Pennsylvania, U.S.	
26	Win	22–1–2 (1)	Tony Marullo	PTS	12	Jan 30, 1925	108th Field Artillery Armory, Philadelphia, Pennsylvania, U.S.	
25	Win	21–1–2 (1)	Rocky Smith	TKO	4 (10)	Jan 14, 1925	108th Field Artillery Armory, Philadelphia, Pennsylvania, U.S.	
24	Win	20–1–2 (1)	Larry Estridge	TKO	2 (?)	Dec 26, 1924	Madison Square Garden, New York City, New York, U.S.	
23	Win	19–1–2 (1)	Tom Burns	KO	5 (10)	Dec 5, 1924	Arena Gardens, Detroit, Michigan, U.S.	
22	Win	18–1–2 (1)	Johnny Gill	NWS	10	Oct 1, 1924	Boyle's Thirty Acres, Jersey City, New Jersey, U.S.	
21	Win	18–1–2	Jack Reddick	KO	8 (?)	Sep 19, 1924	Madison Square Garden, New York City, New York, U.S.	
20	Draw	17–1–2	Young Stribling	PTS	6	Aug 27, 1924	Velodrome, New York, U.S.	
19	Win	17–1–1	Hambone Kelly	KO	4 (10)	Aug 15, 1924	Braves Field, Boston, Massachusetts, U.S.	
18	Draw	16–1–1	Augie Ratner	PTS	8	Jul 24, 1924	Polo Grounds, Manhattan, New York City, New York, U.S.	
17	Win	16–1	Frank Carpenter	TKO	7 (10)	Jul 7, 1924	Queensboro Stadium, Long Island City, Queens, New York City, New York, U.S.	
16	Win	15–1	KO Jaffe	TKO	7 (10)	Jun 20, 1924	Henderson's Bowl, Brooklyn New York City, New York, U.S.	
15	Win	14–1	Chief Halbran	TKO	3 (10)	Jun 16, 1924	Bralls Arena, Freeport, New York U.S.	
14	Win	13–1	Harold Abbott	TKO	4 (10)	Apr 29, 1924	Madison Square Garden, New York City, New York, U.S.	
13	Win	12–1	Jack Stone	TKO	5 (12)	Apr 7, 1924	1st Regiment Armory, Newark, U.S.	
12	Win	11–1	Harry Krohn	KO	4 (10)	Mar 31, 1924	1st Regiment Armory, Newark, U.S.	
11	Loss	10–1	Jack Delaney	KO	4 (12)	Mar 14, 1924	Madison Square Garden, New York City, New York, U.S.	
10	Win	10–0	Jimmy Darcy	TKO	3 (12)	Mar 3, 1924	Broadway Arena, Brooklyn, New York City, New York U.S.	
9	Win	9–0	Young Fisher	KO	6 (?)	Feb 28, 1924	Madison Square Garden, New York City, New York, U.S.	
8	Win	8–0	Pat Walsh	TKO	1 (?)	Feb 15, 1924	Madison Square Garden, New York City, New York, U.S.	
7	Win	7–0	Frank Carbone	TKO	6 (8)	Jan 28, 1924	Madison Square Garden, New York City, New York, U.S.	
6	Win	6–0	Lew Chester	KO	2 (6)	Jan 18, 1924	Madison Square Garden, New York City, New York, U.S.	
5	Win	5–0	Billy Ryan	KO	1 (?)	Jan 10, 1924	102nd Medical Regiment Armory, New York, U.S.	
4	Win	4–0	KO Jaffre	KO	7 (?)	Jan 2, 1924	Lenox A.C., New York, U.S.	
3	Win	3–0	Jerome Baird	KO	1 (8)	Dec 13, 1923	102nd Medical Regiment Armory, New York, U.S.	
2	Win	2–0	Charles Hoffman	KO	1 (8)	Nov 29, 1923	102nd Medical Regiment Armory, New York, U.S.	
1	Win	1–0	Jimmy Roberts	KO	1 (8)	Oct 4, 1923	102nd Medical Regiment Armory, New York, U.S.	

== Titles in boxing ==
=== Major world titles ===
- NYSAC light heavyweight champion (175 lbs)
- NBA (WBA) light heavyweight champion (175 lbs)

=== The Ring magazine titles ===
- The Ring light heavyweight champion (175 lbs)

=== Undisputed titles ===
- Undisputed light heavyweight champion

== See also ==
- List of light heavyweight boxing champions

Achievements
Preceded by Mike McTigue	World Light Heavyweight Champion; 30 May 1925 – 16 July 1926	Succeeded by Jack Delaney
