= George Estridge =

English cricketer

George Tyler Estridge (11 August 1835 – 26 June 1862) was an English first-class cricketer active 1859–60 who played for Surrey. He was born in Carshalton and died in Mysore. He played in eight first-class matches. His brother was Henry Estridge.
