= Henry Estridge =

English cricketer, British Army officer and colonial official

Personal information
- Full name: Henry Whatley Estridge
- Born: 10 October 1837; Carshalton, Surrey, England
- Died: 15 January 1902 (aged 64); Witney, Oxfordshire, England
- Batting: Right-handed
- Bowling: Right-arm underarm slow
- Relatives: George Estridge (brother)

Career statistics
Competition	First-class
Matches	1
Runs scored	14
Batting average	7.00
100s/50s	–/–
Top score	14
Catches/stumpings	–/–
- Source: Cricinfo, 3 June 2021

Henry Whatley Estridge (10 October 1837 – 15 January 1902) was an English first-class cricketer, a Royal Indian Navy and British Army officer, Colonial Service official, and naturalist.

The son of George Estridge, he was born at Carshalton in October 1837. Estridge initially served in the Royal Indian Navy, serving in the Anglo-Persian War of 1856–57. He served as a midshipman aboard the sloop Clive, seeing action at the Battle of Bushire in December 1856. Shortly after the conclusion of the conflict, Estridge returned to England where he purchased a commission with the rank of ensign in the 46th Regiment of Foot in September 1859. He later purchased the rank of lieutenant in June 1862, prior to retiring from military service in September 1865. He played first-class cricket for the Gentlemen of the South against the Players of the South at The Oval in 1868. Estridge batted twice during the match, being dismissed for scores of 0 and 14 by Edgar Willsher and James Southerton respectively.

Estridge then proceeded to join the Colonial Service. He resided in the Seychelles from 1876 to 1885, where he was collector of customs at Mahé. While stationed at the Seychelles, he became interested in the flora and fauna of the islands, writing the book Six Years in the Seychelles. From the Seychelles he returned to England in 1885, where he presented a copy of his book to Queen Victoria. He returned to his duties with the Colonial Service in 1886, becoming the receiver and accountant-general for British Bechuanaland from 1886 to 1888. Estridge was a non-resident fellow at the Royal Colonial Institute. Estridge died at Witney in January 1902 and was survived by his wife, Selina Eliza Pye Estridge. His brother, George, was also a first-class cricketer.
