= Larry Estridge =

British boxer

Personal information
- Nationality: British
- Born: Larry Estridge; 27 June 1902 St. Kitts, British West Indies
- Weight: Middleweight

Boxing career
- Stance: Southpaw

Boxing record
- Total fights: 78
- Wins: 52
- Win by KO: 38
- Losses: 24
- Draws: 2

Larry Estridge (born 17 June 1902, St. Kitts, British West Indies) was a middleweight boxer and the last holder of the World Colored Middleweight Championship. The 5'7" middleweight fought out of New York City from 1922 to 1929, racking up a career record of 53 wins against 23 losses and two draws from 1922 to 1929.

Estridge fought African-American middleweight champion Panama Joe Gans for his title on July 26, 1924 at Yankee Stadium, defeating the champ via a unanimous decision in their 10-round bout. After scoring two victories over heavyweight Frank Yarchan, Estridge had a rematch with Gans for the colored title. On 11 August 1924 in Queensboro Stadium in Queens, New York, Estridge defeated Gans on points. It was his last defense of the title, which went into abeyance as African American Tiger Flowers won the world middleweight crown the following year.

Estridge never earned a shot at the world title. His status as a contender began to decline after he lost to future light-heavyweight champion Paul Berlenbach on 26 December 1924. Larry Estridge, who weight 155¾ lbs. to Berlenbach's 163¾ lbs., lost via a T.K.O. in the second round. His record was 38–2–1 at the time. Estridge won his next three fights but lost to Frankie Schoell on 13 March 1925, when they appeared as part of the undercard at Madison Square Garden that was topped by a fight between Berlenbach and former world light-heavyweight champion Battling Siki.

Estridge again won three fights before to losing to Sergeant Sammy Baker on 1 June 1925. He then racked up a record of six victories, three losses and a draw in his next 10 fights before he met Baker again on 7 May 1926. Baker K.O.-ed him in the second round, the first of 13 straight defeats. In his last loss of the streak, and the penultimate fight of his career, his former nemesis Paul Berlenbach K.O.-ed him in the eighth round of their fight on 22 May 1928. His last fight was against lightly regarded Mickey Taylor on 21 February 1929, whom he scored a T.K.O. against in the fifth round.

== Professional boxing record ==
All information in this section is derived from BoxRec, unless otherwise stated.

=== Official record ===
78 fights	51 wins	21 losses
By knockout	38	8
By decision	12	13
By disqualification	1	0
Draws	2	
Newspaper decisions/draws	4	

All newspaper decisions are officially regarded as “no decision” bouts and are not counted in the win/loss/draw column.

No.	Result	Record	Opponent	Type	Round, time	Date	Location	Notes
78	Win	51–21–2 (4)	Mickey Taylor	TKO	5 (?)	Feb 21, 1929	Armory, White Plains, New York, US	
77	Loss	50–21–2 (4)	Paul Berlenbach	RTD	7 (10)	May 22, 1928	Queensboro Stadium, New York City, New York, US	The physician did not allow Estridge to come out for the 8th round
76	Loss	50–20–2 (4)	Frank Konchina	TKO	3 (8)	May 8, 1928	22nd Engineers' Armory, New York City, New York, US	
75	Loss	50–19–2 (4)	Frank Konchina	PTS	6	Feb 24, 1928	Armory, Kingston, Pennsylvania, US	
74	Loss	50–18–2 (4)	Bernie Hufnagle	PTS	6	Jan 19, 1928	27th Division Train Armory, New York City, New York, US	
73	Loss	50–17–2 (4)	Walter Hogan	PTS	8	Apr 7, 1927	Columbus Hall, Yonkers, New York, US	
72	Loss	50–16–2 (4)	Joe Cavalier	TKO	7 (10)	Nov 9, 1926	Lyceum Theatre, Paterson, New Jersey, US	
71	Loss	50–15–2 (4)	Frankie Schöell	PTS	10	Oct 25, 1926	Broadway Auditorium, Buffalo, New York, US	
70	Loss	50–14–2 (4)	Billy Franklin	PTS	12	Oct 7, 1926	102nd Medical Regiment Armory, New York City, New York, US	
69	Loss	50–13–2 (4)	Phil Kaplan	TKO	3 (10)	Jul 30, 1926	Taylor Bowl, Newburgh Heights, Ohio, US	
68	Loss	50–12–2 (4)	Esteban Gallard	PTS	15	Jul 4, 1926	Havana, Cuba	
67	Loss	50–11–2 (4)	George Courtney	TKO	4 (10)	Jun 29, 1926	Dreamland Park, Newark, New Jersey, US	
66	Loss	50–10–2 (4)	Harry Galfund	KO	8 (12)	Jun 9, 1926	Bayonne, Louisiana, US	
65	Loss	50–9–2 (4)	'Sergeant' Sammy Baker	KO	2 (?)	May 7, 1926	Madison Square Garden, New York City, New York, US	
64	Win	50–8–2 (4)	Mike Schultz	PTS	10	Mar 29, 1926	Town Hall, Scranton, Pennsylvania, US	
63	Win	49–8–2 (4)	Freddie Krebs	KO	5 (?)	Dec 7, 1925	Bayonne, Louisiana, US	
62	Win	48–8–2 (4)	Joe Senter	KO	6 (10)	Oct 29, 1925	Kanter's Auditorium, Passaic, New Jersey, US	
61	Loss	47–8–2 (4)	Young Fisher	PTS	10	Oct 23, 1925	Arena, Syracuse, New York, US	
60	Loss	47–7–2 (4)	Frank Moody	PTS	12	Oct 9, 1925	Pioneer Sporting Club, New York City, New York, US	
59	Win	47–6–2 (4)	Charley Murray	KO	7 (?)	Sep 22, 1925	27th Division Train Armory, New York City, New York, US	
58	Win	46–6–2 (4)	Young Fisher	TKO	10 (?)	Sep 4, 1925	Bayonne, Louisiana, US	
57	Loss	45–6–2 (4)	Lew Chester	PTS	12	Aug 24, 1925	Golden City Arena, New York City, New York, US	
56	Draw	45–5–2 (4)	'Italian' Joe Gans	PTS	12	Jul 24, 1925	Coney Island Stadium, New York City, New York, US	
55	Win	45–5–1 (4)	Harry Martone	KO	4 (?)	Jul 17, 1925	Bayonne, Louisiana, US	
54	Loss	44–5–1 (4)	'Sergeant' Sammy Baker	PTS	12	Jun 1, 1925	Queensboro Stadium, New York City, New York, US	
53	Win	44–4–1 (4)	Mike Dempsey	KO	8 (12)	May 26, 1925	Albany, New York, US	
52	Win	43–4–1 (4)	Charley Picker	KO	3 (12)	May 19, 1925	Pioneer Sporting Club, New York City, New York, US	
51	Win	42–4–1 (4)	Mike Dempsey	KO	8 (?)	Mar 26, 1925	Albany, New York, US	
50	Loss	41–4–1 (4)	Frankie Schöell	PTS	10	Mar 13, 1925	Madison Square Garden, New York City, New York, US	
49	Win	41–3–1 (4)	George Bowland	KO	1 (12)	Feb 25, 1925	102nd Engineers Armory, New York City, New York, US	
48	Win	40–3–1 (4)	Warnie Smith	TKO	6 (12)	Feb 13, 1925	Madison Square Garden, New York City, New York, US	
47	Win	39–3–1 (4)	Charley Nashert	KO	2 (?)	Jan 16, 1925	Madison Square Garden, New York City, New York, US	
46	Loss	38–3–1 (4)	Paul Berlenbach	TKO	2 (?)	Dec 26, 1924	Madison Square Garden, New York City, New York, US	
45	Win	38–2–1 (4)	Rocky Smith	KO	1 (?)	Dec 16, 1924	Bayonne, Louisiana, US	
44	Win	37–2–1 (4)	Dave Rosenberg	PTS	12	Nov 22, 1924	Commonwealth Sporting Club, New York City, New York, US	
43	Win	36–2–1 (4)	Mike Morley	KO	2 (10)	Nov 8, 1924	Commonwealth Sporting Club, New York City, New York, US	
42	Win	35–2–1 (4)	Henry Shaw	PTS	10	Oct 27, 1924	Columbus Hall, Yonkers, New York, US	
41	Win	34–2–1 (4)	Young Fisher	TKO	10 (10)	Sep 4, 1924	Bayonne, Louisiana, US	
40	Win	33–2–1 (4)	Panama Joe Gans	PTS	10	Aug 11, 1924	Queensboro Stadium, New York City, New York, US	Retained world colored middleweight title
39	Win	32–2–1 (4)	Frank Yarchan	PTS	6	Aug 2, 1924	Ridgewood Grove, New York City, New York, US	
38	Win	31–2–1 (4)	Frank Yarchan	PTS	6	Jul 1, 1924	New York City, New York, US	
37	Win	30–2–1 (4)	Panama Joe Gans	UD	10	Jun 26, 1924	Yankee Stadium, New York City, New York, US	Won world colored middleweight title
36	Win	29–2–1 (4)	Tommy Robson	DQ	6 (12)	Jun 6, 1924	Pioneer Sporting Club, New York City, New York, US	Robson DQ'd for low blows
35	Win	28–2–1 (4)	Rocky Smith	KO	5 (?)	May 31, 1924	Commonwealth Sporting Club, New York City, New York, US	
34	Win	27–2–1 (4)	Jack Ford	KO	3 (?)	May 1, 1924	Rink S.C., New York City, New York, US	
33	Win	26–2–1 (4)	Jimmy Amato	TKO	2 (12)	Apr 8, 1924	Pioneer Sporting Club, New York City, New York, US	
32	Win	25–2–1 (4)	Jack Perry	KO	7 (10)	Mar 25, 1924	27th Division Train Armory, New York City, New York, US	
31	Win	24–2–1 (4)	'Sergeant' Jack Lynch	PTS	12	Mar 15, 1924	Commonwealth Sporting Club, New York City, New York, US	
30	Loss	23–2–1 (4)	Augie Ratner	PTS	12	Mar 1, 1924	Commonwealth Sporting Club, New York City, New York, US	
29	Draw	23–1–1 (4)	'Sergeant' Jack Lynch	PTS	12	Feb 16, 1924	Commonwealth Sporting Club, New York City, New York, US	
28	Loss	23–1 (4)	Ted Moore	PTS	12	Jan 19, 1924	Commonwealth Sporting Club, New York City, New York, US	
27	Win	23–0 (4)	Frank Carbone	PTS	12	Dec 29, 1923	Commonwealth Sporting Club, New York City, New York, US	
26	Win	22–0 (4)	'Guardsman' George West	KO	8 (12)	Dec 15, 1923	Commonwealth Sporting Club, New York City, New York, US	
25	Win	21–0 (4)	Willie Walker	KO	2 (12)	Nov 24, 1923	Commonwealth Sporting Club, New York City, New York, US	
24	Win	20–0 (4)	Jerry Hayes	NWS	8	Nov 16, 1923	National A.C., Philadelphia, Pennsylvania, US	
23	Loss	20–0 (3)	Joe Libby	NWS	8	Oct 26, 1923	National A.C., Philadelphia, Pennsylvania, US	
22	Loss	20–0 (2)	'Allentown' Joe Gans	NWS	6	Aug 29, 1923	South Main Street Armory, Wilkes-Barre, Pennsylvania, US	
21	Win	20–0 (1)	Jerome Baird	KO	2 (?)	Aug 11, 1923	102nd Medical Regiment Armory, New York, New York, US	
20	Win	19–0 (1)	Morty Seligman	KO	3 (10)	Aug 4, 1923	Commonwealth Sporting Club, New York City, New York, US	
19	Win	18–0 (1)	Chief Halbran	KO	2 (?)	Jul 10, 1923	Exact location unknown	Exact date unknown
18	Win	17–0 (1)	Jimmy Brown	KO	2 (?)	Jul 1, 1923	Exact location unknown	Exact date unknown
17	Win	16–0 (1)	Joe Cavalier	KO	3 (?)	Jun 10, 1923	Exact location unknown	Exact date unknown
16	Win	15–0 (1)	Tony Jamison	KO	3 (?)	Jun 1, 1923	Exact location unknown	Exact date unknown
15	Loss	14–0 (1)	Sailor Darden	NWS	12	May 28, 1923	Harrison, New Jersey, US	
14	Win	14–0	Pete Coleman	PTS	6	May 24, 1923	Columbus Hall, Yonkers, New York, US	
13	Win	13–0	Frankie Smith	KO	2 (?)	May 1, 1923	Exact location unknown	Exact date unknown
12	Win	12–0	James Thomas	KO	1 (?)	Apr 24, 1923	McGuigan's Arena, Harrison, New Jersey, US	
11	Win	11–0	Jack Herbert	KO	1 (?)	Apr 17, 1923	Harrison, New Jersey, US	
10	Win	10–0	Eddie Hugh	KO	3 (?)	Apr 1, 1923	Exact location unknown	Exact date unknown
9	Win	9–0	Jimmy Brown	KO	2 (?)	Mar 1, 1923	Location unknown	Exact date unknown
8	Win	8–0	Charley Arthurs	KO	3 (?), 1:27	Feb 17, 1923	Commonwealth Sporting Club, New York City, New York, US	
7	Win	7–0	Alex Gibbons	PTS	12	Feb 6, 1923	15th Regiment Armory, New York City, New York, US	
6	Win	6–0	Sam Branch	KO	1 (?)	Jan 2, 1923	15th Regiment Armory, New York City, New York, US	
5	Win	5–0	Alex Gibbons	PTS	12	Nov 21, 1922	15th Regiment Armory, New York City, New York, US	
4	Win	4–0	Johnny Hart	KO	1 (8)	Nov 7, 1922	15th Regiment Armory, New York City, New York, US	
3	Win	3–0	Tommy Hansom	KO	1 (?)	Oct 17, 1922	15th Regiment Armory, New York City, New York, US	
2	Win	2–0	Kid Jackson	KO	2 (10)	Oct 6, 1922	15th Regiment Armory, New York City, New York, US	
1	Win	1–0	Kid Slocum	KO	3 (6)	Sep 22, 1922	15th Regiment Armory, New York City, New York, US	

=== Unofficial record ===
78 fights	52 wins	24 losses
By knockout	38	8
By decision	13	16
By disqualification	1	0
Draws	2	

Record with the inclusion of newspaper decisions in the win/loss/draw column.

No.	Result	Record	Opponent	Type	Round, time	Date	Location	Notes
78	Win	52–24–2	Mickey Taylor	TKO	5 (?)	Feb 21, 1929	Armory, White Plains, New York, US	
77	Loss	51–24–2	Paul Berlenbach	RTD	7 (10)	May 22, 1928	Queensboro Stadium, New York City, New York, US	The physician did not allow Estridge to come out for the 8th round
76	Loss	51–23–2	Frank Konchina	TKO	3 (8)	May 8, 1928	22nd Engineers' Armory, New York City, New York, US	
75	Loss	51–22–2	Frank Konchina	PTS	6	Feb 24, 1928	Armory, Kingston, Pennsylvania, US	
74	Loss	51–21–2	Bernie Hufnagle	PTS	6	Jan 19, 1928	27th Division Train Armory, New York City, New York, US	
73	Loss	51–20–2	Walter Hogan	PTS	8	Apr 7, 1927	Columbus Hall, Yonkers, New York, US	
72	Loss	51–19–2	Joe Cavalier	TKO	7 (10)	Nov 9, 1926	Lyceum Theatre, Paterson, New Jersey, US	
71	Loss	51–18–2	Frankie Schöell	PTS	10	Oct 25, 1926	Broadway Auditorium, Buffalo, New York, US	
70	Loss	51–17–2	Billy Franklin	PTS	12	Oct 7, 1926	102nd Medical Regiment Armory, New York City, New York, US	
69	Loss	51–16–2	Phil Kaplan	TKO	3 (10)	Jul 30, 1926	Taylor Bowl, Newburgh Heights, Ohio, US	
68	Loss	51–15–2	Esteban Gallard	PTS	15	Jul 4, 1926	Havana, Cuba	
67	Loss	51–14–2	George Courtney	TKO	4 (10)	Jun 29, 1926	Dreamland Park, Newark, New Jersey, US	
66	Loss	51–13–2	Harry Galfund	KO	8 (12)	Jun 9, 1926	Bayonne, Louisiana, US	
65	Loss	51–12–2	'Sergeant' Sammy Baker	KO	2 (?)	May 7, 1926	Madison Square Garden, New York City, New York, US	
64	Win	51–11–2	Mike Schultz	PTS	10	Mar 29, 1926	Town Hall, Scranton, Pennsylvania, US	
63	Win	50–11–2	Freddie Krebs	KO	5 (?)	Dec 7, 1925	Bayonne, Louisiana, US	
62	Win	49–11–2	Joe Senter	KO	6 (10)	Oct 29, 1925	Kanter's Auditorium, Passaic, New Jersey, US	
61	Loss	48–11–2	Young Fisher	PTS	10	Oct 23, 1925	Arena, Syracuse, New York, US	
60	Loss	48–10–2	Frank Moody	PTS	12	Oct 9, 1925	Pioneer Sporting Club, New York City, New York, US	
59	Win	48–9–2	Charley Murray	KO	7 (?)	Sep 22, 1925	27th Division Train Armory, New York City, New York, US	
58	Win	47–9–2	Young Fisher	TKO	10 (?)	Sep 4, 1925	Bayonne, Louisiana, US	
57	Loss	46–9–2	Lew Chester	PTS	12	Aug 24, 1925	Golden City Arena, New York City, New York, US	
56	Draw	46–8–2	'Italian' Joe Gans	PTS	12	Jul 24, 1925	Coney Island Stadium, New York City, New York, US	
55	Win	46–8–1	Harry Martone	KO	4 (?)	Jul 17, 1925	Bayonne, Louisiana, US	
54	Loss	45–8–1	'Sergeant' Sammy Baker	PTS	12	Jun 1, 1925	Queensboro Stadium, New York City, New York, US	
53	Win	45–7–1	Mike Dempsey	KO	8 (12)	May 26, 1925	Albany, New York, US	
52	Win	44–7–1	Charley Picker	KO	3 (12)	May 19, 1925	Pioneer Sporting Club, New York City, New York, US	
51	Win	43–7–1	Mike Dempsey	KO	8 (?)	Mar 26, 1925	Albany, New York, US	
50	Loss	42–7–1	Frankie Schöell	PTS	10	Mar 13, 1925	Madison Square Garden, New York City, New York, US	
49	Win	42–6–1	George Bowland	KO	1 (12)	Feb 25, 1925	102nd Engineers Armory, New York City, New York, US	
48	Win	41–6–1	Warnie Smith	TKO	6 (12)	Feb 13, 1925	Madison Square Garden, New York City, New York, US	
47	Win	40–6–1	Charley Nashert	KO	2 (?)	Jan 16, 1925	Madison Square Garden, New York City, New York, US	
46	Loss	39–6–1	Paul Berlenbach	TKO	2 (?)	Dec 26, 1924	Madison Square Garden, New York City, New York, US	
45	Win	39–5–1	Rocky Smith	KO	1 (?)	Dec 16, 1924	Bayonne, Louisiana, US	
44	Win	38–5–1	Dave Rosenberg	PTS	12	Nov 22, 1924	Commonwealth Sporting Club, New York City, New York, US	
43	Win	37–5–1	Mike Morley	KO	2 (10)	Nov 8, 1924	Commonwealth Sporting Club, New York City, New York, US	
42	Win	36–5–1	Henry Shaw	PTS	10	Oct 27, 1924	Columbus Hall, Yonkers, New York, US	
41	Win	35–5–1	Young Fisher	TKO	10 (10)	Sep 4, 1924	Bayonne, Louisiana, US	
40	Win	34–5–1	Panama Joe Gans	PTS	10	Aug 11, 1924	Queensboro Stadium, New York City, New York, US	Retained world colored middleweight title
39	Win	33–5–1	Frank Yarchan	PTS	6	Aug 2, 1924	Ridgewood Grove, New York City, New York, US	
38	Win	32–5–1	Frank Yarchan	PTS	6	Jul 1, 1924	New York City, New York, US	
37	Win	31–5–1	Panama Joe Gans	UD	10	Jun 26, 1924	Yankee Stadium, New York City, New York, US	Won world colored middleweight title
36	Win	30–5–1	Tommy Robson	DQ	6 (12)	Jun 6, 1924	Pioneer Sporting Club, New York City, New York, US	Robson DQ'd for low blows
35	Win	29–5–1	Rocky Smith	KO	5 (?)	May 31, 1924	Commonwealth Sporting Club, New York City, New York, US	
34	Win	28–5–1	Jack Ford	KO	3 (?)	May 1, 1924	Rink S.C., New York City, New York, US	
33	Win	27–5–1	Jimmy Amato	TKO	2 (12)	Apr 8, 1924	Pioneer Sporting Club, New York City, New York, US	
32	Win	26–5–1	Jack Perry	KO	7 (10)	Mar 25, 1924	27th Division Train Armory, New York City, New York, US	
31	Win	25–5–1	'Sergeant' Jack Lynch	PTS	12	Mar 15, 1924	Commonwealth Sporting Club, New York City, New York, US	
30	Loss	24–5–1	Augie Ratner	PTS	12	Mar 1, 1924	Commonwealth Sporting Club, New York City, New York, US	
29	Draw	24–4–1	'Sergeant' Jack Lynch	PTS	12	Feb 16, 1924	Commonwealth Sporting Club, New York City, New York, US	
28	Loss	24–4	Ted Moore	PTS	12	Jan 19, 1924	Commonwealth Sporting Club, New York City, New York, US	
27	Win	24–3	Frank Carbone	PTS	12	Dec 29, 1923	Commonwealth Sporting Club, New York City, New York, US	
26	Win	23–3	'Guardsman' George West	KO	8 (12)	Dec 15, 1923	Commonwealth Sporting Club, New York City, New York, US	
25	Win	22–3	Willie Walker	KO	2 (12)	Nov 24, 1923	Commonwealth Sporting Club, New York City, New York, US	
24	Win	21–3	Jerry Hayes	NWS	8	Nov 16, 1923	National A.C., Philadelphia, Pennsylvania, US	
23	Loss	20–3	Joe Libby	NWS	8	Oct 26, 1923	National A.C., Philadelphia, Pennsylvania, US	
22	Loss	20–2	'Allentown' Joe Gans	NWS	6	Aug 29, 1923	South Main Street Armory, Wilkes-Barre, Pennsylvania, US	
21	Win	20–1	Jerome Baird	KO	2 (?)	Aug 11, 1923	102nd Medical Regiment Armory, New York, New York, US	
20	Win	19–1	Morty Seligman	KO	3 (10)	Aug 4, 1923	Commonwealth Sporting Club, New York City, New York, US	
19	Win	18–1	Chief Halbran	KO	2 (?)	Jul 10, 1923	Exact location unknown	Exact date unknown
18	Win	17–1	Jimmy Brown	KO	2 (?)	Jul 1, 1923	Exact location unknown	Exact date unknown
17	Win	16–1	Joe Cavalier	KO	3 (?)	Jun 10, 1923	Exact location unknown	Exact date unknown
16	Win	15–1	Tony Jamison	KO	3 (?)	Jun 1, 1923	Exact location unknown	Exact date unknown
15	Loss	14–1	Sailor Darden	NWS	12	May 28, 1923	Harrison, New Jersey, US	
14	Win	14–0	Pete Coleman	PTS	6	May 24, 1923	Columbus Hall, Yonkers, New York, US	
13	Win	13–0	Frankie Smith	KO	2 (?)	May 1, 1923	Exact location unknown	Exact date unknown
12	Win	12–0	James Thomas	KO	1 (?)	Apr 24, 1923	McGuigan's Arena, Harrison, New Jersey, US	
11	Win	11–0	Jack Herbert	KO	1 (?)	Apr 17, 1923	Harrison, New Jersey, US	
10	Win	10–0	Eddie Hugh	KO	3 (?)	Apr 1, 1923	Exact location unknown	Exact date unknown
9	Win	9–0	Jimmy Brown	KO	2 (?)	Mar 1, 1923	Location unknown	Exact date unknown
8	Win	8–0	Charley Arthurs	KO	3 (?), 1:27	Feb 17, 1923	Commonwealth Sporting Club, New York City, New York, US	
7	Win	7–0	Alex Gibbons	PTS	12	Feb 6, 1923	15th Regiment Armory, New York City, New York, US	
6	Win	6–0	Sam Branch	KO	1 (?)	Jan 2, 1923	15th Regiment Armory, New York City, New York, US	
5	Win	5–0	Alex Gibbons	PTS	12	Nov 21, 1922	15th Regiment Armory, New York City, New York, US	
4	Win	4–0	Johnny Hart	KO	1 (8)	Nov 7, 1922	15th Regiment Armory, New York City, New York, US	
3	Win	3–0	Tommy Hansom	KO	1 (?)	Oct 17, 1922	15th Regiment Armory, New York City, New York, US	
2	Win	2–0	Kid Jackson	KO	2 (10)	Oct 6, 1922	15th Regiment Armory, New York City, New York, US	
1	Win	1–0	Kid Slocum	KO	3 (6)	Sep 22, 1922	15th Regiment Armory, New York City, New York, US	

Awards and achievements
Preceded by Panama Joe Gans	World Colored Middleweight Champ; July 26, 1924 - Unknown	Title became extinct after Tiger Flowers won World Middleweight title
