= Young Peter Jackson (boxer, born 1877) =

American boxer (1877–1923)

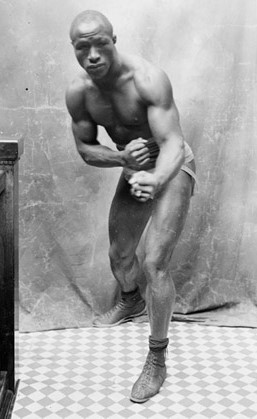

Personal information
- Nickname: The Baltimore Demon
- Born: Sim Thompkins; October 31, 1877 Baltimore, Maryland, U.S.
- Died: September 14, 1923 (aged 45) Baltimore, Maryland, U.S.
- Height: 5 ft 6 in (1.68 m)
- Weight: Welterweight

Boxing career
- Reach: 70 in (178 cm)

Boxing record
- Total fights: 153
- Wins: 83
- Win by KO: 59
- Losses: 36
- Draws: 30
- No contests: 4

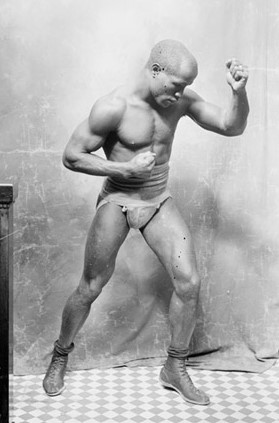
Jackson in fighting pose

Young Peter Jackson (31 October 1877 – 14 September 1923) was a boxer active between 1895 and 1914. During his career, he was able to achieve victories over some of the most storied fighters of all-time, including Sam Langford, Barbados Joe Walcott, Philadelphia Jack O'Brien, and Mysterious Billy Smith. He also squared off against the legendary Jack Johnson in a bout for the latter's World "Colored" Heavyweight Title.

Born Sim Thompkins in Baltimore, Maryland, he named himself after the great colored heavyweight bare-knuckle champ Peter Jackson when he became a practitioner of the sweet science. Known as "The Baltimore Demon", the 5'6" boxer fought at a weight of between 148 and 160 lbs. In his career, he racked up an official record of 78 wins (59 via knock out) against 24 losses (2 via knock out) and 28 draws. He also had a record of 5–10–2 in newspaper decisions.

== Professional boxing record ==
All information in this section is derived from BoxRec, unless otherwise stated.

=== Official record ===
153 fights	78 wins	26 losses
By knockout	59	4
By decision	14	17
By disqualification	5	5
Draws	28	
No contests	4	
Newspaper decisions/draws	17	

All newspaper decisions are officially regarded as "no decision" bouts and are not counted in the win/loss/draw column.

No.	Result	Record	Opponent	Type	Round	Date	Location	Notes
153	Loss	78–26–28 (21)	Jim Downing	PTS	10	Dec 10, 1914	Forest Park Arena, Boise, Idaho, U.S.	
152	Win	78–25–28 (21)	Henry Petty	KO	3 (?)	Jun 12, 1914	Airdome, Price, Utah, U.S.	
151	Loss	77–25–28 (21)	Jack Downey	DQ	9 (20)	Apr 15, 1914	Price, Utah, U.S.	Apr 27?
150	Draw	77–24–28 (21)	Jack Duarte	PTS	20	Apr 13, 1914	Eureka, Utah, U.S.	
149	Draw	77–24–27 (21)	Jack Downey	PTS	6	Mar 31, 1914	Bingham, Utah, U.S.	
148	Win	77–24–26 (21)	Mike Queenan	KO	1 (10)	Mar 16, 1914	Tooele, Utah, U.S.	
147	Draw	76–24–26 (21)	Ike Cohen	PTS	10	Oct 30, 1913	Boise, Idaho, U.S.	
146	Win	76–24–25 (21)	Jack Downey	KO	8 (?)	Sep 1, 1913	Park City, Utah, U.S.	
145	ND	75–24–25 (21)	Dave Mills	ND	6	Aug 2, 1913	United States of America	Date not certain
144	Win	75–24–25 (20)	Joe Clark	PTS	10	Feb 8, 1913	Opera House, Eureka, Utah, U.S.	
143	Loss	74–24–25 (20)	Bert Whirlwind	KO	2 (6)	Jan 12, 1912	American A.C., Philadelphia, Pennsylvania, U.S.	
142	Loss	74–23–25 (20)	Jack Fink	NWS	6	Jan 11, 1912	Broadway A.C., Philadelphia, Pennsylvania, U.S.	
141	Loss	74–23–25 (19)	Billy Ryan	TKO	4 (6)	Dec 26, 1911	Douglas A.C., Philadelphia, Pennsylvania, U.S.	
140	Win	74–22–25 (19)	Barney Malone	TKO	3 (6)	Oct 18, 1911	American A.C., Philadelphia, Pennsylvania, U.S.	
139	Draw	73–22–25 (19)	Harry Cyrus	NWS	6	Sep 25, 1911	American A.C., Philadelphia, Pennsylvania, U.S.	
138	Draw	73–22–25 (18)	Morgan Williams	PTS	10	Jul 3, 1911	Trocadero Hall, Murray, Utah, U.S.	
137	Draw	73–22–24 (18)	Jack Rogers	PTS	10	May 9, 1911	Trocadero Hall, Murray, Utah, U.S.	
136	Loss	73–22–23 (18)	John Willie	PTS	15	Apr 25, 1911	Auditorium Rink, Saskatoon, Saskatchewan, Canada	
135	Loss	73–21–23 (18)	Tim O'Neil	DQ	2 (10)	Nov 26, 1909	West Oakland Club, Oakland, California, U.S.	Jackson grabbed him by the leg and dragged his opponent to the floor after suffering a knockdown, whereupon the referee DQ'd him
134	Loss	73–20–23 (18)	Gunboat Smith	PTS	10	Nov 10, 1909	Piedmont Pavilion, Oakland, California, U.S.	
133	Win	73–19–23 (18)	Al Neill	PTS	10	Sep 29, 1909	West Oakland Club, Oakland, California, U.S.	
132	Win	72–19–23 (18)	Jack Burke	KO	2 (20)	Sep 6, 1909	Coliseum Pavilion, San Francisco, California, U.S.	
131	NC	71–19–23 (18)	Al Neill	NC	7 (20)	Sep 7, 1908	New Goldfield A.C., Goldfield, Nevada, U.S.	Police stopped it, believing it to be a fake bout and the fans lost their admission when the promoter skipped out with the gate receipts
130	NC	71–19–23 (17)	Dick Sullivan	NC	17 (20)	Jan 28, 1908	Marysville A.C., Marysville, California, U.S.	Apparently, after taking a beating from Jackson, Sullivan huddled with him and made a deal to go the distance
129	Win	71–19–23 (16)	Tom Reilly	KO	7 (?)	Nov 28, 1907	Sacramento, California, U.S.	
128	Loss	70–19–23 (16)	Sam Langford	PTS	20	Nov 12, 1907	Pacific A.C., Los Angeles, California, U.S.	For vacant world colored middleweight title
127	Win	70–18–23 (16)	Terry Mustain	KO	17	Sep 2, 1907	Goldfield, Nevada, U.S.	A finish fight
126	Win	69–18–23 (16)	Ed Butte	DQ	4 (?)	May 15, 1907	Portsmouth, Virginia, U.S.	
125	Loss	68–18–23 (16)	Joe Jennette	NWS	6	Mar 8, 1907	Spring Garden A.C., Philadelphia, Pennsylvania, U.S.	
124	Draw	68–18–23 (15)	Black Bill	PTS	8	Feb 9, 1907	Baltimore A.C., Baltimore, Maryland, U.S.	
123	Loss	68–18–22 (15)	Sam Langford	PTS	15	Nov 21, 1906	Rochester, New York, U.S.	
122	Loss	68–17–22 (15)	Professor Mike Donovan	DQ	9 (?)	Oct 26, 1906	Rochester, New York, U.S.	
121	Win	68–16–22 (15)	Sam Langford	TKO	5 (?)	Jun 13, 1906	Southbridge, Massachusetts, U.S.	
120	Loss	67–16–22 (15)	Jack Johnson	NWS	12	Dec 1, 1905	Germania Maennerchor Hall, Baltimore, Maryland, U.S.	World colored heavyweight title at stake; (via KO only)
119	Draw	67–16–22 (14)	Sam Langford	PTS	15	Sep 29, 1905	Germania Maennerchor Hall, Baltimore, Maryland, U.S.	
118	Loss	67–16–21 (14)	Sam Langford	PTS	15	Jun 16, 1905	Douglas A.C., Chelsea, Massachusetts, U.S.	
117	Loss	67–15–21 (14)	Sam Langford	PTS	15	May 26, 1905	Highland A.C., Marlborough, Massachusetts, U.S.	
116	Win	67–14–21 (14)	Larry Temple	NWS	12	May 15, 1905	Nonpareil A.C., Sharon, Pennsylvania, U.S.	
115	Loss	67–14–21 (13)	Philadelphia Jack O'Brien	PTS	10	Apr 7, 1905	4th Regiment Armory, Baltimore, Maryland, U.S.	For world middleweight title claim
114	Loss	67–13–21 (13)	Philadelphia Jack O'Brien	DQ	2 (15)	Mar 24, 1905	4th Regiment Armory, Baltimore, Maryland, U.S.	For world and American middleweight title claims; Jackson accidentally knocked out referee O'Hara as he was breaking a clinch between the fighters
113	Draw	67–12–21 (13)	Dixie Kid	PTS	15	Dec 26, 1904	Germania Maennerchor Hall, Baltimore, Maryland, U.S.	
112	Win	67–12–20 (13)	Charlie Allum	KO	6 (15)	Nov 21, 1904	Wonderland, Whitechapel Road, Mile End, London, England, U.K.	
111	Win	66–12–20 (13)	Jack Scales	TKO	4 (?)	Oct 24, 1904	Ginnetts Circus, Newcastle, Tyne and Wear, England, U.K.	
110	Win	65–12–20 (13)	Harry Barrett	TKO	2 (6)	Oct 3, 1904	National Sporting Club, Covent Garden, London, England, U.K.	
109	Win	64–12–20 (13)	Charlie Knock	KO	3 (15)	Sep 26, 1904	Wonderland, Whitechapel Road, Mile End, London, England, U.K.	Billed for world 148lbs title
108	Win	63–12–20 (13)	Harry Slounch Dixon	KO	2 (6)	Aug 27, 1904	Wonderland, Whitechapel Road, Mile End, London, England, U.K.	
107	Win	62–12–20 (13)	Private Casling	TKO	2 (6)	Aug 6, 1904	Wonderland, Whitechapel Road, Mile End, London, England, U.K.	
106	Win	61–12–20 (13)	Barbados Joe Walcott	KO	4 (10)	Jun 10, 1904	Germania Maennerchor Hall, Baltimore, Maryland, U.S.	
105	Win	60–12–20 (13)	Joe Butler	TKO	5 (6)	Apr 7, 1904	Broadway A.C., Philadelphia, Pennsylvania, U.S.	
104	Draw	59–12–20 (13)	Black Bill	PTS	15	Mar 11, 1904	Germania Maennerchor Hall, Baltimore, Maryland, U.S.	
103	Win	59–12–19 (13)	Professor Mike Donovan	PTS	15	Feb 5, 1904	Shlegel's Hall, Baltimore, Maryland, U.S.	
102	Win	58–12–19 (13)	Edward Snowden	KO	4 (?)	Jan 11, 1904	Hudson A.C., Baltimore, Maryland, U.S.	
101	Win	57–12–19 (13)	Bill Larry	KO	5 (?)	Jan 1, 1904	Eureka A.C., Baltimore, Maryland, U.S.	
100	Win	56–12–19 (13)	Bob Long	KO	11 (20)	Dec 11, 1903	Eureka A.C., Baltimore, Maryland, U.S.	
99	Win	55–12–19 (13)	Cyclone Kelly	NWS	6	Oct 30, 1903	State A.C., Philadelphia, Pennsylvania, U.S.	
98	Draw	55–12–19 (12)	George Cole	NWS	6	Oct 27, 1903	Southern A.C., Philadelphia, Pennsylvania, U.S.	
97	Loss	55–12–19 (11)	John Willie	PTS	6	Oct 3, 1903	Chicago, Illinois, U.S.	
96	Loss	55–11–19 (11)	Black Bill	NWS	6	Sep 7, 1903	National A.C., Philadelphia, Pennsylvania, U.S.	
95	Draw	55–11–19 (10)	Barbados Joe Walcott	PTS	20	Jun 18, 1903	Balanee Box, Portland, Oregon, U.S.	For world welterweight title
94	Win	55–11–18 (10)	Tom Riley	KO	2 (?)	May 21, 1903	Seattle, Washington, U.S.	
93	Draw	54–11–18 (10)	Larry Temple	PTS	10	Feb 9, 1903	Health & Physical Culture A.C., Boston, Massachusetts, U.S.	
92	Loss	54–11–17 (10)	George Cole	NWS	6	Feb 6, 1903	Ariel A.C., Philadelphia, Pennsylvania, U.S.	
91	Draw	54–11–17 (9)	Charlie Haghey	PTS	12	Jan 19, 1903	Criterion A.C., Boston, Massachusetts, U.S.	
90	Loss	54–11–16 (9)	Al Weinig	NWS	6	Jan 16, 1903	Ariel A.C., Philadelphia, Pennsylvania, U.S.	
89	Draw	54–11–16 (8)	Charlie O'Rourke	PTS	6	Dec 22, 1902	Cambridge Athletic Club, Boston, Massachusetts, U.S.	
88	NC	54–11–15 (8)	Jack "Twin" Sullivan	NC	5 (6)	Nov 27, 1902	Lenox A.C., Boston, Massachusetts, U.S.	The referee chased the fighters from the ring in the fifth round, due to the disappointment of the crowd
87	Draw	54–11–15 (7)	Charlie Haghey	PTS	15	Oct 24, 1902	Germania Maennerchor Hall, Baltimore, Maryland, U.S.	
86	Loss	54–11–14 (7)	John Willie	PTS	6	Oct 3, 1902	Brand's Hall, Chicago, Illinois, U.S.	
85	Loss	54–10–14 (7)	Al Neill	PTS	20	Sep 26, 1902	Woodward's Pavilion, San Francisco, California, U.S.	
84	Loss	54–9–14 (7)	Morgan Williams	DQ	15 (15)	Sep 3, 1902	Acme A.C., Oakland, California, U.S.	In the 15th Jackson knocked Williams down but struck him with an unintentional blow on the jaw while he was still down
83	Win	54–8–14 (7)	Tim Draffin Murphy	TKO	5 (15)	Aug 28, 1902	Stockton, California, U.S.	
82	Win	53–8–14 (7)	Professor Mike Donovan	PTS	20	Jul 22, 1902	Hazard's Pavilion, Los Angeles, California, U.S.	
81	Win	52–8–14 (7)	Bob Long	TKO	16 (20)	Jun 18, 1902	Convention Hall, Kansas City, Missouri, U.S.	
80	Win	51–8–14 (7)	Harry Walsh	TKO	10 (?)	May 23, 1902	Ford Opera House, Baltimore, Maryland, U.S.	
79	Loss	50–8–14 (7)	Philadelphia Jack O'Brien	NWS	6	Apr 28, 1902	Washington S.C., Philadelphia, Pennsylvania, U.S.	
78	Win	50–8–14 (6)	Charlie McKeever	DQ	6 (6)	Apr 21, 1902	Washington S.C., Philadelphia, Pennsylvania, U.S.	
77	Win	49–8–14 (6)	Dan Creedon	TKO	5 (20)	Apr 18, 1902	Germania Maennerchor Hall, Baltimore, Maryland, U.S.	
76	Loss	48–8–14 (6)	Charlie Haghey	NWS	6	Apr 3, 1902	Broadway A.C., Philadelphia, Pennsylvania, U.S.	
75	Win	48–8–14 (5)	Scaldy Bill Quinn	NWS	6	Mar 29, 1902	Central A.C., Philadelphia, Pennsylvania, U.S.	
74	Draw	48–8–14 (4)	Barbados Joe Walcott	PTS	10	Mar 13, 1902	Germania Maennerchor Hall, Baltimore, Maryland, U.S.	
73	Win	48–8–13 (4)	Jack Butler	DQ	9 (?)	Mar 7, 1902	Germania Maennerchor Hall, Baltimore, Maryland, U.S.	
72	Win	47–8–13 (4)	Tommy West	TKO	2 (6)	Feb 24, 1902	Penn Art Club, Philadelphia, Pennsylvania, U.S.	
71	Win	46–8–13 (4)	Harry Fisher	TKO	9 (?)	Jan 31, 1902	Baltimore, Maryland, U.S.	
70	Win	45–8–13 (4)	Jack Bonner	NWS	6	Jan 27, 1902	Washington S.C., Philadelphia, Pennsylvania, U.S.	
69	Loss	45–8–13 (3)	Barbados Joe Walcott	NWS	6	Jan 13, 1902	Penn Art Club, Philadelphia, Pennsylvania, U.S.	
68	Win	45–8–13 (2)	Jim Austin	TKO	4 (20)	Jan 10, 1902	Germania Maennerchor Hall, Baltimore, Maryland, U.S.	
67	Win	44–8–13 (2)	Jimmy Handler	TKO	3 (20)	Jan 1, 1902	Jacque's Auditorium, Waterbury, Connecticut, U.S.	
66	Win	43–8–13 (2)	Charlie O'Rourke	TKO	4 (20)	Dec 20, 1901	Germania Maennerchor Hall, Baltimore, Maryland, U.S.	
65	Loss	42–8–13 (2)	Barbados Joe Walcott	PTS	20	Nov 28, 1901	Music Hall, Baltimore, New Jersey, U.S.	
64	Draw	42–7–13 (2)	Jimmy Handler	TD	18 (20)	Nov 11, 1901	Trenton A.C., Trenton, New Jersey, U.S.	Fight stopped by police because of excessive behaviour of the fans
63	Win	42–7–12 (2)	Harry Peppers	KO	4 (20)	Nov 1, 1901	Eureka A.C., Baltimore, Maryland, U.S.	
62	Win	41–7–12 (2)	Scaldy Bill Quinn	KO	8 (20)	Oct 11, 1901	Germania Maennerchor Hall, Baltimore, Maryland, U.S.	
61	Win	40–7–12 (2)	Scaldy Bill Quinn	TKO	3 (10)	Sep 27, 1901	Germania Maennerchor Hall, Baltimore, Maryland, U.S.	
60	Win	39–7–12 (2)	Jimmy Handler	TKO	9 (20)	Jul 29, 1901	Ford Opera House, Baltimore, Maryland, U.S.	
59	Win	38–7–12 (2)	Mysterious Billy Smith	TKO	2 (?)	Jun 14, 1901	Germania Maennerchor Hall, Baltimore, Maryland, U.S.	
58	Draw	37–7–12 (2)	Bobby Dobbs	TD	12 (20)	Apr 4, 1901	Hot Springs, Arkansas, U.S.	
57	Draw	37–7–11 (2)	Steve Crosby	PTS	10	Feb 26, 1901	Phoenix A.C., Memphis, Tennessee, U.S.	
56	Draw	37–7–10 (2)	Bobby Dobbs	PTS	20	Feb 18, 1901	Memphis, Tennessee, U.S.	
55	Win	37–7–9 (2)	Eddie Croake	KO	12 (?)	Feb 4, 1901	Gilbert, Illinois, U.S.	
54	Loss	36–7–9 (2)	Bobby Dobbs	PTS	25	Jan 22, 1901	Memphis, Tennessee, U.S.	
53	Draw	36–6–9 (2)	Perry Queenan	PTS	20	Nov 27, 1900	Omaha, Nebraska, U.S.	
52	Loss	36–6–8 (2)	Jimmy Handler	NWS	6	Oct 22, 1900	Penn Art Club, Philadelphia, Pennsylvania, U.S.	
51	Loss	36–6–8 (1)	Mysterious Billy Smith	TKO	18 (?)	Sep 11, 1900	Cleveland, Ohio, U.S.	Police intervened to save Jackson from further punishment
50	Loss	36–5–8 (1)	Tom McCune	PTS	6	Aug 10, 1900	Light Guard Armory, Detroit, Michigan, U.S.	
49	Win	36–4–8 (1)	Fred Thornton	PTS	6	Aug 10, 1900	Light Guard Armory, Detroit, Michigan, U.S.	
48	Loss	35–4–8 (1)	Otto Sieloff	PTS	10	Aug 3, 1900	Olympic A.C., Denver, Colorado, U.S.	
47	Win	35–3–8 (1)	Shorty Ahearn	PTS	10	Jul 20, 1900	Olympic A.C., Denver, Colorado, U.S.	
46	Win	34–3–8 (1)	Kid Parker	PTS	10	Jun 8, 1900	Colorado A.C., Denver, Colorado, U.S.	
45	Draw	33–3–8 (1)	Frank Purcell	PTS	20	Mar 28, 1900	Sacramento, California, U.S.	
44	Draw	33–3–7 (1)	Perry Queenan	PTS	20	Mar 25, 1900	Omaha, Nebraska, U.S.	
43	Win	33–3–6 (1)	Philadelphia Jack O'Brien	KO	13 (20)	Feb 14, 1900	Woodward's Pavilion, San Francisco, California, U.S.	
42	Win	32–3–6 (1)	Tom Tracey	DQ	7 (?)	Jan 17, 1900	Stockton, California, U.S.	Tracey picked Jackson up and deliberately threw him through the ropes
41	Win	31–3–6 (1)	Harris Martin	KO	2 (?)	Dec 20, 1899	Germania Hall, Seattle, Washington, U.S.	
40	Win	30–3–6 (1)	Billy Wright	PTS	10	Dec 11, 1899	Whatcom, Washington, U.S.	
39	Win	29–3–6 (1)	Arthur Walker	KO	3 (?)	Dec 4, 1899	Seattle, Washington, U.S.	
38	Win	28–3–6 (1)	W H Jones	KO	5 (?)	Nov 10, 1899	Seattle, Washington, U.S.	
37	Win	27–3–6 (1)	Jim Tremble	KO	20 (?)	Oct 27, 1899	Athletic Club, Los Angeles, California, U.S.	
36	Win	26–3–6 (1)	Harry Barrett	KO	2 (?)	Oct 4, 1899	London, England, U.K.	
35	Win	25–3–6 (1)	Jim Tremble	PTS	20	Sep 7, 1899	Athletic Club, Los Angeles, California, U.S.	
34	Win	24–3–6 (1)	Charley Turner	TKO	2 (?)	Aug 7, 1899	San Joaquin A.C., Stockton, California, U.S.	
33	Win	23–3–6 (1)	Australian Jim Ryan	PTS	20	Jul 29, 1899	Bakersfield, California, U.S.	
32	Win	22–3–6 (1)	Joe Lavigne	PTS	25	May 26, 1899	Stockton, California, U.S.	
31	Win	21–3–6 (1)	John Fletcher	KO	3 (?)	Jan 24, 1899	Salinas, California, U.S.	
30	Draw	20–3–6 (1)	Charley Turner	PTS	10	Jan 6, 1899	East San Jose Hall, San Jose, California, U.S.	
29	Win	20–3–5 (1)	Jack Ortega	DQ	27	Dec 23, 1898	Franklin Hall, San Jose, California, U.S.	A finish fight
28	Loss	19–3–5 (1)	Phil Green	DQ	5 (10)	Sep 30, 1898	Woodward's Pavilion, San Francisco, California, U.S.	
27	Win	19–2–5 (1)	Mike McCormick	KO	8 (10)	Sep 20, 1898	Woodward's Pavilion, San Francisco, California, U.S.	
26	Win	18–2–5 (1)	Henry Stater	KO	2 (?)	Aug 23, 1898	Woodward's Pavilion, San Francisco, California, U.S.	
25	Draw	17–2–5 (1)	Frank Purcell	PTS	10	Jun 21, 1898	San Francisco, California, U.S.	
24	Win	17–2–4 (1)	Arthur Jackson	KO	4 (?)	May 19, 1898	Alpine Club, San Francisco, California, U.S.	
23	Win	16–2–4 (1)	Henry Lewis	KO	4 (?)	May 13, 1898	Excelsior A.C., San Francisco, California, U.S.	
22	Win	15–2–4 (1)	Kid O'Brien	KO	5 (?)	Apr 23, 1898	Sacramento, California, U.S.	
21	Loss	14–2–4 (1)	Young Griffo	DQ	4 (12)	Mar 26, 1898	Chico, Colorado, U.S.	
20	Draw	14–1–4 (1)	Frank Purcell	PTS	10	Feb 26, 1898	Chico, Colorado, U.S.	
19	Win	14–1–3 (1)	Jim Pendergast	PTS	6	Feb 6, 1898	Chica, Colorado, U.S.	
18	Win	13–1–3 (1)	Charley Edwards	KO	2 (?)	Sep 12, 1897	Cripple Creek, Colorado, U.S.	
17	Win	12–1–3 (1)	Mexican Pete Everett	PTS	4	Aug 4, 1897	Pine Creek, Colorado, U.S.	
16	Win	11–1–3 (1)	Frank Cartwright	KO	3 (?)	Jul 22, 1897	Pine Creek, Colorado, U.S.	
15	Win	10–1–3 (1)	Charles Reinecke	KO	6 (?)	Jun 28, 1897	Pine Creek, Colorado, U.S.	
14	Win	9–1–3 (1)	Henry Mings	KO	6 (?)	Jun 16, 1897	Nevada City, California, U.S.	
13	Loss	8–1–3 (1)	Kid Parker	TKO	7 (?)	Mar 26, 1897	Denver, Colorado, U.S.	
12	Draw	8–0–3 (1)	Joe Kid Robinson	PTS	10	Mar 19, 1897	Royal Athletic Club, Denver, Colorado, U.S.	
11	Win	8–0–2 (1)	Joe Fischer	KO	3 (?)	Jan 26, 1897	Royal Athletic Club, Denver, Colorado, U.S.	
10	Draw	7–0–2 (1)	Kid Parker	PTS	20	Jan 2, 1897	Royal Athletic Club, Denver, Colorado, U.S.	
9	Win	7–0–1 (1)	Jack King	TKO	7 (10)	Dec 9, 1896	Masonic temple, Denver, Colorado, U.S.	
8	Draw	6–0–1 (1)	Kid Dooley	PTS	4	Dec 5, 1896	Elyria A.C., Denver, Colorado, U.S.	
7	Win	6–0 (1)	Oscar Gardner	NWS	4	Oct 1, 1896	Lyceum Theater, Denver, Colorado, U.S.	
6	Win	6–0	Young Payton	KO	3 (?)	Mar 4, 1896	Denver, Colorado, U.S.	
5	Win	5–0	Eugene Turner	KO	8 (?)	Nov 5, 1895	Denver, Colorado, U.S.	
4	Win	4–0	Eugene Turner	KO	3 (?)	Sep 12, 1895	Denver, Colorado, U.S.	
3	Win	3–0	Bert Dover	PTS	4	Aug 2, 1895	Colorado City, Colorado, U.S.	
2	Win	2–0	Professor Snowball	KO	10 (?)	Jul 3, 1895	Colorado City, Colorado, U.S.	
1	Win	1–0	Tom Hayes	KO	1 (?)	Jul 3, 1895	Colorado City, Colorado, U.S.	Professional Debut

=== Unofficial record ===
153 fights	83 wins	36 losses
By knockout	59	4
By decision	19	27
By disqualification	5	5
Draws	30	
No contests	4	

Record with the inclusion of newspaper decisions in the win/loss/draw column.

No.	Result	Record	Opponent	Type	Round	Date	Location	Notes
153	Loss	83–36–30 (4)	Jim Downing	PTS	10	Dec 10, 1914	Forest Park Arena, Boise, Idaho, U.S.	
152	Win	83–35–30 (4)	Henry Petty	KO	3 (?)	Jun 12, 1914	Airdome, Price, Utah, U.S.	
151	Loss	82–35–30 (4)	Jack Downey	DQ	9 (20)	Apr 15, 1914	Price, Utah, U.S.	Apr 27?
150	Draw	82–34–30 (4)	Jack Duarte	PTS	20	Apr 13, 1914	Eureka, Utah, U.S.	
149	Draw	82–34–29 (4)	Jack Downey	PTS	6	Mar 31, 1914	Bingham, Utah, U.S.	
148	Win	82–34–28 (4)	Mike Queenan	KO	1 (10)	Mar 16, 1914	Tooele, Utah, U.S.	
147	Draw	81–34–28 (4)	Ike Cohen	PTS	10	Oct 30, 1913	Boise, Idaho, U.S.	
146	Win	81–34–27 (4)	Jack Downey	KO	8 (?)	Sep 1, 1913	Park City, Utah, U.S.	
145	ND	80–34–27 (4)	Dave Mills	ND	6	Aug 2, 1913	United States of America	Date not certain
144	Win	80–34–27 (3)	Joe Clark	PTS	10	Feb 8, 1913	Opera House, Eureka, Utah, U.S.	
143	Loss	79–34–27 (3)	Bert Whirlwind	KO	2 (6)	Jan 12, 1912	American A.C., Philadelphia, Pennsylvania, U.S.	
142	Loss	79–33–27 (3)	Jack Fink	NWS	6	Jan 11, 1912	Broadway A.C., Philadelphia, Pennsylvania, U.S.	
141	Loss	79–32–27 (3)	Billy Ryan	TKO	4 (6)	Dec 26, 1911	Douglas A.C., Philadelphia, Pennsylvania, U.S.	
140	Win	79–31–27 (3)	Barney Malone	TKO	3 (6)	Oct 18, 1911	American A.C., Philadelphia, Pennsylvania, U.S.	
139	Draw	78–31–27 (3)	Harry Cyrus	NWS	6	Sep 25, 1911	American A.C., Philadelphia, Pennsylvania, U.S.	
138	Draw	78–31–26 (3)	Morgan Williams	PTS	10	Jul 3, 1911	Trocadero Hall, Murray, Utah, U.S.	
137	Draw	78–31–25 (3)	Jack Rogers	PTS	10	May 9, 1911	Trocadero Hall, Murray, Utah, U.S.	
136	Loss	78–31–24 (3)	John Willie	PTS	15	Apr 25, 1911	Auditorium Rink, Saskatoon, Saskatchewan, Canada	
135	Loss	78–30–24 (3)	Tim O'Neil	DQ	2 (10)	Nov 26, 1909	West Oakland Club, Oakland, California, U.S.	Jackson grabbed him by the leg and dragged his opponent to the floor after suffering a knockdown, whereupon the referee DQ'd him
134	Loss	78–29–24 (3)	Gunboat Smith	PTS	10	Nov 10, 1909	Piedmont Pavilion, Oakland, California, U.S.	
133	Win	78–28–24 (3)	Al Neill	PTS	10	Sep 29, 1909	West Oakland Club, Oakland, California, U.S.	
132	Win	77–28–24 (3)	Jack Burke	KO	2 (20)	Sep 6, 1909	Coliseum Pavilion, San Francisco, California, U.S.	
131	NC	76–28–24 (3)	Al Neill	NC	7 (20)	Sep 7, 1908	New Goldfield A.C., Goldfield, Nevada, U.S.	Police stopped it, believing it to be a fake bout and the fans lost their admission when the promoter skipped out with the gate receipts
130	NC	76–28–24 (2)	Dick Sullivan	NC	17 (20)	Jan 28, 1908	Marysville A.C., Marysville, California, U.S.	Apparently, after taking a beating from Jackson, Sullivan huddled with him and made a deal to go the distance
129	Win	76–28–24 (1)	Tom Reilly	KO	7 (?)	Nov 28, 1907	Sacramento, California, U.S.	
128	Loss	75–28–24 (1)	Sam Langford	PTS	20	Nov 12, 1907	Pacific A.C., Los Angeles, California, U.S.	For vacant world colored middleweight title
127	Win	75–27–24 (1)	Terry Mustain	KO	17	Sep 2, 1907	Goldfield, Nevada, U.S.	A finish fight
126	Win	74–27–24 (1)	Ed Butte	DQ	4 (?)	May 15, 1907	Portsmouth, Virginia, U.S.	
125	Loss	73–27–24 (1)	Joe Jennette	NWS	6	Mar 8, 1907	Spring Garden A.C., Philadelphia, Pennsylvania, U.S.	
124	Draw	73–26–24 (1)	Black Bill	PTS	8	Feb 9, 1907	Baltimore A.C., Baltimore, Maryland, U.S.	
123	Loss	73–26–23 (1)	Sam Langford	PTS	15	Nov 21, 1906	Rochester, New York, U.S.	
122	Loss	73–25–23 (1)	Professor Mike Donovan	DQ	9 (?)	Oct 26, 1906	Rochester, New York, U.S.	
121	Win	73–24–23 (1)	Sam Langford	TKO	5 (?)	Jun 13, 1906	Southbridge, Massachusetts, U.S.	
120	Loss	72–24–23 (1)	Jack Johnson	NWS	12	Dec 1, 1905	Germania Maennerchor Hall, Baltimore, Maryland, U.S.	World colored heavyweight title at stake; (via KO only)
119	Draw	72–23–23 (1)	Sam Langford	PTS	15	Sep 29, 1905	Germania Maennerchor Hall, Baltimore, Maryland, U.S.	
118	Loss	72–23–22 (1)	Sam Langford	PTS	15	Jun 16, 1905	Douglas A.C., Chelsea, Massachusetts, U.S.	
117	Loss	72–22–22 (1)	Sam Langford	PTS	15	May 26, 1905	Highland A.C., Marlborough, Massachusetts, U.S.	
116	Win	72–21–22 (1)	Larry Temple	NWS	12	May 15, 1905	Nonpareil A.C., Sharon, Pennsylvania, U.S.	
115	Loss	71–21–22 (1)	Philadelphia Jack O'Brien	PTS	10	Apr 7, 1905	4th Regiment Armory, Baltimore, Maryland, U.S.	For world middleweight title claim
114	Loss	71–20–22 (1)	Philadelphia Jack O'Brien	DQ	2 (15)	Mar 24, 1905	4th Regiment Armory, Baltimore, Maryland, U.S.	For world and American middleweight title claims; Jackson accidentally knocked out referee O'Hara as he was breaking a clinch between the fighters
113	Draw	71–19–22 (1)	Dixie Kid	PTS	15	Dec 26, 1904	Germania Maennerchor Hall, Baltimore, Maryland, U.S.	
112	Win	71–19–21 (1)	Charlie Allum	KO	6 (15)	Nov 21, 1904	Wonderland, Whitechapel Road, Mile End, London, England, U.K.	
111	Win	70–19–21 (1)	Jack Scales	TKO	4 (?)	Oct 24, 1904	Ginnetts Circus, Newcastle, Tyne and Wear, England, U.K.	
110	Win	69–19–21 (1)	Harry Barrett	TKO	2 (6)	Oct 3, 1904	National Sporting Club, Covent Garden, London, England, U.K.	
109	Win	68–19–21 (1)	Charlie Knock	KO	3 (15)	Sep 26, 1904	Wonderland, Whitechapel Road, Mile End, London, England, U.K.	Billed for world 148lbs title
108	Win	67–19–21 (1)	Harry Slounch Dixon	KO	2 (6)	Aug 27, 1904	Wonderland, Whitechapel Road, Mile End, London, England, U.K.	
107	Win	66–19–21 (1)	Private Casling	TKO	2 (6)	Aug 6, 1904	Wonderland, Whitechapel Road, Mile End, London, England, U.K.	
106	Win	65–19–21 (1)	Barbados Joe Walcott	KO	4 (10)	Jun 10, 1904	Germania Maennerchor Hall, Baltimore, Maryland, U.S.	
105	Win	64–19–21 (1)	Joe Butler	TKO	5 (6)	Apr 7, 1904	Broadway A.C., Philadelphia, Pennsylvania, U.S.	
104	Draw	63–19–21 (1)	Black Bill	PTS	15	Mar 11, 1904	Germania Maennerchor Hall, Baltimore, Maryland, U.S.	
103	Win	63–19–20 (1)	Professor Mike Donovan	PTS	15	Feb 5, 1904	Shlegel's Hall, Baltimore, Maryland, U.S.	
102	Win	62–19–20 (1)	Edward Snowden	KO	4 (?)	Jan 11, 1904	Hudson A.C., Baltimore, Maryland, U.S.	
101	Win	61–19–20 (1)	Bill Larry	KO	5 (?)	Jan 1, 1904	Eureka A.C., Baltimore, Maryland, U.S.	
100	Win	60–19–20 (1)	Bob Long	KO	11 (20)	Dec 11, 1903	Eureka A.C., Baltimore, Maryland, U.S.	
99	Win	59–19–20 (1)	Cyclone Kelly	NWS	6	Oct 30, 1903	State A.C., Philadelphia, Pennsylvania, U.S.	
98	Draw	58–19–20 (1)	George Cole	NWS	6	Oct 27, 1903	Southern A.C., Philadelphia, Pennsylvania, U.S.	
97	Loss	58–19–19 (1)	John Willie	PTS	6	Oct 3, 1903	Chicago, Illinois, U.S.	
96	Loss	58–18–19 (1)	Black Bill	NWS	6	Sep 7, 1903	National A.C., Philadelphia, Pennsylvania, U.S.	
95	Draw	58–17–19 (1)	Barbados Joe Walcott	PTS	20	Jun 18, 1903	Balanee Box, Portland, Oregon, U.S.	For world welterweight title
94	Win	58–17–18 (1)	Tom Riley	KO	2 (?)	May 21, 1903	Seattle, Washington, U.S.	
93	Draw	57–17–18 (1)	Larry Temple	PTS	10	Feb 9, 1903	Health & Physical Culture A.C., Boston, Massachusetts, U.S.	
92	Loss	57–17–17 (1)	George Cole	NWS	6	Feb 6, 1903	Ariel A.C., Philadelphia, Pennsylvania, U.S.	
91	Draw	57–16–17 (1)	Charlie Haghey	PTS	12	Jan 19, 1903	Criterion A.C., Boston, Massachusetts, U.S.	
90	Loss	57–16–16 (1)	Al Weinig	NWS	6	Jan 16, 1903	Ariel A.C., Philadelphia, Pennsylvania, U.S.	
89	Draw	57–15–16 (1)	Charlie O'Rourke	PTS	6	Dec 22, 1902	Cambridge Athletic Club, Boston, Massachusetts, U.S.	
88	NC	57–15–15 (1)	Jack "Twin" Sullivan	NC	5 (6)	Nov 27, 1902	Lenox A.C., Boston, Massachusetts, U.S.	The referee chased the fighters from the ring in the fifth round, due to the disappointment of the crowd
87	Draw	57–15–15	Charlie Haghey	PTS	15	Oct 24, 1902	Germania Maennerchor Hall, Baltimore, Maryland, U.S.	
86	Loss	57–15–14	John Willie	PTS	6	Oct 3, 1902	Brand's Hall, Chicago, Illinois, U.S.	
85	Loss	57–14–14	Al Neill	PTS	20	Sep 26, 1902	Woodward's Pavilion, San Francisco, California, U.S.	
84	Loss	57–13–14	Morgan Williams	DQ	15 (15)	Sep 3, 1902	Acme A.C., Oakland, California, U.S.	In the 15th Jackson knocked Williams down but struck him with an unintentional blow on the jaw while he was still down
83	Win	57–12–14	Tim Draffin Murphy	TKO	5 (15)	Aug 28, 1902	Stockton, California, U.S.	
82	Win	56–12–14	Professor Mike Donovan	PTS	20	Jul 22, 1902	Hazard's Pavilion, Los Angeles, California, U.S.	
81	Win	55–12–14	Bob Long	TKO	16 (20)	Jun 18, 1902	Convention Hall, Kansas City, Missouri, U.S.	
80	Win	54–12–14	Harry Walsh	TKO	10 (?)	May 23, 1902	Ford Opera House, Baltimore, Maryland, U.S.	
79	Loss	53–12–14	Philadelphia Jack O'Brien	NWS	6	Apr 28, 1902	Washington S.C., Philadelphia, Pennsylvania, U.S.	
78	Win	53–11–14	Charlie McKeever	DQ	6 (6)	Apr 21, 1902	Washington S.C., Philadelphia, Pennsylvania, U.S.	
77	Win	52–11–14	Dan Creedon	TKO	5 (20)	Apr 18, 1902	Germania Maennerchor Hall, Baltimore, Maryland, U.S.	
76	Loss	51–11–14	Charlie Haghey	NWS	6	Apr 3, 1902	Broadway A.C., Philadelphia, Pennsylvania, U.S.	
75	Win	51–10–14	Scaldy Bill Quinn	NWS	6	Mar 29, 1902	Central A.C., Philadelphia, Pennsylvania, U.S.	
74	Draw	50–10–14	Barbados Joe Walcott	PTS	10	Mar 13, 1902	Germania Maennerchor Hall, Baltimore, Maryland, U.S.	
73	Win	50–10–13	Jack Butler	DQ	9 (?)	Mar 7, 1902	Germania Maennerchor Hall, Baltimore, Maryland, U.S.	
72	Win	49–10–13	Tommy West	TKO	2 (6)	Feb 24, 1902	Penn Art Club, Philadelphia, Pennsylvania, U.S.	
71	Win	48–10–13	Harry Fisher	TKO	9 (?)	Jan 31, 1902	Baltimore, Maryland, U.S.	
70	Win	47–10–13	Jack Bonner	NWS	6	Jan 27, 1902	Washington S.C., Philadelphia, Pennsylvania, U.S.	
69	Loss	46–10–13	Barbados Joe Walcott	NWS	6	Jan 13, 1902	Penn Art Club, Philadelphia, Pennsylvania, U.S.	
68	Win	46–9–13	Jim Austin	TKO	4 (20)	Jan 10, 1902	Germania Maennerchor Hall, Baltimore, Maryland, U.S.	
67	Win	45–9–13	Jimmy Handler	TKO	3 (20)	Jan 1, 1902	Jacque's Auditorium, Waterbury, Connecticut, U.S.	
66	Win	44–9–13	Charlie O'Rourke	TKO	4 (20)	Dec 20, 1901	Germania Maennerchor Hall, Baltimore, Maryland, U.S.	
65	Loss	43–9–13	Barbados Joe Walcott	PTS	20	Nov 28, 1901	Music Hall, Baltimore, New Jersey, U.S.	
64	Draw	43–8–13	Jimmy Handler	TD	18 (20)	Nov 11, 1901	Trenton A.C., Trenton, New Jersey, U.S.	Fight stopped by police because of excessive behaviour of the fans
63	Win	43–8–12	Harry Peppers	KO	4 (20)	Nov 1, 1901	Eureka A.C., Baltimore, Maryland, U.S.	
62	Win	42–8–12	Scaldy Bill Quinn	KO	8 (20)	Oct 11, 1901	Germania Maennerchor Hall, Baltimore, Maryland, U.S.	
61	Win	41–8–12	Scaldy Bill Quinn	TKO	3 (10)	Sep 27, 1901	Germania Maennerchor Hall, Baltimore, Maryland, U.S.	
60	Win	40–8–12	Jimmy Handler	TKO	9 (20)	Jul 29, 1901	Ford Opera House, Baltimore, Maryland, U.S.	
59	Win	39–8–12	Mysterious Billy Smith	TKO	2 (?)	Jun 14, 1901	Germania Maennerchor Hall, Baltimore, Maryland, U.S.	
58	Draw	38–8–12	Bobby Dobbs	TD	12 (20)	Apr 4, 1901	Hot Springs, Arkansas, U.S.	
57	Draw	38–8–11	Steve Crosby	PTS	10	Feb 26, 1901	Phoenix A.C., Memphis, Tennessee, U.S.	
56	Draw	38–8–10	Bobby Dobbs	PTS	20	Feb 18, 1901	Memphis, Tennessee, U.S.	
55	Win	38–8–9	Eddie Croake	KO	12 (?)	Feb 4, 1901	Gilbert, Illinois, U.S.	
54	Loss	37–8–9	Bobby Dobbs	PTS	25	Jan 22, 1901	Memphis, Tennessee, U.S.	
53	Draw	37–7–9	Perry Queenan	PTS	20	Nov 27, 1900	Omaha, Nebraska, U.S.	
52	Loss	37–7–8	Jimmy Handler	NWS	6	Oct 22, 1900	Penn Art Club, Philadelphia, Pennsylvania, U.S.	
51	Loss	37–6–8	Mysterious Billy Smith	TKO	18 (?)	Sep 11, 1900	Cleveland, Ohio, U.S.	Police intervened to save Jackson from further punishment
50	Loss	37–5–8	Tom McCune	PTS	6	Aug 10, 1900	Light Guard Armory, Detroit, Michigan, U.S.	
49	Win	37–4–8	Fred Thornton	PTS	6	Aug 10, 1900	Light Guard Armory, Detroit, Michigan, U.S.	
48	Loss	36–4–8	Otto Sieloff	PTS	10	Aug 3, 1900	Olympic A.C., Denver, Colorado, U.S.	
47	Win	36–3–8	Shorty Ahearn	PTS	10	Jul 20, 1900	Olympic A.C., Denver, Colorado, U.S.	
46	Win	35–3–8	Kid Parker	PTS	10	Jun 8, 1900	Colorado A.C., Denver, Colorado, U.S.	
45	Draw	34–3–8	Frank Purcell	PTS	20	Mar 28, 1900	Sacramento, California, U.S.	
44	Draw	34–3–7	Perry Queenan	PTS	20	Mar 25, 1900	Omaha, Nebraska, U.S.	
43	Win	34–3–6	Philadelphia Jack O'Brien	KO	13 (20)	Feb 14, 1900	Woodward's Pavilion, San Francisco, California, U.S.	
42	Win	33–3–6	Tom Tracey	DQ	7 (?)	Jan 17, 1900	Stockton, California, U.S.	Tracey picked Jackson up and deliberately threw him through the ropes
41	Win	32–3–6	Harris Martin	KO	2 (?)	Dec 20, 1899	Germania Hall, Seattle, Washington, U.S.	
40	Win	31–3–6	Billy Wright	PTS	10	Dec 11, 1899	Whatcom, Washington, U.S.	
39	Win	30–3–6	Arthur Walker	KO	3 (?)	Dec 4, 1899	Seattle, Washington, U.S.	
38	Win	29–3–6	W H Jones	KO	5 (?)	Nov 10, 1899	Seattle, Washington, U.S.	
37	Win	28–3–6	Jim Tremble	KO	20 (?)	Oct 27, 1899	Athletic Club, Los Angeles, California, U.S.	
36	Win	27–3–6	Harry Barrett	KO	2 (?)	Oct 4, 1899	London, England, U.K.	
35	Win	26–3–6	Jim Tremble	PTS	20	Sep 7, 1899	Athletic Club, Los Angeles, California, U.S.	
34	Win	25–3–6	Charley Turner	TKO	2 (?)	Aug 7, 1899	San Joaquin A.C., Stockton, California, U.S.	
33	Win	24–3–6	Australian Jim Ryan	PTS	20	Jul 29, 1899	Bakersfield, California, U.S.	
32	Win	23–3–6	Joe Lavigne	PTS	25	May 26, 1899	Stockton, California, U.S.	
31	Win	22–3–6	John Fletcher	KO	3 (?)	Jan 24, 1899	Salinas, California, U.S.	
30	Draw	21–3–6	Charley Turner	PTS	10	Jan 6, 1899	East San Jose Hall, San Jose, California, U.S.	
29	Win	21–3–5	Jack Ortega	DQ	27	Dec 23, 1898	Franklin Hall, San Jose, California, U.S.	A finish fight
28	Loss	20–3–5	Phil Green	DQ	5 (10)	Sep 30, 1898	Woodward's Pavilion, San Francisco, California, U.S.	
27	Win	20–2–5	Mike McCormick	KO	8 (10)	Sep 20, 1898	Woodward's Pavilion, San Francisco, California, U.S.	
26	Win	19–2–5	Henry Stater	KO	2 (?)	Aug 23, 1898	Woodward's Pavilion, San Francisco, California, U.S.	
25	Draw	18–2–5	Frank Purcell	PTS	10	Jun 21, 1898	San Francisco, California, U.S.	
24	Win	18–2–4	Arthur Jackson	KO	4 (?)	May 19, 1898	Alpine Club, San Francisco, California, U.S.	
23	Win	17–2–4	Henry Lewis	KO	4 (?)	May 13, 1898	Excelsior A.C., San Francisco, California, U.S.	
22	Win	16–2–4	Kid O'Brien	KO	5 (?)	Apr 23, 1898	Sacramento, California, U.S.	
21	Loss	15–2–4	Young Griffo	DQ	4 (12)	Mar 26, 1898	Chico, Colorado, U.S.	
20	Draw	15–1–4	Frank Purcell	PTS	10	Feb 26, 1898	Chico, Colorado, U.S.	
19	Win	15–1–3	Jim Pendergast	PTS	6	Feb 6, 1898	Chica, Colorado, U.S.	
18	Win	14–1–3	Charley Edwards	KO	2 (?)	Sep 12, 1897	Cripple Creek, Colorado, U.S.	
17	Win	13–1–3	Mexican Pete Everett	PTS	4	Aug 4, 1897	Pine Creek, Colorado, U.S.	
16	Win	12–1–3	Frank Cartwright	KO	3 (?)	Jul 22, 1897	Pine Creek, Colorado, U.S.	
15	Win	11–1–3	Charles Reinecke	KO	6 (?)	Jun 28, 1897	Pine Creek, Colorado, U.S.	
14	Win	10–1–3	Henry Mings	KO	6 (?)	Jun 16, 1897	Nevada City, California, U.S.	
13	Loss	9–1–3	Kid Parker	TKO	7 (?)	Mar 26, 1897	Denver, Colorado, U.S.	
12	Draw	9–0–3	Joe Kid Robinson	PTS	10	Mar 19, 1897	Royal Athletic Club, Denver, Colorado, U.S.	
11	Win	9–0–2	Joe Fischer	KO	3 (?)	Jan 26, 1897	Royal Athletic Club, Denver, Colorado, U.S.	
10	Draw	8–0–2	Kid Parker	PTS	20	Jan 2, 1897	Royal Athletic Club, Denver, Colorado, U.S.	
9	Win	8–0–1	Jack King	TKO	7 (10)	Dec 9, 1896	Masonic temple, Denver, Colorado, U.S.	
8	Draw	7–0–1	Kid Dooley	PTS	4	Dec 5, 1896	Elyria A.C., Denver, Colorado, U.S.	
7	Win	7–0	Oscar Gardner	NWS	4	Oct 1, 1896	Lyceum Theater, Denver, Colorado, U.S.	
6	Win	6–0	Young Payton	KO	3 (?)	Mar 4, 1896	Denver, Colorado, U.S.	
5	Win	5–0	Eugene Turner	KO	8 (?)	Nov 5, 1895	Denver, Colorado, U.S.	
4	Win	4–0	Eugene Turner	KO	3 (?)	Sep 12, 1895	Denver, Colorado, U.S.	
3	Win	3–0	Bert Dover	PTS	4	Aug 2, 1895	Colorado City, Colorado, U.S.	
2	Win	2–0	Professor Snowball	KO	10 (?)	Jul 3, 1895	Colorado City, Colorado, U.S.	
1	Win	1–0	Tom Hayes	KO	1 (?)	Jul 3, 1895	Colorado City, Colorado, U.S.	Professional Debut
