= Creedon =

Creedon is a surname. Notable people with the surname include:

- Cónal Creedon, Irish writer
- Dan Creedon (1868–1942), New Zealand middleweight boxer
- Dave Creedon (1919–2007), Irish hurler and footballer
- Eileen Creedon (born 1957), Irish judge
- Geraldine Creedon (born 1945), American politician from Massachusetts
- John Creedon (born 1958), Irish broadcaster
- John J. Creedon (1924–2020), American business executive
- Johnny Creedon (1932–2019), Irish footballer
- Michael Creedon (Gaelic footballer) (born 1960), Irish footballer
- Michael C. Creedon (born 1946), American politician from Massachusetts
- Peter Creedon, Irish football manager
- Robert S. Creedon Jr. (born 1942), American politician from Massachusetts
- Tom Creedon (1954–1983), Irish footballer
