= Joe Walcott =

Joe Walcott is the name of two championship boxers:

- Barbados Joe Walcott (1873–1935), boxer from British Guiana
- Jersey Joe Walcott (1914–1994), boxer from New Jersey, United States
