= World Negro Middleweight Championship =

Segregated boxing title

The Negro Middleweight Championship of the World was a title in pretense claimed by Johnny Banks, an African-American boxer (born December 25, 1861, in Richmond, Virginia) who fought under the sobriquet "The Darkey Wizard" during the mid-1880s. He claimed the Negro Middleweight Championship but lost it in a title fight on January 26, 1887, in New York City to James Desverney when he was disqualified in the ninth round on a foul. (Desverney apparently never defended the title.)

Banks's next fight was with future colored middleweight champ Ed Binney in Boston, in which they drew in the scheduled 13 rounds after going easy on each other, to the disgust of the crowd and the bout promoters. Faced with losing their purses, the fighters fought another three rounds and Binney won the fight.

The title was doomed when Desverney failed to defend it and Harris Martin, "The Black Pearl", declared himself the world colored middleweight champion after beating "Black Frank" Taylor in Minneapolis on May 2, 1887. Harris lost his title to Ed Binney on November 30, 1891, in San Francisco.

The Black Pearl fought and was defeated by Charley Turner, "The Stockton Cyclone", in his next fight on February 29, 1892. Turner claimed the colored middleweight title but The Black Pearl already had lost it to Binney. Binney was considered the lineal colored middleweight champ, and he also had defeated the former holder of the Negro middleweight title, which went into abeyance.

== List of champions ==
Two men were recognized as World Negro Heavyweight Champion, a title that went into abeyance as the World Colored Middleweight Championship became the recognized title for African American boxers in that weight class.

#	Name	Reign	Date	Days held	Location	Defenses	Notes
1	Johnny Banks	1			—	1	Banks claimed the title.
2	James Desverney	26	1877	Unknown	New York City, New York, USA	0	Banks disqualified in the ninth round. Title became extinct after Desverney fails to defend it and World Colored Middleweight Championship becomes established.

== See also ==
- World Colored Middleweight Championship
