= Michael Creedon =

Michael Creedon may refer to:

- Michael Creedon (Gaelic footballer) (born 1960), Irish Gaelic footballer
- Michael C. Creedon, American judge and politician
