= Frank Craig =

American boxer

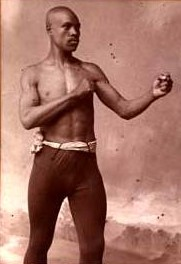

Personal information
- Born: April 1, 1868 Columbus, Georgia, US
- Died: January 1, 1943 (aged 74) Chelsea, London, England
- Height: 5 ft 10 in (178 cm)
- Weight: Middleweight

Boxing career
- Stance: Orthodox

Boxing record
- Total fights: 114
- Wins: 68
- Win by KO: 42
- Losses: 36
- Draws: 9

Frank Craig (April 1, 1868 – January 1, 1943) was an American boxer who was the colored middleweight champion of the world in the Gay Nineties. The 5′10" Craig fought at a weight of between 153 and 169 lbs. as a middleweight and light-heavyweight during his career. Known as "The Harlem Coffee Cooler", Craig was regarded as a smart and quick fighter. He later worked in Britain as a stage entertainer.

== Early life ==
Craig was born in Columbus, Georgia on April Fool's Day 1868 (some sources claim he was born on April 1, 1870 in New York City while other sources put his birthplace as Columbus, Ohio). From the age of 13 he gave exhibitions of boxing at fairs and in halls, before turning professional.

He gained the nickname "The Coffee Cooler" following an incident in a restaurant when a local fighter, Bully Singleton, who had ordered a cup of coffee, began hectoring Craig and invited him to fight in the adjoining alleyway. Craig called his bluff, went into the alley, and Singleton told the restaurant patrons that the coffee would still be hot when he returned. However, Craig quickly knocked Singleton out, Craig commenting that "the coffee will be cool enough when he gets round to drinking it".

== Colored Championship ==
Craig fought colored middleweight champ Joe Butler on March 18, 1893 in Philadelphia and was defeated in the second round. The two met again in a title match in Philadelphia on February 20, 1894 in Philadelphia, and this time, Craig emerged the victor, winning in the fourth round.

Craig never defended the title, which went vacant. He moved to London, England later that year, and began campaigning in Great Britain in October. He competed for the middleweight championship of England, losing to Dan Creedon on October 14, 1895 but winning the title by defeating George Chrisp November 24, 1898 via a knock out in the 13th round.

== Theatrical career ==
In The Sketch, June 26, 1901

In England, he made his debut as a singer and dancer in 1896. After a brief return to New York in 1899, he settled in London in 1900, occasionally returning to the ring. He formed his own variety company of black performers, including the female impersonators Cropp and Johnson. In 1900 he put on a boxing exhibition in Sunderland, defeating a popular local strong man; the audience started to riot in protest, and beat up a black acrobat who had been performing in Craig's troupe, mistaking him for the boxer. Craig toured Britain between 1900 and 1910, and also performed at the Folies Bergère in Paris.

== Later life and death ==
Craig made his last attempt at a boxing comeback in 1922, at the age of 54. By 1937, it was reported that he was reduced to performing in boxing booths at local fairs, and had appeared in court charged with striking a woman over the head with a bottle. In 1939, he was recorded as a resident at the Fulham Road Institution, a hospital and former workhouse.

He died in Chelsea, London, in January 1943 at the age of 74.

Awards and achievements
Preceded by Ed Binney	World Colored Middleweight Championship; November 13, 1892 - Unknown (Vacated title)	Succeeded by George Byers
