= Young Peter Jackson =

Young Peter Jackson may refer to:

- Young Peter Jackson (boxer, born 1877) (1877–1923), African American welterweight boxer known as "The Baltimore Demon"
- Young Peter Jackson (boxer, born 1912) (1912–1979), African American lightweight boxer
