= Barbados Joe Walcott =

Bajan boxer

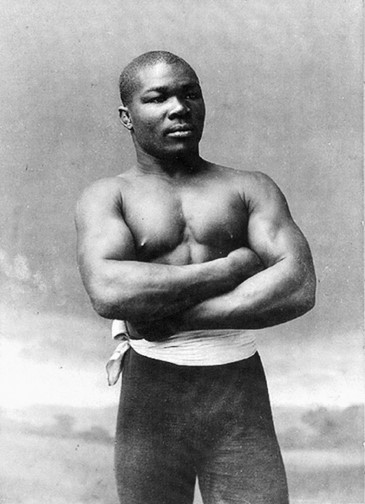

Personal information
- Nicknames: Barbados Demon; Black Demon
- Nationality: (Barbados) Bajan
- Born: Joe Walcott; March 13, 1873 Georgetown, Guyana
- Died: October 4, 1935 (aged 62) Massillon, Ohio, U.S.
- Height: 1.56 m (5 ft 1 in)
- Weight: Welterweight

Boxing career
- Reach: 65 in (165 cm)
- Stance: Orthodox

Boxing record
- Total fights: 157
- Wins: 96
- Win by KO: 57
- Losses: 31
- Draws: 27
- No contests: 3

Joe Walcott (March 13, 1873 – October 1, 1935) was a professional boxer from Barbados who reigned as the World Welterweight Champion from 1901 to 1906, becoming the first black man ever to capture the title. He is retrospectively known as Barbados Joe Walcott to distinguish him from American heavyweight Arnold Cream (1914–1994), who adopted the ring name Jersey Joe Walcott to honor his predecessor.

He was elected to The Ring Boxing Hall of Fame in 1955 and the International Boxing Hall of Fame in 1991.

Walcott had an exceptional power to his punch, with 60% of his wins achieved through knockout. His manager was Tom O'Rourke.

Nat Fleischer rated Walcott as the greatest welterweight of all time, and in 2003 he was included in the Ring Magazine's list of 100 greatest punchers of all time. He was elected to The Ring Boxing Hall of Fame in 1955 and the International Boxing Hall of Fame in 1991.

== Early life and career ==
Walcott was born on March 13, 1873, in British Guiana but migrated to Barbados at a young age. As a youngster, he set out to see the world and got a job as a cabin boy on a ship sailing to Boston that arrived around 1887. He settled in Boston as a piano mover and porter and took other odd jobs as well. Later, he landed a job in a gym and became popular with the best of the boxers as an able opponent before turning professional. His amateur boxing and wrestling years spanned roughly 1887 to 1889.

== Professional career ==
His early professional boxing years, between 1890 and 1896, were focused in the areas of Boston and New York City. One of his more noteworthy bouts included a 15-round draw with Mysterious Billy Smith and a 15-round loss to George "Kid Lavigne" in March and December 1895, respectively. He lost to Welsh-born middleweight Tommy West in 1894 and 1897. West acted as a sparring partner for Walcott in late October 1904.

=== First attempts at the world lightweight and welterweight championships ===
Walcott first challenged for the lightweight championship on October 29, 1897, at the Lennox Athletic Club in New York City, but he was TKO'ed by the champion George "Kid" Lavigne in the 12th round. He was also unsuccessful in his first attempt to win the world welterweight championship when Mysterious Billy Smith outpointed him on December 6, 1898. Walcott fought Smith, likely his most frequent opponent, six times in his career.

On February 23, 1900, Walcott met the Jewish light heavyweight Joe Choynski, winning in a surprising seventh-round TKO, though outweighed by 16 pounds and conceding his opponent a full foot advantage in height. Likely sensing the need for a quick start against his opponent, Walcott sent Choynski to the mat five times in the first round and was the aggressor throughout the bout. Choynski, a 3-1 betting favorite before the bout, suddenly became a 2-1 underdog after the bell ending the first round. Walcott seemed to have a slight advantage in the second, though Choynski landed a solid blow. By the third round, Walcott pressed his advantage with a superior defense and landed blows nearly at will before the sound of the bell. The fourth seemed even and the fifth entirely in Walcott's favor, but in the sixth Walcott cut Choynski's right eye. Walcott sent Choynski to the floor again in the seventh, battering his clearly exhausted opponent. Stopping the final round 38 seconds in, the referee said later that he "felt another blow to Choynski would have put him out."

On September 27, 1901, Walcott impressively defeated Irish boxer George Gardner in a twenty-round points decision at the Mechanic's Pavilion in San Francisco, California. The pre-fight betting was light before the match with Gardner a 10-8 favorite. Gardner, at just under six feet, and holding a serious reach advantage over Walcott, would briefly hold the light heavyweight championship of the world from July through November 1903. Walcott was the aggressor throughout the bout, landing more clean blows, though there was a great deal of clinching and wrestling throughout the furious bout, likely a result of the mismatch in reach between the two opponents. In the first round, Walcott brought Gardner to his knees from a left and right to the head for a nine count, though Gardner returned to the fighting unfazed.

=== Taking the world welterweight championship from Rube Ferns, 1901 ===
Walcott won the world welterweight title on December 18, 1901, in Buffalo, New York, from reigning champion James "Rube" Ferns achieving a technical knockout in the fifth round. Ferns, from the reaction of the Buffalo crowd as he entered the ring, appeared to be the favorite. Walcott sent Ferns to the floor twice in the fifth round, the first a solid blow to the jaw. Rube took the count both times. At the end, the referee stopped the bout to prevent a knockout. Ferns began to weaken as early as the third round, and in the fourth Walcott sent Ferns through the ropes. The bout featured a clinch in the fourth round that brought both boxers to the mat, possibly a result of a tiring Walcott attempting to counter Fern's six-inch height advantage and superior reach. The match brought roughly 2,000 spectators to the clubhouse, and tickets ranged from a respectable $2 to $5. The Toronto Star wrote "Walcott battered down Ferns with terrific body blows, and right and left swings to the head. To save Ferns from being completely knocked out, Referee McBride stopped the bout."

After the fight, Rube Ferns stated "Well, he won, and I have nothing to say against it. I don't know anybody at the weight - no, nor a good deal above it - that can beat him."

On June 23, 1902, Walcott faced Tommy West in a title defense of his world welterweight title, facing off against West for the sixth time. In their previous encounter in August 1900, the fight had gone as such according to a newspaper called the Durango Democrat: "The bout had gone eleven rounds very much in Wolcott's favor, as he had punished West very badly about the body and head and had him in a very weakened condition. When the bell rang for the twelfth round, to the surprise of everybody, Wolcott refused to go on, claiming he had injured his left arm. Referee Charlie White, suspecting crookedness, insisted upon Wolcott continuing, but [Wolcott] refused to do so, which left White no alternative other than to declare West the winner. There was quite a large sum of money wagered, with West as favorite and the referee is very outspoken in reference to Wolcott's peculiar actions. Manager Kennedy, on behalf of the club, announced that Wolcott's share of the money would not be given to him, but would be donated to some charitable institution." With their first 5 fights having been in America, they fought their final battle, for the world welterweight championship, at the National Sporting Club, Covent Garden in London, England. Walcott clearly outpointed the Welsh fighter and retained his championship with a 15 round points decision victory overseas.

On June 18, 1903, Walcott fought Young Peter Jackson, an exceptional black contender to a twenty-round draw, in Portland, Oregon, in a match billed as a world welterweight championship. The title did not change hands due to the draw decision. Walcott would later lose to Jackson on June 10, 1904, in a fourth-round knockout during a non-title fight in Baltimore, after receiving a punch to the stomach. Up until the time of the knockout, Walcott was considered to have a slight lead over Jackson, as his blows to the head and neck of his opponent were not landing with much force. Walcott had previously fought Jackson twice in the winter of 1902 to a win and a draw.

=== Controversy vs. Dixie Kid in title match, 1904 ===
On April 29, 1904, Walcott defended his title against black contender, Dixie Kid. He was winning the fight handily when the referee disqualified Walcott for no apparent reason in the final seconds of the 20th round. Dick "Duck" Sullivan," the referee, was a last-minute replacement, and Walcott protested the choice before the bout began. Walcott had appeared to have a clear advantage in all but the seventh round. Many in the crowd were shocked with the decision, and Walcott himself was immediately angered at Sullivan, who made the call. The match was disregarded as a title bout when it was discovered that Sullivan had bet on Dixie Kid to win the match.

=== Mid-career, and loss of the world welterweight championship to Honey Mellody, 1906 ===
==== Historic draw with Sam Langford, 1904 ====
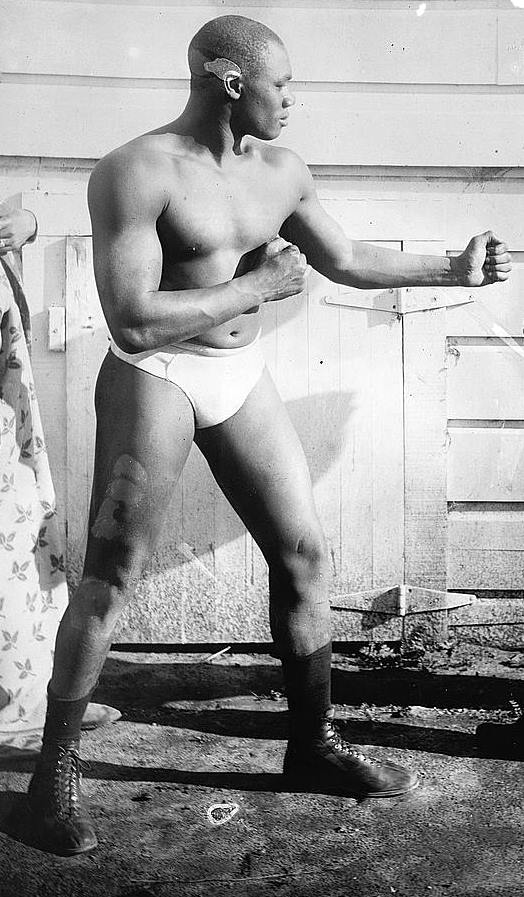
Sam Langford, circa 1910

Walcott fought the exceptional black boxer Sam Langford in a non-title fight before a modest crowd of 1,200 in Manchester, New Hampshire on September 5, 1904, with the fight ending in a fifteen-round draw.

Langford had the better of the bout for the first seven rounds and staged an excellent defence, but in the remaining eight rounds, Walcott fought furiously in a close battle where the crowd could not anticipate the outcome until the referee's decision. In the third round, Langford brought Walcott to one knee with a blow to the jaw.

==== Historic draw with lightweight champion Joe Gans, 1904 ====
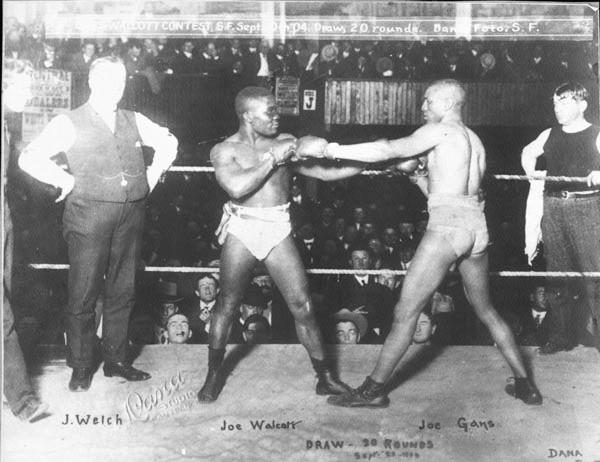
Walcott (left) with Joe Gans in 1904

Walcott met world lightweight champion Joe Gans in a non-title fight at Woodward's Pavilion in San Francisco on September 30, 1904, and scored a draw after 20 rounds. Many in the crowd believed Gans should have received the decision. The lightweight champion gained a lead from the second till the tenth, using his right almost exclusively on the body of Walcott. Walcott, however, put tremendous force behind his blows, weakening the lightweight Gans in several points in the bout.

After the tenth, Gans became the superior boxer, avoiding the blows of Walcott and connecting with solid rights and lefts to the face. In the nineteenth round, Gans landed a solid blow to Walcott's jaw that might have ended the fight. In the final round, Gans showed dominance in the in-fighting, though neither fighter took a clear lead. An examination after the fight showed that Walcott had broken his right elbow in the fourth round, though he continued to fight.

After the Gans fight, on October 18, 1904, Walcott accidentally shot himself in the hand, losing several fingers. Walcott took a year off of boxing to recover from the injury, but it may have effectively limited his remaining years as a world class prizefighter. Walcott, however, continued to box until 1911.

==== Loss of the world welterweight title to Honey Mellody, 1906 ====
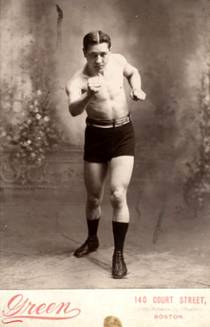
Honey Mellody, 1910s

Before a crowd of 3,000, Walcott officially lost the world welterweight championship on October 16, 1906, against William "Honey" Mellody at the Lincoln Athletic Club in Chelsea, Massachusetts. Falling to a twelfth-round technical knockout, Walcott quit the bout, claiming his left arm had been injured in the ninth round. In the first round Walcott scored a knockdown. Melody, fighting cautiously against the reigning champion, landed mostly body blows throughout the remainder of the fight, but scored enough to appear to dominate. In the sixth round, Mellody landed a strong right to the jaw which backed Walcott against the ropes. In the eleventh, Mellody landed punches at will, and in the final round he landed a flurry of rights to the stomach before Walcott retreated to his corner before the bell ending the bout.

Returning to the ring on January 15, 1907, Walcott lost a fifteen-round decision on points to Mike Donavan in Providence, Rhode Island. Though winning only a few of his remaining bouts, Walcott succeeded in twice beating George Cole, a competent hard hitting middleweight from Philadelphia, in December 1907 and January 1908. In fact, of their December meeting in Philadelphia, one source noted that "with the exception of the third round when Cole sent over some very hard punches, the "battle was Walcott's all the way."

On January 7, 1908, Walcott lost to a noteworthy opponent, Jimmy Gardner, in twelve rounds at the Armory in Boston. Gardner would become a world welterweight contender against Mike "Twin" Sullivan in April of that year. New York's Evening World stated that Walcott's performance "did not come up to expectations" and that Gardner's win "was one of the easiest victories he ever earned." On November 2, 1911, Walcott fought his last reported bout against Tom Sawyer in Lowell, Massachusetts. He walked out of the ring before the bell at the end of the one-sided 12-round technical knockout, and said to the crowd, "I'm 40 years old and I guess I'm done with this game."

== Later life ==
Walcott squandered a fortune earned in the ring and eventually found employment as a custodian at the old Madison Square Garden. He died at 62 on October 4, 1935. He was reported missing in December 1935, by his daughter. He had been last seen around Mansfield, Ohio, on a trip he was taking to find work in Hollywood. It was later reported he died in a car accident in Massillon, Ohio, fifty miles from Mansfield.

It was believed that Joe was walking along Route 30 in the village of Dalton, Ohio (8 miles west of Massillon) and was struck and killed by a car. His body was not claimed and the village of Dalton buried him at the edge of the cemetery. In 1955 a headstone that reads "Ex Worlds Champion Joe Walcott 1873-1935" was erected on the grave.

== Professional boxing record ==
All information in this section is derived from BoxRec, unless otherwise stated.

All newspaper decisions are officially regarded as "no decision" bouts. An unofficial record can be made by counting them as win/loss/draw decisions.

Official record

157 fights	87 wins	24 losses
By knockout	57	9
By decision	28	13
By disqualification	2	2
Draws	24	
No contests	3	
Newspaper decisions/draws	19	

Unofficial record

157 fights	96 wins	31 losses
By knockout	57	9
By decision	37	20
By disqualification	2	2
Draws	27	
No contests	3	

No.	Result	Official record	Unofficial record	Opponent	Type	Round	Date	Location	Notes
157	Loss	87–24–24 (22)	96–31–27 (3)	Tom Sawyer	TKO	8 (12)	Nov 2, 1910	Higgins Hall, Lowell, Massachusetts, U.S.	
156	Win	87–23–24 (22)	96–30–27 (3)	Bobby Lee	KO	2 (6)	Oct 17, 1910	Armory A.A., Boston, Massachusetts, U.S.	
155	Loss	86–23–24 (22)	95–30–27 (3)	Kyle Whitney	TKO	9 (12)	May 13, 1910	Young Men's S & AC, Brockton, Massachusetts, U.S.	
154	Loss	86–22–24 (22)	95–29–27 (3)	Bill MacKinnon	DQ	6 (12)	Apr 25, 1910	Young Men's S & AC, Brockton, Massachusetts, U.S.	
153	Draw	86–21–24 (22)	95–28–27 (3)	Jimmy Potts	PTS	10	Mar 7, 1910	Cooke's Gym, Minneapolis, Minnesota, U.S.	
152	Draw	86–21–23 (22)	95–28–26 (3)	Young Jack Johnson	PTS	6	Dec 3, 1909	Pastime Club, Haverhill, Massachusetts, U.S.	
151	Draw/ND	86–21–22 (22)	95–28–25 (3)	Tom Sawyer	NWS	6	Sep 6, 1909	Pastime A.C., Portland, Oregon, U.S.	
150	Loss	86–21–22 (21)	95–28–24 (3)	Thunderbolt Ed Smith	PTS	6	May 10, 1909	Gayety Theatre, Columbus, Ohio, U.S.	
149	Loss	86–20–22 (21)	95–27–24 (3)	Jack Robinson	PTS	10	Nov 18, 1908	Easton, Pennsylvania, U.S.	
148	Loss	86–19–22 (21)	95–26–24 (3)	Larry Temple	TKO	10 (10)	Nov 11, 1908	Armory A.A., Boston, Massachusetts, U.S.	
147	Loss	86–18–22 (21)	95–25–24 (3)	Bartley Connolly	PTS	6	Sep 7, 1908	Pastime A.C., Portland, Oregon, U.S.	
146	Loss/ND	86–17–22 (21)	95–24–24 (3)	Jack Robinson	NWS	6	Jul 15, 1908	Whirlwind A.C., New York City, New York, U.S.	
145	Loss/ND	86–17–22 (20)	95–23–24 (3)	Bill Hurley	NWS	7	Jun 29, 1908	Schenectady, New York, U.S.	
144	Win	86–17–22 (19)	95–22–24 (3)	Russell Van Horn	PTS	6	Jun 18, 1908	Columbus, Ohio, U.S.	
143	Win	85–17–22 (19)	94–22–24 (3)	Mike Lansing	PTS	6	Jun 16, 1908	Ontario A.C., Charlotte, New York, U.S.	
142	Win	84–17–22 (19)	93–22–24 (3)	Charles Kemp	TKO	5 (10)	Jun 11, 1908	Springfield, Ohio, U.S.	
141	Loss/ND	83–17–22 (19)	92–22–24 (3)	Charley Hitte	NWS	6	Apr 3, 1908	Schenectady, New York, U.S.	
140	Draw	83–17–22 (18)	92–21–24 (3)	Mike Donovan	PTS	6	Mar 3, 1908	Canandaigua, New York, U.S.	
139	Loss/ND	83–17–21 (18)	92–21–23 (3)	Terry Martin	NWS	6	Jan 30, 1908	Broadway A.C., Philadelphia, Pennsylvania, U.S.	
138	Draw	83–17–21 (17)	92–20–23 (3)	Mike Donovan	PTS	10	Jan 15, 1908	Maisonneuve Theatre, Montreal, Quebec, Canada	
137	Win/ND	83–17–20 (17)	92–20–22 (3)	George Cole	NWS	6	Jan 14, 1908	Troy, New York, U.S.	
136	Loss	83–17–20 (16)	91–20–22 (3)	Jimmy Gardner	PTS	20	Jan 7, 1908	Armory A.A., Boston, Massachusetts, U.S.	
135	Win/ND	83–16–20 (16)	91–19–22 (3)	George Cole	NWS	6	Dec 26, 1907	Broadway A.C., Philadelphia, Pennsylvania, U.S.	
134	Draw	83–16–20 (15)	90–19–22 (3)	Mike Donovan	PTS	15	Oct 24, 1907	Standard A.C., Lymansville, Rhode Island, U.S.	
133	Win	83–16–19 (15)	90–19–21 (3)	Billy Payne	KO	6 (?)	Oct 17, 1907	Portland, Oregon, U.S.	
132	Draw	82–16–19 (15)	89–19–21 (3)	Mike Donovan	PTS	10	Jun 18, 1907	Brazil, Indiana, U.S.	
131	Loss	82–16–18 (15)	89–19–20 (3)	Mike Donovan	PTS	10	Jan 15, 1907	Providence, Rhode Island, U.S.	
130	Loss	82–15–18 (15)	89–18–20 (3)	William "Honey" Mellody	TKO	12 (15)	Nov 29, 1906	Lincoln A.C., Chelsea, Massachusetts, U.S.	For world welterweight title
129	Loss	82–14–18 (15)	89–17–20 (3)	William "Honey" Mellody	PTS	15	Oct 16, 1906	Lincoln A.C., Chelsea, Massachusetts, U.S.	Lost world welterweight title
128	Draw	82–13–18 (15)	89–16–20 (3)	Billy Rhodes	PTS	20	Sep 29, 1906	Sand on island off the Missouri River, 12mi from KC, Kansas City, Missouri, U.S.	Retained world welterweight title
127	Win	82–13–17 (15)	89–16–19 (3)	Jack Dougherty	KO	8 (15)	Jul 10, 1906	Lincoln A.C., Chelsea, Massachusetts, U.S.	Retained world welterweight title
126	Win	81–13–17 (15)	88–16–19 (3)	Dave Holly	DQ	3 (3)	Jan 25, 1906	Long Acre A.C., New York City, New York, U.S.	
125	Draw	80–13–17 (15)	87–16–19 (3)	Joe Gans	PTS	20	Sep 30, 1904	Woodward's Pavilion, San Francisco, California, U.S.	It was announced before the fight that no title was at stake.
124	Loss/ND	80–13–16 (15)	87–16–18 (3)	Dave Holly	NWS	6	Sep 10, 1904	National A.C., Philadelphia, Pennsylvania, U.S.	
123	Draw	80–13–16 (14)	87–15–18 (3)	Sam Langford	PTS	15	Sep 5, 1904	Lake Massabesic Coliseum, Manchester, New Hampshire, U.S.	Retained world welterweight title
122	Draw	80–13–15 (14)	87–15–17 (3)	Larry Temple	PTS	10	Jul 1, 1904	Germania Maennerchor Hall, Baltimore, Maryland, U.S.	
121	Win	80–13–14 (14)	87–15–16 (3)	Mike Donovan	TKO	5 (10)	Jun 24, 1904	Germania Maennerchor Hall, Baltimore, Maryland, U.S.	
120	Loss	79–13–14 (14)	86–15–16 (3)	Young Peter Jackson	KO	4 (10)	Jun 10, 1904	Germania Maennerchor Hall, Baltimore, Maryland, U.S.	Walcott claimed a foul after getting knocked down from a punch to the stomach
119	Draw	79–12–14 (14)	86–14–16 (3)	Sandy Ferguson	PTS	10	May 23, 1904	Auditorium, Portland, Oregon, U.S.	Pre-arranged draw if lasting the distance
118	Loss	79–12–13 (14)	86–14–15 (3)	Dixie Kid	DQ	20 (20)	Apr 29, 1904	Woodward's Pavilion, San Francisco, California, U.S.	World welterweight title at stake; Disregarded as a title fight as the ref had bet on Dixie Kid; Walcott was DQ'd for a kidney punch, despite landing them throughout with no warning of foul
117	Loss/ND	79–11–13 (14)	86–13–15 (3)	Black Bill	NWS	6	Feb 26, 1904	Lenox A.C., Philadelphia, Pennsylvania, U.S.	
116	Win	79–11–13 (13)	86–12–15 (3)	Charlie Haghey	KO	3 (10)	Jan 18, 1904	New Bedford, Massachusetts, U.S.	
115	Win	78–11–13 (13)	85–12–15 (3)	Larry Temple	PTS	15	Dec 29, 1903	Criterion A.C., Boston, Massachusetts, U.S.	
114	Loss	77–11–13 (13)	84–12–15 (3)	Sandy Ferguson	PTS	15	Nov 10, 1903	Criterion A.C., Boston, Massachusetts, U.S.	Walcott weighed 148lbs and Ferguson weighed 205lbs
113	Win	77–10–13 (13)	84–11–15 (3)	Kid Carter	PTS	15	Nov 3, 1903	Criterion A.C., Boston, Massachusetts, U.S.	
112	Win	76–10–13 (13)	83–11–15 (3)	Kid Carter	PTS	15	Oct 13, 1903	Criterion A.C., Boston, Massachusetts, U.S.	
111	Win	75–10–13 (13)	82–11–15 (3)	Tom Carey	KO	5 (?)	Sep 21, 1903	Central A.C., Boston, Massachusetts, U.S.	
110	Win/ND	74–10–13 (13)	81–11–15 (3)	Joe Grim	NWS	6	Sep 12, 1903	State A.C., Philadelphia, Pennsylvania, U.S.	
109	Win	74–10–13 (12)	80–11–15 (3)	Tom Carey	KO	8 (15)	Aug 13, 1903	Tammany A.C., Boston, Massachusetts, U.S.	
108	Win	73–10–13 (12)	79–11–15 (3)	Mose LaFontise	KO	3 (20)	Jul 3, 1903	Balanee Box, Portland, Oregon, U.S.	Retained world welterweight title
107	Draw	72–10–13 (12)	78–11–15 (3)	Young Peter Jackson	PTS	20	Jun 18, 1903	Balanee Box, Portland, Oregon, U.S.	Retained world welterweight title
106	Win	72–10–12 (12)	78–11–14 (3)	Mysterious Billy Smith	TKO	4 (20)	May 28, 1903	Exposition Building, Portland, Oregon, U.S.	
105	Draw	71–10–12 (12)	77–11–14 (3)	Philadelphia Jack O'Brien	PTS	10	Apr 20, 1903	Health & Physical Culture A.C., Boston, Massachusetts, U.S.	Pre-arranged draw if lasting the distance.
104	Win	71–10–11 (12)	77–11–13 (3)	Mike Donovan	PTS	10	Apr 15, 1903	Health & Physical Culture A.C., Boston, Massachusetts, U.S.	
103	Draw	70–10–11 (12)	76–11–13 (3)	Billy Woods	PTS	20	Apr 2, 1903	Hazard's Pavilion, Los Angeles, California, U.S	
102	Win	70–10–10 (12)	76–11–12 (3)	George Cole	KO	4 (10)	Mar 18, 1903	Kenyon's Hall, Allegheny, New York, U.S.	
101	Win	69–10–10 (12)	75–11–12 (3)	Charlie Haghey	KO	5 (15)	Mar 11, 1903	Criterion A.C., Boston, Massachusetts, U.S.	
100	Win	68–10–10 (12)	74–11–12 (3)	Mike Donovan	PTS	10	Mar 9, 1903	Masonic Hall, Pittsburgh, Pennsylvania, U.S.	
99	Loss	67–10–10 (12)	73–11–12 (3)	Frank Childs	TKO	3 (6)	Oct 9, 1902	Apollo A.C., Chicago, Illinois, U.S.	For world colored heavyweight title claim
98	NC	67–9–10 (12)	73–10–12 (3)	George Cole	NC	4 (6)	Oct 6, 1902	Golden Gate A.C., Philadelphia, Pennsylvania, U.S.	
97	Win	67–9–10 (11)	73–10–12 (2)	Tommy West	PTS	15	Jun 23, 1902	National Sporting Club, Covent Garden, London, England	Retained world welterweight title
96	Loss	66–9–10 (11)	72–10–12 (2)	George Gardiner	PTS	20	Apr 25, 1902	Woodward's Pavilion, San Francisco, California, U.S.	
95	Loss/ND	66–8–10 (11)	72–9–12 (2)	Philadelphia Jack O'Brien	NWS	6	Apr 11, 1902	Industrial A.C., Philadelphia, Pennsylvania, U.S.	
94	Draw	66–8–10 (10)	72–8–12 (2)	Fred Russell	PTS	6	Apr 4, 1902	Brand's Hall, Chicago, Illinois, U.S.	
93	Win	66–8–9 (10)	72–8–11 (2)	Billy Stift	PTS	6	Mar 15, 1902	Chicago A.C., Chicago, Illinois, U.S.	
92	Draw	65–8–9 (10)	71–8–11 (2)	Young Peter Jackson	PTS	10	Mar 13, 1902	Germania Maennerchor Hall, Baltimore, Maryland, U.S.	
91	Win	65–8–8 (10)	71–8–10 (2)	Jimmy Handler	KO	2 (6)	Feb 14, 1902	Industrial Hall, Philadelphia, Pennsylvania, U.S.	
90	Win/ND	64–8–8 (10)	70–8–10 (2)	Young Peter Jackson	NWS	6	Jan 13, 1902	Penn Art Club, Philadelphia, Pennsylvania, U.S.	
89	Win	64–8–8 (9)	69–8–10 (2)	Rube Ferns	TKO	5 (20)	Dec 18, 1901	International A.C., Fort Erie, Ontario, Canada	Won world welterweight title
88	Win	63–8–8 (9)	68–8–10 (2)	Young Peter Jackson	PTS	20	Nov 28, 1901	Music Hall, Baltimore, Maryland, U.S.	
87	Loss	62–8–8 (9)	67–8–10 (2)	Kid Carter	KO	7 (?)	Oct 15, 1901	National A.C., San Francisco, California, U.S.	
86	Win	62–7–8 (9)	67–7–10 (2)	George Gardiner	PTS	20	Sep 27, 1901	Mechanic's Pavilion, San Francisco, California, U.S.	
85	Win	61–7–8 (9)	66–7–10 (2)	Jack Bonner	PTS	15	Jul 26, 1901	Park City Theater, Bridgeport, Connecticut, U.S.	
84	Win	60–7–8 (9)	65–7–10 (2)	Charlie McKeever	TKO	6 (20)	Mar 21, 1901	Auditorium, Waterbury, Connecticut, U.S.	
83	Loss	59–7–8 (9)	64–7–10 (2)	Kid Carter	DQ	19 (20)	Jan 17, 1901	Empire A.C., Hartford, Connecticut, U.S.	Disqualified for hitting in the clinches
82	Win	59–6–8 (9)	64–6–10 (2)	Wild Bill Hanrahan	KO	12 (?)	Dec 13, 1900	Coliseum, Hartford, Connecticut, U.S.	
81	Win	58–6–8 (9)	63–6–10 (2)	Mysterious Billy Smith	DQ	10 (20)	Sep 24, 1900	Coliseum, Hartford, Connecticut, U.S.	
80	Loss	57–6–8 (9)	62–6–10 (2)	Tommy West	TKO	11 (?)	Aug 27, 1900	Madison Square Garden, New York City, New York, U.S.	Walcott refused to go on, claiming he had broken his left arm.
79	Win/ND	57–5–8 (9)	62–5–10 (2)	Jack Bonner	NWS	6	May 11, 1900	Industrial Hall, Philadelphia, Pennsylvania, U.S.	
78	Win	57–5–8 (8)	61–5–10 (2)	Mysterious Billy Smith	PTS	25	May 4, 1900	Broadway A.C., New York City, New York, U.S.	
77	Win	56–5–8 (8)	60–5–10 (2)	Dick Moore	KO	4 (20)	Apr 10, 1900	Eureka A.C., Baltimore, Maryland, U.S.	
76	Win	55–5–8 (8)	59–5–10 (2)	Andy Walsh	PTS	20	Mar 29, 1900	Broadway A.C., New York City, New York, U.S.	
75	Win	54–5–8 (8)	58–5–10 (2)	Joe Choynski	TKO	7 (20)	Feb 23, 1900	Broadway A.C., New York City, New York, U.S.	
74	Win	53–5–8 (8)	57–5–10 (2)	Bobby Dobbs	KO	6 (20)	Dec 5, 1899	Broadway A.C., Brooklyn, New York City, New York, U.S.	
73	Win	52–5–8 (8)	56–5–10 (2)	Dan Creedon	PTS	20	Nov 29, 1899	Tattersall's, Chicago, Illinois, U.S.	
72	Win	51–5–8 (8)	55–5–10 (2)	Dan Creedon	PTS	6	Nov 25, 1899	Tattersall's, Chicago, Illinois, U.S.	
71	Win	50–5–8 (8)	54–5–10 (2)	Dan Creedon	PTS	20	Jun 23, 1899	Ford Opera House, Baltimore, Maryland, U.S.	
70	Win	49–5–8 (8)	53–5–10 (2)	Harry Fisher	TKO	12 (20)	Jun 12, 1899	Ford Opera House, Baltimore, Maryland, U.S.	
69	Win	48–5–8 (8)	52–5–10 (2)	Jimmy Watts	KO	8 (20)	May 30, 1899	Louisville, Kentucky, U.S.	
68	Win	47–5–8 (8)	51–5–10 (2)	Dick O'Brien	KO	14 (20)	May 19, 1899	Broadway A.C., Brooklyn, New York City, New York, U.S.	
67	Win	46–5–8 (8)	50–5–10 (2)	Charley Johnson	TKO	10 (15)	May 8, 1899	Ariel A.C., Athens, Pennsylvania, U.S.	
66	Win	45–5–8 (8)	49–5–10 (2)	Dan Creedon	KO	1 (20)	Apr 25, 1899	Lenox A.C., New York City, New York, U.S.	
65	Win	44–5–8 (8)	48–5–10 (2)	Jim Judge	KO	11 (20)	Apr 8, 1899	Empire A.C., Toronto, Ontario, Canada	
64	Win	43–5–8 (8)	47–5–10 (2)	Australian Billy Edwards	KO	13 (20)	Mar 16, 1899	New Broadway A.C., Brooklyn, New York City, New York, U.S.	
63	Win	42–5–8 (8)	46–5–10 (2)	Australian Jim Ryan	KO	14 (15)	Feb 4, 1899	Stag A.C., Cincinnati, Ohio, U.S.	
62	Loss	41–5–8 (8)	45–5–10 (2)	Mysterious Billy Smith	PTS	20	Dec 6, 1898	Lenox A.C., New York City, New York, U.S.	For world welterweight title
61	Win/ND	41–4–8 (8)	45–4–10 (2)	Bob Montgomery	NWS	6	Nov 14, 1898	Auditorium, Detroit, Michigan, U.S.	
60	Draw	41–4–8 (7)	44–4–10 (2)	Kid McPartland	PTS	8	Apr 28, 1898	Auditorium, Detroit, Michigan, U.S.	
59	Win/ND	41–4–7 (7)	44–4–9 (2)	Tommy West	NWS	6	Apr 22, 1898	Arena A.C., Philadelphia, Pennsylvania, U.S.	
58	Draw	41–4–7 (6)	43–4–9 (2)	Mysterious Billy Smith	PTS	25	Apr 14, 1898	Park City Theater, Bridgeport, Connecticut, U.S.	
57	Draw	41–4–6 (6)	43–4–8 (2)	Tom Tracey	PTS	6	Dec 27, 1897	Winter Circus Building, Chicago, Illinois, U.S.	
56	Loss	41–4–5 (6)	43–4–7 (2)	George "Kid" Lavigne	TKO	12 (20)	Oct 29, 1897	Mechanic's Pavilion, San Francisco, California, U.S.	For world lightweight title
55	Win	41–3–5 (6)	43–3–7 (2)	George "Young Corbett" Green	KO	18 (?)	Aug 26, 1897	Woodward's Pavilion, San Francisco, California, U.S.	
54	Win/ND	40–3–5 (6)	42–3–7 (2)	Tom Tracey	NWS	6	Jun 14, 1897	Arena, Philadelphia, Pennsylvania, U.S.	
53	Draw	40–3–5 (5)	41–3–7 (2)	Jimmy Watts	PTS	4	Apr 20, 1897	Broadway A.C., Brooklyn, New York City, New York, U.S.	
52	Loss	40–3–4 (5)	41–3–6 (2)	Tommy West	PTS	20	Mar 3, 1897	Broadway A.C., Brooklyn, New York City, New York, U.S.	
51	Win/ND	40–2–4 (5)	41–2–6 (2)	Bobby Dobbs	NWS	6	Jan 16, 1897	Southwark A.C., Philadelphia, Pennsylvania, U.S.	
50	Draw	40–2–4 (4)	40–2–6 (2)	Tommy West	PTS	19 (20)	Dec 9, 1896	Marlborough A.C., New York City, New York, U.S.	The bout was scheduled for twenty rounds, but cut short without reason by the timekeeper
49	Win	40–2–3 (4)	40–2–5 (2)	Scaldy Bill Quinn	KO	17 (20)	Oct 12, 1896	Empire A.C., Maspeth, Queens, New York City, New York, U.S.	
48	Win	39–2–3 (4)	39–2–5 (2)	Dick O'Brien	PTS	6	Aug 24, 1896	City Hall, Lewiston, Maine, U.S.	
47	Win	38–2–3 (4)	38–2–5 (2)	Scaldy Bill Quinn	PTS	20	May 29, 1896	Woburn Rink, Woburn, Massachusetts, U.S.	
46	Win	37–2–3 (4)	37–2–5 (2)	Scott Bright Eyes Collins	KO	7 (20)	Mar 16, 1896	Puritan A.C., New York City, New York, U.S.	
45	Win	36–2–3 (4)	36–2–5 (2)	Jim Jackson	PTS	4	Jan 30, 1896	Madison Square Garden, New York City, New York, U.S.	
44	Win	35–2–3 (4)	35–2–5 (2)	Teddy McMahon	KO	1 (?)	Jan 7, 1896	Alhambra, Syracuse, New York, U.S.	
43	Loss	34–2–3 (4)	34–2–5 (2)	George "Kid" Lavigne	PTS	15	Dec 21, 1895	Empire A.C., Maspeth, Queens, New York City, New York, U.S.	For American lightweight title Agreement called for Lavigne to be the winner if he was not knocked out
42	Win	34–1–3 (4)	34–1–5 (2)	Dick O'Brien	TKO	1 (25)	Aug 28, 1895	West Newton Street Armory, Boston, Massachusetts, U.S.	
41	Win	33–1–3 (4)	33–1–5 (2)	Mick Dunn	TKO	8 (20)	Apr 3, 1895	Sea Side A.C., Coney Island, New York, U.S.	police stopped the fight. Dunn was totally out-classed.
40	Win	32–1–3 (4)	32–1–5 (2)	Charley Chapman	PTS	4	Mar 6, 1895	New York City, New York, U.S.	
39	Draw	31–1–3 (4)	31–1–5 (2)	Mysterious Billy Smith	PTS	15	Mar 1, 1895	Music Hall, Boston, Massachusetts, U.S.	Reported for the 140lbs Championship of America
38	Win	31–1–2 (4)	31–1–4 (2)	Billy Green	KO	2 (?)	Nov 15, 1894	Louisville, Kentucky, U.S.	
37	Win	30–1–2 (4)	30–1–4 (2)	George Thomas	KO	1 (?)	Nov 14, 1894	Louisville, Kentucky, U.S.	
36	Win	29–1–2 (4)	29–1–4 (2)	Shorty Ahearn	KO	3 (?)	Nov 3, 1894	Chicago, Illinois, U.S.	
35	Win	28–1–2 (4)	28–1–4 (2)	Frank Neil	TKO	3 (3)	Nov 2, 1894	Clark Street Theater, Chicago, Illinois, U.S.	
34	Win	27–1–2 (4)	27–1–4 (2)	Frank Carpenter	PTS	3	Nov 1, 1894	Chicago, Illinois, U.S.	
33	Win	26–1–2 (4)	26–1–4 (2)	Austin Gibbons	KO	4 (10)	Oct 15, 1894	Atlantic A.C., Coney Island, New York, U.S.	
32	Win	25–1–2 (4)	25–1–4 (2)	Jim Bagley	KO	2 (?)	Sep 20, 1894	Pittsburgh, Pennsylvania, U.S.	
31	Win	24–1–2 (4)	24–1–4 (2)	Dick O'Brien	PTS	12	Jul 6, 1894	Casino, Boston, Massachusetts, U.S.	
30	Win	23–1–2 (4)	23–1–4 (2)	Mike Harris	KO	6 (?)	Jun 22, 1894	Casino A.C., Boston, Massachusetts, U.S.	
29	ND	22–1–2 (4)	22–1–4 (2)	Charley Holcombe	ND	4	May 10, 1894	Kernan's Theatre, Washington Kernan's Theatre, Washington, D.C., U.S.	
28	Win	22–1–2 (3)	22–1–4 (1)	Tom Tracey	TKO	16 (?)	Apr 19, 1894	Music Hall, Boston, Massachusetts, U.S.	Billed for world 140lbs title
27	Win	21–1–2 (3)	21–1–4 (1)	Mike Welsh	KO	2 (10)	Feb 26, 1894	Lafayette A.C., Boston, Massachusetts, U.S.	
26	Win	20–1–2 (3)	20–1–4 (1)	Tommy West	PTS	3	Jan 11, 1894	Clan-na-Gael Hall, Boston, Massachusetts, U.S.	
25	Win	19–1–2 (3)	19–1–4 (1)	Ed Russell	KO	2 (?)	Dec 28, 1893	Lafayette A.C., Boston, Massachusetts, U.S.	
24	NC	18–1–2 (3)	18–1–4 (1)	Harry Tracy	NC	1 (?)	Dec 1, 1893	Camden Street A.C., Boston, Massachusetts, U.S.	
23	Win	18–1–2 (2)	18–1–4	Jack Hall	KO	1 (4)	Aug 22, 1893	Madison Square Garden, New York City, New York, U.S.	
22	Loss	17–1–2 (2)	17–1–4	Mike Harris	PTS	4	Jun 17, 1893	Academy of Music, New York City, New York, U.S.	
21	Win	17–0–2 (2)	17–0–4	Paddy McGuigan	PTS	10	Jun 5, 1893	Caledonian Park, Newark, New Jersey, U.S.	
20	Win	16–0–2 (2)	16–0–4	Patrick Conlon	TKO	2 (4)	Feb 17, 1893	Howard Athenaeum, Boston, Massachusetts, U.S.	
19	Win	15–0–2 (2)	15–0–4	Lewllyn Wetzell Brown	TKO	3 (4)	Feb 17, 1893	Howard Athenaeum, Boston, Massachusetts, U.S.	
18	Win	14–0–2 (2)	14–0–4	Thomas Chase	TKO	1 (4)	Feb 16, 1893	Howard Athenaeum, Boston, Massachusetts, U.S.	
17	Win	13–0–2 (2)	13–0–4	Al Hagen	TKO	3 (4)	Feb 15, 1893	Howard Athenaeum, Boston, Massachusetts, U.S.	
16	Win	12–0–2 (2)	12–0–4	William Quinn	KO	2 (4)	Feb 14, 1893	Howard Athenaeum, Boston, Massachusetts, U.S.	
15	Win	11–0–2 (2)	11–0–4	Jack Friesse	TKO	? (4)	Feb 10, 1893	Miner's Bowery Theatre, New York City, New York, U.S.	
14	Win	10–0–2 (2)	10–0–4	Jim Carroll	TKO	1 (?)	Feb 9, 1893	Miner's Bowery Theatre, New York City, New York, U.S.	
13	Win	9–0–2 (2)	9–0–4	Harrity	KO	3 (?)	Feb 2, 1893	New York City, New York, U.S.	
12	Win	8–0–2 (2)	8–0–4	Tom McCarthy	TKO	1 (4)	Jan 31, 1893	Miner's Bowery Theatre, New York City, New York, U.S.	
11	Win	7–0–2 (2)	7–0–4	Billy Harris	KO	2 (?)	Dec 8, 1892	New York City, New York, U.S.	
10	Draw	6–0–2 (2)	6–0–4	Sam Bolen	PTS	4	Dec 5, 1892	New York City, New York, U.S.	
9	Win	6–0–1 (2)	6–0–3	Jack Connors	KO	1 (?)	Dec 5, 1892	New York City, New York, U.S.	
8	Win	5–0–1 (2)	5–0–3	Johnny Lyman	KO	1 (?)	Nov 12, 1892	Philadelphia, Pennsylvania, U.S.	
7	Win	4–0–1 (2)	4–0–3	Charley Jones	PTS	3	Nov 11, 1892	Lyceum Theater, Philadelphia, Pennsylvania, U.S.	
6	Win	3–0–1 (2)	3–0–3	Stonewall Allen	TKO	3 (4)	Nov 5, 1892	Howard Athenaeum, Boston, Massachusetts, U.S.	
5	Draw	2–0–1 (2)	2–0–3	Harry Tracy	PTS	5	Nov 4, 1892	Howard Athenaeum, Boston, Massachusetts, U.S.	
4	Draw/ND	2–0 (2)	2–0–2	Andy Watson	NWS	4	Oct 29, 1892	Ariel A.C., Philadelphia, Pennsylvania, U.S.	
3	Win	2–0 (1)	2–0–1	Joe Jarg	PTS	3	Oct 22, 1892	Philadelphia, Pennsylvania, U.S.	
2	Draw/ND	1–0 (1)	1–0–1	Fred Morris	NWS	4	Oct 22, 1892	Ariel A.C., Philadelphia, Pennsylvania, U.S.	
1	Win	1–0	1–0	Black Pearl	PTS	4	Oct 15, 1892	Philadelphia, Pennsylvania, U.S.	1–0

== Boxing honors and achievements ==
Achievements
Preceded by Rube Ferns	World Welterweight Champion; December 18, 1901 – October 16, 1906	Succeeded by William "Honey" Mellody

== See also ==
- Lineal championship
- List of welterweight boxing champions
