= Harris Martin =

American boxer

- Harris Martin in Minneapolis, 1887

Personal information
- Nickname: The Black Pearl
- Born: April 2, 1865 Washington, D.C., U.S.
- Died: April 26, 1903 (aged 38) Saint Paul, Minnesota, U.S.
- Height: 5 ft 6 in (168 cm)
- Weight: 150 lb (68 kg)

Boxing career

Boxing record
- Wins: 53
- Win by KO: 39
- Losses: 11 (7 by KO)
- Draws: 15 (1 newspaper loss)

Harris Martin (April 2, 1865 – April 26, 1903) was an American boxer known as "The Black Pearl". He declared himself the first colored middleweight champion of the world after a fight with "Black Frank" Taylor in Minneapolis in 1887. Harris' legacy is that of being one of the first African-American boxing celebrities in the United States, with public acclaim during his time extending throughout the Midwest region. Over a century after his death, Harris was inducted into the Minnesota Boxing Hall of Fame in 2010.

== Early life ==
Harris Martin was born in Washington, D.C., on April 2, 1865. There is little historic record of his pre-boxing career life.

== Career ==
Harris' boxing acumen was discovered while he worked as a waiter at a hotel in Minneapolis, Minnesota. As Harris began boxing in backrooms and outside saloons, he gained a reputation for his "sledgehammer" punches and came to be known as "The Black Pearl". At just 5 ft 6 in (1.68 m) tall and weighing 150 pounds, Martin was a muscular and compact fighter. Charles Hadley and George Phillips, two other prominent African American boxers, served as his trainers.

Martin declared himself the world colored middleweight champion after beating "Black Frank" Taylor in Minneapolis on May 2, 1887, when he knocked out Taylor in the 38th or 40th round of their bout. Harris and Taylor had fought six times between December 22, 1886, and the title bout; Martin lost their first fight, won the second, then drew the next four contests. (They then fought an exhibition.)

After beating Taylor, Martin declared himself the World Colored Middleweight Champion. (They fought one more time that December, a bout that resulted in a draw.) Harris lost his title to Ed Binney on November 30, 1891, in San Francisco, California. On February 29, 1892, he was defeated by Charley Turner, "The Stockton Cyclone", who claimed the title but never defended it. Binney was considered the lineal champ.

Martin racked up a career record of 53 wins (with 39 K.O.s) against 11 losses (K.O.-ed seven times) and 15 draws. He lost one newspaper decision.

== Personal life and death ==
Harris was married, but later divorced. Drinking and socializing dominated the later part of his boxing career and post-career life. After several arrests, he was banned from being in the City of Minneapolis. In 1900, after he retired from his 15-year boxing career, he moved to Seattle, Washington. He later moved back to Minnesota and resided in Saint Paul.

Harris died from heart failure on April 26, 1903, in Saint Paul at the age of 38. His funeral was a major event in the Twin Cities. He was buried at the Forest Lawn Memorial Park in Maplewood.

== Legacy ==
Harris is considered a pioneer in the sport of boxing around the turn of the 20th century alongside Oscar Gardner, Danny Needham, Patrick Killen, and others. He was one of the first notable African American athletes in the Midwestern United States. Harris was inducted into the Minnesota Boxing Hall of Fame in 2010.

== Professional boxing record ==
All information in this section is derived from BoxRec, unless otherwise stated.

=== Official record ===
83 fights	54 wins	11 losses
By knockout	40	7
By decision	13	4
By disqualification	1	0
Draws	15	
No contests	2	
Newspaper decisions/draws	1	

All newspaper decisions are officially regarded as “no decision” bouts and are not counted to the win/loss/draw column.

No.	Result	Record	Opponent	Type	Round	Date	Location	Notes
83	Win	54–11–15 (3)	Mr. Thomas	TKO	4 (?)	Dec 15, 1900	Clark and Langes Clubroom, Salt Lake City, Utah, US	
82	Loss	53–11–15 (3)	Young Peter Jackson	KO	2 (?)	Dec 20, 1899	Germania Hall, Seattle, Washington, US	
81	Draw	53–10–15 (3)	Jim Sellars	PTS	8	Oct 20, 1899	Sioux City A.C., Sioux City, Iowa, US	
80	Loss	53–10–14 (3)	Con Jacobus	TKO	4 (?)	Sep 18, 1899	Woodland Park, Sioux City, Iowa, US	
79	Draw	53–9–14 (3)	Jim Sellars	PTS	10	Sep 13, 1899	Opera House, Sioux City, Iowa, US	
78	Loss	53–9–13 (3)	Charley Holcombe	NWS	6	Feb 6, 1897	Nonpareil A.C., Philadelphia, Pennsylvania, US	
77	Loss	53–9–13 (2)	Andy Watson	PTS	4	Jan 16, 1897	Nonpareil A.C., Philadelphia, Pennsylvania, US	
76	Draw	53–8–13 (2)	Jack Ramsey	PTS	20	Mar 3, 1894	Fort Collins, Colorado, US	
75	Loss	53–8–12 (2)	Bobby Dobbs	KO	19 (?)	Jan 30, 1893	Armory, San Francisco, California, US	A fight to the finish
74	Loss	53–7–12 (2)	Joe King	KO	36 (?)	Oct 21, 1892	California A.C., San Francisco, California, US	
73	Win	53–6–12 (2)	Tom Harrington	KO	2 (?)	May 31, 1892	Pacific A.C., San Francisco, California, US	Exact date uncertain
72	Draw	52–6–12 (2)	Jimmy Lawler	PTS	10	Apr 18, 1892	California A.C., San Francisco, California, US	Exact date uncertain
71	Win	52–6–11 (2)	Ed Moehler	KO	2 (?)	Apr 7, 1892	San Francisco, California, US	Exact date uncertain
70	Loss	51–6–11 (2)	Hank Griffin	KO	4 (?)	Apr 1, 1892	Location unknown	Date uncertain
69	Loss	51–5–11 (2)	Charles Turner	KO	19	Feb 29, 1892	Occidental A.C., San Francisco, California, US	A fight to the finish
68	Loss	51–4–11 (2)	Ed Binney	RTD	25 (?)	Nov 30, 1891	California A.C., San Francisco, California, US	Lost world colored middleweight title
67	Win	51–3–11 (2)	Paddy Gorman	KO	4 (?)	Oct 26, 1891	Pacific A.C., San Francisco, California, US	
66	ND	50–3–11 (2)	Spike Trainor	ND	4	Sep 5, 1891	Arion Hall, Great Falls, Montana, US	
65	Win	50–3–11 (1)	George Gannon	KO	3 (?)	Aug 23, 1891	Falke's Garden, Butte, Montana, US	
64	Win	49–3–11 (1)	Joe Ellingsworth	KO	5 (?)	Jul 21, 1891	Twin City A.C., Minneapolis, Minnesota, US	
63	Win	48–3–11 (1)	Tom Murray	KO	7 (?)	May 29, 1891	Twin City A.C., Minneapolis, Minnesota, US	
62	Win	47–3–11 (1)	Mike Sullivan	KO	1 (?)	May 16, 1891	Minneapolis, Minnesota, US	
61	Loss	46–3–11 (1)	Jerry Heggerty	PTS	5	May 12, 1891	Minneapolis, Minnesota, US	
60	Win	46–2–11 (1)	Frank Lewis	TKO	5 (6)	May 7, 1891	Minneapolis, Minnesota, US	
59	ND	45–2–11 (1)	Bob Fitzsimmons	ND	4	May 1, 1891	Washington Rink, Minneapolis, Minnesota, US	
58	Draw	45–2–11	Denny Kelliher	PTS	10	Feb 10, 1891	Newmarket Theatre, Saint Paul, Minnesota, US	Retained Northwest middleweight title
57	Win	45–2–10	Jim Hightower	KO	3 (?)	Nov 20, 1890	Omaha, Nebraska, US	
56	Win	44–2–10	Denny Kelliher	PTS	20	Nov 3, 1890	Twin City A.C., Minneapolis, Missouri, US	Retained Northwest middleweight title
55	Win	43–2–10	Jim Hightower	PTS	8	Sep 9, 1890	Saint Joseph, Missouri, US	
54	Draw	42–2–10	Frank Lewis	PTS	8	Jun 27, 1890	Saint Paul, Minnesota, US	
53	Win	42–2–9	Dick Moore	TKO	4 (6)	May 23, 1890	Olympic Theater, Saint Paul, Minnesota, US	Retained Northwest middleweight title
52	Win	41–2–9	Dick Moore	KO	7 (?)	Feb 3, 1890	Minneapolis, Minnesota, US	Won vacant Northwest middleweight title
51	Win	40–2–9	Ed Moehler	KO	8 (?)	Dec 9, 1888	Comique Theater, Minneapolis, Minnesota, US	
50	Win	39–2–9	James Aster	KO	1 (?)	Oct 5, 1888	Comique Theater, Minneapolis, Minnesota, US	
49	Draw	38–2–9	Charles Hadley	PTS	8	Aug 10, 1888	Theatre Comique, Minneapolis, Minnesota, US	
48	Draw	38–2–8	James Legger	PTS	10	Aug 3, 1888	Comique Theater, Minneapolis, Minnesota, US	
47	Win	38–2–7	J.P. Smith	KO	4 (?)	Jul 14, 1888	Lake City, Minnesota, US	
46	Win	37–2–7	Dick Haley	PTS	4	Jun 15, 1888	Cominique Theater, Minneapolis, Minnesota, US	
45	Win	36–2–7	J.P. Donner	PTS	10	Jun 1, 1888	Theatre Comique, Minneapolis, Minnesota, US	
44	Win	35–2–7	John Dwyer	KO	2 (?)	May 25, 1888	Theatre Comique, Minneapolis, Minnesota, US	
43	Win	34–2–7	Charles Gleason	PTS	6	May 18, 1888	Cominique Theater, Minneapolis, Minnesota, US	
42	Win	33–2–7	Ed Harris	PTS	4	Apr 8, 1888	Saint Paul, Minnesota, US	
41	Win	32–2–7	Hunter Briscoe	KO	6 (8)	Mar 2, 1888	Comique Theater, Minneapolis, Minnesota, US	
40	Win	31–2–7	Ed Moehler	PTS	8	Dec 30, 1887	Gary, Indiana, US	
39	Draw	30–2–7	Frank Taylor	PTS	10	Dec 10, 1887	Ashland, Wisconsin, US	
38	Win	30–2–6	James Legger	DQ	13 (15)	Nov 11, 1887	Theatre Comique, Minneapolis, Minneapolis, Minnesota, US	
37	Win	29–2–6	James Legger	TKO	5 (10)	Nov 1, 1887	Theatre Comique, Minneapolis, Minneapolis, Minnesota, US	
36	Win	28–2–6	Paddy Norton	KO	3 (?)	Sep 6, 1887	Lake Calhoun, Minneapolis, Minneapolis, Minnesota, US	
35	Win	27–2–6	OH Smith	PTS	4	Aug 5, 1887	Washington Roller Rink, Minneapolis, Minnesota, US	
34	Win	26–2–6	Tom Jackson	KO	5 (?)	Jul 15, 1887	Comique Theater, Minneapolis, Minnesota, US	
33	Win	25–2–6	Frank Taylor	KO	38 (?)	May 2, 1887	Woods outside of Minneapolis, Minnesota, US	Won inaugural world colored middleweight title
32	Win	24–2–6	Desperate Coon	TKO	3 (4)	Apr 22, 1887	Olympic Theater, Saint Paul, Minnesota, US	
31	Win	23–2–6	Charles Hadley	PTS	8	Apr 15, 1887	Olympic Theater, Saint Paul, Minnesota, US	
30	Draw	22–2–6	Frank Taylor	PTS	12	Apr 1, 1887	Olympic Theater, Saint Paul, Minnesota, US	
29	Win	22–2–5	Charles Hadley	PTS	8	Mar 25, 1887	Comique Theater, Minneapolis, Minnesota, US	
28	Draw	21–2–5	Frank Taylor	PTS	10	Mar 18, 1887	Comique Theater, Minneapolis, Minnesota, US	
27	Win	21–2–4	Dan Sommers	KO	4 (?)	Mar 11, 1887	Comique Theater, Minneapolis, Minnesota, US	
26	Win	20–2–4	Tom Devine	KO	5 (5)	Mar 3, 1887	Minneapolis, Minnesota, US	
25	Win	19–2–4	Will Young	KO	2 (?)	Feb 27, 1887	Minneapolis, Minnesota, US	
24	Win	18–2–4	Black Strap	KO	4 (10)	Feb 18, 1887	Comique Theater, Minneapolis, Minnesota, US	
23	Win	17–2–4	Jim O'Brien	KO	4 (?)	Feb 7, 1887	Exposition Hall, Saint Paul, Minnesota, US	
22	Draw	16–2–4	Dan Manning	PTS	10	Jan 28, 1887	Comique Theater, Minneapolis, Minnesota, US	
21	Win	16–2–3	Frank Taylor	PTS	15	Jan 21, 1887	Comique Theater, Minneapolis, Minnesota, US	
20	Win	15–2–3	Dan Sommers	KO	3 (?)	Jan 7, 1887	Minneapolis, Minnesota, US	
19	Win	14–2–3	George Gannon	KO	11 (?)	Jan 3, 1887	Cribbe Club Room, Minneapolis, Minnesota, US	
18	Loss	13–2–3	Frank Taylor	PTS	10	Dec 22, 1886	Olympic Theater, Saint Paul, Minnesota, US	
17	Win	13–1–3	Young McKay	KO	4 (8)	Dec 21, 1886	Saint Paul, Minnesota, US	
16	Win	12–1–3	Dan Sommers	TKO	7 (?)	Dec 5, 1886	Minneapolis, Minnesota, US	
15	Win	11–1–3	Black Strap	PTS	4	Dec 3, 1886	Clarks Club, Philadelphia, Pennsylvania, US	
14	Draw	10–1–3	Jim O'Brien	PTS	4	Dec 2, 1886	Exposition Rink, Saint Paul, Minnesota, US	
13	Win	10–1–2	Cass Brown	PTS	8	Nov 14, 1886	Minneapolis, Minnesota, US	
12	Win	9–1–2	Billy Young	KO	9 (?)	Sep 27, 1886	Pennsylvania, US	
11	Win	8–1–2	Jack Murphy	KO	3 (?)	Sep 7, 1886	Pennsylvania, US	
10	Win	7–1–2	Billy Young	KO	9 (?)	Sep 6, 1886	Pennsylvania, US	
9	Loss	6–1–2	Joe Butler	PTS	4	Aug 7, 1886	Clark's Club, Philadelphia, Pennsylvania, US	
8	Win	6–0–2	Tom Henderson	KO	3 (?)	Jul 3, 1886	Philadelphia, Pennsylvania, US	
7	Draw	5–0–2	Mike Highland	PTS	4	Jun 22, 1886	Clark's Club, Philadelphia, Pennsylvania, US	
6	Win	5–0–1	Charles Johnson	KO	3 (4)	Jun 16, 1886	Clark's Club, Philadelphia, Pennsylvania, US	
5	Win	4–0–1	Bill Boughbly	KO	3 (?)	Jun 11, 1886	Philadelphia, Pennsylvania, US	
4	Win	3–0–1	Bill Travers	KO	1 (4)	Jun 4, 1886	Clark's Club, Philadelphia, Pennsylvania, US	
3	Win	2–0–1	Bill Davis	KO	3 (4)	May 18, 1886	Clark's Club, Philadelphia, Pennsylvania, US	
2	Win	1–0–1	Tom Henderson	KO	5 (?)	May 8, 1886	Philadelphia, Pennsylvania, US	
1	Draw	0–0–1	Jack Burke	PTS	4	Mar 19, 1886	Cincinnati, Ohio, US	

=== Unofficial record ===
83 fights	54 wins	12 losses
By knockout	40	7
By decision	13	5
By disqualification	1	0
Draws	15	
No contests	2	

Record with the inclusion of newspaper decisions to the win/loss/draw column.

No.	Result	Record	Opponent	Type	Round	Date	Location	Notes
83	Win	54–12–15 (2)	Mr. Thomas	TKO	4 (?)	Dec 15, 1900	Clark and Langes Clubroom, Salt Lake City, Utah, US	
82	Loss	53–12–15 (2)	Young Peter Jackson	KO	2 (?)	Dec 20, 1899	Germania Hall, Seattle, Washington, US	
81	Draw	53–11–15 (2)	Jim Sellars	PTS	8	Oct 20, 1899	Sioux City A.C., Sioux City, Iowa, US	
80	Loss	53–11–14 (2)	Con Jacobus	TKO	4 (?)	Sep 18, 1899	Woodland Park, Sioux City, Iowa, US	
79	Draw	53–10–14 (2)	Jim Sellars	PTS	10	Sep 13, 1899	Opera House, Sioux City, Iowa, US	
78	Loss	53–10–13 (2)	Charley Holcombe	NWS	6	Feb 6, 1897	Nonpareil A.C., Philadelphia, Pennsylvania, US	
77	Loss	53–9–13 (2)	Andy Watson	PTS	4	Jan 16, 1897	Nonpareil A.C., Philadelphia, Pennsylvania, US	
76	Draw	53–8–13 (2)	Jack Ramsey	PTS	20	Mar 3, 1894	Fort Collins, Colorado, US	
75	Loss	53–8–12 (2)	Bobby Dobbs	KO	19 (?)	Jan 30, 1893	Armory, San Francisco, California, US	A fight to the finish
74	Loss	53–7–12 (2)	Joe King	KO	36 (?)	Oct 21, 1892	California A.C., San Francisco, California, US	
73	Win	53–6–12 (2)	Tom Harrington	KO	2 (?)	May 31, 1892	Pacific A.C., San Francisco, California, US	Exact date uncertain
72	Draw	52–6–12 (2)	Jimmy Lawler	PTS	10	Apr 18, 1892	California A.C., San Francisco, California, US	Exact date uncertain
71	Win	52–6–11 (2)	Ed Moehler	KO	2 (?)	Apr 7, 1892	San Francisco, California, US	Exact date uncertain
70	Loss	51–6–11 (2)	Hank Griffin	KO	4 (?)	Apr 1, 1892	Location unknown	Date uncertain
69	Loss	51–5–11 (2)	Charles Turner	KO	19	Feb 29, 1892	Occidental A.C., San Francisco, California, US	A fight to the finish
68	Loss	51–4–11 (2)	Ed Binney	RTD	25 (?)	Nov 30, 1891	California A.C., San Francisco, California, US	Lost world colored middleweight title
67	Win	51–3–11 (2)	Paddy Gorman	KO	4 (?)	Oct 26, 1891	Pacific A.C., San Francisco, California, US	
66	ND	50–3–11 (2)	Spike Trainor	ND	4	Sep 5, 1891	Arion Hall, Great Falls, Montana, US	
65	Win	50–3–11 (1)	George Gannon	KO	3 (?)	Aug 23, 1891	Falke's Garden, Butte, Montana, US	
64	Win	49–3–11 (1)	Joe Ellingsworth	KO	5 (?)	Jul 21, 1891	Twin City A.C., Minneapolis, Minnesota, US	
63	Win	48–3–11 (1)	Tom Murray	KO	7 (?)	May 29, 1891	Twin City A.C., Minneapolis, Minnesota, US	
62	Win	47–3–11 (1)	Mike Sullivan	KO	1 (?)	May 16, 1891	Minneapolis, Minnesota, US	
61	Loss	46–3–11 (1)	Jerry Heggerty	PTS	5	May 12, 1891	Minneapolis, Minnesota, US	
60	Win	46–2–11 (1)	Frank Lewis	TKO	5 (6)	May 7, 1891	Minneapolis, Minnesota, US	
59	ND	45–2–11 (1)	Bob Fitzsimmons	ND	4	May 1, 1891	Washington Rink, Minneapolis, Minnesota, US	
58	Draw	45–2–11	Denny Kelliher	PTS	10	Feb 10, 1891	Newmarket Theatre, Saint Paul, Minnesota, US	Retained Northwest middleweight title
57	Win	45–2–10	Jim Hightower	KO	3 (?)	Nov 20, 1890	Omaha, Nebraska, US	
56	Win	44–2–10	Denny Kelliher	PTS	20	Nov 3, 1890	Twin City A.C., Minneapolis, Missouri, US	Retained Northwest middleweight title
55	Win	43–2–10	Jim Hightower	PTS	8	Sep 9, 1890	Saint Joseph, Missouri, US	
54	Draw	42–2–10	Frank Lewis	PTS	8	Jun 27, 1890	Saint Paul, Minnesota, US	
53	Win	42–2–9	Dick Moore	TKO	4 (6)	May 23, 1890	Olympic Theater, Saint Paul, Minnesota, US	Retained Northwest middleweight title
52	Win	41–2–9	Dick Moore	KO	7 (?)	Feb 3, 1890	Minneapolis, Minnesota, US	Won vacant Northwest middleweight title
51	Win	40–2–9	Ed Moehler	KO	8 (?)	Dec 9, 1888	Comique Theater, Minneapolis, Minnesota, US	
50	Win	39–2–9	James Aster	KO	1 (?)	Oct 5, 1888	Comique Theater, Minneapolis, Minnesota, US	
49	Draw	38–2–9	Charles Hadley	PTS	8	Aug 10, 1888	Theatre Comique, Minneapolis, Minnesota, US	
48	Draw	38–2–8	James Legger	PTS	10	Aug 3, 1888	Comique Theater, Minneapolis, Minnesota, US	
47	Win	38–2–7	J.P. Smith	KO	4 (?)	Jul 14, 1888	Lake City, Minnesota, US	
46	Win	37–2–7	Dick Haley	PTS	4	Jun 15, 1888	Cominique Theater, Minneapolis, Minnesota, US	
45	Win	36–2–7	J.P. Donner	PTS	10	Jun 1, 1888	Theatre Comique, Minneapolis, Minnesota, US	
44	Win	35–2–7	John Dwyer	KO	2 (?)	May 25, 1888	Theatre Comique, Minneapolis, Minnesota, US	
43	Win	34–2–7	Charles Gleason	PTS	6	May 18, 1888	Cominique Theater, Minneapolis, Minnesota, US	
42	Win	33–2–7	Ed Harris	PTS	4	Apr 8, 1888	Saint Paul, Minnesota, US	
41	Win	32–2–7	Hunter Briscoe	KO	6 (8)	Mar 2, 1888	Comique Theater, Minneapolis, Minnesota, US	
40	Win	31–2–7	Ed Moehler	PTS	8	Dec 30, 1887	Gary, Indiana, US	
39	Draw	30–2–7	Frank Taylor	PTS	10	Dec 10, 1887	Ashland, Wisconsin, US	
38	Win	30–2–6	James Legger	DQ	13 (15)	Nov 11, 1887	Theatre Comique, Minneapolis, Minneapolis, Minnesota, US	
37	Win	29–2–6	James Legger	TKO	5 (10)	Nov 1, 1887	Theatre Comique, Minneapolis, Minneapolis, Minnesota, US	
36	Win	28–2–6	Paddy Norton	KO	3 (?)	Sep 6, 1887	Lake Calhoun, Minneapolis, Minneapolis, Minnesota, US	
35	Win	27–2–6	OH Smith	PTS	4	Aug 5, 1887	Washington Roller Rink, Minneapolis, Minnesota, US	
34	Win	26–2–6	Tom Jackson	KO	5 (?)	Jul 15, 1887	Comique Theater, Minneapolis, Minnesota, US	
33	Win	25–2–6	Frank Taylor	KO	38 (?)	May 2, 1887	Woods outside of Minneapolis, Minnesota, US	Won inaugural world colored middleweight title
32	Win	24–2–6	Desperate Coon	TKO	3 (4)	Apr 22, 1887	Olympic Theater, Saint Paul, Minnesota, US	
31	Win	23–2–6	Charles Hadley	PTS	8	Apr 15, 1887	Olympic Theater, Saint Paul, Minnesota, US	
30	Draw	22–2–6	Frank Taylor	PTS	12	Apr 1, 1887	Olympic Theater, Saint Paul, Minnesota, US	
29	Win	22–2–5	Charles Hadley	PTS	8	Mar 25, 1887	Comique Theater, Minneapolis, Minnesota, US	
28	Draw	21–2–5	Frank Taylor	PTS	10	Mar 18, 1887	Comique Theater, Minneapolis, Minnesota, US	
27	Win	21–2–4	Dan Sommers	KO	4 (?)	Mar 11, 1887	Comique Theater, Minneapolis, Minnesota, US	
26	Win	20–2–4	Tom Devine	KO	5 (5)	Mar 3, 1887	Minneapolis, Minnesota, US	
25	Win	19–2–4	Will Young	KO	2 (?)	Feb 27, 1887	Minneapolis, Minnesota, US	
24	Win	18–2–4	Black Strap	KO	4 (10)	Feb 18, 1887	Comique Theater, Minneapolis, Minnesota, US	
23	Win	17–2–4	Jim O'Brien	KO	4 (?)	Feb 7, 1887	Exposition Hall, Saint Paul, Minnesota, US	
22	Draw	16–2–4	Dan Manning	PTS	10	Jan 28, 1887	Comique Theater, Minneapolis, Minnesota, US	
21	Win	16–2–3	Frank Taylor	PTS	15	Jan 21, 1887	Comique Theater, Minneapolis, Minnesota, US	
20	Win	15–2–3	Dan Sommers	KO	3 (?)	Jan 7, 1887	Minneapolis, Minnesota, US	
19	Win	14–2–3	George Gannon	KO	11 (?)	Jan 3, 1887	Cribbe Club Room, Minneapolis, Minnesota, US	
18	Loss	13–2–3	Frank Taylor	PTS	10	Dec 22, 1886	Olympic Theater, Saint Paul, Minnesota, US	
17	Win	13–1–3	Young McKay	KO	4 (8)	Dec 21, 1886	Saint Paul, Minnesota, US	
16	Win	12–1–3	Dan Sommers	TKO	7 (?)	Dec 5, 1886	Minneapolis, Minnesota, US	
15	Win	11–1–3	Black Strap	PTS	4	Dec 3, 1886	Clarks Club, Philadelphia, Pennsylvania, US	
14	Draw	10–1–3	Jim O'Brien	PTS	4	Dec 2, 1886	Exposition Rink, Saint Paul, Minnesota, US	
13	Win	10–1–2	Cass Brown	PTS	8	Nov 14, 1886	Minneapolis, Minnesota, US	
12	Win	9–1–2	Billy Young	KO	9 (?)	Sep 27, 1886	Pennsylvania, US	
11	Win	8–1–2	Jack Murphy	KO	3 (?)	Sep 7, 1886	Pennsylvania, US	
10	Win	7–1–2	Billy Young	KO	9 (?)	Sep 6, 1886	Pennsylvania, US	
9	Loss	6–1–2	Joe Butler	PTS	4	Aug 7, 1886	Clark's Club, Philadelphia, Pennsylvania, US	
8	Win	6–0–2	Tom Henderson	KO	3 (?)	Jul 3, 1886	Philadelphia, Pennsylvania, US	
7	Draw	5–0–2	Mike Highland	PTS	4	Jun 22, 1886	Clark's Club, Philadelphia, Pennsylvania, US	
6	Win	5–0–1	Charles Johnson	KO	3 (4)	Jun 16, 1886	Clark's Club, Philadelphia, Pennsylvania, US	
5	Win	4–0–1	Bill Boughbly	KO	3 (?)	Jun 11, 1886	Philadelphia, Pennsylvania, US	
4	Win	3–0–1	Bill Travers	KO	1 (4)	Jun 4, 1886	Clark's Club, Philadelphia, Pennsylvania, US	
3	Win	2–0–1	Bill Davis	KO	3 (4)	May 18, 1886	Clark's Club, Philadelphia, Pennsylvania, US	
2	Win	1–0–1	Tom Henderson	KO	5 (?)	May 8, 1886	Philadelphia, Pennsylvania, US	
1	Draw	0–0–1	Jack Burke	PTS	4	Mar 19, 1886	Cincinnati, Ohio, US	

Awards and achievements
Preceded by New Title	World Colored Middleweight Champ; May 2, 1887 - November 30, 1891	Succeeded by Ed Binney

== See also ==
- World Negro Middleweight Championship
