= Joe Butler (boxer) =

American boxer

Joe Butler (18 May 1866 - 1 January 1941) was an African American boxer who was the colored middleweight champion of the world in the Gay Nineties. Born in Paoli, Pennsylvania, the 6′ 0½″ Butler fought out of Philadelphia during his career. Known as "The King of the Middleweights", Butler had quick hands and fast footwork and was known as canny fighter who could box or slug it out with an opponent.

== Colored Championship ==
Butler fought colored middleweight champ Ed Binney on November 13, 1892 in Philadelphia and prevailed. Binney had won the title from Harris Martin, "The Black Pearl", the self-declared world colored middleweight champion. Binney had also defeated the former "Negro Middleweight" title holder Johnny Banks, "The Darkey Wizard", in a non-title fight in 1888.

Butler lost his title in his only defense, when he was defeated by Frank Craig on 20 February 1894 in Philadelphia.

In his career, Butler won 40 fights (knocking out his opponent in 33 of the bouts), lost 23 (and was knocked out 13 times), and drew three. He also had six newspaper decisions, winning two and losing four.

Awards and achievements
Preceded by Ed Binney	World Colored Middleweight Champ; November 13, 1892 - February 20, 1894	Succeeded by Frank Craig
