= Ed Binney =

American boxer

Ed Binney (April 19, 1864 – unknown) was an African American boxer who was the colored middleweight champion of the World in the 1890s. Born Edward Phinney in Washington, D.C., the 5-foot-9-inch (175 cm) middleweight fought out of Boston and Cambridge, Massachusetts during his career. He was known a clever fighter whose punch carried a sting.

He defeated Johnny Banks ("The Darkey Wizard"), the former Negro middleweight champion of the world, in Boston in a 16-round decision. They had been scheduled to box 13 rounds, but the fight was scored a draw after the 13th. Another three rounds were tacked onto the bout and Binney won the fight.

== Colored Championship ==
Harris Martin, "The Black Pearl", declared himself the world colored middleweight champion after beating "Black Frank" Taylor in Minneapolis, Minnesota on May 2, 1887. Binney took the title from The Black Pearl on November 30, 1891, in San Francisco, California. On February 29, 1892, The Black Pearl fought Charley Turner, "The Stockton Cyclone", and was defeated. Turner claimed the title but never defended it. Binney was considered the lineal champ; he had also defeated the Negro Middleweight title holder.

Binney lost his title on November 13, 1892, in Philadelphia to Joe Butler.

In his career, Binney won 17 fights (knocking out his opponent in 15 of the bouts), lost three (and was knocked out twice), and drew six.

Awards and achievements
Preceded by Harris Martin	World Colored Middleweight Champ; November 30, 1891 – November 13, 1892	Succeeded by Joe Butler
