= World Colored Middleweight Championship =

Segregated boxing title

The World Colored Middleweight Championship was a title awarded to black boxers in the late nineteenth and early twentieth centuries. This was the only recognized middleweight championship available to blacks prior to Tiger Flowers (5 August 1895 - 16 November 1927) winning the world middleweight boxing championship by defeating Harry Greb on 26 February 1926.

Two world colored middleweight champions, George Byer and Sam Langford, went on to win the World Colored Heavyweight Championship.

== Negro Middleweight Champion ==
Johnny Banks, "The Darkey Wizard", claimed the Negro Middleweight Championship of the World during the 1880s. He lost in a title fight on 26 January 1887 in New York City to James Desverney when he was disqualified in the ninth round on a foul. (Desverney apparently never defended the title.) Banks's next fight was with future colored middleweight champ Ed Binney in Boston, in which they drew in the scheduled 13 rounds. Another three rounds were tacked onto the bout and Binney won the fight.

== Colored Champions ==
Harris Martin, "The Black Pearl", declared himself the world colored middleweight champion after beating "Black Frank" Taylor in Minneapolis, Minnesota, on 2 May 1887, when he knocked out Taylor in the 38th or 40th round of their bout. Martin lost his title to Ed Binney on 30 November 1891 in San Francisco, California.

On 29 February 1892, The Black Pearl fought Charley Turner, "The Stockton Cyclone", in his first fight since losing the title to Binney and was defeated. Turner claimed the title but never defended it. Binney was considered the lineal champ; he had also defeated the holder of the Negro Middleweight title.

=== 20th Century ===
From 1912 to 1924, there was a continuous line of colored middleweight champs. The last title holder of this era was Larry Estridge, who defeated previous title holder Panama Joe Gans in a fight at Yankee Stadium on July 26, 1924. He defended the title against Gans at Queensboro Stadium in Long Island City, Queens, New York on August 11 of that year. It was his sole title defense.

Gans had won the title from George Robinson in Madison Square Garden on October 8, 1920. He defended the title twice in 1923, racking up no decisions (and thus keeping his title) against Whitey Black on May 14 in Detroit and against Tiger Flowers in Toledo, Ohio on May 25. He knocked out Willie Walker via a 9th round K.O. in New York City on June 30.

After Tiger Flowers lost the title in 1926, there was one more African American middleweight champ, Gorilla Jones, who reigned for six months in 1932. There would not be another black middleweight champ until Sugar Ray Robinson in 1950.

=== Revived Title ===
The colored middleweight title was revived in the early 1940s. Charley Burley, who had been the colored welterweight champ, fought Holman Williams for the championship on 14 August 14, 1942, and won on a 9th round TKO. Williams won the title on a decision in their rematch on 16 October 1942, then lost the title on 15 January 1943 to the Cocoa Kid in a 12-round decision. The Kid never defended the title.

== List of champions ==
#	Name	Reign	Date	Days held	Location	Defenses	Notes
1	Harris Martin	1	May 2, 1887	1673	Minneapolis, Minnesota; USA	1	"The Black Pearl" declared himself the world colored middleweight champion after fighting "Black Frank" Taylor to a draw.
2	Ed Binney	1	November 30, 1891	349	San Francisco, California; USA	1	Charley Turner claimed the title after defeating Harris Martin on 29 February 1892 in San Francisco but never defended it.
3	Joe Butler	1	November 13, 1892	464	Philadelphia, Pennsylvania; USA	2	Defeated Frank Craig in title defense on 18 March 1893 in Philadelphia.
4	Frank Craig	1	February 20, 1894	Unknown	Philadelphia, Pennsylvania; USA	0	Vacated title without defending it.
5	George Byers	1	December 9, 1897	Unknown	Waterbury, Connecticut; USA	Unknown	Byer defeated Harry Peppers, the Pacific Coast middleweight champion; won the World Colored Heavyweight Championship in 1898.
6	Sam Langford	1	November 12, 1907	Unknown	Los Angeles, California; USA	Unknown	Defeated Young Peter Jackson; won World Colored Heavyweight Championship in 1909.
7	Eddie Palmer (boxer)	1	September 26, 1912	1331	New York City; USA	4	Claimed title after scoring no-decision in bout with "Young" Tommy Coleman.
8	Jamaica Kid	1	May 19, 1916	Unknown	New Orleans, Louisiana; USA	0	Did not defend title.
9	Panama Joe Gans	1	October 8, 1920	1387	New York City; USA	5	Defeated George Madison at Madison Square Garden; lost title to Larry Estridge at Yankee Stadium.
10	Larry Estridge	1	July 26, 1924	Unknown	The Bronx, New York; USA	1	Title became extinct after Tiger Flowers won the World Middleweight title on February 26, 1926.
11	Harry Smith	1	November 16, 1929	Unknown	Kingston, Jamaica; Harlem, New York, US	1	Title revived; Smith beat Jack McVey with 15 round PTS.
11	Charley Burley	1	August 14, 1942	63	New Orleans, Louisiana; USA	1	Title revived; Burley beat Holman Williams with 9th round TKO.
12	Holman Williams	1	October 16, 1942	91	New Orleans, Louisiana; USA	1	Williams beat Burley via points in 15 round decision.
13	Cocoa Kid	1	January 15, 1943	Unknown	New Orleans, Louisiana; USA	Unknown	Cocoa Kid beat Williams via points in 12-round bout.

== See also ==
- World Colored Heavyweight Championship
- World Colored Light Heavyweight Championship
- World Colored Welterweight Championship
- Black Heavyweight Championship
- World Negro Middleweight Championship
