= Kid Parker =

American boxer

William Elroy Parker
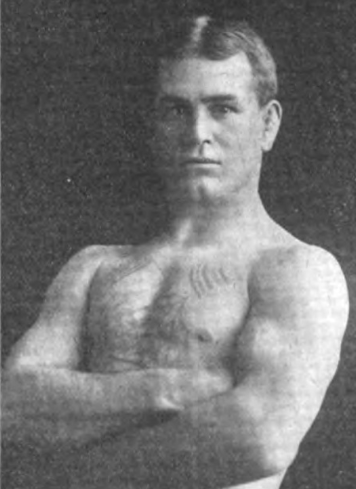

Personal information
- Nicknames: Denver Kid Parker; Vegetarian pugilist
- Born: January 20, 1877 Boston, Massachusetts, U.S.
- Height: 5 ft 6 in (168 cm)
- Weight: Lightweight; Welterweight

Boxing career
- Stance: Orthodox

Boxing record
- Total fights: 49
- Wins: 30
- Win by KO: 26
- Losses: 11
- Draws: 9

William Elroy Parker (born January 20, 1877), better known as Kid Parker, was an American professional boxer, physical culturist and promoter of vegetarianism. He was the first vegetarian boxer.

== Biography ==
Parker was born on January 20, 1877, in Boston. Parker was considered the best boxer in Denver. He had an 18-match undefeated streak. In 1900, he fought a ten-round draw with Matty Matthews. Parker became a vegetarian in 1901. He stated that a strict vegetarian diet increased his physical endurance and increased his mental power. He was the first vegetarian boxer.

In April 1902, The Vegetarian Magazine published a letter describing Parker's conversion to vegetarianism. He became known as the "vegetarian champion" and "vegetarian pugilist". Parker's vegetarian diet consisted of cereals, fruit, milk, nuts, vegetables and a liberal amount of eggs. In April, 1903 Parker authored an article on physical culture in the San Francisco Call, advocating a vegetarian diet for health reasons. He declared he would still be boxing at 35 and live to be 100 years old because he is vegetarian. In 1905, Parker was described as "one of the most gentlemanly fighters in the prize ring today". Parker's wife was also a boxer.

Parker's last ring appearance was in 1906. After his boxing career ended Parker was institutionalized in an asylum at Norfolk, Nebraska as he suffered from hallucinations. Parker would repeatedly punch the wall in his padded cell so was given boxing gloves to protect his hands.

== Selected publications ==
- The Conversion of a Noted Pugilist (1902)
- Exercises for Women (1903)
