= Eileen Creedon =

Irish judge

The Hon. Ms Justice Eileen Creedon

Judge of the High Court
- Incumbent
- Assumed office 21 June 2017
- Nominated by: Government of Ireland
- Appointed by: Michael D. Higgins

Personal details
- Born: 12 February 1957 (age 69) Cork, Ireland
- Education: University College Cork; Law Society of Ireland

Eileen Creedon (born 12 February 1957) is an Irish judge who has served as a Judge of the High Court since June 2017. She was Chief State Solicitor of Ireland from 2012 until her appointment to the Bench in 2017.

== Education ==
Creedon qualified as a solicitor in 1987, and was educated at University College Cork and the Incorporated Law Society of Ireland.

== Career ==
After qualifying, Creedon served her apprenticeship with Michael Powell & Co Solicitors, before spending eight years in private practice with JW O’Donovan & Co Solicitors where she concentrated on commercial conveyancing and litigation.

Creedon joined the Chief State Solicitor's Office in 1995, which is a constituent element of the Office of the Attorney General of Ireland.

Creedon was Head of the Special Criminal Court Section and the Criminal Trials Section of the Chief State's Solicitor's Office. In 2001, she moved to the Directing Division of the DPP's Office.

She was Chief Prosecution Solicitor (and previously Deputy) in the Office of the Irish Director of Public Prosecutions from 2007 until 2012.
