= Michael Creedon (Gaelic footballer) =

Irish Gaelic footballer

Personal information
- Native name: Mícheál Ó Críodáin (Irish)
- Born: 1960 (age 65–66) Ballyvourney, County Cork, Ireland

Sport
- Sport: Gaelic Football
- Position: Goalkeeper
Club
- Years: Club
- Naomh Abán
Club titles
- Cork titles: 0
Inter-county*
Years	County	Apps (scores)
1981-1984	Cork	8 (0-00)
Inter-county titles
- Munster titles: 1
- All-Irelands: 0
- NFL: 0
- *Inter County team apps and scores correct as of 14:09, 3 January 2013.

Michael Creedon (born 1960) is an Irish retired Gaelic footballer who played as a goalkeeper for the Cork senior team.

Creedon joined the panel during the 1981 championship and was a regular member of the starting fifteen for three seasons until his retirement after the 1984 championship. During that time he won one Munster medal.

At club level Creedon played with Naomh Abán.
