= Johnny Banks =

American boxer

Johnny Banks (born December 25, 1861, in Richmond, Virginia), was an African American boxer who fought under the sobriquet "The Darkey Wizard" and was the Negro Middleweight Champion of the World during the mid-1880s.

Standing 5'6" tall (some sources claim he was 5'5.5" tall), Banks fought out of New York City at a weight of 128-160 lbs. from 1883 to 1899. In his career, he racked up an official record of 11 wins (three by K.O.) against eight losses (being K.O.ed three times) and 17 draws. Most of his fights went unrecorded.

Boxing historian Nat Fleischer claimed that he fought as many as five times a week in Philadelphia and he averaged a fight per week for five years. Fleischer claimed that Banks won over 90% of his bouts. Reportedly, Banks contorted his mouth as he fought and snorted, grunted, and yelled while in the ring. He was a very smart boxer with a good right.

He claimed the Negro Middleweight title but lost it to James Desverney on January 26, 1887, in a fight in New York City when he was disqualified in the ninth round.

Titles in pretence
Preceded by New title	Negro Middleweight Champion of the World; Unknown - January 26, 1887	Succeeded by James Desverney; Title became defunct
