= Charley Turner =

American boxer

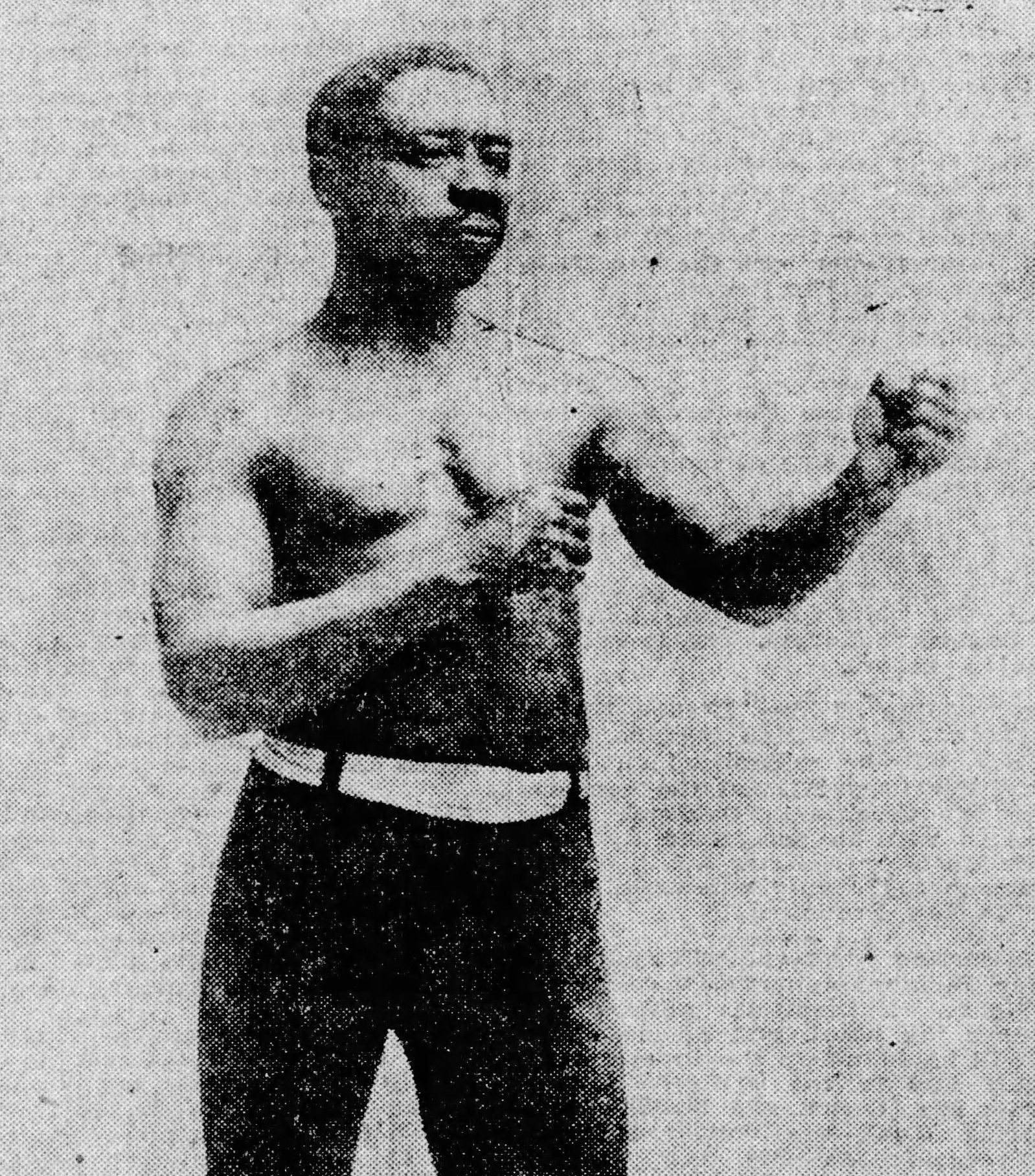
- Turner in undated photo

Personal information
- Nickname: The Stockton Cyclone
- Nationality: American
- Born: January 1, 1862
- Died: August 13, 1913 (aged 51)
- Weight: Middleweight

Boxing career

Charley Turner (1 January 1862 – 13 August 1913) was an African American boxer who claimed to be the colored middleweight champion of the World in the Gay Nineties. Born in Stockton, California in 1862, Turner was known as "the Stockton Cyclone". He fought out of Stockton at a weight of between 148 and 156 lbs. during his career, which would classify him as a middleweight by modern reckoning as well as by the standards of the time.

Boxing historian Nat Fleischer claimed that Turner, whom he called a "great two-fisted fighter, as fearless as they come", won 90% percent of the bouts in which he fought. The Stockton Cyclone frequently took on boxers who outweighed him by as much as 20 lbs. His brother Rufe Turner also was a boxer.

== Disputed Middleweight Championship ==
Harris Martin, "The Black Pearl", declared himself the world colored middleweight champion after beating "Black Frank" Taylor in Minneapolis, Minnesota on 2 May 1887. Ed Binney took the title from The Black Pearl on 30 November 1891 in San Francisco. In February 1892, a bout was scheduled between The Black Pearl and The Stockton Cyclone but had to be postponed due to an abscess on Turner's jaw.

The fight was finally held on February 29 during that leap year of 1892. The bout was held at the Occidental Club in San Francisco for a purse of $1,000 (equivalent to approximately $35,833 in today's funds). Turner prevailed via a K.O. in the 19th round.

Turner claimed the colored middleweight title (which actually was not The Black Pearl's to lose) but never defended it. Binney was considered the lineal champ; he lost his title on November 13, 1892 in Philadelphia to Joe Butler.

== Arrest ==
In May 1893, Turner was arrested in Sacramento, California for robbing Alfred Rodgers of his gold watch and chain. The bail was set at $1,000. Convicted of the theft on June 30, Turner was imprisoned for a year in Folsom State Prison and did not officially fight during the calendar year 1894.

== Record ==
The Stockton Cyclone fought again from 1895 through 1904, after which he retired. In his career, Turner officially won 11 fights (knocking out his opponent in nine of the bouts), lost seven (and was knocked out six times), and drew six.

== Death ==
In June 1913, The News Tribune reported that Turner was dying from tuberculosis. He died at his mother's home in Stockton, California on August 13, 1913. His obituary described Turner as a "legitimate middleweight and could easily do 150 pounds. He was fast, clever, had short, snappy straight punches and carried a knockout in either glove. He was regarded as a wonderful ring general, besides being thoroughly game".

Titles in pretence
Preceded by Harris Martin	World Colored Middleweight Champion; February 29, 1893 - Unknown	Succeeded by Ed Binney
