= Dan Creedon =

New Zealand boxer

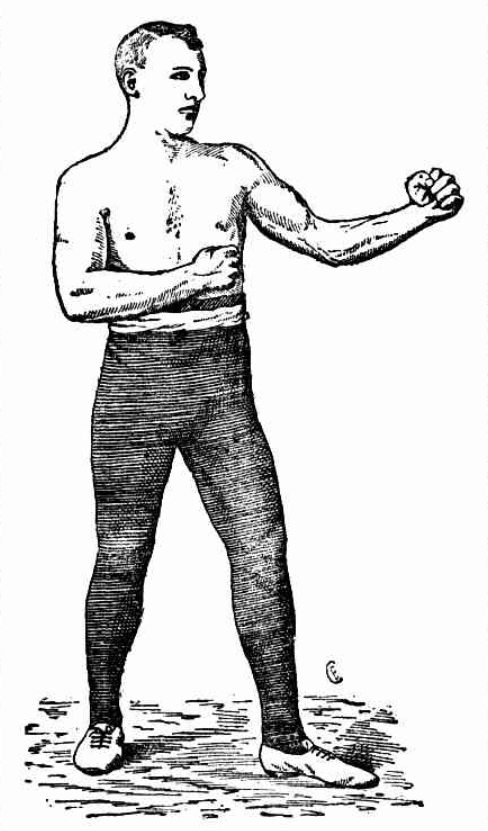

Personal information
- Nationality: New Zealand
- Born: 9 June 1868 Invercargill, New Zealand
- Died: 10 July 1942 (aged 73)
- Height: 5 ft 8 in (1.73 m)
- Weight: Middleweight

Boxing career
- Reach: 69 in (175 cm)
- Stance: Orthodox

Boxing record
- Total fights: 77
- Wins: 39
- Win by KO: 32
- Losses: 21
- Draws: 10
- No contests: 7

Dan Creedon (9 June 1868 – 10 July 1942) was a middleweight boxer who challenged for the world middleweight title twice and claimed the title between 1895 and 1897.

Creedon was born in Invercargill, New Zealand but his boxing career developed in Melbourne, Australia. Like many of Australia's best boxers of this era, Creedon was taught by boxing pioneers Jem Mace and Larry Foley. He held the Australian middleweight title from 1891 until his departure for America in 1892. He challenged Bob Fitzsimmons for the world middleweight title in 1894, in what would be Fitzsimmons' last defense of his belt before becoming a heavyweight. Creedon was knocked out in just 2 rounds. However, a year later he claimed the world title following his victory over Frank Craig in London. Creedon defended his claim to the title at least twice, but he is not commonly recognized as a middleweight champion by boxing historians. He would eventually lose to Kid McCoy, after which his career took a downward spiral.

Creedon returned to Australia in 1902 and would fight a handful of fights, most of which he lost, before eventually retiring. A benefit was held for him on 26 November 1924, in the Socialist Hall of Melbourne, as he was "in ill health". Creedon was inducted to the Australian National Boxing Hall of Fame in 2011.
