= Patrick McGuigan =

American boxer (1868–1938)

Paddy McGuigan

Personal information
- Nicknames: Paddy; Mac; Pride of New Jersey; Blacksmith Lightweight
- Nationality: American
- Born: Patrick McGuigan; March 17, 1868 Kentucky
- Died: September 13, 1938 (aged 70) Harrison, New Jersey
- Height: 5 ft 7 in (170 cm)
- Weight: Lightweight

Boxing career

Boxing record
- Total fights: 50+
- Wins: 19
- Win by KO: 5
- Losses: 2
- Draws: 6

Patrick McGuigan (March 17, 1868 – September 13, 1938) was an American boxer, promoter, entertainer, business man, and sports figure in the late nineteenth and early twentieth centuries. A member of the New Jersey Boxing Hall of Fame, he is considered one of the best fighters of the era and was a beloved figure among sports fans in the region, considered by many to be "The Pride of New Jersey." He became the New Jersey Lightweight Champion in 1890 and the Interstate New York & New Jersey Lightweight Champion in 1892. Fighting in both the bare-knuckle and gloved eras, he met virtually all of the world's top boxers in his class. At the peak of his career he traveled the country with William Muldoon's athletic carnival, "meeting all comers" in each city they visited. Once he retired from boxing professionally, he became a promoter and opened a fight club and a saloon in Harrison, NJ. He has been credited as one of the men responsible for boxing's rise to affluence in New Jersey after it was legalized in 1918 under the Hurley Law, being the first individual in the state to secure a license to legally host boxing matches. Paddy "must be chronicled as one of the greatest ringmen who ever lived," according to sportswriter Anthony Marenghi, and has been described by Hall of Fame manager Tom O'Rourke as the greatest fighter he had ever seen.

== Early life ==
Paddy was born in Kentucky in 1868 to Michael McGuigan and Bridget McClachey, both Irish immigrants. Around the age of six, Paddy moved to Newark, NJ with his parents and two older brothers, John and James. Paddy became separated from his parents around the age of ten or twelve, though the reason is unknown, and later began working in local strawberry fields. He and his brothers lived together until their deaths in 1905 and 1913 and they moved often, living in Paterson, Newark, and Harrison, the latter being where Paddy settled and began to raise his family. Paddy's father Michael lived on his own until his death and his mother Bridget died of tuberculosis.

== Professional career ==
Paddy is regarded as one of the toughest fighters of his time, having fought many top boxers, including George Dixon, Joe Walcott, Jack McAuliffe, Johnny Banks, and Kid Lavigne. He fought out of Newark, Hoboken, and Harrison, NJ. In the period in which he fought, often referred to as the Jim Corbett era, records were scarcely kept and official decisions were often not made due to the illegality of prizefighting in most places. Consequently, some of McGuigan's bouts were held in meadows, barns, or barges in the Newark Bay in order to stall law enforcement and confound local officials with questions of jurisdiction. For a period of time at the height of his career, McGuigan was part of a boxing stable managed by William Muldoon and Tom O'Rourke and traveled the United States with Muldoon's athletic carnival, "meeting all comers" wherever they stopped.

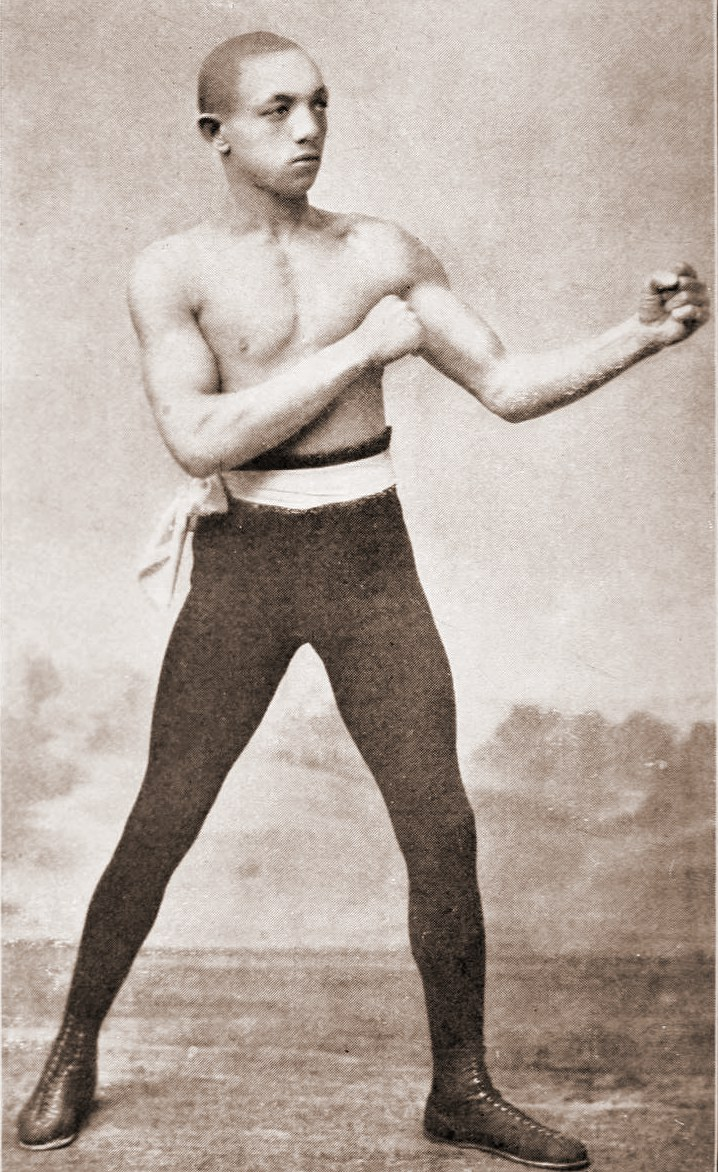
World Bantamweight Champion George Dixon.

=== George Dixon fight ===
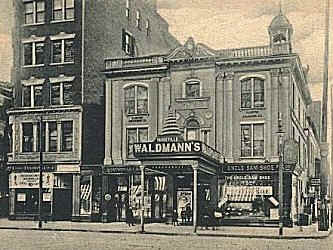
Waldmann's Theatre in Newark, NJ.

Shortly after McGuigan quit the troupe around 1888, George "Little Chocolate" Dixon, who was managed by O'Rourke, won the world bantamweight title and became the first black world champion at any class. As was common, O'Rourke then began an exhibition tour around the country for Dixon to "take on all comers." O'Rourke scheduled his tour to stop at Waldmann's Theatre in Newark which was perhaps, as the Newark Star-Ledger described, an oversight since O'Rourke knew of McGuigan's ability fully well and should have known he resided in the area. McGuigan found his way onto the stage and what ensued was one of fiercest bouts Dixon had ever fought and a match that would become shrouded in controversy. McGuigan was seen leading through the first three rounds and had Dixon knocked to the floor in the fourth when O'Rourke suddenly dropped the curtain to save Dixon from further humiliation, a knockout, or both. An angered McGuigan demanded that Dixon resume fighting, but he refused. Later, in 1891, Dixon won the featherweight title and McGuigan challenged him to a title match, but Dixon declined and refused to acknowledge McGuigan as a rival for the championship.

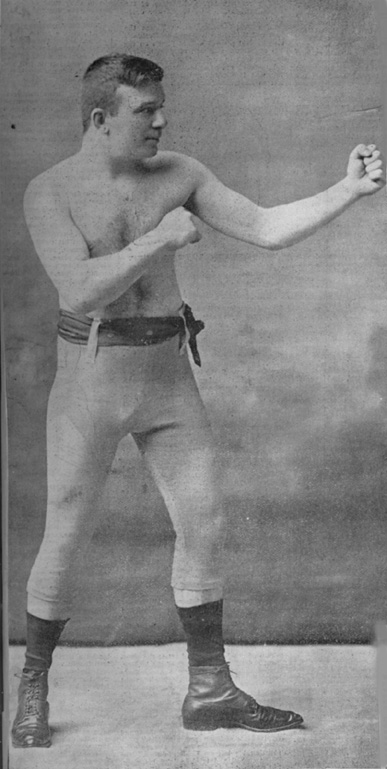
World Featherweight Champion Young Griffo.

=== Jack McAuliffe exhibition ===
World Lightweight Champion Jack McAuliffe.

At one point during the height of his career, McGuigan had been chasing Young Griffo around the country in the hopes of meeting him in the ring, however Griffo refused to fight him. Griffo shortly after went on to fight a 25-round draw with George Dixon, before McGuigan fought Dixon at Waldmann's Theatre in Newark. Jack McAuliffe, the reigning undefeated lightweight champion of the world at the time, had heard stories about how Griffo had been avoiding a match with McGuigan, as well as how hard McGuigan pressed Dixon, and sought out to prove that he wasn't afraid to fight Paddy himself, agreeing to meet him in two consecutive nights in Newark while on a tour. McGuigan described the event himself during an interview by sports journalist G.A. Falzer of the Newark Sunday Call, "I punched the great McAuliffe all around the ring. The fight went six rounds, maybe it was four. Anyway, when we were to clash the second time on the following night, the champion shooed me away and elected to go on with a sparring partner named Jimmy Nelson."

=== Interstate lightweight championship ===
McGuigan won the interstate lightweight championship by defeating New York champion Jack Aikens in a scheduled ten round bout on November 21, 1892, at the Vendome Club in Newark, NJ. McGuigan was the reigning lightweight champion of New Jersey and was said to have "met all comers in Hoboken and Newark repeatedly", while Aikens was reported to have knocked out almost every man he faced within two rounds. In front of a crowd of 3,000 spectators, McGuigan was awarded a point victory in the eighth round. McGuigan weighed 124 lbs while Aiken weighed 135 lbs.

=== Joe Walcott fight ===
Joe Walcott.

Considered perhaps his most memorable fight, McGuigan battled Joe Walcott, widely considered one of the greatest welterweights and pound-for-pound boxers of all time, on June 5, 1893, at Caledonian Park Hall in Newark, NJ. The bout was one of a number of exhibitions held that night and the event was the first ever to feature a brass band, an innovation at the time, to entertain spectators between bouts. Notable fighters in attendance included Bob Fitzsimmons, George Dixon, and Jack McAuliffe. McGuigan and Walcott's fight lasted the full ten rounds and was reported at the time as one of the most grueling and savage fights in history. There was a considerable amount of anticipation beforehand, as both McGuigan, long considered "the pride of New Jersey," and Walcott, called "Boston's colored favorite," were known to fight from start to finish and were in top physical condition. Before the fight, McGuigan claimed that Walcott weighed 136 lbs while he only weighed 126, and The New York Times reported that Walcott looked more as if he weighed close to 146 lbs, however Walcott's official weigh-in was said to be at 132 lbs. The Times reported that the beginning of the match was "warmly contested," but McGuigan was "outclassed" and struggled in the last three rounds. He reportedly appeared groggy towards the end of the bout, which surprised his supporters, however that was later understood when a doctor stated that one or two of McGuigan's ribs had been broken in the seventh round. The Times wrote, "How he stood for three hot rounds before his dusky opponent, who is known as a heavy hitter, is a mystery." The referee awarded the fight to Walcott, however both men declared victory. Subsequently, multiple sources indicated varying results including that no decision was ever made, a Walcott victory, and a draw with a shade in Walcott's favor. McGuigan earned a great deal of praise for going toe-to-toe with an all-time great champion, all while suffering through broken ribs and fighting to the end nonetheless.

=== Train crash ===
On August 25, 1894, McGuigan was returning home from the Young Griffo–Jack McAuliffe fight on Coney Island when suddenly his trolly car became separated from its wire and stopped on the tracks. The car behind them crashed into the rear of the car where McGuigan was sitting and injured him severely, keeping him bedridden for weeks. He subsequently hired the firm of McCarter, Williamson & McCarter and sued the Consolidated Traction Company for $20,000. His case was heard by the New Jersey Supreme Court in November of that year. The result of the case has yet to be discovered.

Surviving Records
Res.	Opponent	Type	Rd	Date	Location	Notes
Win	Name Unknown	UNK	4	1886	Trenton, NJ	
Win	Young Fagin	UNK	3	28 June 1886	East Newark, NJ	
Win	Paddy Carney	UNK	UNK	1886–87	Unknown Location	
Win	Terrance Fagan	TKO	3	1887	Unknown Location	
Win	P. Caulfield	UNK	UNK	21 May 1888	Belleville, NJ	
Win	Joe Herold	KO	5	16 October 1888	Belleville, NJ	
Win	Harry Bartlett	KO	7	29 March 1889	Long Island, NY	Bout was originally scheduled for March 27 in Paterson, NJ, but Bartlett's supporters backed out.
Exhibition	Cal McCarthy	EX	3	22 October 1889	Hoboken, NJ	
Reported	Joe Fielding	UNK	UNK	1890	UNK	Fielding wrote in a letter to the Florida Star newspaper that this was a "great battle."
Scheduled	Jack Darcy	UNK	10	7 January 1890	Knickerbocker Hall, Hoboken, NJ	Match scheduled, outcome unknown.
Exhibition	John Banks	EX	UNK	25 February 1890	Brooklyn, NY	
Draw	Jack Martin	Pts	20	28 June 1890	Boyle's Knickerbocker Garden, Hoboken, NJ	Referee announced a draw amongst crowd's jeers. McGuigan wanted to continue but Martin refused, leading McGuigan to call him a "coward" and refused to shake hands with him. McGuigan offered him $50 to "stand before him for two more 3-minute rounds," but Martin still refused.
Exhibition	Johnny Banks	UNK	UNK	30 June 1890	Weare's Hall, West Hoboken, NJ	
Win	Joe Sonntag	Pts	6	29 July 1890	Weare's Hall, West Hoboken, NJ	
Win	Jack Nagle	KO	3	5 September 1890	Jersey City, NJ	May have fought a Henry or Frank Nagle. Some sources state TKO in 2nd. According to the New York Herald, McGuigan was undefeated up to this fight.
Draw	Alex Gallagher	Pts	20	23 December 1890	Boyle's Garden, Hoboken, NJ	Famous jockey, Snapper Garrison, was referee. McGuigan wanted to continue fighting past the 20th round, but Gallagher refused, stating the purse was not large enough.
Scheduled	Jack Hopper	UNK	UNK	7 February 1891	Brooklyn, NY	Match scheduled, outcome unknown.
Win	Paddy Carney	UNK	UNK	1891	Unknown Location	
Win	George Butler	UNK	UNK	1891	Unknown Location	
Win	Jack Martin	UNK	UNK	1891	Unknown Location	Rematch.
Win	Jim Williams	UNK	UNK	1891	Unknown Location	
Win	Jack Correy	UNK	UNK	1891	Unknown Location	
Win	Austin Mitchell	KO	2	4 November 1892	Hoboken, NJ	
Win	Paddy McBride	UNK	UNK	Prior to 21 Nov 1892	Unknown Location	
Win	Frank Cavanagh	UNK	UNK	Prior to 21 Nov 1892	Unknown Location	
Exhibition	Jack McAuliffe	UNK	4	Prior to 21 Nov 1892	Unknown Location	Took place in Newark while McAuliffe was on tour.
Reported	Austin Gibbons	UNK	UNK	Prior to 21 Nov 1892	Unknown Location	Match reported to have taken place, outcome unknown.
Win	Jack Aikens	Pts	8	21 November 1892	Vendome Club, Newark, NJ	Won the Interstate Lightweight Championship.
Controversial	George Dixon	UNK	4	Prior to June 1893	Waldmann's Theatre, Newark, NJ	Curtain was suddenly dropped in fourth round after favorable start for McGuigan. McGuigan later challenged Dixon for a shot at the Featherweight Title, but Dixon refused.
Both Claimed Victory	Joe Walcott	Pts	10	5 June 1893	Caledonian Park Hall, Newark, NJ	Both men claimed victory. McGuigan suffered a broken rib in the 7th round yet continued fighting.
Scheduled	Tommy Duff	UNK	6	2 March 1894	Lafayette, NJ	Match scheduled, outcome unknown.
Scheduled	George Siddons	UNK	UNK	14 June 1894	Harrison, NJ	Match scheduled, outcome unknown.
Exhibition	John Banks	Pts	3	29 February 1896	Madison Square Garden, New York	
Exhibition	John Banks	EX	3	11 March 1896	New York, NY	
Draw	John Banks	Pts	4	28 March 1896	Greenwood Olympia, Brooklyn, NY	May have fought a fighter named Johnny Barlas.
Draw	John Banks	Pts	3	20 July 1896	Madison Square Garden, New York	
Loss	John Banks	Pts	6	25 July 1896	Brooklyn, NY	
Scheduled	John Banks	UNK	UNK	1 August 1896	Brooklyn, NY	Match scheduled, outcome unknown.
Exhibition	John Banks	Pts	4	31 August 1896	Madison Square Garden, New York	Paddy and Banks gave an "amusing" exhibition during the same event as the Tom Sharkey–John Sullivan exhibition.
Exhibition	John Banks	ND	4	16 November 1896	New York, NY	This was a burlesque boxing match to entertain spectators at the same event of the Pete Maher–Joe Choynski fight.
Exhibition	John Banks	ND	4	27 March 1897	New York, NY	This was a fake contest, where Banks would shout each time McGuigan would go at him.
Draw	John Banks	Pts	3	18 June 1897	Greenwood A.C., New York, NY	
Reported	George "Kid" Lavigne	UNK	UNK	Unknown Date	Unknown Location	Match reported to have taken place, outcome unknown.
Reported	Jimmy Handler	UNK	UNK	Unknown Date	Unknown Location	Match reported to have taken place, outcome unknown.
Reported	Tom Gaffney	UNK	UNK	Unknown Date	Unknown Location	Match reported to have taken place, outcome unknown.
Reported	Tommy Danforth	UNK	UNK	Unknown Date	Unknown Location	Match reported to have taken place, outcome unknown.
Exhibition	Tim McDermott	UNK	4	27 January 1900	St. Bridget's Hall, Jersey City, NJ	
Win	Charles Sieger "The Hoboken Iron Man"	Pts	4	1906	College Point, Queens, NY	
Loss	Joe Fielding	UNK	2	circa 1908	Unknown Location	Fielding claimed he "stopped" McGuigan in 2 rounds while acknowledging a "great battle" with him 18 years prior.
Exhibition	John Banks	EX	3	22 December 1920	4th Regiment Armory, Jersey City, NJ	This was a benefit event. Paddy donated $102 and boxed 3 rounds with old friend Johnny Banks who was 59. Paddy was 52.

== Acting career ==
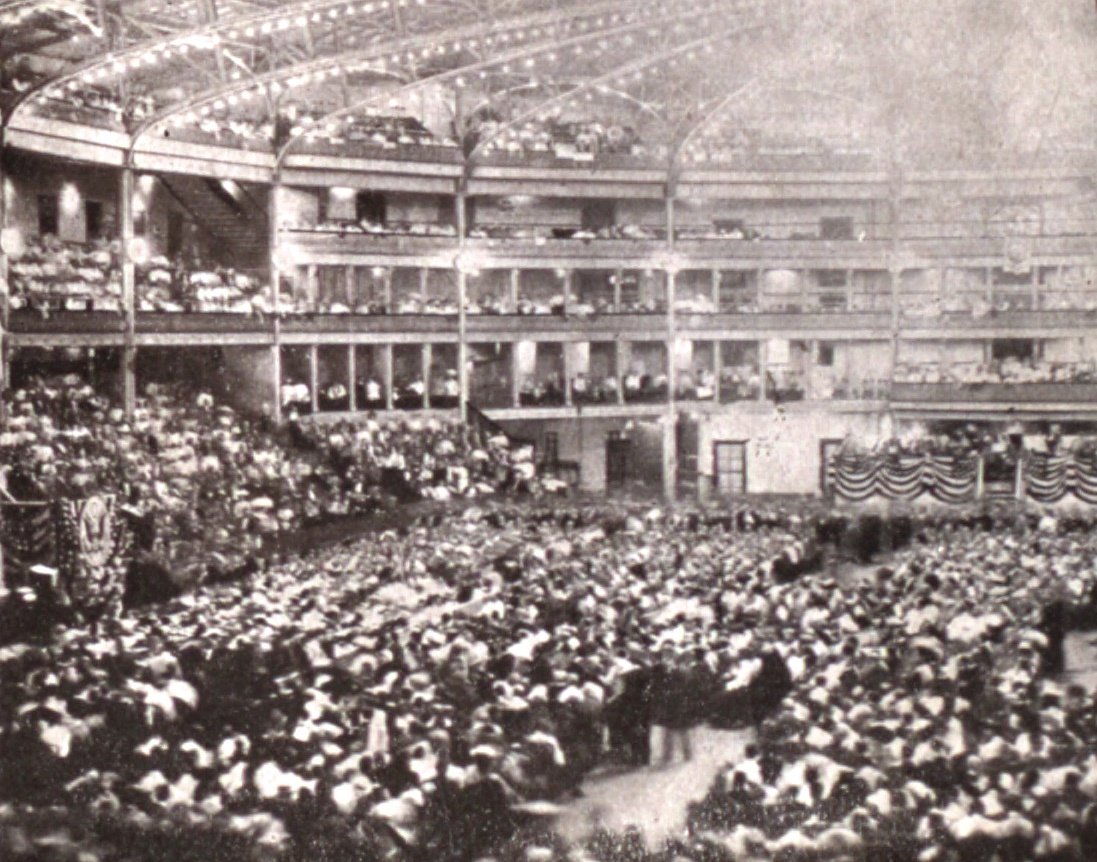
Inside Madison Square Garden in 1890.

McGuigan briefly turned from boxing to the stage in 1896, taking Jim Corbett's place in W.A. Brady's traveling play "After Dark" when Corbett took a hiatus to begin training for the famed Bob Fitzsimmons championship fight in Carson City, NV which took place on March 17, 1897. That bout was filmed by Enoch J. Rector, who released The Corbett-Fitzsimmons Fight documentary on May 22, 1897, the world's first feature film. Purchased by Brady from original writer and owner Dion Boucicault, the play featured a transitional scene in which McGuigan plays the role of a boxer sparring with another fellow pugilist, played by John Banks, in a four-round bout. The overall play received mixed reviews from a variety of papers, however the sparring scene was viewed with a tremendous amount of enthusiasm, especially when featuring Jim Corbett, who was world heavyweight champion at the time. After a rendition in New York City in which McGuigan performed, a reviewer from The New York Times wrote, "The very earnest contest of muscle and science, with the gloves, between Mr. Paddy McGuigan, a lean and lithe young Irish-American, and Mr. Johnny Banks, whose remote forebears were doubtless stalwart warriors in Guinea, was quite the best thing in the show..."

World Colored Middleweight Champion John Banks.

McGuigan and Banks were also known for their amusing fake exhibitions and burlesque boxing matches during this same time period, which may have been related to their "After Dark" performances. They performed together many times, three of those occasions taking place at Madison Square Garden in 1896.

== Promoter ==
McGuigan began promoting fights after the conclusion of his boxing career, which may have reached well into his 50s. For the many years that boxing was outlawed in New Jersey, McGuigan conducted fights in a hall underneath his house in Harrison and the ropes of his first ring were supported by four kegs. After the Hurley Boxing Law was passed in 1918 that legalized boxing as long as certain conditions were met, McGuigan posted a required $10,000 bond, $160,000 in 2011 adjusting for inflation, in order to obtain a license to conduct fights, being among the first to do so. By this time, McGuigan had already incorporated the McGuigan Harrison Athletic Club, with an adjoining saloon, at 56 Harrison Avenue. His club then soon began to prosper, hosting fights between regional and national boxers, as well as dances and other events. The club, also garnering the names Old Paddy McGuigan's "Bucket of Blood" and "Tub of Gore," was widely popular for at least 18 years and was the only fight club in Hudson County at one time. Seating capacity at the club was limited and the ring itself was very small, leading one journalist to comment, "Once a man crawled between those ropes, he had to fight; there was no room to run away."

McGuigan was a unique promoter because he was also a fighter. In his club's heyday, he served as matchmaker, referee, and announcer, often giving some colorful speeches during events. Arch Ward of the Chicago Tribune wrote on March 16, 1938, "Paddy McGuigan, old time boxer, who goes back to the bare-knuckle days, conducts a fight in Harrison, NJ... His speeches from the ring, delivered with a cud of tobacco in his cheek, are so funny they attract more customers than his bouts... He is 70 years old." When a fighter would feign injury or attempt to gain an advantage via a technicality, McGuigan would offer to fight them himself or otherwise heave them out of the ring personally. He was in such remarkable physical shape even in this older age that he could actually knock around many younger boxers of the time. Once, after a top bantamweight fighter mocked him as being an old man, McGuigan reportedly began throwing punches at him until the younger fighter called it quits. He did not believe in written contracts with fighters and would often gather them around a pot stove in the front of the club and pair them off. At the club, which had earned a reputation as the "home of the good fights," if a fighter won with a knockout within the first two rounds, McGuigan would throw another opponent at him.

McGuigan was arrested and released on $500 bail after a young boxer named Angelo Venizona died from a blow to the head at his club the night before. William Kennedy, Venizona's opponent, was arrested for manslaughter and two others were arrested for aiding and abetting. McGuigan was notified by the Harrison Chief of Police that fights would no longer be allowed at his club. However, bouts continued to take place anyway, so this ban was presumably overturned, circumvented, or otherwise resolved.

Boxing bouts at the club were regularly followed by the Newark Evening News and the Newark Star-Eagle. Some notable boxers who fought at the club included Mickey Walker, Battling Levinsky, Tony Galento, Red Chapman, Seamus O'Brien, Frankie Mason, Abie Bain, Little Jackie Sharkey, Battling Bill Hurley, David Kurtz, Allentown Joe Gans, and Harold Farese, among many others.

Bobby Gleason, founder of the famed Gleason's Gym in Brooklyn, NY, made his professional debut at McGuigan's club on December 22, 1918.

A benefit for the Harrison NJ P.B.A on September 18, 1925 at McGuigan's A.C. Paddy can be seen standing in the middle of the ring.

== Personal life ==
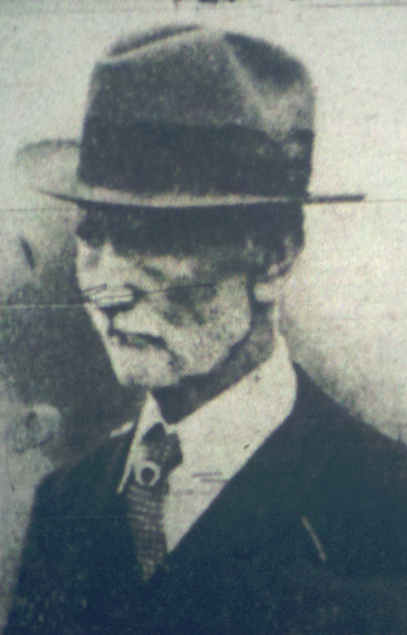
Paddy in his later years.

He was close friends with President Theodore Roosevelt, who was known for his acquaintance among prize-fighters. He was also a member of professional soccer and baseball circles and often trained with Federal League players, including his friend Rupert Mills.

He is noted for having neither drank nor smoked, although he often chewed tobacco. He was an avid soccer fan and would drive to Boston and once Chicago to attend games. Paddy was also a successful gambler and would place bets on almost any sporting event. He often traveled with the West Hudson A.A. professional soccer team and would then return home with a "bundle of greenbacks."

In 1909, McGuigan served as a key witness in the NJ Supreme Court case of Michael Farese v. North Jersey Street Railway Company. The plaintiff Michael Farese was struck by a train car one night as he crossed over its tracks in Harrison, NJ. Farese claimed that he looked for oncoming cars before he crossed, but was struck anyway due to the operator's negligence in possibly not having his headlights on. The trial court ruled in the defendant's favor, stating that based on the evidence presented, if the plaintiff had looked before he crossed, he should have been able to see the oncoming car in time to move to safety. McGuigan, who was on the other side of the street at the time of the accident, testified that he was able to see both Farese and the car before the accident occurred, adding doubts to Farese's claim that he looked but could not see the oncoming car before crossing the tracks, considering McGuigan, as well as other testifying witnesses, was able to see both from a distance away. The NJ Supreme Court ruled that a decision was one for a jury to make, and affirmed the ruling of the lower court in favor of the defendant.

On April 25, 1915, Paddy was involved in an altercation with baseball player Hal Chase following a Buffalo Buffeds loss in Newark, NJ. Chase was walking down South 2nd Street in Harrison when he and a fan named Billy Quinn began exchanging blows after Quinn heckled him over the team's loss. Paddy joined the fight and landed a few painful blows to Chase before local police arrived to break it up.

== Politics ==
McGuigan was a friend of President Theodore Roosevelt and was close with many local and regional politicians. As a sports promoter, he regularly hosted boxing events for the Patrolmen's Benevolent Association in Hudson County, NJ. He became even more intertwined with politics after two of his sons became members of the Harrison Police Department and a third son joined the U.S. Navy.

McGuigan was an enthusiastic supporter of the League of Nations, the precursor to the United Nations.

== Family ==
Paddy's son Harry wearing his U.S. Navy Atlantic Fleet Welterweight championship belt in 1922.

McGuigan and his wife Eleanor had four children, William, Johnnie, Harry, and Eleanor. All three of his sons boxed professionally for a period of time. While William later became a Harrison detective and Johnnie became a clerk in the Harrison Police Court, Harry joined the United States Navy and earned an impressive record as a service boxer, winning several fleet championships and later becoming the boxing coach on the USS Pennsylvania (BB-38). Johnnie was a very clever fighter, but curtailed his career because his mother did not want him to become a boxer.

Johnnie's son and Paddy's grandson, John, also become a Harrison police officer and later switched to the fire department, serving many years as a Harrison firefighter and then fire inspector. He became politically active before serving in World War II and went on to serve on the Harrison Board of Education and the Harrison Town Council. After he died, his wife Peg continued in his place and was re-elected to the Council many times over the years.

Paddy's many descendants are still living in and around New Jersey, as well many other parts of the United States.

== Death and legacy ==
McGuigan's death brought heartbreak to myriad friends, family members, and sports fans and was viewed as the loss of one of the last remaining "old-time fighters." Anthony Marenghi wrote that McGuigan had the same positive influence on the sport of boxing as "Gentleman Jim" Corbett, as McGuigan never drank or smoked and exerted that influence on his three sons, who didn't drink or smoke either.

On July 29, 1937, just over a year before his death, McGuigan was honored during a boxing event at Madison Square Garden along with old-time rival Alex Gallagher, with whom he fought a 25-round draw in Hoboken almost 40 years prior.

When the legendary Jack Johnson learned from friends that Paddy had been laid to bed due to illness, "Lil Artha" departed New York City where he was staying and was at Paddy's bedside within an hour.

Paddy died on Tuesday, September 13, 1938, at his home in Harrison. His family had listed his age as 78, however Paddy, who was unsure of his exact date of birth, always disputed that and claimed he was "at least seven years younger." Additional records place his age at 70 years old at the time of his death. In addition to his close family and friends, many local township officials, members of the Harrison Police Department and Fire Department, and friends from the sports and boxing world attended McGuigan's funeral. A requiem was held at the Holy Cross Church in Harrison, NJ earlier that day. Paddy is buried at Holy Sepulcher Cemetery in Newark, NJ.

McGuigan Place in Harrison, located off Wilhelm Street four blocks south of Harrison Ave, is named in honor of Paddy's grandson P. John McGuigan, who died on August 25, 1978, while serving on the Harrison Town Council.

Shortly before Tom O'Rourke died, he was at a gym in New York and was asked to name the greatest fighter he had ever seen, to which he replied: "Paddy McGuigan, beyond a doubt!"

McGuigan is a member of The New Jersey Boxing Hall of Fame.

== See also ==
- Hurley Boxing Law
- McGuigan Harrison Athletic Club
- Gus Troxler
