= East Newark School District =

School district in Hudson County, New Jersey, US

Address
- 501 North Third Street East Newark, Hudson County, New Jersey, 07029; United States
- Coordinates: 40.74633°N 74.157669°W

District information
- Grades: PreK-8
- Superintendent: Rosaura Bagolie
- Business administrator: Andrea Del Guercio
- Schools: 1

Students and staff
- Enrollment: 240 (as of 2023–24)
- Faculty: 19.4 FTEs
- Student–teacher ratio: 12.4:1

Other information
- District Factor Group: A
- Website: www.eastnewarkschool.org
Ind.	Per pupil	District spending	Rank (*)	K-8 average	%± vs. average
1A	Total Spending	$13,110	1	$18,891	−30.6%
1	Budgetary Cost	9,980	1	14,159	−29.5%
2	Classroom Instruction	5,720	1	8,659	−33.9%
6	Support Services	1,515	11	2,167	−30.1%
8	Administrative Cost	1,364	9	1,547	−11.8%
10	Operations & Maintenance	1,310	13	1,612	−18.7%
13	Extracurricular Activities	43	16	104	−58.7%
16	Median Teacher Salary	44,041	2	61,136
Data from NJDoE 2014 Taxpayers' Guide to Education Spending. *Of K-8 districts with up to 400 students. Lowest spending=1; Highest=71

The East Newark School District is a community public school district that serves students in pre-kindergarten through eighth grade from East Newark, in Hudson County, in the U.S. state of New Jersey.

As of the 2023–24 school year, the district, comprised of one school, had an enrollment of 240 students and 19.4 classroom teachers (on an FTE basis), for a student–teacher ratio of 12.4:1.

For ninth through twelfth grades, public school students attend Harrison High School in Harrison, as part of a sending/receiving relationship with the Harrison Public Schools. As of the 2023–24 school year, the high school had an enrollment of 784 students and 53.0 classroom teachers (on an FTE basis), for a student–teacher ratio of 14.8:1.

== History ==
Citing rising tuition costs, the district announced in 2013 that it was seeking to sever its relationship with Harrison and send its students to Kearny High School, where tuition costs for students would be substantially lower than the $14,674 per student paid to Harrison for the 2012-13 school year. In 2015, the district agreed to a new six-year sending agreement with the Harrison school district under which East Newark would pay $13,000 per student, rising by 2% annually, a drop from the $16,100 cost per student paid as of the 2014-15 school year.

The district had been classified by the New Jersey Department of Education as being in District Factor Group "A", the lowest of eight groupings. District Factor Groups organize districts statewide to allow comparison by common socioeconomic characteristics of the local districts. From lowest socioeconomic status to highest, the categories are A, B, CD, DE, FG, GH, I and J.

== Schools ==
Schools in the district (with 2023–24 enrollment from the National Center for Education Statistics) are:

- East Newark Public School had 138 students in grades PreK–5.

== Administration ==
Core members of the district's administration are:

- Rosaura Bagolie, superintendent and principal
- Andrea Del Guercio, business administrator and board secretary

== Board of education ==
The district's board of education is comprised of seven members who set policy and oversee the fiscal and educational operation of the district through its administration. As a Type I school district, the board's trustees are appointed by the mayor to serve three-year terms of office on a staggered basis, with either one or two members up for reappointment each year. Of the more than 600 school districts statewide, East Newark is one of about a dozen districts with appointed school boards. The board appoints a superintendent to oversee the district's day-to-day operations and a business administrator to supervise the business functions of the district.

The board of education had voted in 2020 to authorize a ballot question that would ask voters if they supported a switch to a Type II / elected school board, but in January 2021 the borough council voted to add two members to the appointed board of education, overriding the board's efforts to shift to an elected school board.
