= McGuigan Harrison Athletic Club =

Sports and social club in New Jersey

- McGuigan's A.C. McGuigan's Arena; The Casino "Bucket of Blood" "Tub of Gore"
- Address: 56 Harrison Avenue, Harrison, NJ
- Owner: Patrick Daniel McGuigan
- Type: Athletic
- Event: Boxing

The McGuigan Harrison Athletic Club, also known as McGuigan's Arena or The Casino, was a popular sports and social club in Harrison, NJ in the early 1900s owned by NJ Hall of Fame boxer and promoter Paddy McGuigan. The club was used primarily to host boxing matches, but also hosted dances and other functions.

McGuigan A.C. Harrison PBA Benefit

== Fight records ==
McGuigan opened his club after the conclusion of his boxing career, which may have gone well into his 50s. Sometimes referred to as Old Paddy McGuigan's "Bucket of Blood," the club was a widely popular venue for at least 18 years, based on dates found in surviving fight records.

Fights at the club were regularly followed by the Newark Evening News and the Newark Star-Eagle.

Surviving Records
Date	Boxer	Weight	Opponent	Weight	Result	Rounds	Type	Notes
10-13-1910	Dave Kurtz		Charley Smith		Win	10	News	Decision from New York City newspaper(s).
11-17-1910	Dave Kurtz		Frank Kenny		Draw	10	News	Decision from New York City newspaper(s).
01-03-1911	Hank Griffin		"Dutch" Zimmer		Win	3	KO	Watertown Daily Times.
01-03-1911	Hank Griffin		Jack McCargo		Win	5	UNK	Watertown Daily Times.
01-03-1911	Hank Griffin		Bull Anderson		UNK	UNK	UNK	Took the place of Freddie Dipples who failed to show. Watertown Daily Times.
01-16-1911	Valentine "Knockout" Brown		Jack Ritchie		Win	2	KO	
02-06-1911	Battling Hurley		Tony Bender		Win	10	News	Decision from the Philadelphia Record.
03-11-1911	Angelo "Young Foster" Venizona		William Kennedy		UNK	4	UNK	Venizona died the next day as a result of injuries sustained during the fight.
02-04-1918	Allentown Joe Gans		Willie Gradwell		Win	8	News	
02-25-1918	Allentown Joe Gans		Lew Cardell		Draw	8	News	
12-09-1918	Jackie Sharkey		Harold Farese		Loss	8	News	
12-23-1918	Phil Krug		Bobby Gleason		Draw	8	News	Gleason's pro debut. He founded the famed Gleason's Gym.
03-19-1919	Jackie Sharkey		Patsy Johnson		Win	8	News	
04-14-1919	Ed Kinley		Battling Levinsky		Loss	8	News	Decision reported from the Illustrated Boxing Record.
05-20-1919	Charley Weinert		Ed Williams		Win	2	TKO	
10-27-1919	Phil Krug		Ed Kinley		Win	8	News	Decision from New York City newspaper(s).
12-19-1919	Mickey Walker	139 lbs	Young Thompson		Win	5	TKO	Decision from northern New Jersey newspaper.
05-03-1920	Bobby Gleason		Allentown Joe Gans		Win	12	News	
12-06-1921	Allentown Joe Gans		Panama Joe Gans		Loss	12	News	Decision from New York City newspaper(s).
10-09-1922	Spencer Gardner		Willie Murphy		Win	12	News	Decision from the Newark Evening News.
10-09-1922	Oliver Gardner		Johnny Dixon		Loss	6	News	Decision from the Newark Evening News.
10-16-1922	Red Chapman		Jimmy Freda		Win	12	News	Decision from The Ring & the Newark Evening News.
10-16-1922	Billy Vidabeck		Willie Applegate		Win	6	News	Decision from the Newark Evening News.
10-23-1922	Red Chapman		Spencer Gardner		Win	12	News	Decision from the Newark Evening News.
11-14-1922	Spencer Gardner		Tommy Gerrard		Win	12	News	Decision from the Newark Evening News.
12-07-1922	Red Chapman		Spencer Gardner		Win	10	News	Decision from the Newark Evening News.
01-25-1923	Willie Herman	138.5 lbs	Marty Mandeville	140 lbs	Win	3	TKO	
01-25-1923	Panama Billy Walker	138 lbs	Bobby Morris	140 lbs	Win	8	News	Decision from the New York Evening Telegram.
01-25-1923	Snowball Moore	148 lbs	Battling Walker	141 lbs	Loss	6	News	Decision from the New York Evening Telegram.
01-25-1923	Joe Barry	116.5 lbs	Eddie West	116.25 lbs	Loss	4	News	Decision from the New York Evening Telegram.
01-25-1923	Clyde Jones	131 lbs	Young Ross	133 lbs	Draw	4	News	Decision from the New York Evening Telegram.
01-25-1923	Charley Murray	127.5 lbs	Kid Callahan	128.15 lbs	Draw	4	News	Decision from the New York Evening Telegram.
02-01-1923	Lew Seltzer	146.5 lbs	Young Banne	143.5 lbs	Win	8	News	Decision from the New York Evening Telegram.
02-01-1923	Johnny Ryan	138 lbs	Joe Bean	135 lbs	Win	4	News	Decision from the New York Evening Telegram.
02-01-1923	Charley Reed	136.5 lbs	Kid Beans	135 lbs	Win	4	News	Decision from the New York Evening Telegram.
02-01-1923	Joe Ross	133.5 lbs	Lew Farrell	132.5 lbs	Win	2	TKO	
02-01-1923	Johnny Dixon	126 lbs	Artie Gold	124 lbs	Win	4	News	Decision from the New York Evening Telegram.
02-13-1923	Tommy Stapleton		Bert Smithers		Win	8	KO	
02-13-1923	Joe O'Brien		Mickey Griffin		Loss	4	News	Decision from the Newark Star-Eagle.
02-20-1923	Battling Johnson		Joe Senter		Cancelled	0	X	Fight was canceled due to Johnson's illness, declined to fight others.
04-03-1923	Billy Moore		Jim Halliday		Scheduled	UNK	UNK	Outcome unknown.
04-03-1923	Mickey Lebor		Johnny Dixon		Scheduled	UNK	UNK	Outcome unknown.
04-24-1923	Willie Crystal		Jack McFarland		Loss	12	News	Decision from the Newark Star-Eagle.
04-24-1923	Larry Estridge		James Thomas		Win	1	KO	
05-10-1923	Ray Pryel		Jimmy Duffy		Scheduled	12	UNK	Outcome unknown.
05-21-1923	Billy White		Jack Ritchie		Win	6	News	Decision from the Newark Star-Eagle.
05-21-1923	Joey Russell		Frankie Mason		Win	4	News	Decision from the Newark Star-Eagle.
06-07-1923	Joey Russell		Patsy Moore		Win	1	TKO	
06-28-1923	Leo Gates		Bill Holliday		Scheduled	12	UNK	Outcome unknown.
08-09-1923	George Mulholland		Jackie Brown		Scheduled	UNK	UNK	Outcome unknown. Rematch of Mulholland's victory a week before in West New York, NJ.
09-06-1923	Jack Rappaport	140 lbs	Shamus O'Brien	144 lbs	Loss	12	News	Decision from the Newark Star-Eagle.
02-11-1924	Mickey Walters		Charley Traino		Win	10	News	Sometimes attributed to Mickey Walker. Decision from New York City newspaper(s).
02-05-1925	Benny Tressito		Philly Griffin		Loss	6	News	Decision from the Newark Star-Eagle.
02-05-1925	Sollie Castellane		Bobby Rinker		Win	1	KO	
02-05-1925	Jack Stone		Sid Kelly		Win	3	KO	
02-05-1925	Sammy Tucker		Matty DiSantis		Win	UNK	News	Decision from the Newark Star-Eagle.
06-12-1925	Nate Isaacson		Steve Samsky		Win	UNK	News	Decision from the Newark Star-Eagle.
06-19-1925	Charley Wells		Nick Resa		Win	4	News	
06-30-1925	Willie Ferguson		Jimmy Britt		Win	1	KO	
06-30-1925	Midget Herman		Nick Carter		Win	6	TKO	
07-09-1925	Larry Roach		Kid Leon		Win	1	KO	
07-09-1925	Bobby Morris		Whitney Miller		Win	8	News	Decision from the Newark Evening News.
07-17-1925	Benny Tressito		Philly Griffin		Loss	6	News	Decision from the Newark Star-Eagle.
07-17-1925	Abie Bain		Willie Ferguson		Win	3	KO	
07-17-1925	Joe Harbelt		Dal Hawkins		Win	6	News	Decision from the Newark Star-Eagle.
09-11-1925	Nate Isaacson		Sailor Joe Downey		Win	10	News	
03-26-1926	Buddy Dawson		Sollie Castellane		Loss	8	News	Decision from the Newark Star-Eagle.
07-09-1926	Sammy Tucker		Sammy Parker		Win	1	KO	
08-20-1926	Sailor Darden	145 lbs	Joe Moresco	142 lbs	Win	10	News	Decision from the Chester Times in PA.
09-14-1926	Abie Bain		Sailor Darden		Loss	10	News	Decision from the Newark Star-Eagle.
09-14-1926	Phil Krug		Danny Fagan		Win	10	News	Decision from the Newark Star-Eagle.
09-14-1926	Joey Russell		Babe Adams		Win	8	News	Decision from the Newark Star-Eagle.
09-14-1926	Lenny Banks		Billy Devoe		Win	1	TKO	
08-27-1928	Tony Galento		James Jay Lawless		Loss	5	DQ	

== Controversy ==
On March 4, 1911, a boy boxer named Angelo "Young Foster" Venizona died after being hospitalized due to injuries sustained in a bout with boxer William Kennedy at McGuigan's club the previous night. Reportedly, the match ended without a knockdown or knockout after four rounds and both competitors shook hands in the dressing room. Shortly afterwards, Venizona fell backwards onto the ground while sitting on a railing inside the club. A physician instructed Venizona to be taken home after evaluating him. After a confrontation between the boy's father and the men who took him home regarding the source of his injury, Venizona was taken to the City Hospital in Newark. Harrison detectives ruled that Venizona's death was caused by a blood clot at the base of his brain due to a blow to the head sustained during the match, which may have also caused him to fall off of the railing afterwards. Kennedy was arrested and charged with manslaughter. McGuigan and two other men were arrested and charged with aiding and abetting, arraigned in the Harrison Police Courts, and taken to the Hudson County Courthouse. McGuigan was released on $500 bail, while the two others were held as material witnesses. Upon receiving a letter from the case prosecutor, Harrison's Chief of Police notified McGuigan that boxing matches would no longer be permitted at the club. It is unknown how this ban was resolved or circumvented, as bouts continued to take place at the club for at least the following 15 years.
