= Tom O'Rourke =

Tom O'Rourke may refer to:

- Tom O'Rourke (boxing manager) (1856–1936)
- Tom O'Rourke (baseball) (1865–1929), Major League Baseball catcher
- Tom O'Rourke (1944-2009), American actor, known for Against the Current (film)
