= Bhairavi Desai =

American social activist

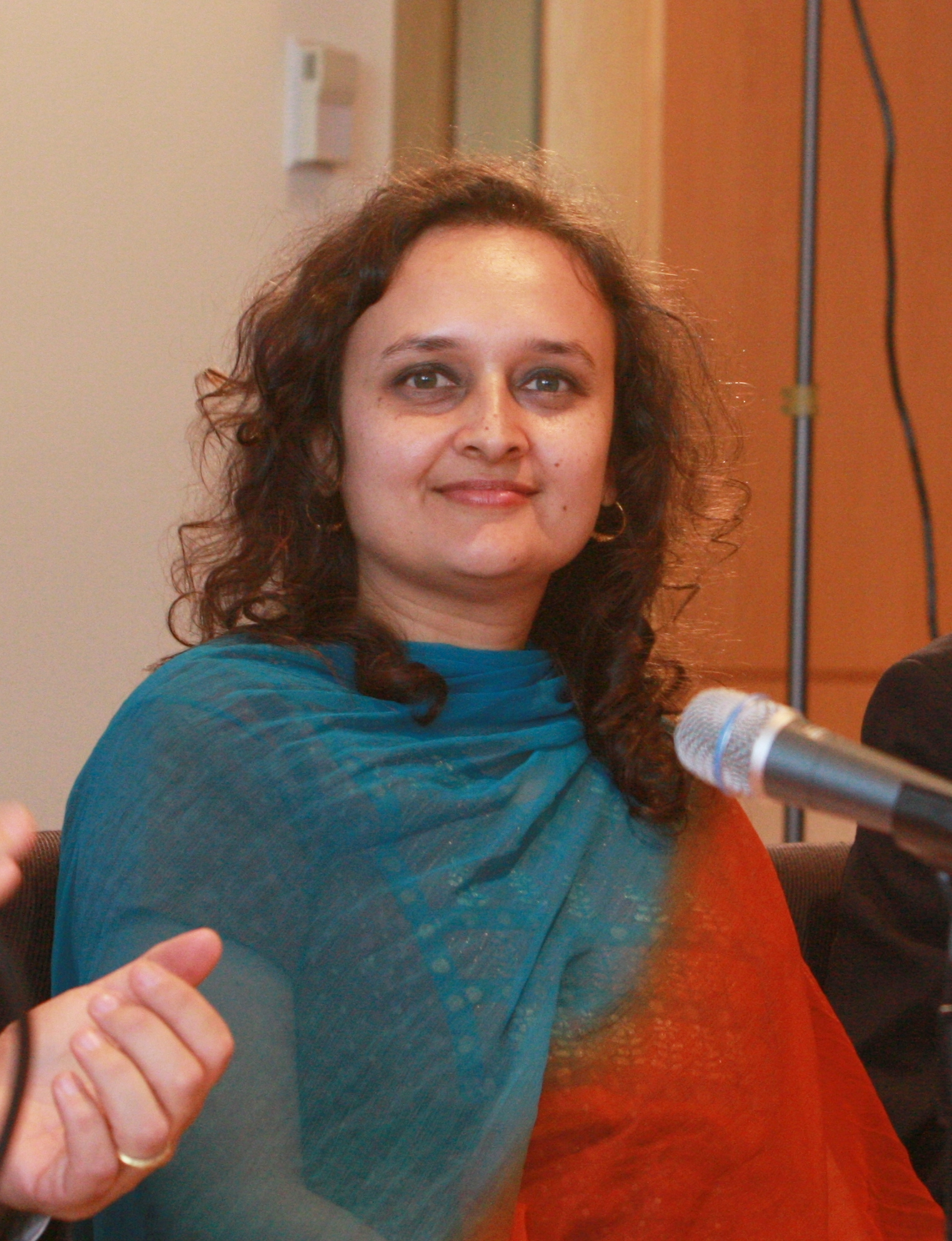
- Desai on October 20, 2011
- Born: Gujarat, India
- Known for: Founding member of the New York Taxi Workers Alliance

Bhairavi Desai (pronounced BY-ra-vee They-SIGH) is an American social activist and a founding member of the New York Taxi Workers Alliance, a union representing approximately 15,000 taxi drivers in New York City.

She is known as a progressive social activist, including her efforts for social justice for the "Cuba, Palestine, and El Salvador solidarity movements".

== Early life ==
Desai was born in Gujarat, India, and came with her parents to Harrison, New Jersey, when she was six years old. Her father was a lawyer in India, but was unable to find work in the legal profession, consequently finding work at a grocery store. As a student at Harrison High School, she was selected for the National Honor Society and was chosen to attend the Governor's School of New Jersey.

She received a degree in Women's Studies from Rutgers University and following that, worked at Manavi, the South Asian women's organization in New Jersey that worked with victims of domestic violence.

She then moved to working for the rights of Asian workers by joining the Committee Against Asian American Violence in 1996. In 1998, she and others set up the NYTWA with an initial membership of 700 workers.

She currently resides in the Bronx, where her husband Victor Salazar, is also a union activist.

== Work with taxi drivers ==
Her first success came in May 1998 when the first strike in thirty years was called by the yellow cabs. Over 90% of New York taxi drivers joined the strike to protest against unfair regulations, medical checkups and health insurance for the drivers. Despite being a woman in an overwhelmingly male-dominated industry, many taxi drivers respect her.

Desai and the TWA were involved in initiating new regulations (2011) by the New York City Taxi and Limousine Commission regarding the lucrative business of rooftop ads on taxis. These highly visible and mobile advertisements generate income for the medallion owners but are considered a burden by the taxi owners who work for them: drivers have never had a voice in their selection nor a stake in their revenue. In recent years, many of the rooftop signs have caused controversy by promoting businesses in adult entertainment. According to the new act, drivers who own their own vehicles are now permitted ultimate veto power over any advertisements that they can "reasonably" regard as "inappropriate". In a longer view, Desai anticipates that this act serves as "a step toward ultimately requiring medallion owners to give some of the revenue from taxi-roof advertisements to vehicle owners."

== Other activities ==
Desai received the Ford Foundation Leadership for a Changing World Award in 2005. She was a regular contributor to forums and events at the Marxist Brecht Forum.

== See also ==
- Indians in the New York City metropolitan area
- Taxicabs of New York City
