= Harrison High School (New Jersey) =

High school in New Jersey, United States

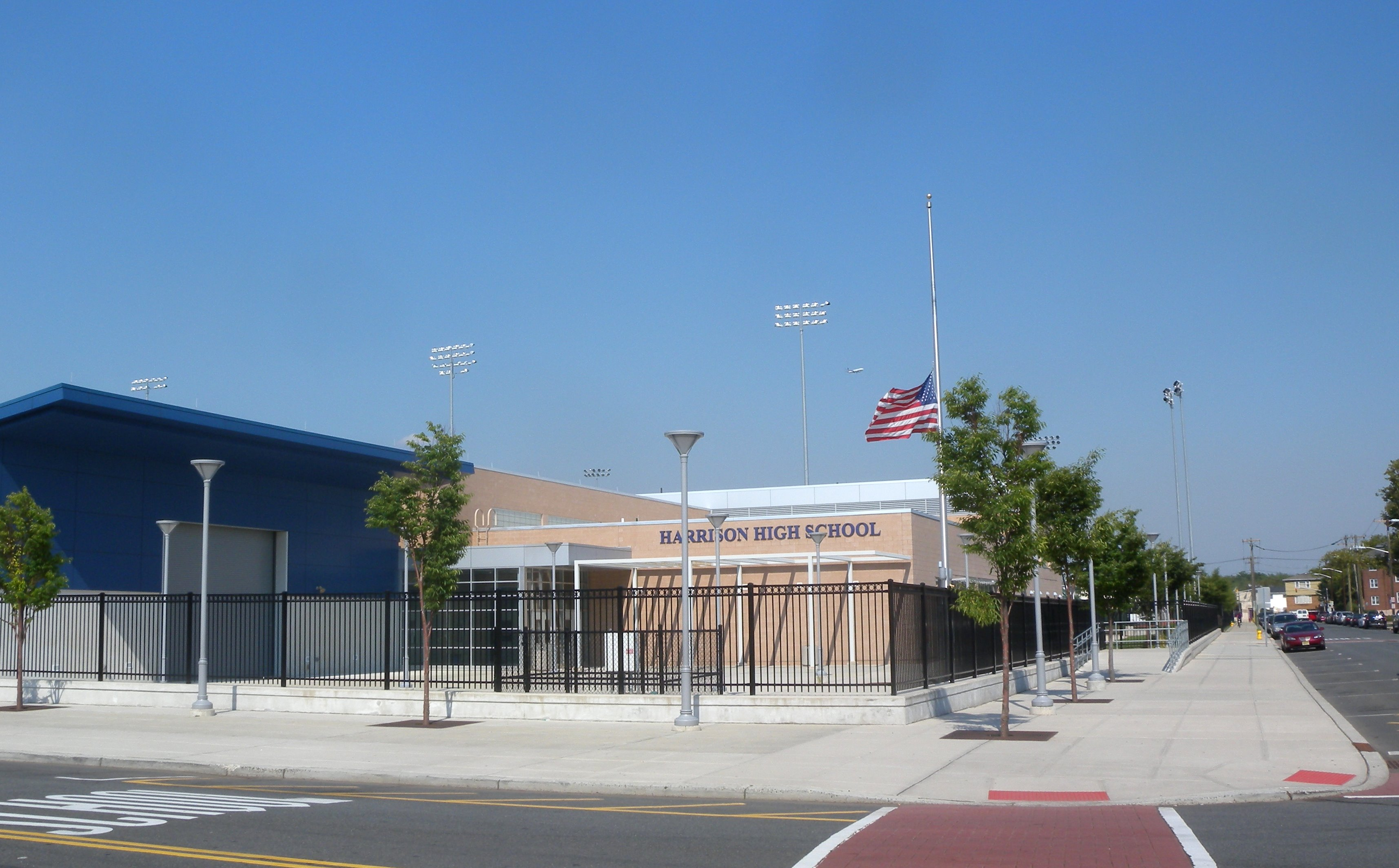

Location
- 800 Hamilton Street; Harrison, Hudson County, New Jersey 07029; United States; 40.74913°N 74.148349°W

Information
- Type: Public high school
- School district: Harrison Public Schools
- NCES School ID: 340687002738
- Principal: Matthew D. Weber
- Faculty: 50.0 FTEs
- Grades: 9-12
- Enrollment: 795 (as of 2024–25)
- Student to teacher ratio: 15.9:1
- Colors: Columbia Blue; Navy Blue and white
- Athletics conference: North Jersey Interscholastic Conference
- Team name: Blue Tide
- Yearbook: Harrisonian
- Website: Official website

Harrison High School is a four-year comprehensive public high school serving students in ninth through twelfth grades, located in Harrison, in the U.S. state of New Jersey, operating as the lone secondary school of the Harrison Public Schools. Students from East Newark attend Harrison High School as part of a sending/receiving relationship with the East Newark School District, though the East Newark district has sought to switch to sending students to Kearny High School, citing potential cost savings.

As of the 2024–25 school year, the school had an enrollment of 795 students and 50.0 classroom teachers (on an FTE basis), for a student–teacher ratio of 15.9:1. There were 594 students (74.7% of enrollment) eligible for free lunch and 122 (15.3% of students) eligible for reduced-cost lunch.

== History ==
In 2000, the then Harrison High School building (now Washington Middle School) was used as the location of an open casting call by HBO for the series The Sopranos, which brought 15,000-plus TV star hopefuls to the town, doubling the town's population and bringing traffic to a standstill.

In September 2013, Harrison High School was recognized with the National Blue Ribbon School Award of Excellence by the United States Department of Education, one of 286 in the country to receive the award that year.

== Awards, recognition and rankings ==
In September 2013, Harrison High School was recognized by the United States Department of Education as an Exemplary Improving School, as part of the National Blue Ribbon Schools Program.

The school was the 289th-ranked public high school in New Jersey out of 339 schools statewide in New Jersey Monthly magazine's September 2014 cover story on the state's "Top Public High Schools", using a new ranking methodology. The school had been ranked 205th in the state of 328 schools in 2012, after being ranked 213th in 2010 out of 322 schools listed. The magazine ranked the school 216th in 2008 out of 316 schools. The school was ranked 227th in the magazine's September 2006 issue, which surveyed 316 schools across the state.

Schooldigger.com ranked the school 285th out of 367 public high schools statewide in its 2009-10 rankings which were based on the combined percentage of students classified as proficient or above proficient on the language arts literacy and mathematics components of the High School Proficiency Assessment (HSPA).

== Athletics ==
The Harrison High School Blue Tide participate in the Meadowlands Division of the North Jersey Interscholastic Conference, which is comprised of small-enrollment schools in Bergen, Hudson, Morris and Passaic counties, and was created following a reorganization of sports leagues in Northern New Jersey by the New Jersey State Interscholastic Athletic Association (NJSIAA). Prior to the NJSIAA's 2010 realignment, the school had participated in the Bergen County Scholastic League (BCSL). With 525 students in grades 10-12, the school was classified by the NJSIAA for the 2019–20 school year as Group II for most athletic competition purposes, which included schools with an enrollment of 486 to 758 students in that grade range. Without enough players to justify fielding a team, the school elected to sit out the 2024-25 football season.

Interscholastic sports played at Harrison High School include:

- Boys' sports - Soccer, Basketball, Volleyball, Tennis, Swimming, Cross Country, and Baseball
- Girls' sports - Volleyball, Tennis, Soccer, Basketball, Swimming, Cross Country, Flag Football, and Softball
- Co-Ed - Cheerleading and Bowling

The boys soccer team holds the United States high school record with 25 state championships. The boys soccer team won the Group II championship in 1946-1950, 1991 (co-champion with Cinnaminson High School), 2001 (vs. Northern Burlington County Regional High School), 2002 (vs. Hopewell Valley Central High School) and 2003 (co-champion with Delran High School); Group I in 1953-1955, 1958-1960, 1966 (co-champion with Jamesburg High School), 1968 (co-champion with Chatham High School), 1970 (co-champion with Chatham), 1972 (co-champion with Jamesburg), 1975 (vs. Riverside High School), 1976 (co-champion with Riverside), 2006 (vs. Metuchen High School), 2007 (vs. Arthur P. Schalick High School), 2008 (vs. South River High School) and 2014 (vs. Haddon Township High School). The team has won a total of 25 state championships, tied for the most in the state; this total includes titles awarded to the team in 1946-1950, 1954, 1955, 1958 and 1959, prior to the playoff era. The 15 state titles won via playoffs are the second most of any school in the state, The 1966 team finished the season at 12-1-4 after the Group I championship game with Jamesburg ended in a 1–1 tie. The 1972 team finished the season with 13-2-4 record after being declared as the Group I co-champion with Jamesburg following a 1–1 tie after double overtime in the tournament final played at Fairleigh Dickinson University. The 1991 team finished the season with an 18-4-2 after the Group II championship game with Cinnaminson ended in a 0-0 time, marking the program's sixth state championship, five of them as co-champions. The team won the 2006 North II, Group I state sectional championship with a 2-1 win against Glen Ridge High School, then won the Group I state championship with a 2-0 win over Waldwick High School in the semifinals and a 6-0 win against Metuchen in the finals. The 2007 team repeated as North II, Group I state sectional championship with a 3-1 win over Jonathan Dayton High School in the tournament final. The 2007 team won the Group I state championship with a 2-1 win over Arthur P. Schalick High School, the team's 23rd state championship, finishing the season with an 18–5–2 record. The 2008 team won the Group I state championship with a 2-1 win over South River High School. The team finished the season 22-1-1 record and won the 2013 North II, Group II state sectional championship with a 4-0 victory against Leonia High School also winning the Hudson County Tournament against Memorial High School by a score of 2-0. The team finished the season with a 24–3 record and won the program's 25th state title in 2014 with a 4-0 victory against Haddon Township in the Group I final at Kean University. The team finished the season 20-4 record and won the 2016 North II, Group II state sectional championship with a 2-2 penalty shootout victory against Dover High School.

The boys' bowling team won the overall state championship in 1959.

The 1960 boys' basketball team won the Group I state title with a 66-54 Dunellen High School in the championship game.

The football team won the 1986 North I Group II state sectional title with a 19-0 win against Hawthorne High School in the championship game, to finish the season with an 8–2–1 record.

The girls' basketball team won the Group III state championship in 1991 with a 61-49 win against runner-up Manasquan High School in the finals.

The boys' volleyball team won the West Jersey Volleyball League, Hudson County, and NJSIAA North II state sectional championships in 2015 and repeated the feat in 2016.

== The new Harrison High School ==
The new Harrison High School opened its doors in September 2007 for the 2007-08 academic year. The new school, located on the former site of Clayton Container, initiated construction in January 2005 and lasted over two years, with the bulk of its electrical work completed in the summer of 2007. A new athletic complex constructed adjacent to the school building was completed in September 2006, which includes a football/soccer field, baseball diamond, softball diamond, track around the fields, and three tennis courts. Spaces for the high school include thirty general classrooms, four special education classrooms, two classrooms for small group instruction, two gymnasiums (one big, one small), a dance/aerobics studio, instrumental/vocal music room, cafeteria, auditorium, media center, science labs, three computer rooms, a swimming pool, and faculty spaces. The building has three floors. The first floor consists of the main office, the nurse's office, the gymnasiums, and the main places. The classrooms are located on the second and third floors. There is a period scheduling of classes (43 minutes per period, with eight periods per day and lunch straddling the 4th period to 6th period). The building formerly known as Harrison High School opened as the new Washington Middle School in September 2007 for students in grades 6-8.

== Administration ==
The school's principal is Matthew D. Weber. His core administration team includes the two assistant principals.

== Notable alumni ==
- Dave D'Errico (born 1952), former professional soccer player
- Bhairavi Desai, director of the New York Taxi Workers Alliance
- Daisy Fuentes (born 1966, class of 1984), model
- Joe Gardi (c. 1939-2010), head football coach at Hofstra University for 16 seasons, from 1990 to 2005, where he compiled a record of 119–62–2
- Ray Lucas (born 1972), NFL quarterback who played for the New York Jets
- Fred Shields (1912-1985), soccer player who was a member of the U.S. soccer team at the 1936 Summer Olympics and was a phys ed instructor at HHS for 40 years
- Omar Sowe (born 2000, class of 2019), soccer player who plays as a forward for New York Red Bulls II in the USL Championship

== Notable faculty ==
- George Tintle (1892-1975), National Soccer Hall of Fame goalkeeper who coached seven undefeated soccer teams at HHS
