= Harrison Public Schools =

School district in New Jersey, United States

Address
- 430 William Street Harrison, Hudson County, New Jersey, 07029; United States
- Coordinates: 40.748887°N 74.156052°W

District information
- Grades: PreK-12
- Superintendent: Maureen Kroog (acting)
- Business administrator: Daniel Choffo
- Schools: 4
- Affiliation(s): Former Abbott district

Students and staff
- Enrollment: 2,409 (as of 2018–19)
- Faculty: 166.5 FTEs
- Student–teacher ratio: 14.5:1

Other information
- District Factor Group: B
- Website: www.harrisonschools.org
Ind.	Per pupil	District spending	Rank (*)	K-12 average	%± vs. average
1A	Total Spending	$22,061	64	$18,891	16.8%
1	Budgetary Cost	15,390	54	14,783	4.1%
2	Classroom Instruction	8,334	40	8,763	−4.9%
6	Support Services	2,621	58	2,392	9.6%
8	Administrative Cost	1,794	58	1,485	20.8%
10	Operations & Maintenance	2,113	63	1,783	18.5%
13	Extracurricular Activities	210	4	268	−21.6%
16	Median Teacher Salary	72,886	65	64,043
Data from NJDoE 2014 Taxpayers' Guide to Education Spending. *Of K-12 districts with 1,800-3,500 students. Lowest spending=1; Highest=68

The Harrison Public Schools is a comprehensive public school district serving students in pre-kindergarten through twelfth grade, located in the municipality of Harrison, in Hudson County, in the U.S. state of New Jersey. Harrison is located 12 miles (19 km) west of New York City, and is sandwiched between Newark (the state's largest city) to the west and Jersey City to the east. The district is one of 31 former Abbott districts statewide that were established pursuant to the decision by the New Jersey Supreme Court in Abbott v. Burke which are now referred to as "SDA Districts" based on the requirement for the state to cover all costs for school building and renovation projects in these districts under the supervision of the New Jersey Schools Development Authority. As of the 2018–19 school year, the district, comprising four schools, had an enrollment of 2,409 students and 166.5 classroom teachers (on an FTE basis), for a student–teacher ratio of 14.5:1.

The district is classified by the New Jersey Department of Education as being in District Factor Group "B", the second lowest of eight groupings. District Factor Groups organize districts statewide to allow comparison by common socioeconomic characteristics of the local districts. From lowest socioeconomic status to highest, the categories are A, B, CD, DE, FG, GH, I and J.

Students from the neighboring borough of East Newark attend the district's high school as part of a sending/receiving relationship with the East Newark School District.

== Schools ==
Schools in the district (with 2019 - 20 enrollment data from the National Center for Education Statistics) are:

- Harrison Early Childhood Program (grades Pre-K3 and PreK4)
- Kennedy Elementary School (grades Pre-K - 1)
  - JoAnn Botch, principal
- Lincoln Elementary School with 562 students in grades 2-3
  - Amy M. Heberling, principal
- Hamilton Intermediate School with 307 students in grades 4-5
  - Kevin Stahl, principal

Middle school

- Washington Middle School with 417 students in grades 6-8
  - Michael Landy, principal

High school

- Harrison High School with 692 students in grades 9-12
  - Matthew D. Weber, principal

=== New schools and grade realignment ===
The construction of a new structure to house Harrison High School began in January, 2005, and was completed in the summer of 2007 in time for the 2007-2008 school year. The new Harrison High School is located at the intersection of Kingsland Avenue and Hamilton Street in the northeastern corner of the town on the former site of Clayton Container. A new stadium was constructed along with the school building. The campus includes a football/soccer field, baseball diamond, softball diamond, running track around the fields, and 3 tennis courts. The building includes thirty general education classrooms, four special education classrooms, two classrooms for small group instruction, two gymnasiums, a dance/aerobics studio, instrumental/vocal music room, cafeteria, auditorium, media center, science labs, computer room, and faculty spaces.

Although Washington Middle School has been relocated to the former site of the high school, the planned remodeling of the old high school has been put on hold indefinitely due to funding issues involving the New Jersey Schools Construction Corporation and mismanagement of funds.

In September 2007, Harrison realigned the grades being housed in each of the school buildings in town. The new Harrison High School located on Hamilton Street between Kingsland and Schuyler Avenues opened to students in grades 9–12. As a result, the old Harrison High School building, located on 1 North 5th Street, was renamed as Washington Middle School. The old Washington Middle School, in turn, located on Hamilton Street between North 2nd and North 3rd Streets, has been renamed Hamilton School and now houses the 4th and 5th grades that formerly used the top floors of Holy Cross School. Holy Cross School has since been vacated by the Harrison Public School district.

== Choice program ==
The Harrison Public School District participates in the Interdistrict Public School Choice Program. For the 2005–06. school year parents can request to transfer a child from the Washington School, designated by the State of New Jersey as a Category I School, to another school which is not a Category I School. Since there is only one elementary school in Harrison, parents can request a transfer to the Hoboken Public Schools under the Choice program. A transfer request will depend upon the capacity of the selected Hoboken school.

== Administration ==
Core members of the district's administration are:

- Maureen Kroog, acting superintendent
- Daniel Choffo, business administrator and board secretary

== Board of education ==
The district's board of education is comprised of nine members, who set policy and oversee the fiscal and educational operation of the district through its administration. As a Type I school district, the board's trustees are appointed by the mayor to serve three-year terms of office on a staggered basis, with three members up for reappointment each year. Of the more than 600 school districts statewide, Harrison is one of 15 districts with appointed school boards. The board appoints a superintendent to oversee the district's day-to-day operations and a business administrator to supervise the business functions of the district.
