= Fred Shields (soccer) =

American soccer player and referee

Personal information
- Full name: Fred Julius Shields
- Birth name: Ferdinand Julius Zbikowski
- Date of birth: November 18, 1912
- Place of birth: Harrison, New Jersey, U.S.
- Date of death: January 28, 1985 (aged 72)
- Place of death: Harrison, New Jersey, U.S.

Senior career*
Years	Team	Apps	(Gls)
- Newark Portuguese
- Independent
- Prague
- Kearny Scots-Americans

International career
1936	United States	1	(0)
- * Club domestic league appearances and goals

Fred Julius Shields (born Ferdinand Julius Zbikowski; November 18, 1912 – January 28, 1985) was a U.S. soccer player who was a member of the U.S. soccer team at the 1936 Summer Olympics. He played professionally in the American Soccer League and is a member of the National Soccer Hall of Fame.

Zbikowski was born in Harrison, New Jersey, where he played soccer at Harrison High School. He then attended Panzer College. He played for the Newark Portuguese in the State League, Independent F.C. in the Northern New Jersey League, Prague Football Club and the Kearny Scots-Americans of the American Soccer League. He was a member of the U.S. soccer team at the 1936 Summer Olympics. He served with the Third Army during World War II. Shields was a physical education instructor at Harrison High School for 40 years; his wife also taught at the school, and his son Ron was HHS principal for 19 years. He served as a high school, college and senior amateur referee from 1946 to 1973. He was also a referee of some 1948 National Challenge Cup games. At some point, he changed his name to Fred Shields. He was inducted into the National Soccer Hall of Fame in 1968 under that name.
