= George Tintle =

American soccer player

Personal information
- Full name: George J. Tintle
- Date of birth: December 24, 1892
- Place of birth: Harrison, New Jersey, United States
- Date of death: January 14, 1975 (aged 82)
- Place of death: Harrison, New Jersey, United States
- Position: Goalkeeper

Senior career*
Years	Team	Apps	(Gls)
1908–1914	Harrison Alley Boys		
1914–1916	Independent F.C.		
1916–1917	Brooklyn Celtic		
1919	Paterson F.C.		
1920–1921	Erie A.A.		
1921–1923	Harrison S.C.	18	(0)

International career
1916	United States	2	(0)

Managerial career
- Harrison High School
- * Club domestic league appearances and goals

George Tintle (December 24, 1892 – January 14, 1975) was a U.S. soccer goalkeeper who played the first two U.S. national team games in 1916. He spent at least ten seasons in the National Association Football League and two in the first American Soccer League. He is a member of the National Soccer Hall of Fame.

== Professional ==
In 1908, Tintle began his professional career with the Harrison Alley Boys. He remained with the Alley Boys until 1914. He then played with Independent F.C. of Harrison. He spent at least one season, 1916–1917; with Brooklyn Celtic before entering the U.S. Army for World War I. In addition to playing for Celtic, Tintle also went on loan to the Alley Boys during the spring of 1916. After returning from service with the 29th Division in France in 1919 joined Bethlehem Steel for a Scandinavian tour.. He then spent a single season with Paterson F.C. and one season, 1920–1921, with Erie A.A. When the American Soccer League replaced the NAFBL in 1921, Tintle spent two seasons with Harrison S.C.

== National team ==
Tintle earned two caps with the US men's national team in 1916. In the first official U.S. national team game, the U.S. defeated Sweden on August 20, 1916. On September 3, 1916, Tintle and his team mates tied Norway before returning to the U.S.

== Coaching ==
Tintle coached Harrison High School after retiring from playing professionally. According to the Soccer Hall of Fame, his team went seven seasons undefeated.

He was inducted into the National Soccer Hall of Fame in 1953.
