= Gus Troxler =

American boxer

Gus Troxler (c. 1871 – February 16, 1945) was an American strong man, boxer, actor, sports promoter, physical-training expert, and inventor.

A resident of Caldwell, New Jersey, he was a lobbyist for the legalization of boxing in New Jersey in 1918 and is credited as one of the three men responsible for the sport's subsequent popularity and success in the state, alongside Paddy McGuigan and John Patrick Donnelly.
