= Anthony Marenghi =

American sportswriter

Anthony Marenghi was an American sportswriter who wrote for the Newark Star-Ledger in the early 1900s. He was best known for covering boxing and his column "From Pillar to Post."

On January 14, 1960, Marenghi was presented with a special award by the Boxing Association of New York, now the BWAA, for 40 years of boxing coverage. On the same night, the BWAA also awarded Ingemar Johansson the Edward J. Neil Trophy for 1959's "Fighter of the Year."

From the great-nephew of Anthony Marenghi (Paul J. Molinaro). Anthony was born in Newark, New Jersey. His brothers and sisters often teased him, because he was always reading - even at the dinner table. Thus, it was no surprise that Anthony never finished high school but made his living as a professional writer. His expert knowledge of boxing came easy to him as he truly loved the sport and loved writing about it.
