= Hurley Boxing Law =

New Jersey Legislature
- Long title: An Act to legalize boxing exhibitions in the State of New Jersey
- Citation: Laws of New Jersey, 1918
- Territorial extent: New Jersey, United States
- Passed by: New Jersey Legislature
- Passed: February 27, 1918
- Signed by: Governor Walter Edge
- Signed: March 5, 1918
- Introduced by: Assemblyman Joseph Hurley

The Hurley Boxing Law was a law passed in New Jersey in 1918 that legalized boxing in the state for the first time.

== Background ==
Boxing exhibitions had previously been illegal under a provision of the New Jersey Crimes Act, which made it a misdemeanor for "any two or more persons to fight together or commit or attempt to commit assaults and batteries upon each other" or to aid and abet such an event in a public or private place.

Boxing was a polarizing issue in New Jersey at the start of the 20th century, as some viewed the sport as an artistic form of competition and fitness, while others viewed it as a spectacle solely displaying violence and brutality. Prizefighting bouts were often held in secret locations that were difficult to find or access, such as in underground halls, barns, meadows, and in many cases, barges on rivers and bays to prevent police from breaking them up.

The underlying bill was introduced by NJ Assemblyman Joseph Hurley in 1917, passed by the state Senate on February 27, 1918, and was signed into law on March 5, 1918, by Governor Walter Edge. Senators Pilgrim of Essex County and Glennon of Hudson County, who supported the bill, declared that, "boxing could not be considered a brutal sport in these days of war, but that on the contrary it was useful for young men."

Many attempts were made by anti-boxing and religious groups, to no avail, to halt the Jack Dempsey-Georges Carpentier world heavyweight championship fight at Boyle's Thirty Acres on July 2, 192, and to arrest the participants, based on the fact that the New Jersey Crimes Act was technically still in effect.

== Conditions ==
The conditions required for boxing exhibitions to be permitted under the law were as follows:

- Fights were not to exceed 8 rounds.
- Decisions could not be made.
- Use of gloves weighing at least eight ounces.
- Boxers had to complete a thorough physical exam by a competent physician before entering the ring.
- Alcohol could not be served in any place boxing exhibitions were held.

In April 1920, New Jersey began to allow exhibitions up to 12 rounds.
