= Tom O'Rourke (boxing manager) =

American boxer

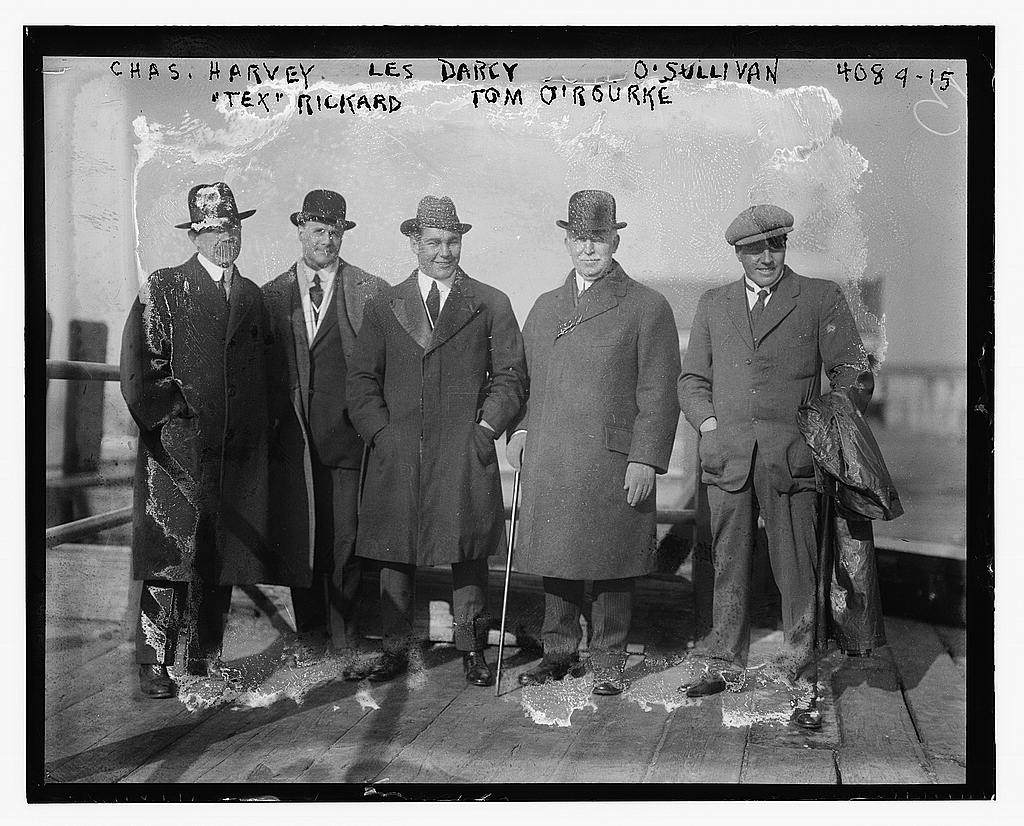
Tom O'Rourke (second from right) along with Chas Harvey, Tex Rickard, Les Darcy and O'Sullivan (left to right)

Tom O'Rourke (May 13, 1856 – June 19, 1936) was born in Boston and became a boxing manager in the late nineteenth and early twentieth centuries.

O'Rourke boxed in his youth, but his primary talent was rowing. He began managing boxers in the late 1880s, finally getting the black bantamweight George Dixon in his stable in 1889. O'Rourke saw Dixon outmatch Paddy Kelly in Boston, and began managing him to an eventual meeting with Cal McCarthy, the lightweight champion of the world. The bout ended in a draw, so O'Rourke and Dixon took their show on the road, eventually claiming the world championship in 1891, and the featherweight championship in 1892 in New Orleans in a rare (for the time) mixed-race bout, a tribute to O'Rourke's matchmaking abilities.

In addition to Dixon, O'Rourke managed Joe Walcott (note: not Jersey Joe Walcott, who took his name from O'Rourke's boxer), who won the welterweight championship of the world in 1901. Walcott and Dixon are famous for traveling with O'Rourke in a "take on all comers" tour, where O'Rourke had his own, slightly smaller than usual, boxing ring for the bouts. The smaller ring gave his boxers an advantage, as both men were known for their straightforward style.

In 1902, O'Rourke arranged the World Series of Football while serving as manager of Madison Square Garden trying to bring in attractions while promoting various boxing events. Pop Warner played his last game for the event. He held another World Series of Football in 1903 but lackluster support led him to end the event.

Another well-known boxer of O'Rourke's is Sailor Tom Sharkey, who was managed by O'Rourke when he lost the heavyweight title bout with James J. Jeffries in 1899.

The number one fighter that he began managing was George Gardner, once the Light Heavyweight Champion of the World in 1903. Gardner won the title from Jack Root and lost the title to Bob Fitzsimmons. It is often thought that the Fitzsimmons match was a publicity stunt, possibly a bribery making Fitzsimmons the first triple title champion in boxing history.

O'Rourke died after collapsing in Max Schmeling's dressing room prior to his bout with Joe Louis on June 19, 1936.
