= Harrison, New Jersey =

Town in Hudson County, New Jersey, US

- Town
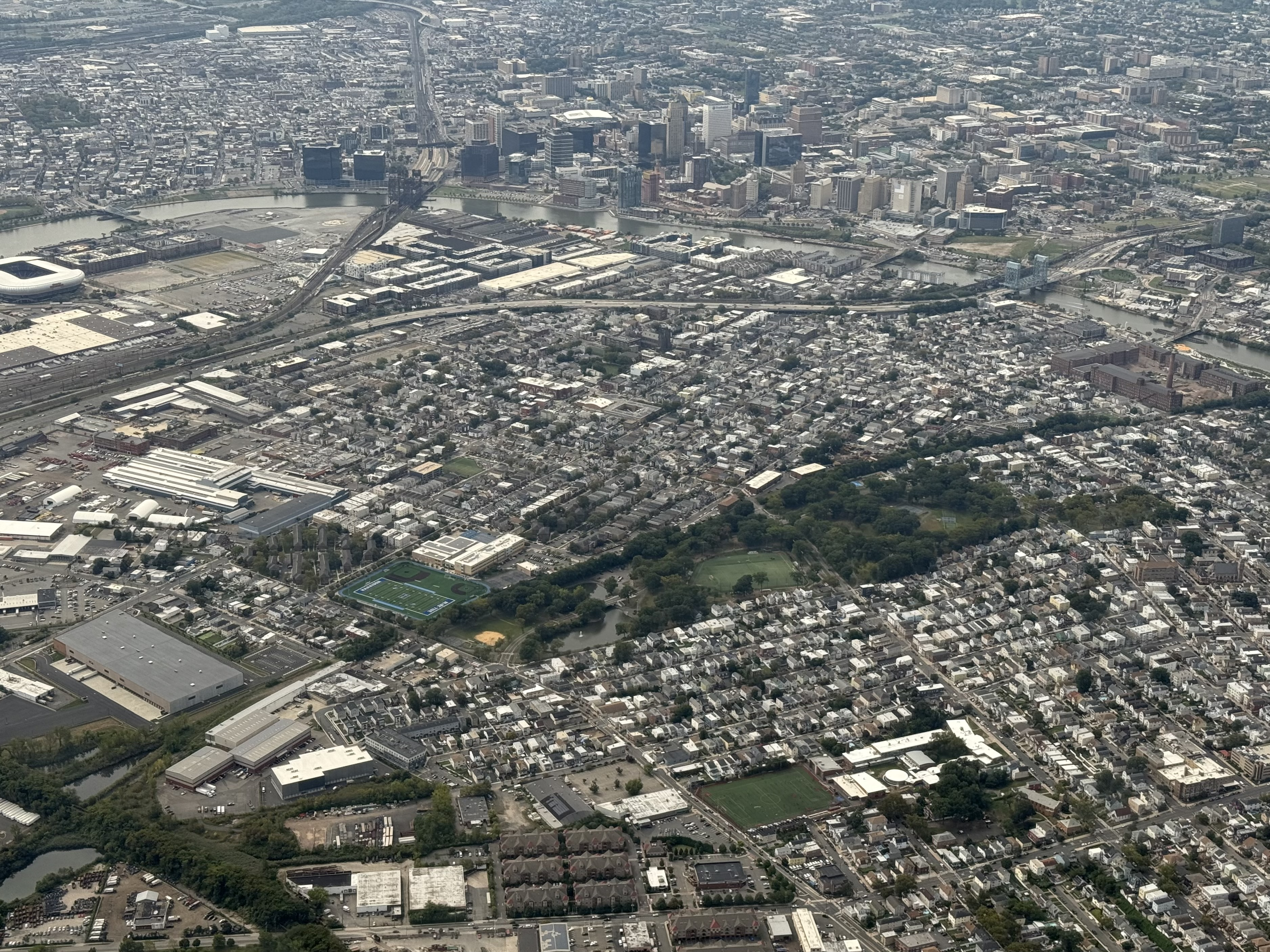
- Aerial view centered on Harrison; Newark's skyline is prominent in the background

- Seal
- Motto: "Beehive of Industry"
- Interactive map of Harrison, New Jersey
- Location in Hudson County Location in New Jersey Location in the United States
- Coordinates: 40.742978°N 74.152911°W
- Country: United States
- State: New Jersey
- County: Hudson
- Incorporated: April 13, 1840 (as township)
- Reincorporated: March 25, 1869 (as town)
- Named for: William Henry Harrison

Government
  - Type: Town
  - Body: Town Council
  - Mayor: James A. Fife (D, term ends December 31, 2026)
  - Municipal clerk: Paul J. Zarbetski

Area
  - Total: 1.33 sq mi (3.44 km^{2})
  - Land: 1.21 sq mi (3.14 km^{2})
  - Water: 0.12 sq mi (0.30 km^{2}) 8.72%
  - Rank: 466th of 565 in state 8th of 12 in county
- Elevation: 20 ft (6.1 m)

Population (2020)
  - Total: 19,450
  - Estimate (2024): 22,182
  - Rank: 142nd of 565 in state 9th of 12 in county
  - Density: 16,061.1/sq mi (6,201.2/km^{2})
  - Rank: 15th of 565 in state 8th of 12 in county
- Time zone: UTC−05:00 (Eastern (EST))
  - Summer (DST): UTC−04:00 (Eastern (EDT))
- ZIP Code: 07029
- Area code: 973
- FIPS code: 3401730210
- GNIS feature ID: 0885245
- Website: townofharrison.com

Harrison is a town in the western part of Hudson County in the U.S. state of New Jersey. It is part of the New York metropolitan area. It is a suburb of the neighboring city of Newark, and is located 8 miles (13 km) from New York City. Once considered "the beehive of industry", the town is undergoing a residential and economic renewal, particularly along the Passaic River.

As of the 2020 United States census, the town's population was 19,450, an increase of 5,830 (+42.8%) from the 2010 census count of 13,620, which in turn reflected a decrease of 804 (−5.6%) from the 14,424 counted in the 2000 census. The Population Estimates Program calculated a population of 22,182 for 2024.

== History ==
=== Colonial era to 19th century ===
The area that is now Harrison was the southernmost part of the 15,308-acre (23.919 sq mi; 61.95 km^{2}) land grant awarded to William Sandford in 1668. When that grant was divided in 1671 between Sandford and his uncle, Nathaniel Kingsland of Barbados, Sandford's 5,000-acre (2,000 ha) share included Harrison. While Sandford and his family established a plantation on the northern portion of his tract, there is no evidence they developed any significant part of Harrison. Upon his death in 1691, Sandford's land passed to his wife, Sarah Sandford (née Whartman). Upon her death c. 1719, she passed most of the land, including Harrison, to her son William (c. 1670–1733). In 1729, William transferred the southern parts of his upland to three of his sons, John, Robert and Peter, each receiving a 300-acre (120 ha) lot that included a portion of Harrison's upland. John and Robert sold their lots to members of the Schuyler family in 1733 and 1736, respectively, and migrated westward, John to Newark and Robert to Pine Brook. The disposition of Peter's lot is not known, but no further record of him is found in or near Harrison.

A road to the Hudson Waterfront was completed in 1750, named for Douwe's Ferry which it met at its eastern end to cross the Hackensack River. In 1790 the state legislature decided that "public good would be served by a 64-foot road from Paulus Hook to Newark Courthouse". By 1795, a bridge over the Hackensack 950 feet (290 m) long and another over the Passaic 492 feet (150 m) long (at the site of the Bridge Street Bridge) were built creating an uninterrupted toll road connection. It is now known as the Newark-Jersey City Turnpike.

In 1826, the New Jersey Legislature formed Lodi Township from the southern portion of New Barbadoes Neck in Bergen County. Since Lodi Township was part of Bergen County, matters dealing with the county government and courts had to be taken to Hackensack.

In 1840, the inhabitants of Lodi Township joined with present-day Secaucus, Bayonne, Jersey City, Hoboken, Weehawken, and Union City and petitioned for the creation of a new county due to the great distance which the petitioners had to travel to reach the county seat in Hackensack. This appeal resulted in the creation of Hudson County and the first mention of Harrison occurs in the law which was passed on April 13, 1840. Harrison Township was thereby established.

The first committee meeting of the Township of Harrison was held on April 16, 1840, and it is widely accepted that Harrison was named for President William Henry Harrison, who was elected that year.

=== 19th century to present ===
Union Township (now Lyndhurst) was created as of February 19, 1852, from portions of the township and became part of Bergen County.

General N. N. Halstead succeeded in getting the necessary laws passed in Trenton and on April 8, 1867, Kearny became a separate Township from land that was a part of Harrison, which included East Newark at the time; East Newark later seceded from Kearny, establishing their own Borough. On March 25, 1869, Harrison town was incorporated, replacing the township.

While campaigning for re-election in 1912, President William Howard Taft told residents gathered for a rally that "you have reason to be proud of this Hive of Industry", from which was coined the town's motto, "The Beehive of Industry", which is still used today.

The town's proximity to rail lines and a large waterfront made Harrison favorably situated for trade. Some of the industries which called Harrison home included the Edison Lamp Works, Worthington Pump and Machinery, the RCA Company, Crucible Steel Company, Otis Elevator, Hartz Mountain, Remco Industries and Hyatt Roller Bearing.

As the U.S. moved into the 20th century, these facilities played a major role in the development of new products for both the private and public sector, peaking during World War II. The small town of about only 14,000 residents had more than 90,000 workers commuting into it on a daily basis. In the 21st century the town is undergoing a transformation from a manufacturing center to a residential and service sector town.

== Geography ==
According to the U.S. Census Bureau, the town had a total area of 1.33 square miles (3.44 km^{2}), including 1.21 square miles (3.14 km^{2}) of land and 0.12 square miles (0.30 km^{2}) of water (8.72%). Unincorporated communities located partially or completely within Harrison include Manhattan Transfer.

The town borders the municipalities of East Newark and Kearny in Hudson County; and Newark across the Passaic River in Essex County.

=== Climate ===
Climate data for Harrison, New Jersey (1991–2020)
Month	Jan	Feb	Mar	Apr	May	Jun	Jul	Aug	Sep	Oct	Nov	Dec	Year
Mean daily maximum °F (°C)	39.4 (4.1)	42.3 (5.7)	49.9 (9.9)	61.8 (16.6)	72.1 (22.3)	81.5 (27.5)	86.8 (30.4)	84.6 (29.2)	77.5 (25.3)	65.6 (18.7)	54.2 (12.3)	44.0 (6.7)	63.3 (17.4)
Daily mean °F (°C)	32.1 (0.1)	34.2 (1.2)	41.3 (5.2)	52.4 (11.3)	62.8 (17.1)	72.4 (22.4)	77.9 (25.5)	75.8 (24.3)	68.8 (20.4)	56.6 (13.7)	46.1 (7.8)	37.3 (2.9)	54.8 (12.7)
Mean daily minimum °F (°C)	24.9 (−3.9)	26.1 (−3.3)	32.7 (0.4)	43.1 (6.2)	53.5 (11.9)	63.3 (17.4)	68.9 (20.5)	67.0 (19.4)	60.1 (15.6)	47.7 (8.7)	38.0 (3.3)	30.5 (−0.8)	46.3 (8.0)
Average precipitation inches (mm)	3.66 (93)	3.26 (83)	4.30 (109)	4.07 (103)	4.36 (111)	4.87 (124)	4.81 (122)	4.38 (111)	4.33 (110)	4.15 (105)	3.65 (93)	4.58 (116)	50.42 (1,280)
Average snowfall inches (cm)	8.0 (20)	8.4 (21)	4.7 (12)	0.7 (1.8)	0.0 (0.0)	0.0 (0.0)	0.0 (0.0)	0.0 (0.0)	0.0 (0.0)	0.2 (0.51)	0.3 (0.76)	5.9 (15)	28.2 (71.07)
Source: NOAA

== Demographics ==
Historical population
Census	Pop.	Note	%±
1850	1,344		—
1860	2,556		90.2%
1870	4,129		61.5%
1880	6,898		67.1%
1890	8,328		20.7%
1900	10,596		27.2%
1910	14,498		36.8%
1920	15,721		8.4%
1930	15,601		−0.8%
1940	14,171		−9.2%
1950	13,490		−4.8%
1960	11,743		−13.0%
1970	11,811		0.6%
1980	12,242		3.6%
1990	13,425		9.7%
2000	14,424		7.4%
2010	13,620		−5.6%
2020	19,450		42.8%
2024 (est.)	22,182	▲	14.0%
Population sources: 1850–1920; 1850–1900 1850–1870; 1850 1870 1880–1890; 1890–1910 1870–1930; 1940–2000 2000; 2010 2020

=== Racial and ethnic composition ===
Harrison town, New Jersey – Racial and ethnic composition Note: the US Census treats Hispanic/Latino as an ethnic category. This table excludes Latinos from the racial categories and assigns them to a separate category. Hispanics/Latinos may be of any race.
Race / Ethnicity (NH = Non-Hispanic)	Pop 2000	Pop 2010	Pop 2020	% 2000	% 2010	% 2020
White alone (NH)	6,756	4,818	4,690	46.84%	35.37%	24.11%
Black or African American alone (NH)	87	173	722	0.60%	1.27%	3.71%
Native American or Alaska Native alone (NH)	18	6	18	0.12%	0.04%	0.09%
Asian alone (NH)	1,700	2,198	4,946	11.79%	16.14%	25.43%
Native Hawaiian or Pacific Islander alone (NH)	4	2	0	0.03%	0.01%	0.00%
Other race alone (NH)	202	234	529	1.40%	1.72%	2.72%
Mixed race or Multiracial (NH)	324	172	786	2.25%	1.26%	4.04%
Hispanic or Latino (any race)	5,333	6,017	7,759	36.97%	44.18%	39.89%
Total	14,424	13,620	19,450	100.00%	100.00%	100.00%

=== 2020 census ===
As of the 2020 census, Harrison had a population of 19,450. The population density was 16,061.1 persons per square mile.

The median age was 32.1 years. Of residents, 17.2% were under the age of 18 and 9.2% were 65 years of age or older. For every 100 females, there were 107.7 males, and for every 100 females age 18 and over there were 107.8 males age 18 and over.

100.0% of residents lived in urban areas, while 0.0% lived in rural areas.

There were 8,111 households in Harrison, of which 26.0% had children under the age of 18 living in them. Of all households, 36.7% were married-couple households, 27.1% were households with a male householder and no spouse or partner present, and 27.1% were households with a female householder and no spouse or partner present. About 30.2% of all households were made up of individuals and 5.0% had someone living alone who was 65 years of age or older.

There were 8,594 housing units, of which 5.6% were vacant. The homeowner vacancy rate was 0.8% and the rental vacancy rate was 4.8%.

=== Income and poverty ===
The median household income for Harrison was $68,494.00.

=== 2010 census ===
The 2010 United States census counted 13,620 people, 4,869 households, and 3,262 families in the town. The population density was 11,319.3 per square mile (4,370.4/km^{2}). There were 5,228 housing units at an average density of 4,344.9 per square mile (1,677.6/km^{2}). The racial makeup was 58.30% (7,941) White, 2.18% (297) Black or African American, 0.56% (76) Native American, 16.28% (2,217) Asian, 0.01% (2) Pacific Islander, 18.48% (2,517) from other races, and 4.19% (570) from two or more races. Hispanic or Latino of any race were 44.18% (6,017) of the population.

Of the 4,869 households, 31.8% had children under the age of 18; 44.2% were married couples living together; 15.0% had a female householder with no husband present and 33.0% were non-families. Of all households, 22.1% were made up of individuals and 7.8% had someone living alone who was 65 years of age or older. The average household size was 2.80 and the average family size was 3.23.

20.8% of the population were under the age of 18, 10.9% from 18 to 24, 35.0% from 25 to 44, 24.0% from 45 to 64, and 9.3% who were 65 years of age or older. The median age was 34.0 years. For every 100 females, the population had 105.7 males. For every 100 females ages 18 and older there were 105.7 males.

=== 2000 census ===
As of the 2000 United States census there were 14,424 people, 5,136 households, and 3,636 families residing in the town. The population density was 11,811.1 inhabitants per square mile (4,560.3/km^{2}). There were 5,254 housing units at an average density of 4,302.2 per square mile (1,661.1/km^{2}). The racial makeup of the town was 66.10% White, 0.98% African American, 0.40% Native American, 11.89% Asian, 0.03% Pacific Islander, 15.96% from other races, and 4.65% from two or more races. Hispanic or Latino of any race were 36.97% of the population.

As of the 2000 census, 7.22% of Harrison's residents identified themselves as being of Chinese ancestry. This was the fifth-highest percentage of people with Chinese ancestry in any place in New Jersey with 1,000 or more residents identifying their ancestry.

There were 5,136 households, out of which 33.7% had children under the age of 18 living with them, 49.8% were married couples living together, 13.9% had a female householder with no husband present, and 29.2% were non-families. 22.5% of all households were made up of individuals, and 8.7% had someone living alone who was 65 years of age or older. The average household size was 2.81 and the average family size was 3.27.

In the town, the population was spread out, with 21.5% under the age of 18, 10.6% from 18 to 24, 36.8% from 25 to 44, 20.9% from 45 to 64, and 10.3% who were 65 years of age or older. The median age was 34 years. For every 100 females, there were 104.0 males. For every 100 females age 18 and over, there were 101.2 males.

The median income for a household in the town was $41,350, and the median income for a family was $48,489. Males had a median income of $33,069 versus $26,858 for females. The per capita income for the town was $18,490. About 10.1% of families and 12.4% of the population were below the poverty line, including 15.5% of those under age 18 and 10.8% of those age 65 or over.

== Government ==
=== Local government ===
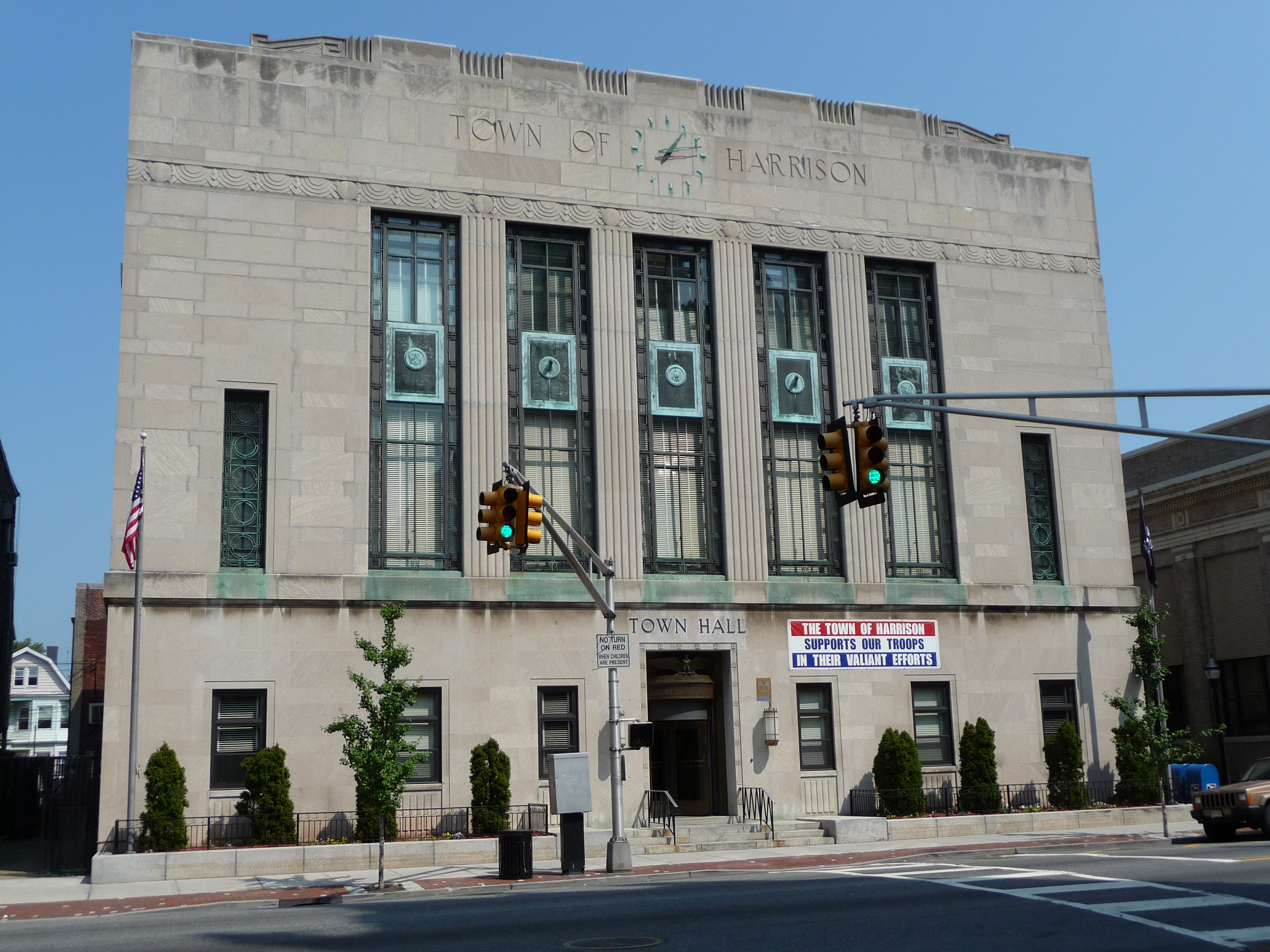
Town Hall

Harrison is governed under the Town form of New Jersey municipal government, one of 9 municipalities (of the 564) statewide that use this form. The governing body is comprised of the mayor and Town Council, all of whom are elected on a partisan basis as part of the November general elections. A mayor is elected directly by the voters at-large to a four-year term of office. The Town Council includes eight members who are elected to serve four-year terms on a staggered basis, with one seat from each of the town's four wards up for vote one year, one seat from each of the four wards up the next year and then two years with no elections.

The town is divided into four electoral wards, with each ward represented by two council members, with a total of eight council members on the Town Council. Each ward is divided into three districts (except for the 1st Ward, which has two districts), for a total of 11 electoral districts. The head of the government is the mayor. The mayor chairs the Town Council and heads the municipal government. The Mayor may both vote on legislation before the council and veto ordinances. The Mayor's veto can be overruled by ¾ of the Town Council voting to overrule the veto. Town Council meetings are held on the first Tuesday of the month at 7:00 pm (except in July and August, when no meetings are held, at the call of the chairman), in Council Chambers, which is located on the second floor of the Town Hall at 318 Harrison Avenue. Public Caucus Meetings are held at 6:30 pm.

As of 2025, the Mayor of Harrison is Democrat James A. Fife, who is serving a term of office ending December 31, 2022. Members of the Harrison Town Council are Laurence Bennett (D, 2026; 3rd Ward), Maria Camano (D, 2027; 1st Ward), James P. Doran (D, 2026; 4th Ward), Jesus Huaranga (D, 2026; 1st Ward), Ellen Mendoza (D, 2026; 2nd Ward), Delfim Sarabando (D, 2027; 3rd Ward) and Eleanor Villalta (D, 2027; 2nd Ward), with a vacant 4th Ward seat expiring in 2027.

In November 2024, Michael Dolaghan resigned from his 4th Ward seat that expires in 2027. As no one was appointed by council to fill the vacancy, the seat will remain vacant until the November 2025 general election, when the voters will choose a candidate to serve the balance of the term

Harrison had one of the longest-serving mayors in United States history, Frank E. Rodgers, who was first elected in 1946, defeating incumbent Frederick J. Gassert who had served for 16 years, and served for 48 years, from 1947 to 1995, being elected to 24 two-year terms. He also served two terms in the New Jersey State Senate, from 1978 to 1984.

While serving a term scheduled to end on December 31, 2014, longtime Mayor Raymond McDonough died on February 12, 2014, after suffering a heart attack at town hall. Later that month, the town council selected James Fife, a former Harrison High School principal, to complete term of McDonough's seat as mayor, which he had held since 1995.

In 2018, the town had an average property tax bill of $11,109, the highest in the county, compared to an average bill of $8,767 statewide.

In February 2022, the Town Council selected Delfim Sarabando from a list of three candidates nominated by the Democratic municipal committee to fille the Ward 3 council seat expiring in December 2023 that had been held by Francisco Nascimento until he stepped down from office.

=== Federal, state, and county representation ===
Harrison is located in the 8th Congressional District and is part of New Jersey's 29th state legislative district.

For the 119th United States Congress, New Jersey's 8th congressional district is represented by Rob Menendez (D, Jersey City). New Jersey is represented in the United States Senate by Democrats Cory Booker (Newark, term ends 2027) and Andy Kim (Moorestown, term ends 2031).

For the 2026–2027 session, the 29th legislative district of the New Jersey Legislature is represented in the State Senate by Teresa Ruiz (D, Newark) and in the General Assembly by Eliana Pintor Marin (D, Newark) and Shanique Speight (D, Newark).

Hudson County is governed by the directly elected Hudson County Executive and by a Board of County Commissioners, which serves as the county's legislative body. As of 2025, Hudson County's Hudson County Executive is Craig Guy (D, Jersey City), whose term of office expires December 31, 2027. Hudson County's Commissioners are Kenneth Kopacz (D, District 1 - Bayonne and parts of Jersey City; 2026, Bayonne), William O'Dea (D, District 2 - Western Jersey City; 2026, Jersey City), Vice Chair Jerry Walker (D, District 3 - South Eastern Jersey City Yraida Aponte-Lipski (D, District 4 - North Eastern Jersey City; 2026, Jersey City), Chair Anthony L. Romano Jr. (D, District 5 - Hoboken and parts of Jersey City; 2026, Hoboken), Fanny J. Cedeño (D, District 6 - Union City; 2026, Union City), Caridad Rodriguez (D, District 7 - Weehawken, West New York, and Gutenberg; 2026, West New York), Robert Bascelice (D, District 8 - West New York, North Bergen, Secaucus; 2026, North Bergen) and Albert J. Cifelli (D, District 9 - Secaucus, Kearny, East Newark, Harrison; 2026, Harrison)

Hudson County's constitutional officers are County Clerk E. Junior Maldonado (D, Jersey City, 2027), Register Jeffrey Dublin (D, Jersey City, 2026) Sheriff Frank X. Schillari (R, Jersey City, 2025) and Surrogate Tilo E. Rivas (D, Jersey City, 2029)

=== Politics ===
As of March 2011, there were a total of 5,454 registered voters in Harrison, of which 3,207 (58.8%) were registered as Democrats, 312 (5.7%) were registered as Republicans and 1,934 (35.5%) were registered as Unaffiliated. There was one voter registered to another party.

Gubernatorial election results for Harrison
Year	Republican		Democratic		Third party(ies)	
Year	No.	%	No.	%	No.	%
2025	782	24.74%	2,340	74.03%	39	1.23%
2021	676	32.70%	1,373	66.42%	18	0.87%
2017	335	18.19%	1,477	80.18%	30	1.63%
2013	896	53.18%	762	45.22%	27	1.60%
2009	554	25.03%	1,542	69.68%	117	5.29%
2005	466	21.50%	1,614	74.48%	87	4.01%

In the 2012 presidential election, Democrat Barack Obama received 78.4% of the vote (2,699 cast), ahead of Republican Mitt Romney with 20.0% (689 votes), and other candidates with 1.6% (54 votes), among the 3,473 ballots cast by the town's 5,940 registered voters (31 ballots were spoiled), for a turnout of 58.5%. In the 2008 presidential election, Democrat Barack Obama received 68.0% of the vote (2,347 cast), ahead of Republican John McCain with 30.0% (1,036 votes) and other candidates with 1.1% (38 votes), among the 3,453 ballots cast by the town's 5,827 registered voters, for a turnout of 59.3%. In the 2004 presidential election, Democrat John Kerry received 64.8% of the vote (2,142 ballots cast), outpolling Republican George W. Bush with 34.1% (1,128 votes) and other candidates with 0.3% (16 votes), among the 3,306 ballots cast by the town's 5,411 registered voters, for a turnout percentage of 61.1.

Presidential Elections Results
Year	Republican	Democratic	Third Parties
2024	39.6% 1,881	56.9% 2,705	3.5% 144
2020	28.9% 1,469	68.2% 3,460	2.9% 61
2016	27.2% 1,022	69.1% 2,596	3.0% 114
2012	20.0% 689	78.4% 2,699	1.6% 54
2008	30.0% 1,036	68.0% 2,347	1.1% 38
2004	34.1% 1,128	64.8% 2,142	0.3% 16

In the 2013 gubernatorial election, Republican Chris Christie received 53.2% of the vote (896 cast), ahead of Democrat Barbara Buono with 45.2% (762 votes), and other candidates with 1.6% (27 votes), among the 1,718 ballots cast by the town's 6,032 registered voters (33 ballots were spoiled), for a turnout of 28.5%. In the 2009 gubernatorial election, Democrat Jon Corzine received 69.0% of the vote (1,542 ballots cast), ahead of Republican Chris Christie with 24.8% (554 votes), Independent Chris Daggett with 3.9% (87 votes) and other candidates with 1.3% (30 votes), among the 2,234 ballots cast by the town's 5,225 registered voters, yielding a 42.8% turnout.

United States Senate election results for Harrison1
Year	Republican		Democratic		Third party(ies)	
Year	No.	%	No.	%	No.	%
2024	1,421	33.81%	2,599	61.84%	183	4.35%
2018	706	22.31%	2,357	74.49%	101	3.19%
2012	520	17.05%	2,458	80.59%	72	2.36%
2006	567	22.13%	1,864	72.76%	131	5.11%

United States Senate election results for Harrison2
Year	Republican		Democratic		Third party(ies)	
Year	No.	%	No.	%	No.	%
2020	1,202	25.17%	3,426	71.73%	148	3.10%
2014	382	20.06%	1,469	77.15%	53	2.78%
2013	282	25.54%	804	72.83%	18	1.63%
2008	688	25.34%	1,943	71.57%	84	3.09%

== Emergency services ==
=== Police ===
In the 1870s, the township was patrolled by Phillip Mulligan and four constables. In 1878, Mulligan was eventually appointed "Police Justice" and in 1885, an ordinance was passed to regulate and establish a police department. In 1891, the first police officers were appointed under the 1895 ordinance. Michael Rodgers (father of Mayor Frank E. Rodgers) was among those appointed. He eventually became the first chief of police.

On March 28, 1897, Officer John J. Clark was electrocuted while investigating a downed power line, becoming the first Harrison police officer to die in the line of duty. A plaque at police headquarters is dedicated in his memory.

The Harrison Police Department is presently led by Chief of Police David Strumolo, who was sworn in March 2018. The department currently consists of 39 members, down from a one-time high of 67 officers in the 1990s. The department consists of several divisions; Administrative, Patrol, Detective, Traffic Safety, Street Crimes, and Community Policing. The department participates in National Night Out, and various cultural and civic events, as well as "meet and greets."

The department was among the many Hudson County agencies that responded to the January 2009 crash of Flight 1549, for which they received accolades from the survivors.

The Harrison Police Department is recognized as an "accredited police agency" by the New Jersey Law Enforcement Accreditation Commission and the New Jersey Association of Chiefs of Police.

=== Fire ===
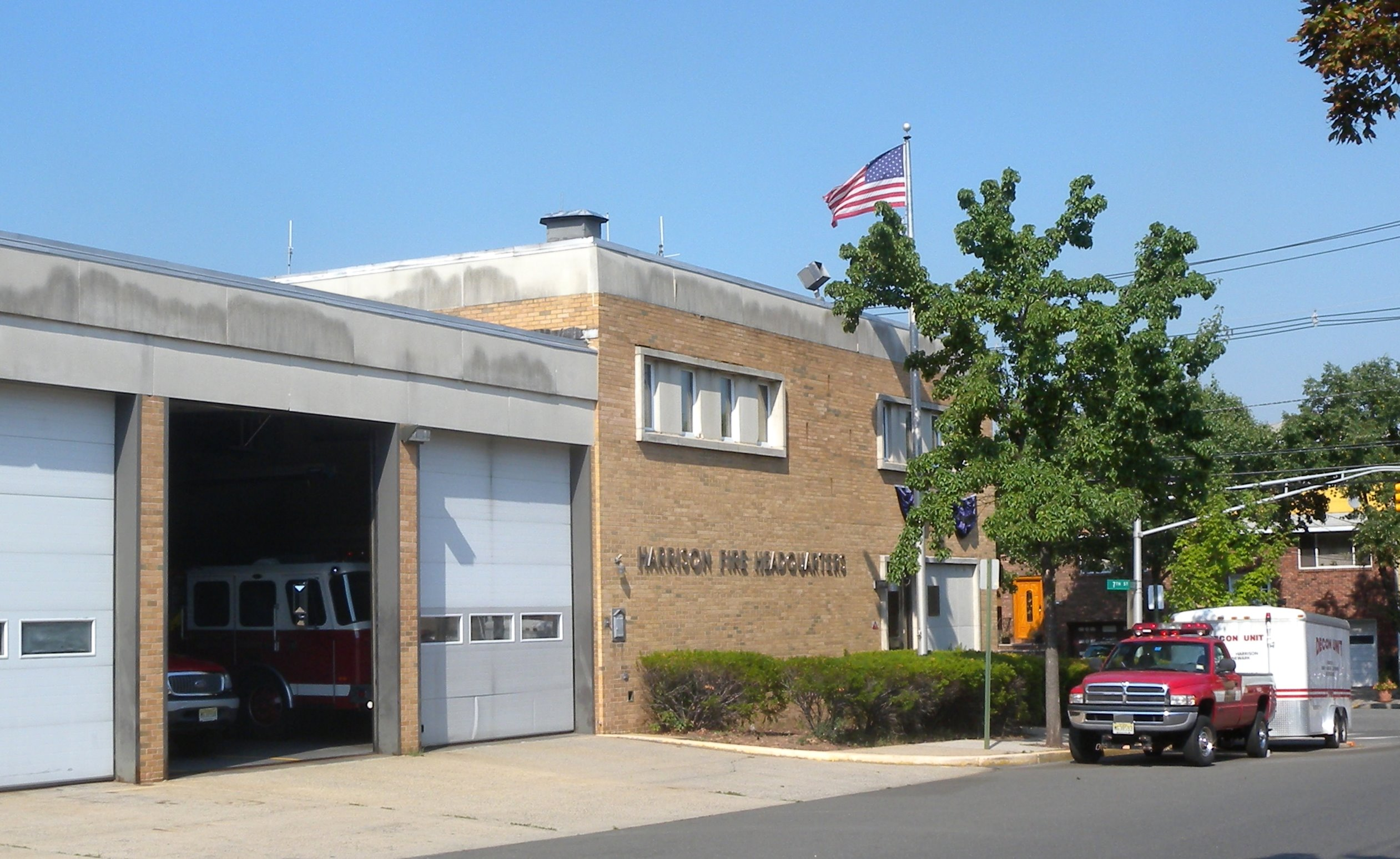
Fire Department headquarters

The Harrison Fire Department operates out of a fire station located at 634 Sussex Street and operates a fire apparatus fleet of three engines, one ladder, and several support units and spares. Due to cutbacks, the HFD usually is able to staff one engine with three members and one ladder with three members and one tour commander on duty. The HFD has a table of organization of 29 firefighters. In April 2013, officials from neighboring municipalities and fire departments expressed their frustration at the stresses placed on their firefighters in covering fires in Harrison. Currently Harrison is staffing two engines and one ladder 24/7.

- Engine 1 (spare) 1994 Emergency-One Sentry 1250/750
- Engine 2 2020 Pierce Enforcer 1500/750
- Engine 3 2006 Emergency-One Typhoon 1500/720/10/20
- Ladder 1 2018 Pierce Arrow 107' Tillered Aerial
- Ladder 2 (spare) 1991 Duplex/LTI 110' Tillered Aerial
- Battalion Chief 2019 Ford Explorer Interceptor •Deputy Chief 2013 Ford Expedition

=== EMS ===
As of January 1, 2014, Monmouth Ocean Hospital Service Corporation (MONOC) EMS provides 9-1-1 ambulance service to the city of Harrison and nearby East Newark. As part of the agreement, MONOC pays a $1,500 monthly fee for its use of the firehouse on Cleveland Avenue that had previously been used by Harrison Emergency Management Services.

== Education ==
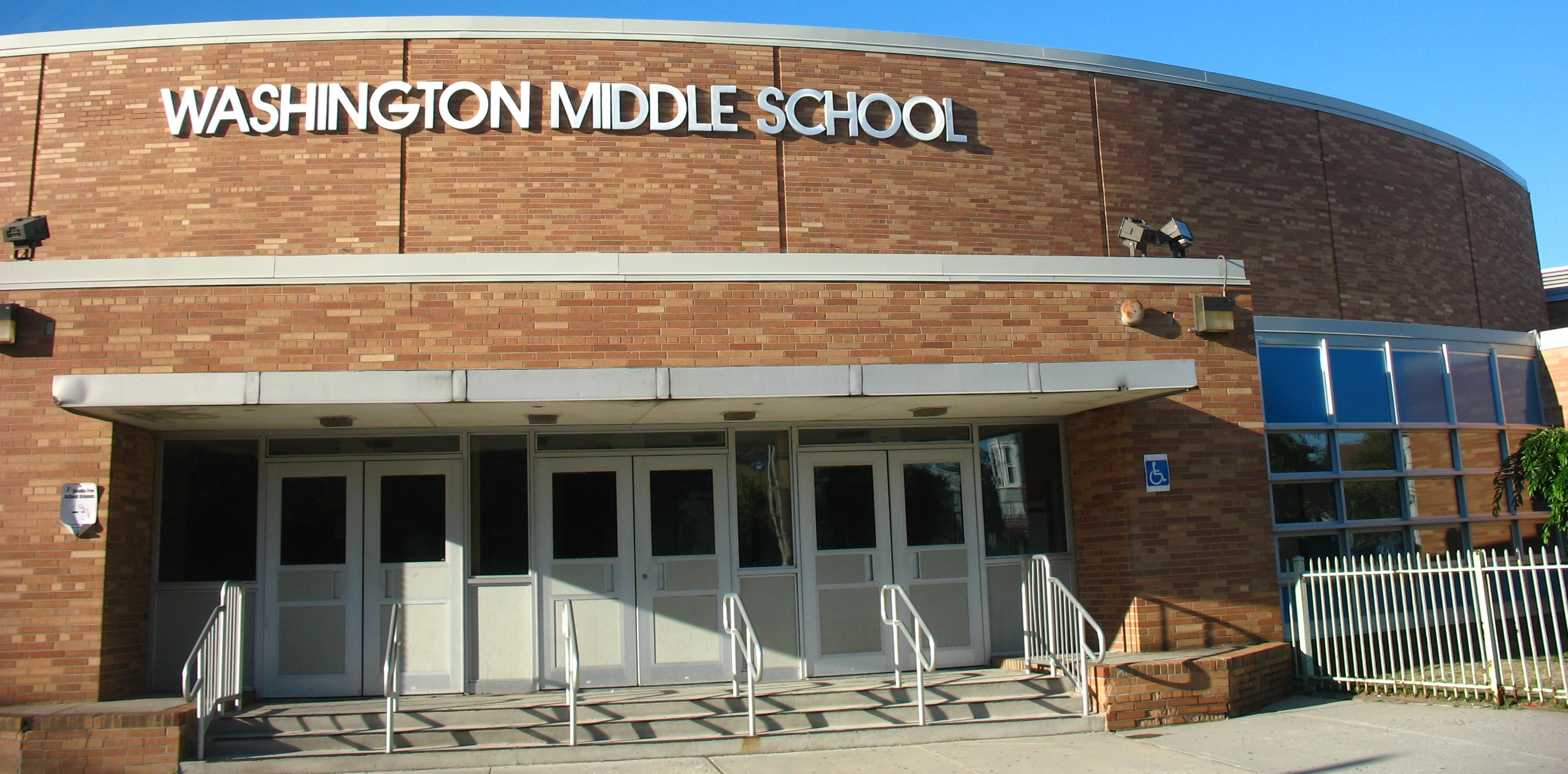
Washington Middle School

The Harrison Public Schools serves students in kindergarten through twelfth grade. The district is one of 31 former Abbott districts statewide that were established pursuant to the decision by the New Jersey Supreme Court in Abbott v. Burke which are now referred to as "SDA Districts" based on the requirement for the state to cover all costs for school building and renovation projects in these districts under the supervision of the New Jersey Schools Development Authority. As of the 2018–19 school year, the district, comprised of four schools, had an enrollment of 2,409 students and 166.5 classroom teachers (on an FTE basis), for a student–teacher ratio of 14.5:1. Schools in the district (with 2018–19 enrollment data from the National Center for Education Statistics) are Harrison Early Childhood Program (grades Pre-K3 and Pre-K4), Lincoln Elementary School with 620 students in grades Pre-K to 3, Hamilton Intermediate School with 307 students in grades 4–5, Washington Middle School with 438 students in grades 6–8, and Harrison High School with 692 students in grades 9–12.

Holy Cross School of the Roman Catholic Archdiocese of Newark operated until 2009, when it merged into Mater Dei Academy in Kearny; the merged school closed in 2012.

== Civic organizations ==
Harrison Lions Club was chartered on July 25, 1951. The Harrison Club is part of Multiple District 16 (New Jersey) which is part of Lions Clubs International (LCI), the world's largest service organization. The club supports and provides financial aid to the district, state, and international sight projects and is also involved in community programs.

== Transportation ==
=== Roads and highways ===
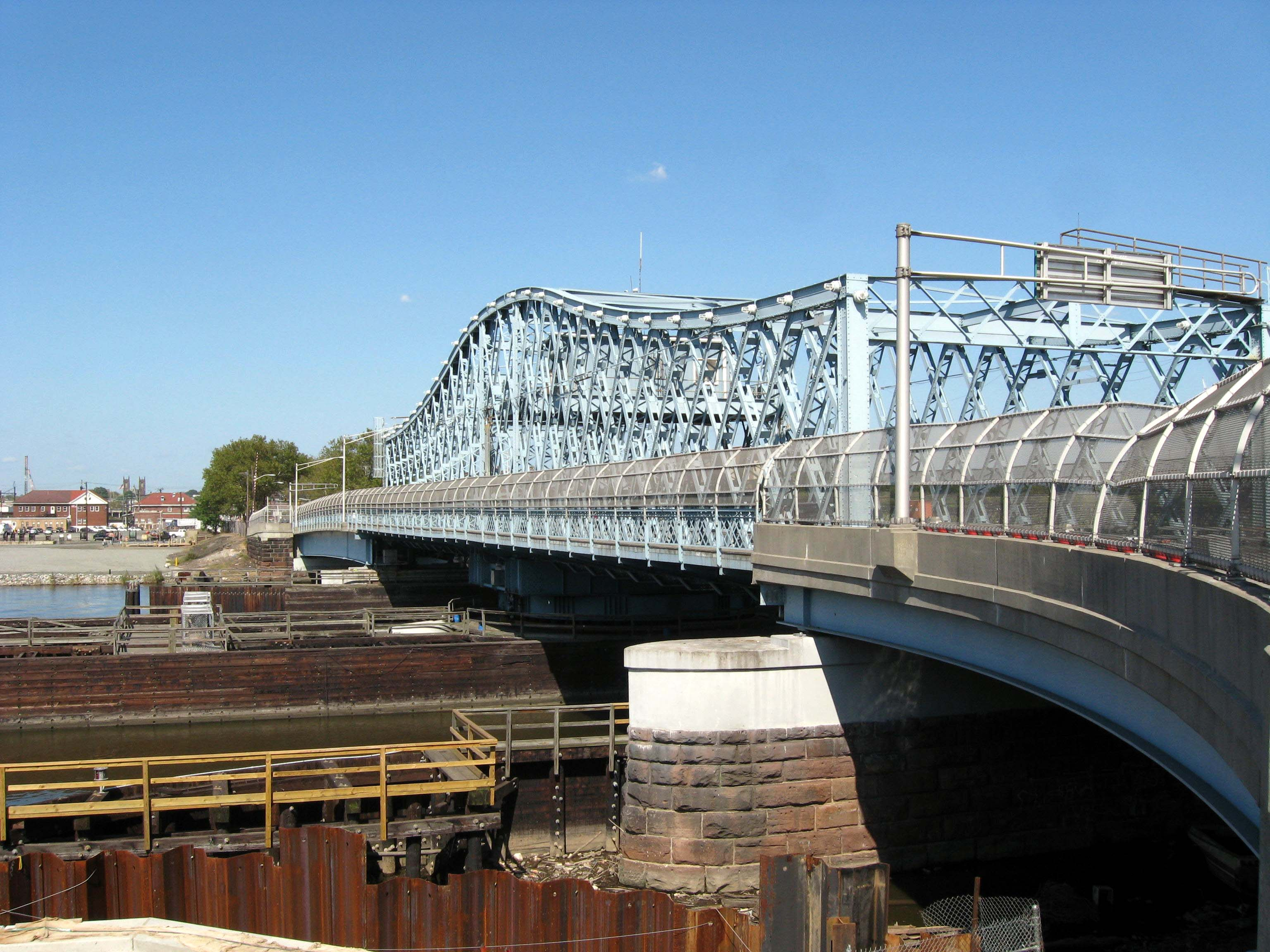
Jackson Street Bridge connects Harrison to the Newark Ironbound

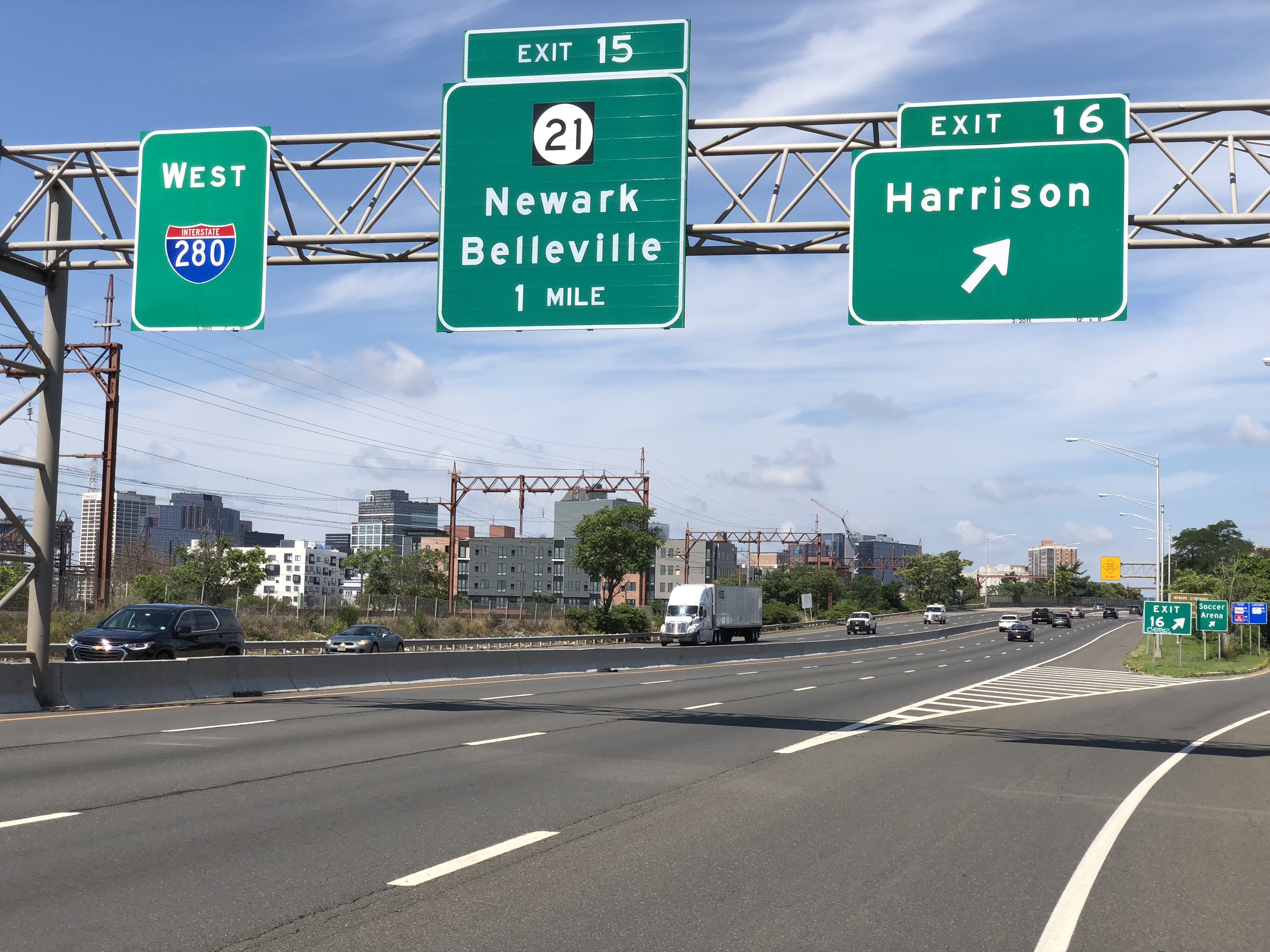
View west along Interstate 280 in Harrison

As of May 2010, the town had a total of 18.15 miles (29.21 km) of roadways, of which 15.23 miles (24.51 km) were maintained by the municipality, 1.57 miles (2.53 km) by Hudson County and 1.35 miles (2.17 km) by the New Jersey Department of Transportation.

Interstate 280 runs through the center of the town. Westward, I-280 leads to Route 21, the Garden State Parkway, and Interstate 80. Eastward, it leads to Route 7 and the New Jersey Turnpike.

Replacement of Interstate 280's partial access in central Harrison with service roads, a new interchange, and an overpass (to improve access to Harrison Avenue, the PATH station, and Sports Illustrated Stadium, and to give north–south passage to local street traffic) is in the planning stages.

=== Public transportation ===
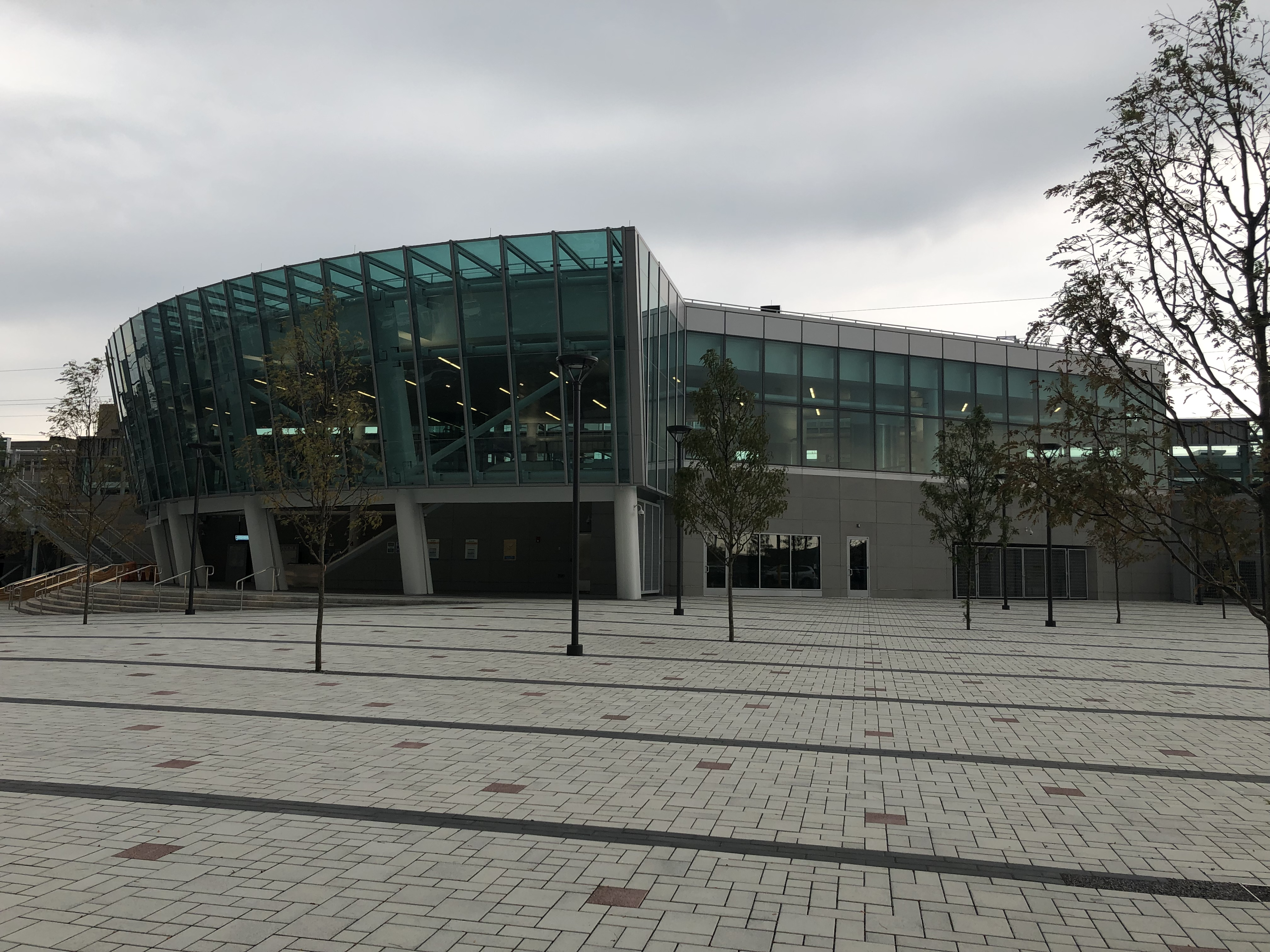
Harrison station

The Harrison station on the PATH rapid transit system offers service to Newark, Jersey City, Hoboken and New York City. The station was built in 1913 and relocated to its present location in 1936. A major reconstruction for the Harrison Station was approved on March 28, 2012, and construction started in January 2013. The completion target, originally scheduled for April 2017, was tentatively moved to 2018; the expansion of the station was completed on June 15, 2019.

The Northeast Corridor, built in the 19th century by the Pennsylvania Railroad and now owned by Amtrak, carries NJ Transit trains, and passes through the city on the same alignment as the PATH. There was a stop on the Northeast Corridor in Harrison, but it was eliminated due to the ease of picking up trains in Newark at Penn Station.

Harrison is served by buses operated by several bus companies. NJ Transit offers service within New Jersey on the 30, 40 routes.

The closest airport in New Jersey with scheduled passenger service is Newark Liberty International Airport, located 4.8 miles (7.7 km) away in Newark and Elizabeth.

== Harrison Waterfront Development Plan ==
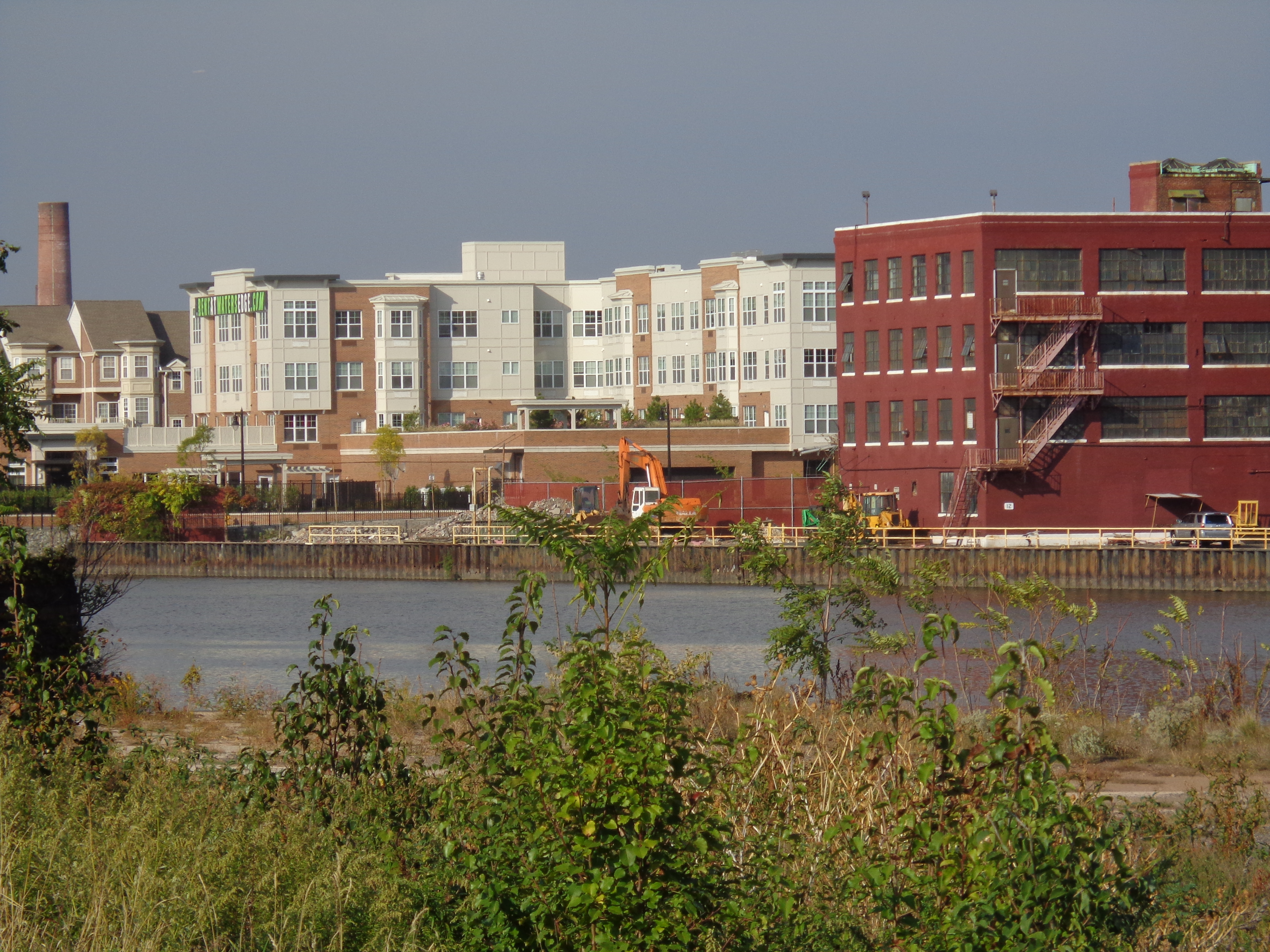
Old and new on the Passaic

The Harrison Waterfront Redevelopment Plan invited developers to submit plans that capitalize on the presence of the Harrison PATH Station and the Passaic River within a 275-acre (1.11 km^{2}) area that covers 35% of the whole town. The Plan seeks to unite the developers' proposals with a design theme that includes motifs from Harrison's industrial, cultural, and environmental history as a means of fostering a new identity for Harrison that provides a variety of mixed-use, transit-oriented, pedestrian-scale development that will make Harrison a regional destination.

== Sports Illustrated Stadium ==
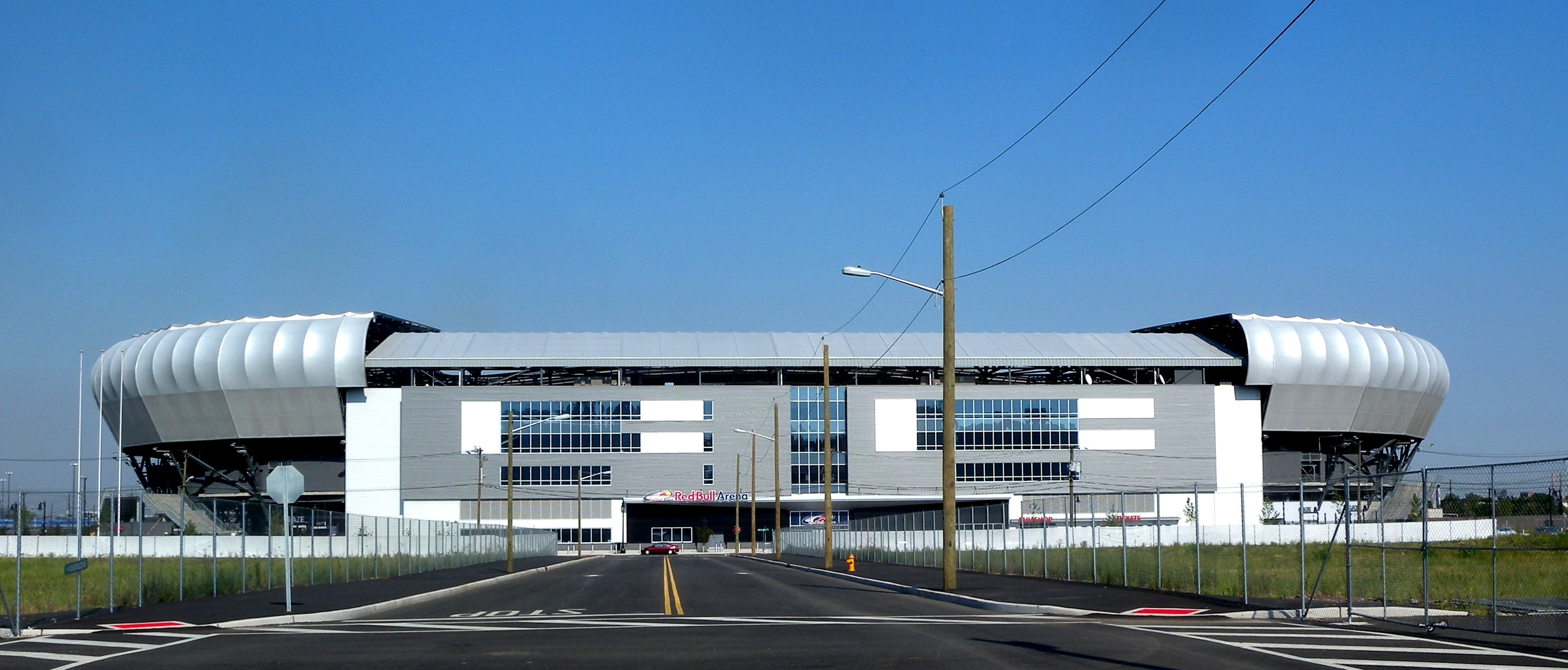
Exterior of Red Bull Arena in 2010. Now known as Sports Illustrated Stadium.

Harrison is the location of Sports Illustrated Stadium, home of the New York Red Bulls of Major League Soccer and Gotham FC of the National Women's Soccer League. After years of construction delays, the stadium opened on March 20, 2010, with an exhibition game against the Brazilian club Santos FC. In 2011, it hosted the 2011 MLS All-Star Game. The soccer-specific stadium (SSS) was constructed at a cost of $200 million and has a capacity of approximately 25,000, with a natural grass field, featuring a full wavy translucent European-style roof that covers all of the seats in the stadium but not the field. The stadium sits alongside the Passaic River with a view of the New York and Newark skyline, and is accessible via public transportation at the PATH train station in Harrison.

Harrison has a long history and reputation as a soccer cultural hotbed centered around the famed Harrison Soccer Courts. The West Hudson County area has been called the "Cradle of American Soccer" and home to historic teams such as Clark O.N.T., West Hudson A.A. and the Kearny Scots dating back to the late 19th and early 20th century. On November 28, 1885, the neighboring town of Kearny hosted the first international soccer match held outside of the United Kingdom between the United States and Canada at Clark Field in the neighborhood that is now East Newark. Harrison Park was located a few blocks northwest of the site of Sports Illustrated Stadium and was the home field of West Hudson A.A. It hosted the American Cup final in 1920 and 1921 and the U.S. Open Cup final in 1918 and 1923.

== Notable people ==
People who were born in, residents of, or otherwise closely associated with Harrison include:

- Angelo M. "Chubby" Cifelli (born 1939), singer, songwriter, musician. who had a 1967 hit with "Tell it to the Rain" by Frankie Valli & The Four Seasons
- Dave D'Errico (born 1952), former professional soccer player
- Samuel Taylor Darling (1872–1925), pathologist and bacteriologist
- Sam Dente (1922–2002), major league baseball shortstop from 1947 to 1955
- Bhairavi Desai, founding member of the Taxi Workers Alliance in New York
- Jack Dunleavy (1879–1944), Major League Baseball outfielder and pitcher from 1903 to 1905
- Bernard Epstein (1920–2005), mathematician and physicist who wrote several widely used textbooks on mathematics
- Robert Firth (1918–1984), United States federal judge
- Tom Florie (1897–1966), soccer forward who played in both the first and second American Soccer Leagues, winning two National Challenge Cup titles and was inducted into the U.S. National Soccer Hall of Fame in 1986
- Daisy Fuentes (born 1966), model, actress and former MTV VJ
- Joe Gardi (c. 1939–2010), head football coach at Hofstra University for 16 seasons, from 1990 to 2005, where he compiled a record of 119–62–2
- Kevin Gilmore (1949–1970), college football player who was a member of the 1970 Marshall University football team and died in the crash of Southern Airways Flight 932. His body was not identified and his presumed remains are buried with five other unidentified players in the Springhill Cemetery
- Fred A. Hartley Jr. (1902–1969), served ten terms in the United States House of Representatives where he represented the New Jersey's 8th and New Jersey's 10th congressional districts
- Marty Kavanagh (1891–1960), Major League Baseball infielder from 1914 to 1918
- Beverly Kenney (1932–1960), jazz singer who recorded six albums before her suicide
- Ray Lucas (born 1972), former NFL quarterback who played for the New York Jets, among other teams
- Edward F. McDonald (1844–1926), represented New Jersey's 7th congressional district from 1895 to 1899
- Patrick "Paddy" McGuigan (c. 1860–1938), bare-knuckle boxer who was inducted into the New Jersey Boxing Hall of Fame
- Matt Pinfield (born 1961), music personality and TV host, best known for being a video deejay on MTV and VH1
- Henry Pogorzelski (1922–2015), mathematician best known for his work on Goldbach's conjecture, the still-unsolved problem of whether every even number can be represented as a sum of two prime numbers
- Tab Ramos (born 1966), retired soccer midfielder
- Frank E. Rodgers (1909–2000), politician who as Mayor of Harrison for 48 years from 1946 to 1995, having been elected to 24 consecutive two-year terms in office and placing him among the longest-serving mayors in U.S. history
- Fred Shields (1912–1985), soccer player for the United States at the 1936 Summer Olympics in Berlin who was elected to the National Soccer Hall of Fame in 1968
- Omar Sowe (born 2000), soccer player who plays as a forward for New York Red Bulls II in the USL Championship
- Joe Stripp (1903–1989), Major League Baseball third baseman from 1928 to 1938
- Aloysius Michael Sullivan (1896-1980), poet, magazine editor, radio announcer and author, best known for his collection of poems Songs of the Musconetcong
- Bill Summers (1895–1966), umpire in Major League Baseball who worked in the American League from 1933 to 1959
- George Tintle (1892–1975), soccer goalie elected to the National Soccer Hall of Fame in 1952
