= Klondike (boxer) =

American actor and prizefighter (1878–1949

Klondike Haynes
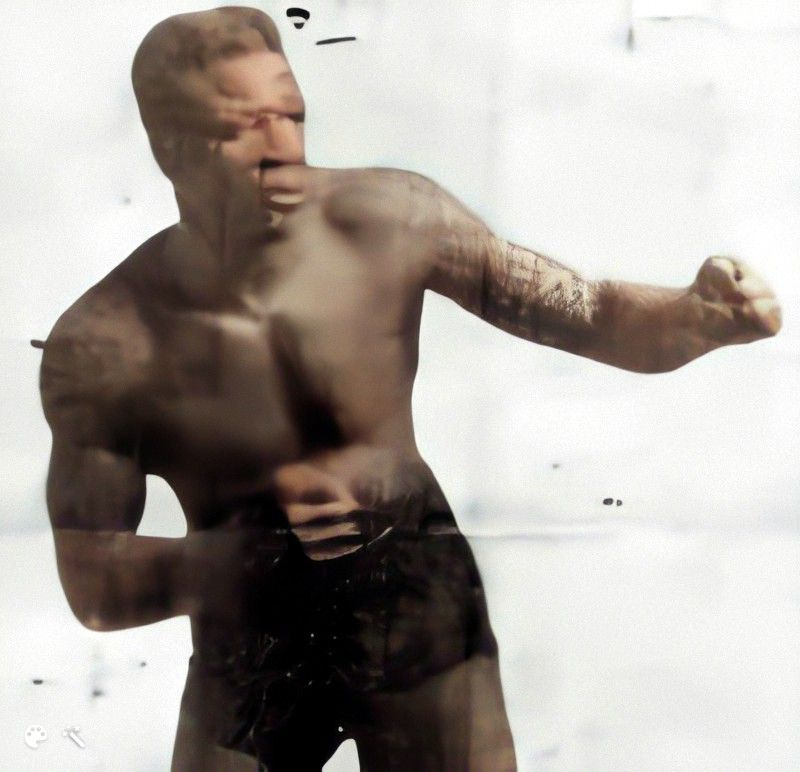
- Klondike Haynes before fighting for Black Heavyweight Championship against Frank Childs in 1899

Personal information
- Nickname: The Black Hercules
- Nationality: American
- Born: January 1, 1878
- Died: February 3, 1949
- Height: 6 ft 0 in (1.83 m)
- Weight: Heavyweight

Boxing career

Boxing record
- Total fights: 38
- Wins: 24
- Win by KO: 14
- Losses: 11
- Draws: 3

Klondike Haynes (1 January 1878 – 3 February 1949) was an African American boxer billed as "The Black Hercules" who declared himself the black heavyweight champion (not to be confused with the World Colored Heavyweight Championship, which he officially fought for just once and unofficially another time). Born John Haines or John W. Haynes, the 6 foot (1,83m) tall Klondike fought out of Chicago as a heavyweight at a weight of 190–200 pounds (86–91 kg) from 1898 to 1911. He took the nickname because he was supposed to be a great find (evoking the Klondike Gold Rush).

He made his professional boxing debut against future two-time colored heavyweight champ Frank Childs on 8 January 1898 at Chicago's 2nd Regiment Armory (a fight erroneously credited to lightweight Frank Young Haines). He was knocked out by Childs. Later that month, on 29 January, Childs won the world colored heavyweight title from Bob Armstrong and his first defense of the title was against Klondike on February 26. Childs won by a technical knockout when the referee stopped the fight in the fourth round of the scheduled six-round bout.

They fought again four times, as African American boxers were forced to fight one another often due to the color bar. Childs won every fight.

Klondike fought many of the top black heavyweights of his generation, including Jack Johnson, the first black man to win the world heavyweight championship. Klondike first declared himself the black heavyweight champion after beating Johnson in the future world heavyweight champ's third pro fight at Chicago's Howard Theater on 8 May 1899. It was Klondike's eighth professional bout.

According to the Chicago Tribune, "...Johnson knocked Haines down in Round one with an uppercut, and only the bell saved Klondyke..."

Klondike and Johnson fought again twice, with one bout ending as a draw and the third with Johnson winning by a technical knockout.

== Black Heavyweight Championship ==
On 4 September 1898, Frank Childs lost his world colored heavyweight title to George Byers. Regardless of losing the title, Childs fought Bob Armstrong again on 4 March 1899 in Cincinnati, Ohio in a fight announced as a title bought, despite Byers being the legitimate champion. He defeated Armstrong via a TKO in the sixth round of a 10-round bout.

On 11 August 1899, Childs challenged Klondike for his "Black Heavyweight Championship". In a six-round contest in Chicago, Childs prevailed by outpointing the "Black Hercules". On October 28 of that year, they met in a rematch in Chicago in which Childs retained the black heavyweight title by K.O.-ing Klondike in the third round of a six-round contest.

On 16 March 1900, Childs put his black heavyweight title on the line and Bryers put up his colored heavyweight crown in a six-round bout that ended in a draw. He fought Joe Butler on 15 December 1900 for the black heavyweight title, dispatching Butler via K.O. in the sixth. Finally, he took back the Colored World Heavyweight Championship legitimately from Bryers on 16 March 1901 in Hot Springs, Arkansas, K.O.-ing him in the 17th round of a 20-round fight. (He did not put up his black heavyweight title, which he never claimed again.)

Many years, later, when Sam Langford was denied a shot at the world heavyweight title by Jack Johnson, Langford claimed himself the colored heavyweight championship, much as Klondike had done a decade earlier when he declared himself the black heavyweight champ by beating the young Johnson. The problem with Langford's pretension was that the colored heavyweight title (which had been Johnson's from 1903 to 1908, when he vacated it upon winning the world heavyweight title) was held by Joe Jeanette.

On 13 July 1909, in Pittsburgh's Bijou Theater, Langford "claimed" the title by facing and defeating Klondike, the erstwhile black heavyweight champ, with a newspaper decision in a six-rounder. After defeating the Dixie Kid in a defense of his proclaimed title on September 29, Langford faced Klondike at the Armory in Boston in his second "title defense". He K.O.'ed Klondike in the second round of a 12-round fight. Langford eventually became undisputed champ when he beat Jeanette on 6 September 1910.

Klondike racked up an official record of 24 wins (14 by K.O.) against eleven losses (K.O.-ed six times) and three draws. He won five newspaper decisions, lost three and drew two.

== Professional boxing record ==
All information in this section is derived from BoxRec, unless otherwise stated.

=== Official record ===
51 fights	24 wins	11 losses
By knockout	14	8
By decision	9	1
By disqualification	1	2
Draws	3	
No contests	3	
Newspaper decisions/draws	10	

All Newspaper decisions are regarded as “no decision” bouts as they have “resulted in neither boxer winning or losing, and would therefore not count as part of their official fight record."

No.	Result	Record	Opponent	Type	Round	Date	Location	Notes
51	NC	24–11–3 (13)	George Kid Cotton	NC	5 (6)	Jan 16, 1911	Labor Temple, Pittsburgh, Pennsylvania, U.S.	
50	Loss	24–11–3 (12)	Sam Langford	KO	2 (12)	Nov 2, 1909	Armory, Boston, Massachusetts, U.S.	For world colored heavyweight title claim
49	Loss	24–10–3 (12)	Sam Langford	NWS	6	Jul 13, 1909	Bijou Theater, Pittsburgh, Pennsylvania, U.S.	Langford claimed the world colored heavyweight title
48	Loss	24–10–3 (11)	Black Bill	NWS	6	Jun 14, 1906	Broadway A.C., Philadelphia, Pennsylvania, U.S.	
47	Draw	24–10–3 (10)	Tom Foley	PTS	10	Sep 15, 1904	Chicago, Illinois, U.S.	
46	Loss	24–10–2 (10)	Frank Childs	KO	8 (?)	Jul 6, 1904	Houghton, Michigan, U.S.	
45	Loss	24–9–2 (10)	George Lawler	DQ	5 (10)	Apr 16, 1904	Houghton, Michigan, U.S.	
44	Win	24–8–2 (10)	Frank Mayo	KO	6 (?)	Feb 24, 1904	Oelwein, Iowa, U.S.	
43	Loss	23–8–2 (10)	Sandy Ferguson	TKO	6 (6)	Dec 26, 1903	9th Ward A.C., Chicago, Illinois, U.S.	
42	Win	23–7–2 (10)	Frank Mayo	KO	12 (?)	Oct 1, 1903	Dubuque, Iowa, U.S.	
41	Win	22–7–2 (10)	Tim Hurley	PTS	4	May 25, 1903	Beloit, Wisconsin, U.S.	
40	Win	21–7–2 (10)	Frank Mayo	TKO	4 (4)	May 25, 1903	Beloit, Wisconsin, U.S.	
39	Win	20–7–2 (10)	Frank Mayo	TKO	4 (8)	May 8, 1903	Beloit, Wisconsin, U.S.	
38	Draw	19–7–2 (10)	Walter Johnson	PTS	6	Mar 15, 1902	Chicago A.C., Chicago, Illinois, U.S.	
37	Loss	19–7–1 (10)	Fred Russell	KO	3 (6)	Mar 1, 1902	Wabash A.C., Chicago, Illinois, U.S.	
36	Win	19–6–1 (10)	Billy Clark	PTS	6	Feb 16, 1902	Chicago A.C., Chicago, Illinois, U.S.	
35	Win	18–6–1 (10)	Billy Clark	PTS	6	Dec 21, 1901	Chicago, Illinois, U.S.	
34	Loss	17–6–1 (10)	Jack Johnson	TKO	14 (20)	Dec 27, 1900	Phoenix A.C., Memphis, Tennessee, U.S.	
33	Win	17–5–1 (10)	Jim Brady	TKO	4 (6)	Nov 13, 1900	Tattersall's, Chicago, Pennsylvania, U.S.	
32	Draw	16–5–1 (10)	Joe Goddard	NWS	6	Nov 6, 1900	Star Theater, Philadelphia, Pennsylvania, U.S.	
31	Win	16–5–1 (9)	Jim Brady	PTS	6	Oct 30, 1900	Star A.C., Chicago, Illinois, U.S.	
30	Win	15–5–1 (9)	Jim Barnes	KO	4 (6)	Oct 16, 1900	Tattersall's, Chicago, Illinois, U.S.	
29	Loss	14–5–1 (9)	Peter Maher	DQ	5 (20)	Aug 20, 1900	Trenton A.C., Trenton, New Jersey, U.S.	
28	Draw	14–4–1 (9)	Ed Denfass	NWS	6	Jul 17, 1900	National A.C., Philadelphia, Pennsylvania, U.S.	
27	Draw	14–4–1 (8)	Jack Johnson	PTS	20	Jun 25, 1900	Galveston A.C., Galveston, Texas, U.S.	Pre-arranged draw if lasting the distance
26	Win	14–4 (8)	Rufus Graham	NWS	6	May 21, 1900	Broadway A.C., Philadelphia, Pennsylvania, U.S.	
25	Win	14–4 (7)	Charley Stevenson	NWS	6	May 12, 1900	National A.C., Philadelphia, Pennsylvania, U.S.	
24	Win	14–4 (6)	Henry Brum	KO	2 (6)	May 7, 1900	Broadway A.C., Philadelphia, Pennsylvania, U.S.	
23	Win	13–4 (6)	Rufus Graham	NWS	6	Apr 28, 1900	Nonpareil A.C., Philadelphia, Pennsylvania, U.S.	
22	Win	13–4 (5)	Charley Stevenson	NWS	6	Apr 7, 1900	Nonpareil A.C., Philadelphia, Pennsylvania, U.S.	
21	Win	13–4 (4)	John Morley	KO	3 (6)	Feb 24, 1900	Nonpareil A.C., Philadelphia, Pennsylvania, U.S.	
20	Win	12–4 (4)	Henry Brum	TKO	2 (6)	Feb 17, 1900	Nonpareil A.C., Philadelphia, Pennsylvania, U.S.	
19	Win	11–4 (4)	Thunderbolt Ed Smith	NWS	6	Feb 5, 1900	Industrial A.C., Philadelphia, Pennsylvania, U.S.	
18	NC	11–4 (3)	Harry Peppers	NC	2 (6)	Feb 2, 1900	Pelican A.C., Philadelphia, Pennsylvania, U.S.	Both fighters obviously weren't trying, the referee stopped the fight
17	Loss	11–4 (2)	Ed Martin	NWS	6	Jan 27, 1900	Nonpareil A.C., Philadelphia, Pennsylvania, U.S.	
16	Win	11–4 (1)	George Lawler	PTS	6	Dec 8, 1899	Milwaukee A.C., Milwaukee, Wisconsin, U.S.	
15	Loss	10–4 (1)	Frank Childs	KO	3 (6)	Oct 28, 1899	Chicago A.A., Chicago, Illinois, U.S.	For black heavyweight title
14	ND	10–3 (1)	Frank Scott	ND	4	Oct 5, 1899	Ben Harbour, Illinois, U.S.	
13	Loss	10–3	Frank Childs	PTS	6	Aug 11, 1899	Star Theatre, Chicago, Illinois, U.S.	Lost black heavyweight title
12	Win	10–2	Joe Goddard	DQ	4 (6)	Jun 21, 1899	Adelphi Theater, Chicago, Illinois, U.S.	
11	Win	9–2	Scaldy Bill Quinn	TKO	2 (6)	May 27, 1899	Howard Theater, Chicago, Illinois, U.S.	
10	Win	8–2	Bill Stone	KO	8 (?)	May 19, 1899	Ben Harbour, Illinois, U.S.	
9	Win	7–2	George Grant	PTS	6	May 12, 1899	Star Theatre, Chicago, Illinois, U.S.	
8	Win	6–2	Jack Johnson	TKO	5 (6)	May 6, 1899	Howard Theater, Chicago, Illinois, U.S.	Won inaugural black heavyweight title
7	Win	5–2	Jim Fordy	KO	2 (6)	Apr 29, 1899	Lyceum Theater, Chicago, Illinois, U.S.	
6	Win	4–2	Henry Baker	PTS	6	Mar 31, 1899	Fort Dearborn A.C., Chicago, Illinois, U.S.	
5	Win	3–2	Dick Woods	KO	2 (6)	Feb 24, 1899	Dearborn A.C., Chicago, Illinois, U.S.	
4	Win	2–2	Dan Bayliff	PTS	6	Jan 30, 1899	Seventh Regiment Armory, Chicago, Illinois, U.S.	
3	Win	1–2	George Grant	PTS	6	Nov 15, 1898	Madison Hall, Chicago, Illinois, U.S.	
2	Loss	0–2	Frank Childs	TKO	4 (6)	Feb 26, 1898	Chicago A.A., Chicago, Illinois, U.S.	
1	Loss	0–1	Frank Childs	KO	6 (6)	Jan 8, 1898	2nd Regiment Armory, Chicago, Illinois, U.S.	

=== Unofficial record ===
51 fights	32 wins	11 losses
By knockout	14	8
By decision	17	1
By disqualification	1	2
Draws	5	
No contests	3	

Record with the inclusion of Newspaper decisions to the win/loss/draw column.

No.	Result	Record	Opponent	Type	Round	Date	Location	Notes
51	NC	29–14–5 (3)	George Kid Cotton	NC	5 (6)	Jan 16, 1911	Labor Temple, Pittsburgh, Pennsylvania, U.S.	
50	Loss	29–14–5 (2)	Sam Langford	KO	2 (12)	Nov 2, 1909	Armory, Boston, Massachusetts, U.S.	For world colored heavyweight title claim
49	Loss	29–13–5 (2)	Sam Langford	NWS	6	Jul 13, 1909	Bijou Theater, Pittsburgh, Pennsylvania, U.S.	Langford claimed the world colored heavyweight title
48	Loss	29–12–5 (2)	Black Bill	NWS	6	Jun 14, 1906	Broadway A.C., Philadelphia, Pennsylvania, U.S.	
47	Draw	29–11–5 (2)	Tom Foley	PTS	10	Sep 15, 1904	Chicago, Illinois, U.S.	
46	Loss	29–11–4 (2)	Frank Childs	KO	8 (?)	Jul 6, 1904	Houghton, Michigan, U.S.	
45	Loss	29–10–4 (2)	George Lawler	DQ	5 (10)	Apr 16, 1904	Houghton, Michigan, U.S.	
44	Win	29–9–4 (2)	Frank Mayo	KO	6 (?)	Feb 24, 1904	Oelwein, Iowa, U.S.	
43	Loss	28–9–4 (2)	Sandy Ferguson	TKO	6 (6)	Dec 26, 1903	9th Ward A.C., Chicago, Illinois, U.S.	
42	Win	28–8–4 (2)	Frank Mayo	KO	12 (?)	Oct 1, 1903	Dubuque, Iowa, U.S.	
41	Win	27–8–4 (2)	Tim Hurley	PTS	4	May 25, 1903	Beloit, Wisconsin, U.S.	
40	Win	26–8–4 (2)	Frank Mayo	TKO	4 (4)	May 25, 1903	Beloit, Wisconsin, U.S.	
39	Win	25–8–4 (2)	Frank Mayo	TKO	4 (8)	May 8, 1903	Beloit, Wisconsin, U.S.	
38	Draw	24–8–4 (2)	Walter Johnson	PTS	6	Mar 15, 1902	Chicago A.C., Chicago, Illinois, U.S.	
37	Loss	24–8–3 (2)	Fred Russell	KO	3 (6)	Mar 1, 1902	Wabash A.C., Chicago, Illinois, U.S.	
36	Win	24–7–3 (2)	Billy Clark	PTS	6	Feb 16, 1902	Chicago A.C., Chicago, Illinois, U.S.	
35	Win	23–7–3 (2)	Billy Clark	PTS	6	Dec 21, 1901	Chicago, Illinois, U.S.	
34	Loss	22–7–3 (2)	Jack Johnson	TKO	14 (20)	Dec 27, 1900	Phoenix A.C., Memphis, Tennessee, U.S.	
33	Win	22–6–3 (2)	Jim Brady	TKO	4 (6)	Nov 13, 1900	Tattersall's, Chicago, Pennsylvania, U.S.	
32	Draw	21–6–3 (2)	Joe Goddard	NWS	6	Nov 6, 1900	Star Theater, Philadelphia, Pennsylvania, U.S.	
31	Win	21–6–2 (2)	Jim Brady	PTS	6	Oct 30, 1900	Star A.C., Chicago, Illinois, U.S.	
30	Win	20–6–2 (2)	Jim Barnes	KO	4 (6)	Oct 16, 1900	Tattersall's, Chicago, Illinois, U.S.	
29	Loss	19–6–2 (2)	Peter Maher	DQ	5 (20)	Aug 20, 1900	Trenton A.C., Trenton, New Jersey, U.S.	
28	Draw	19–5–2 (2)	Ed Denfass	NWS	6	Jul 17, 1900	National A.C., Philadelphia, Pennsylvania, U.S.	
27	Draw	19–5–1 (2)	Jack Johnson	PTS	20	Jun 25, 1900	Galveston A.C., Galveston, Texas, U.S.	Pre-arranged draw if lasting the distance
26	Win	19–5 (2)	Rufus Graham	NWS	6	May 21, 1900	Broadway A.C., Philadelphia, Pennsylvania, U.S.	
25	Win	18–5 (2)	Charley Stevenson	NWS	6	May 12, 1900	National A.C., Philadelphia, Pennsylvania, U.S.	
24	Win	17–5 (2)	Henry Brum	KO	2 (6)	May 7, 1900	Broadway A.C., Philadelphia, Pennsylvania, U.S.	
23	Win	16–5 (2)	Rufus Graham	NWS	6	Apr 28, 1900	Nonpareil A.C., Philadelphia, Pennsylvania, U.S.	
22	Win	15–5 (2)	Charley Stevenson	NWS	6	Apr 7, 1900	Nonpareil A.C., Philadelphia, Pennsylvania, U.S.	
21	Win	14–5 (2)	John Morley	KO	3 (6)	Feb 24, 1900	Nonpareil A.C., Philadelphia, Pennsylvania, U.S.	
20	Win	13–5 (2)	Henry Brum	TKO	2 (6)	Feb 17, 1900	Nonpareil A.C., Philadelphia, Pennsylvania, U.S.	
19	Win	12–5 (2)	Thunderbolt Ed Smith	NWS	6	Feb 5, 1900	Industrial A.C., Philadelphia, Pennsylvania, U.S.	
18	NC	11–5 (2)	Harry Peppers	NC	2 (6)	Feb 2, 1900	Pelican A.C., Philadelphia, Pennsylvania, U.S.	Both fighters obviously weren't trying, the referee stopped the fight
17	Loss	11–5 (1)	Ed Martin	NWS	6	Jan 27, 1900	Nonpareil A.C., Philadelphia, Pennsylvania, U.S.	
16	Win	11–4 (1)	George Lawler	PTS	6	Dec 8, 1899	Milwaukee A.C., Milwaukee, Wisconsin, U.S.	
15	Loss	10–4 (1)	Frank Childs	KO	3 (6)	Oct 28, 1899	Chicago A.A., Chicago, Illinois, U.S.	For black heavyweight title
14	ND	10–3 (1)	Frank Scott	ND	4	Oct 5, 1899	Ben Harbour, Illinois, U.S.	
13	Loss	10–3	Frank Childs	PTS	6	Aug 11, 1899	Star Theatre, Chicago, Illinois, U.S.	Lost black heavyweight title
12	Win	10–2	Joe Goddard	DQ	4 (6)	Jun 21, 1899	Adelphi Theater, Chicago, Illinois, U.S.	
11	Win	9–2	Scaldy Bill Quinn	TKO	2 (6)	May 27, 1899	Howard Theater, Chicago, Illinois, U.S.	
10	Win	8–2	Bill Stone	KO	8 (?)	May 19, 1899	Ben Harbour, Illinois, U.S.	
9	Win	7–2	George Grant	PTS	6	May 12, 1899	Star Theatre, Chicago, Illinois, U.S.	
8	Win	6–2	Jack Johnson	TKO	5 (6)	May 6, 1899	Howard Theater, Chicago, Illinois, U.S.	Won inaugural black heavyweight title
7	Win	5–2	Jim Fordy	KO	2 (6)	Apr 29, 1899	Lyceum Theater, Chicago, Illinois, U.S.	
6	Win	4–2	Henry Baker	PTS	6	Mar 31, 1899	Fort Dearborn A.C., Chicago, Illinois, U.S.	
5	Win	3–2	Dick Woods	KO	2 (6)	Feb 24, 1899	Dearborn A.C., Chicago, Illinois, U.S.	
4	Win	2–2	Dan Bayliff	PTS	6	Jan 30, 1899	Seventh Regiment Armory, Chicago, Illinois, U.S.	
3	Win	1–2	George Grant	PTS	6	Nov 15, 1898	Madison Hall, Chicago, Illinois, U.S.	
2	Loss	0–2	Frank Childs	TKO	4 (6)	Feb 26, 1898	Chicago A.A., Chicago, Illinois, U.S.	
1	Loss	0–1	Frank Childs	KO	6 (6)	Jan 8, 1898	2nd Regiment Armory, Chicago, Illinois, U.S.	

Titles in pretence
Unknown	Black Heavyweight Champion; May 8 – August 11, 1899	Succeeded by Frank Childs
