= Black Heavyweight Championship =

The Black Heavyweight Championship was a title in pretense claimed by the African American boxer Klondike (January 1, 1878 – February 3, 1949), who was born John Haines or John W. Haynes and by two-time colored heavyweight champ Frank Childs (July 17, 1867 – June 20, 1936).

The six-foot-tall (1.8 m) Klondike fought out of Chicago as a heavyweight at a weight of 190 to 200 pounds (86 to 91 kg) from 1898 to 1911. He took the nickname because he was supposed to be a great find (evoking the Klondike Gold Rush). He also was billed as "The Black Hercules". Childs, "The Crafty Texan", fought professionally out of Chicago from 1892 to 1911. Fighting at a weight between 160 and 185 pounds (73 and 84 kg), the short, stocky Childs fought middleweights, light-heavyweights and heavyweights.

Klondike declared himself the black heavyweight champion (not to be confused with the World Colored Heavyweight Championship, which he officially fought for just once and unofficially another time). He had made his pro boxing debut against Childs on 8 January 1898 at Chicago's 2nd Regiment Armory, losing by a knockout (KO). Later that month, on the 29th, Childs won the world colored heavyweight title from Bob Armstrong and his first defense of the title was against Klondike on February 26. Childs won by a technical knockout (TKO) in the fourth round of the scheduled six-round bout when the referee stopped the fight.

They fought again four times, as African American boxers were forced to fight one another often due to the color bar. Childs won every fight.

== Black Heavyweight Champions ==
Klondike fought many of the top black heavyweights of his generation, including Jack Johnson, the first black man to win the world heavyweight championship. Klondike first declared himself the black heavyweight champion after beating Johnson in the future world heavyweight champ's third pro fight at Chicago's Howard Theater on 8 May 1899. It was only Klondike's eighth pro bout.

Klondike and Johnson fought again twice, with one bout ending as a draw and the third with Johnson winning by a TKO.

On 4 September 1898, Frank Childs lost his world colored heavyweight title to George Byers. Regardless of having lost the title, Childs fought Bob Armstrong, from whom he had won the championship on 29 January 1898, on 4 March 1899 in Cincinnati, Ohio, in a fight announced as a title bought, despite Byers being the legitimate champion. He defeated Armstrong via a TKO in the sixth round of a 10-round bout.

On 11 August 1899, Childs challenged Klondike for his "Black Heavyweight Championship". In a six-round contest in Chicago, Childs prevailed by outpointing the "Black Hercules". On October 28 of that year, they met in a rematch in Chicago in which Childs retained the black heavyweight title by knocking out Klondike in the third round of a six-round contest.

On 16 March 1900, Childs put his black heavyweight title on the line and Bryers put up his colored heavyweight crown in a six-round bout that ended in a draw. He fought Joe Butler on 15 December 1900 for the black heavyweight title, dispatching Butler via knockout in the sixth. Finally, he took back the Colored World Heavyweight Championship legitimately from Bryers on 16 March 1901 in Hot Springs, Arkansas, knocking him out in the 17th round of a 20-round fight. Childs did not put up his black heavyweight title, which he never officially fought for again.

Childs lost his colored heavyweight title to Ed Martin on 24 February 1902 in Chicago. However, be continued to claim to be the colored champ (possibly due to his black heavyweight title) until he was defeated by Jack Johnson on 21 October 1902. Johnson beat Martin for the colored title on 5 February 1903 in Los Angeles, California.

== Sam Langford ==
Seven years after Childs lost to Jack Johnson and gave up his claim to the black and colored heavyweight titles, Sam Langford was denied a shot at the world heavyweight title by Johnson. Langford subsequently claimed himself the colored heavyweight championship, much as Klondike had done a decade earlier when he declared himself the black heavyweight champ by beating the young Johnson. The problem with Langford's pretension was that the colored heavyweight title (which had been Johnson's from 1903 to 1908, when he vacated it upon winning the world heavyweight title) was held by Joe Jeanette.

On 13 July 1909, in Pittsburgh's Bijou Theater, Langford "claimed" the title by facing and defeating Klondike, the erstwhile black heavyweight champ, with a newspaper decision in a six-rounder. After defeating the Dixie Kid in a defense of his proclaimed title on September 29, Langford faced Klondike at the Armory in Boston in his second "title defense". He knocked out Klondike in the second round of a 12-round fight. Langford eventually became undisputed colored champ when he beat Jeanette on 6 September 1910.

== List of champions ==
#	Name	Reign	Date	Days held	Location	Defenses	Notes
1	Klondike	1	May 8, 1899	95	Chicago, Illinois, US	1	Declared himself black heavyweight champion after defeating Jack Johnson.
2	Frank Childs	1	August 11, 1899	1166	Chicago, Illinois, US	3	Gives up pretensions as colored heavyweight champ after defeat by Jack Johnson.

== See also ==
- World Colored Heavyweight Championship
- World Colored Light Heavyweight Championship
- World Colored Middleweight Championship
- World Colored Welterweight Championship
- World White Heavyweight Championship
