= George Byers (boxer) =

Canadian boxer (1872–1937)

George Frederick Byers
Personal information
- Nickname: "Budge"
- Nationality: Canadian
- Born: June 25, 1872 The Bog, Charlottetown, Prince Edward Island
- Died: April 10, 1937 (aged 64) Boston, Massachusetts
- Height: 5 ft 8.5 in (174.0 cm)
- Weight: Light heavyweight Heavyweight

Boxing career

Boxing record
- Total fights: 52
- Wins: 20
- Win by KO: 13
- Losses: 8 (4 KO)
- Draws: 21
- No contests: 3

George Byers (June 25, 1872 – April 10, 1937) was a Canadian boxer who won the World Colored Middleweight Championship in 1897 and held the World Colored Heavyweight Championship from September 14, 1898, to March 16, 1901, a reign of 913 days. The 5′ 8½″ fought out of Boston from 1895 to 1904 at a weight of between 120 and 165 lbs., in many weight classes and frequently against men that were much larger than himself. On 9 December 1897 in Waterbury, Connecticut, he faced Harry Peppers in a title match for the World Colored Middleweight Championship. Byers knocked out the undefeated Peppers, the Pacific Coast Middleweight Champion of the Pacific Coast in the 19th round of a 20-round contest. He took up US citizenship in 1917 (subscription required)

== Rivalry With Frank Childs ==
Byers fought Frank Childs for the world colored heavyweight title on 14 September 1898 at the Lenox Athletic Club in New York City, winning on points in a 20-round bout. Childs continued to claim the title during Byers' reign, and fought former colored heavyweight champ Bob Armstrong on 4 March 1899 in Cincinnati, Ohio, in a fight announced as being for the title.

Byers next fought Childs, who was billing himself as the "black heavyweight title" holder, on 16 March at the Star Athletic Club in Chicago. Byers had put his colored heavyweight title on the line and emerged victorious, winning a decision in a six-round contest.

One year later, on 16 March 1901, Byers lost his title to Childs when the ex-champ KO-ed him in the 17th round of a 20-round title bout. They never fought again.

== Record ==
Byers racked up a record of 20 wins (17 by knock out) against seven losses (knocked out four times) and 20 draws.

== Legacy & Honors ==
In 2020 award-winning author Mark Allen Baker published the first comprehensive account of The World Colored Heavyweight Championship, 1876-1937, with McFarland & Company, a leading independent publisher of academic & nonfiction books. This history traces the advent and demise of the Championship, the stories of the talented professional athletes who won it, and the demarcation of the color line both in and out of the ring.

For decades the World Colored Heavyweight Championship was a useful tool to combat racial oppression-the existence of the title a leverage mechanism, or tool, used as a technique to counter a social element, “drawing the color line.”

== Death ==
Byers died in Boston City Hospital, either of pneumonia or a heart attack depending on conflicting reports, in 1937.

== Professional boxing record ==
All information in this section is derived from BoxRec, unless otherwise stated.

=== Official record ===
52 fights	20 wins	7 losses
By knockout	14	4
By decision	6	2
By disqualification	0	1
Draws	20	
No contests	3	
Newspaper decisions/draws	2	

All newspaper decisions are officially regarded as “no decision” bouts and are not counted in the win/loss/draw column.

No.	Result	Record	Opponent	Type	Round	Date	Location	Notes
52	Draw	20–7–20 (5)	Charlie Haghey	PTS	10	May 3, 1904	Portland, Maine, US	
51	Win	20–7–19 (5)	Cyclone Robinson	KO	1 (10)	Mar 21, 1904	Pastime A.C., Portland, Maine, US	
50	Win	19–7–19 (5)	Black Fitzsimmons	TKO	8 (10)	Mar 14, 1904	Pastime A.C., Portland, Maine, US	
49	Win	18–7–19 (5)	Dick Moore	KO	3 (12)	Jul 31, 1903	Lenox A.C., Boston, Massachusetts, US	
48	Loss	17–7–19 (5)	Philadelphia Jack O'Brien	NWS	6	May 23, 1903	National A.C., Philadelphia, Pennsylvania, US	
47	Loss	17–7–19 (4)	Sandy Ferguson	PTS	12	Apr 8, 1903	Tempiar A.C., Brighton, Massachusetts, US	
46	Draw	17–6–19 (4)	Charlie Haghey	PTS	12	Feb 23, 1903	Lawrence, Massachusetts, US	
45	Draw	17–6–18 (4)	Sandy Ferguson	PTS	8	Jan 22, 1903	Brighton Social & A.C., Brighton, Massachusetts, US	Pre arranged draw if lasting the distance
44	Win	17–6–17 (4)	Mike Schalow	PTS	6	Dec 25, 1902	Lenox A.C., Boston, Massachusetts, US	
43	Draw	16–6–17 (4)	Jack 'Twin' Sullivan	PTS	6	Dec 1, 1902	Bangor, Maine, US	
42	Draw	16–6–16 (4)	Dick O'Brien	PTS	10	Oct 30, 1902	Norumbega Hall, Bangor, Maine, US	
41	Win	16–6–15 (4)	Charlie Haghey	PTS	10	May 9, 1902	East Boston A.A., Boston, Massachusetts, US	
40	Win	15–6–15 (4)	J. Wightman	KO	1 (10)	Apr 19, 1902	Bowdoin Square Athletic Club, Boston, Massachusetts, US	
39	Loss	14–6–15 (4)	Tom Carey	TKO	13 (15)	Nov 28, 1901	Casino, New Britain, Connecticut, US	
38	Loss	14–5–15 (4)	Billy Stift	PTS	6	Nov 9, 1901	Chicago A.C., Chicago, Illinois, US	
37	Draw	14–4–15 (4)	Mysterious Billy Smith	PTS	15	Aug 19, 1901	Victoria Rink, Saint John, New Brunswick, Canada	
36	Loss	14–4–14 (4)	Frank Childs	KO	17 (20)	Mar 16, 1901	Hot Springs, Arkansas, US	Lost world colored heavyweight title
35	Loss	14–3–14 (4)	Jack Root	KO	9 (20)	Jan 18, 1901	Woodward's Pavilion, San Francisco, California, US	
34	Win	14–2–14 (4)	Tim Draffin Murphy	PTS	6	Oct 30, 1900	Star A.C., Chicago, Illinois, US	
33	Draw	13–2–14 (4)	'Wild' Bill Hanrahan	PTS	15	Aug 29, 1900	Pawtucket, Rhode Island, US	
32	Draw	13–2–13 (4)	Dick O'Brien	PTS	15	May 30, 1900	Lynn, Massachusetts, US	
31	NC	13–2–12 (4)	George Gardner	NC	15 (15)	May 14, 1900	Roanoke A.C., Boston, Massachusetts, US	Fight stopped for "bluffing"
30	Draw	13–2–12 (3)	Frank Childs	PTS	6	Mar 16, 1900	Star Athletic Club, Chicago, Illinois, US	Retained world colored heavyweight title; For black heavyweight title
29	Loss	13–2–11 (3)	George Gardner	DQ	14 (15)	Feb 22, 1900	Coliseum, Hartford, Connecticut, US	Byers DQ'd for hitting Gardner after a knockdown
28	Win	13–1–11 (3)	Martin Mulverhill	TKO	2 (15)	Feb 12, 1900	Kirkland Athletic Club, Lynn, Massachusetts, US	
27	Draw	12–1–11 (3)	George Gardner	NWS	15	Feb 2, 1900	Lasters Hall, Lynn, Massachusetts, US	Pre-arranged draw if it lasted the distance
26	Draw	12–1–11 (2)	Jim McCormick	PTS	12	Jan 11, 1900	Brockton Athletic Club, Brockton, Massachusetts, US	
25	Draw	12–1–10 (2)	Dick O'Brien	PTS	10	Dec 28, 1899	Lewiston, Maine, US	
24	Win	12–1–9 (2)	Jack Burke	PTS	10	Nov 3, 1899	Kirtland Athletic Club, Lynn, Massachusetts, US	
23	Loss	11–1–9 (2)	Tommy West	KO	7 (25)	Sep 4, 1899	Coney Island Athletic Club, New York City, New York, US	
22	Draw	11–0–9 (2)	Australian Jim Ryan	PTS	25	Aug 12, 1899	Greenwood Athletic Club, New York City, New York, US	
21	Win	11–0–8 (2)	Charley Strong	TKO	9 (20)	Jul 24, 1899	Coney Island Athletic Club, New York City, New York, US	
20	Draw	10–0–8 (2)	Billy Stift	PTS	6	Jun 16, 1899	Star Theatre, Chicago, Illinois, US	
19	NC	10–0–7 (2)	Dick O'Brien	NC	3	May 30, 1899	Pawtucket, Rhode Island, US	
18	Win	10–0–7 (1)	Jack Cattanach	TKO	2 (10)	May 3, 1899	Pawtucket, Rhode Island, US	
17	Win	9–0–7 (1)	Charles Goff	TKO	2 (20)	Apr 3, 1899	Broadway Athletic Club, New York City, New York, US	
16	Draw	8–0–7 (1)	Jack Bonner	PTS	20	Dec 13, 1898	Lenox Athletic Club, New York City, New York, US	
15	Win	8–0–6 (1)	Frank Childs	PTS	20	Sep 14, 1898	Lenox Athletic Club, New York City, New York, US	Won world colored heavyweight title
14	ND	7–0–6 (1)	Bob Armstrong	ND	?	May 2, 1898	Roanoke Athletic Club, Boston, Massachusetts, US	Winner not specified
13	Draw	7–0–6	Johnny Gorman	PTS	8	Apr 28, 1898	Lynn, Massachusetts, US	Pre-arranged draw if it lasted the distance
12	Win	7–0–5	Harry Peppers	KO	19 (20)	Dec 9, 1897	Auditorium, Waterbury, Connecticut, US	
11	Draw	6–0–5	Dan Murphy	PTS	20	Nov 11, 1897	Jacque's Auditorium, Waterbury, Connecticut, US	
10	Draw	6–0–4	Charles Goff	PTS	12	Sep 23, 1897	Gladiator Athletic Club, Hartford, Connecticut, US	
9	Draw	6–0–3	Dan Murphy	PTS	15	May 25, 1897	Nutmeg Athletic Club, Hartford, Connecticut, US	
8	Draw	6–0–2	Dan Murphy	PTS	10	Apr 5, 1897	Auditorium, Hartford, Connecticut, US	
7	Win	6–0–1	Lon Beckwith	TKO	5 (12)	Mar 24, 1897	Broadway Athletic Club, New York City, New York, US	
6	Win	5–0–1	James McNamara	KO	3 (10)	Feb 25, 1897	New York City, New York, US	
5	Win	4–0–1	Jack Boylan	KO	2 (10)	Feb 17, 1897	New Polo Athletic Club, New York City, New York, US	
4	Win	3–0–1	Dan Carroll	TKO	7 (10)	Dec 16, 1896	Boston, Massachusetts, US	
3	Win	2–0–1	Charley Smith	PTS	8	Dec 1, 1895	Boston, Massachusetts, US	Exact date is unavailable
2	Win	1–0–1	Charley Gerrard	KO	2 (8)	Nov 11, 1895	Boston, Massachusetts, US	Exact date is unavailable
1	Draw	0–0–1	Jack Colbert	PTS	3	Aug 23, 1895	Boston, Massachusetts, US	

=== Unofficial record ===
52 fights	20 wins	8 losses
By knockout	14	4
By decision	6	3
By disqualification	0	1
Draws	21	
No contests	3	

Record with the inclusion of newspaper decisions in the win/loss/draw column.

No.	Result	Record	Opponent	Type	Round, time	Date	Location	Notes
52	Draw	20–8–20 (3)	Charlie Haghey	PTS	10	May 3, 1904	Portland, Maine, US	
51	Win	20–8–19 (3)	Cyclone Robinson	KO	1 (10)	Mar 21, 1904	Pastime A.C., Portland, Maine, US	
50	Win	19–8–19 (3)	Black Fitzsimmons	TKO	8 (10)	Mar 14, 1904	Pastime A.C., Portland, Maine, US	
49	Win	18–8–19 (3)	Dick Moore	KO	3 (12)	Jul 31, 1903	Lenox A.C., Boston, Massachusetts, US	
48	Loss	17–8–19 (3)	Philadelphia Jack O'Brien	NWS	6	May 23, 1903	National A.C., Philadelphia, Pennsylvania, US	
47	Loss	17–7–19 (3)	Sandy Ferguson	PTS	12	Apr 8, 1903	Tempiar A.C., Brighton, Massachusetts, US	
46	Draw	17–6–19 (3)	Charlie Haghey	PTS	12	Feb 23, 1903	Lawrence, Massachusetts, US	
45	Draw	17–6–18 (3)	Sandy Ferguson	PTS	8	Jan 22, 1903	Brighton Social & A.C., Brighton, Massachusetts, US	Pre arranged draw if lasting the distance
44	Win	17–6–17 (3)	Mike Schalow	PTS	6	Dec 25, 1902	Lenox A.C., Boston, Massachusetts, US	
43	Draw	16–6–17 (3)	Jack 'Twin' Sullivan	PTS	6	Dec 1, 1902	Bangor, Maine, US	
42	Draw	16–6–16 (3)	Dick O'Brien	PTS	10	Oct 30, 1902	Norumbega Hall, Bangor, Maine, US	
41	Win	16–6–15 (3)	Charlie Haghey	PTS	10	May 9, 1902	East Boston A.A., Boston, Massachusetts, US	
40	Win	15–6–15 (3)	J. Wightman	KO	1 (10)	Apr 19, 1902	Bowdoin Square Athletic Club, Boston, Massachusetts, US	
39	Loss	14–6–15 (3)	Tom Carey	TKO	13 (15)	Nov 28, 1901	Casino, New Britain, Connecticut, US	
38	Loss	14–5–15 (3)	Billy Stift	PTS	6	Nov 9, 1901	Chicago A.C., Chicago, Illinois, US	
37	Draw	14–4–15 (3)	Mysterious Billy Smith	PTS	15	Aug 19, 1901	Victoria Rink, Saint John, New Brunswick, Canada	
36	Loss	14–4–14 (3)	Frank Childs	KO	17 (20)	Mar 16, 1901	Hot Springs, Arkansas, US	Lost world colored heavyweight title
35	Loss	14–3–14 (3)	Jack Root	KO	9 (20)	Jan 18, 1901	Woodward's Pavilion, San Francisco, California, US	
34	Win	14–2–14 (3)	Tim Draffin Murphy	PTS	6	Oct 30, 1900	Star A.C., Chicago, Illinois, US	
33	Draw	13–2–14 (3)	'Wild' Bill Hanrahan	PTS	15	Aug 29, 1900	Pawtucket, Rhode Island, US	
32	Draw	13–2–13 (3)	Dick O'Brien	PTS	15	May 30, 1900	Lynn, Massachusetts, US	
31	NC	13–2–12 (3)	George Gardner	NC	15 (15)	May 14, 1900	Roanoke A.C., Boston, Massachusetts, US	Fight stopped for "bluffing"
30	Draw	13–2–12 (2)	Frank Childs	PTS	6	Mar 16, 1900	Star Athletic Club, Chicago, Illinois, US	Retained world colored heavyweight title; For black heavyweight title
29	Loss	13–2–12 (2)	George Gardner	DQ	14 (15)	Feb 22, 1900	Coliseum, Hartford, Connecticut, US	Byers DQ'd for hitting Gardner after a knockdown
28	Win	13–1–12 (2)	Martin Mulverhill	TKO	2 (15)	Feb 12, 1900	Kirkland Athletic Club, Lynn, Massachusetts, US	
27	Draw	12–1–12 (2)	George Gardner	NWS	15	Feb 2, 1900	Lasters Hall, Lynn, Massachusetts, US	Pre-arranged draw if it lasted the distance
26	Draw	12–1–11 (2)	Jim McCormick	PTS	12	Jan 11, 1900	Brockton Athletic Club, Brockton, Massachusetts, US	
25	Draw	12–1–10 (2)	Dick O'Brien	PTS	10	Dec 28, 1899	Lewiston, Maine, US	
24	Win	12–1–9 (2)	Jack Burke	PTS	10	Nov 3, 1899	Kirtland Athletic Club, Lynn, Massachusetts, US	
23	Loss	11–1–9 (2)	Tommy West	KO	7 (25)	Sep 4, 1899	Coney Island Athletic Club, New York City, New York, US	
22	Draw	11–0–9 (2)	Australian Jim Ryan	PTS	25	Aug 12, 1899	Greenwood Athletic Club, New York City, New York, US	
21	Win	11–0–8 (2)	Charley Strong	TKO	9 (20)	Jul 24, 1899	Coney Island Athletic Club, New York City, New York, US	
20	Draw	10–0–8 (2)	Billy Stift	PTS	6	Jun 16, 1899	Star Theatre, Chicago, Illinois, US	
19	NC	10–0–7 (2)	Dick O'Brien	NC	3	May 30, 1899	Pawtucket, Rhode Island, US	
18	Win	10–0–7 (1)	Jack Cattanach	TKO	2 (10)	May 3, 1899	Pawtucket, Rhode Island, US	
17	Win	9–0–7 (1)	Charles Goff	TKO	2 (20)	Apr 3, 1899	Broadway Athletic Club, New York City, New York, US	
16	Draw	8–0–7 (1)	Jack Bonner	PTS	20	Dec 13, 1898	Lenox Athletic Club, New York City, New York, US	
15	Win	8–0–6 (1)	Frank Childs	PTS	20	Sep 14, 1898	Lenox Athletic Club, New York City, New York, US	Won world colored heavyweight title
14	ND	7–0–6 (1)	Bob Armstrong	ND	?	May 2, 1898	Roanoke Athletic Club, Boston, Massachusetts, US	Winner not specified
13	Draw	7–0–6	Johnny Gorman	PTS	8	Apr 28, 1898	Lynn, Massachusetts, US	Pre-arranged draw if it lasted the distance
12	Win	7–0–5	Harry Peppers	KO	19 (20)	Dec 9, 1897	Auditorium, Waterbury, Connecticut, US	
11	Draw	6–0–5	Dan Murphy	PTS	20	Nov 11, 1897	Jacque's Auditorium, Waterbury, Connecticut, US	
10	Draw	6–0–4	Charles Goff	PTS	12	Sep 23, 1897	Gladiator Athletic Club, Hartford, Connecticut, US	
9	Draw	6–0–3	Dan Murphy	PTS	15	May 25, 1897	Nutmeg Athletic Club, Hartford, Connecticut, US	
8	Draw	6–0–2	Dan Murphy	PTS	10	Apr 5, 1897	Auditorium, Hartford, Connecticut, US	
7	Win	6–0–1	Lon Beckwith	TKO	5 (12)	Mar 24, 1897	Broadway Athletic Club, New York City, New York, US	
6	Win	5–0–1	James McNamara	KO	3 (10)	Feb 25, 1897	New York City, New York, US	
5	Win	4–0–1	Jack Boylan	KO	2 (10)	Feb 17, 1897	New Polo Athletic Club, New York City, New York, US	
4	Win	3–0–1	Dan Carroll	TKO	7 (10)	Dec 16, 1896	Boston, Massachusetts, US	
3	Win	2–0–1	Charley Smith	PTS	8	Dec 1, 1895	Boston, Massachusetts, US	Exact date is unavailable
2	Win	1–0–1	Charley Gerrard	KO	2 (8)	Nov 11, 1895	Boston, Massachusetts, US	Exact date is unavailable
1	Draw	0–0–1	Jack Colbert	PTS	3	Aug 23, 1895	Boston, Massachusetts, US	

Awards and achievements
Preceded by Unknown	World Colored Middleweight Championship; December 9, 1897–Unknown	Succeeded by Unknown
Preceded by Frank Childs	World Colored Heavyweight Championship; September 14, 1898–March 16, 1901	Succeeded by Frank Childs
