= Ed Martin (boxer) =

American boxer (d. 1937)

Denver Ed Martin
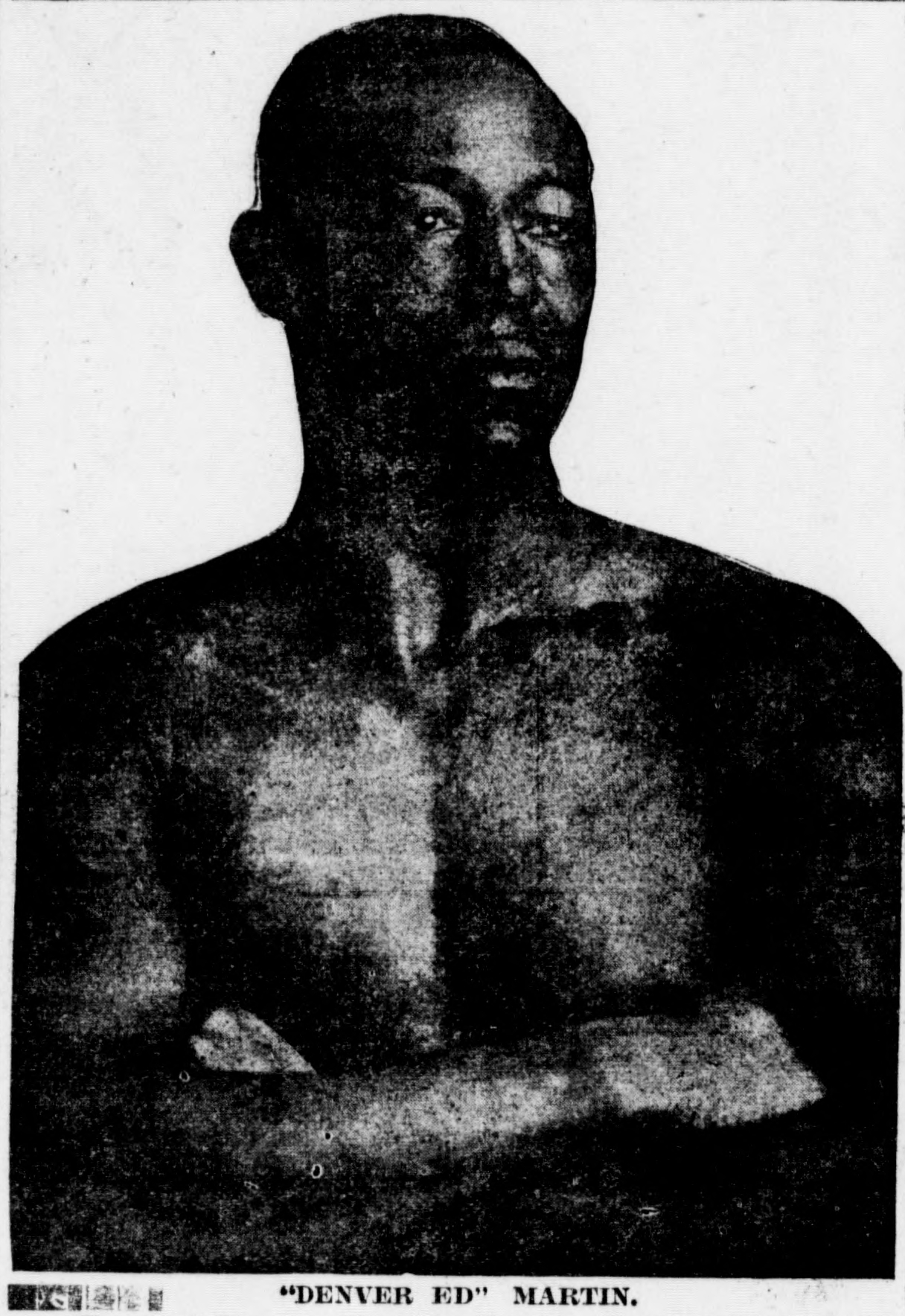

Personal information
- Nickname: The Colorado Giant
- Born: Edward Martin; September 10, 1881 or 1877 Denver, Colorado, U.S.
- Died: May 11, 1937 (aged 56 or 59) Oakland, California, U.S.
- Height: 6 ft 3 1/2 in (1.92 m)
- Weight: Heavyweight

Boxing career
- Stance: Orthodox

Boxing record
- Total fights: 42
- Wins: 26
- Win by KO: 17
- Losses: 10
- Draws: 4
- No contests: 2

Edward "Denver Ed" Martin (September 10, 1881, or 1877 – May 11, 1937) was an American boxer who was the World Colored Heavyweight Champion from February 24, 1902, when he beat Frank Childs, until February 5, 1903, when he lost his title to Jack Johnson, the only Colored Heavyweight Champion (and first African American) to win the world's heavyweight championship.

Known as "Denver Ed Martin" and "The Colorado Giant", Martin was born in Denver, Colorado, on September 10, 1881 (or 1877). His father was born in Alabama and his mother in Georgia. His height was listed as 6 ft 3 1/2 in (1.918 m), while some sources report that he was 6' 6" or 6' 6½" tall. Martin was a strong boxer with renowned footwork who was a strong puncher.

== World Colored Heavyweight Champ ==
Martin made his debut against former colored heavyweight champ Bob Armstrong on June 6, 1899, at the Lenox Athletic Club in New York City and was knocked out in the second round. He became the colored heavyweight champ when he beat title-holder Frank Childs in a bout in Chicago on February 25, 1902, out-pointing the champ in a six-round contest.

He defended the colored heavyweight title against rival Bob Armstrong at the Crystal Palace in London on July 25, 1902. According to the Associated Press coverage of the fight:

"Martin proved the cleverer and never gave his opponent a chance, being declared an easy winner on points at the close of the fifteenth round; Martin, it is announced, will challenge the winner of the Jeffries-Fitzsimmons fight in San Francsico."

World heavyweight champ James J. Jeffries, who had fought Armstrong and other African American boxers on the way up through the ranks, maintained the color bar erected by bare-knuckles champ John L. Sullivan, though Martin was not given a title shot. Instead, he met Armstrong for a rematch in Philadelphia on December 10. According to the Daily Gazette and Bulletin:

"The bout was fast from the start and both men narrowly escaped a knockout. The bell saved Armstrong in the third and fifth and Martin was floored six times in the fourth round."

The six-round bout ended in a no decision. In his next fight, Martin lost his title to Jack Johnson in a decision after 20 rounds. The two fighters treated each other cautiously in the first 10 rounds, but Johnson dropped Martin in the 11th with a right hand to the neck. It was the first of five times he hit the canvas in that round. With his footwork, Martin managed to go the distance, but lost the title.

Martin met Johnson in a rematch for the colored heavyweight title match in Los Angeles on October 18, 1904, and was knocked out in the second round. In addition to the colored heavyweight title, he shared the distinction with Johnson of having beaten future Oscar winner Victor McLaglen in the ring, before the pugilist turned to acting. Johnson beat McLaglen in a six-round exhibition in 1909, while Martin knocked out McLaglen in the third round of a scheduled 20-round bout in Aberdeen, Washington the year before.

Johnson broke the color bar in 1908 when he beat Canadian Tommy Burns and became the first African American heavyweight champion of the world. As the heavyweight champ, Johnson dodged African American heavyweights too, though it was on the basis that a fight between two black boxers would prove a bust at the box office. Just like Jeffries, he did not give Martin a shot at the world heavyweight title, either.

== Retirement and comeback ==
Martin retired in 1914, after a loss to Englishman Tom Cowler, "The Cumberland Giant ", who knocked him out in the second round. He moved to the Portland, Oregon area, where he kept his hand in the fight game and refereed fights. He staged a comeback in Oregon in 1921, winning three fights, all by knock-outs. None of the fights went more than four rounds.

Martin's last fight was similar to his first in that it involved a fellow colored heavyweight champ. On November 18, 1921, he met colored heavyweight champ Harry Wills in a ten-round bout in Milwaukie, Oregon. Wills knocked Martin down six times before knocking him out in the first round. He retired with a record of 23 wins (17 by KO), nine losses (eight by KO) and three + draws. He also won two newspaper decisions.

In 1933, Martin was living in Oakland, California where he ran a cigar shop. He died on May 11, 1937, in Oakland and was buried at Mountain View Cemetery in that same city.

== Professional boxing record ==
All information in this section is derived from BoxRec, unless otherwise stated.

=== Official record ===
42 fights	23 wins	10 losses
By knockout	17	9
By decision	4	1
By disqualification	2	0
Draws	3	
No contests	2	
Newspaper decisions/draws	4	

All newspaper decisions are officially regarded as “no decision” bouts and are not counted in the win/loss/draw column.

No.	Result	Record	Opponent	Type	Round, time	Date	Location	Notes
42	Loss	23–10–3 (6)	Harry Wills	KO	1 (10), 2:05	Nov 18, 1921	Arena, Milwaukie, Oregon, US	For world colored heavyweight title
41	Win	23–9–3 (6)	'Sergeant' Ray Smith	KO	3 (10)	Oct 19, 1921	Arena, Milwaukie, Oregon, US	
40	Win	22–9–3 (6)	Tiny Jim Herman	KO	4 (10)	Sep 21, 1921	Arena, Milwaukie, Oregon, US	
39	Win	21–9–3 (6)	Young Hector	KO	2 (10)	Sep 7, 1921	Arena, Milwaukie, Oregon, US	
38	Win	20–9–3 (6)	'Young' Sam McVey	TKO	3 (8)	Jan 31, 1916	Phoenix A.C., Memphis, Tennessee, US	
37	Loss	19–9–3 (6)	Tom Cowler	KO	2 (15)	Mar 7, 1914	Steveston, British Columbia, Canada	
36	Draw	19–8–3 (6)	Ed Hagen	PTS	6	Jul 3, 1913	Armory, Centralia, Washington, US	
35	Draw	19–8–2 (6)	White Hope	PTS	4	Mar 3, 1912	Location unknown	
34	NC	19–8–1 (6)	Tommy Ryan	NC	6	Nov 29, 1911	Armory, Portland, Oregon, US	
33	ND	19–8–1 (5)	Ed Hagen	ND	6	Feb 22, 1911	Elks Club, Everett, Washington, US	
32	Win	19–8–1 (4)	Ed Hagen	DQ	3 (4)	Jan 20, 1911	Empire Theatre, Seattle, Washington, US	Hagen DQ'd for headbutting
31	Win	18–8–1 (4)	Gunboat Smith	NWS	4	Jul 16, 1909	Arena, Seattle, Washington, US	
30	Draw	18–8–1 (3)	Benjamin Roller	PTS	6	Jan 19, 1909	Seattle Theater, Seattle, Washington, US	
29	Win	18–8 (3)	Cupid Stupid	TKO	3 (?)	Jan 2, 1909	Pastime A.C., Tacoma, Washington, US	
28	Win	17–8 (3)	Victor McLaglen	KO	3 (20)	Aug 10, 1908	Grand Theater, Aberdeen, Washington, US	
27	Win	16–8 (3)	Spike Kennedy	TKO	6 (10)	Nov 2, 1907	Coffroth's Arena, San Francisco, California, US	
26	Loss	15–8 (3)	Sam McVey	KO	16 (20)	Feb 28, 1907	Old Pavilion, Sacramento, California, US	
25	Loss	15–7 (3)	Tom Costello	KO	2 (4)	Jan 23, 1907	Old Pavilion, Sacramento, California, US	
24	Loss	15–6 (3)	Sam McVey	KO	4 (20)	Jan 25, 1906	National A.C., San Diego, California, US	
23	Win	15–5 (3)	Frank Childs	PTS	6	Nov 1, 1904	Exact location unknown	Exact date unknown
22	Loss	14–5 (3)	Jack Johnson	KO	2 (20)	Oct 18, 1903	Hazard's Pavilion, Los Angeles, California, US	For world colored heavyweight title
21	Win	14–4 (3)	Sam McVey	PTS	10	Aug 12, 1903	Hazard's Pavilion, Los Angeles, California, US	
20	Loss	13–4 (3)	Sam McVey	KO	1 (20)	Sep 15, 1903	Hazard's Pavilion, Los Angeles, California, US	
19	Loss	13–3 (3)	Bob Armstrong	KO	3 (12)	Jun 10, 1903	Tammany A.C., Boston, Massachusetts, US	
18	Loss	13–2 (3)	Jack Johnson	PTS	20	Feb 5, 1903	Hazard's Pavilion, Los Angeles, California, US	Lost world colored heavyweight title
17	Win	13–1 (3)	Bob Armstrong	NWS	6	Dec 10, 1902	Penn Art Club, Philadelphia, Pennsylvania, US	World colored heavyweight title at stake; (via KO only)
16	Win	13–1 (2)	Frank Craig	KO	4 (10)	Aug 30, 1902	Ginnetts Circus, Newcastle, Tyne and Wear, England, UK	Retained world colored heavyweight title
15	Win	12–1 (2)	Frank Craig	TKO	3 (10)	Aug 16, 1902	Ginnetts Circus, Newcastle, Tyne and Wear, England, UK	Retained world colored heavyweight title
14	Win	11–1 (2)	Bob Armstrong	PTS	15	Jul 25, 1902	Crystal Palace, Sydenham, London, England, UK	Retained world colored heavyweight title
13	Win	10–1 (2)	Sandy Ferguson	TKO	5 (15), 1:30	Jun 25, 1902	National Sporting Club, Covent Garden, London, England, UK	
12	Win	9–1 (2)	Frank Childs	PTS	6	Feb 24, 1902	American A.C., Chicago, Illinois, US	Won world colored heavyweight title; Both fighters claimed the title
11	Win	8–1 (2)	Hank Griffin	TKO	7 (20)	Oct 2, 1901	Hazard's Pavilion, Los Angeles, California, US	
10	Win	7–1 (2)	Fred Russell	DQ	10 (20)	Aug 12, 1901	Grand Opera House, Seattle, Washington, US	Russell DQ'd for kneeing Martin in the groin after being knocked down
9	Win	6–1 (2)	Denis Ike Hayes	TKO	2 (4)	Jul 17, 1901	Opera House, Butte, Montana, US	
8	Win	5–1 (2)	Yank Kenny	KO	1 (25), 1:30	Aug 31, 1900	Hercules A.C., New York City, New York, US	
7	Win	4–1 (2)	Jim Galvin	TKO	1 (25)	Aug 20, 1900	Hercules A.C., New York City, New York, US	
6	Win	3–1 (2)	Frank Skelley	KO	1 (10)	Jul 7, 1900	Sampson A.C., New York City, New York, US	
5	Draw	2–1 (2)	Bob Armstrong	NWS	6	Mar 23, 1900	Industrial Hall, Philadelphia, Pennsylvania, US	
4	Win	2–1 (1)	Klondike Haynes	NWS	6	Jan 27, 1900	Nonpareil A.C., Philadelphia, Pennsylvania, US	
3	Win	2–1	Walter Johnson	TKO	7 (20), 2:41	Aug 25, 1899	Broadway A.C., New York City, New York, US	
2	Win	1–1	Charley Stevenson	TKO	14 (15), 2:41	Jul 24, 1899	Coney Island A.C., New York City, New York, US	
1	Loss	0–1	Bob Armstrong	KO	2 (20)	Jun 6, 1899	Lenox A.C., New York City, New York, US	

=== Unofficial record ===
41 fights	23 wins	13 losses
By knockout	17	12
By decision	4	1
By disqualification	2	0
Draws	3	
No contests	2	

Record with the inclusion of newspaper decisions in the win/loss/draw column.

No.	Result	Record	Opponent	Type	Round, time	Date	Location	Notes
42	Loss	26–10–4 (2)	Harry Wills	KO	1 (10), 2:05	Nov 18, 1921	Arena, Milwaukie, Oregon, US	For world colored heavyweight title
41	Win	26–9–4 (2)	'Sergeant' Ray Smith	KO	3 (10)	Oct 19, 1921	Arena, Milwaukie, Oregon, US	
40	Win	25–9–4 (2)	Tiny Jim Herman	KO	4 (10)	Sep 21, 1921	Arena, Milwaukie, Oregon, US	
39	Win	24–9–4 (2)	Young Hector	KO	2 (10)	Sep 7, 1921	Arena, Milwaukie, Oregon, US	
38	Win	23–9–4 (2)	'Young' Sam McVey	TKO	3 (8)	Jan 31, 1916	Phoenix A.C., Memphis, Tennessee, US	
37	Loss	22–9–4 (2)	Tom Cowler	KO	2 (15)	Mar 7, 1914	Steveston, British Columbia, Canada	
36	Draw	22–8–4 (2)	Ed Hagen	PTS	6	Jul 3, 1913	Armory, Centralia, Washington, US	
35	Draw	22–8–3 (2)	White Hope	PTS	4	Mar 3, 1912	Location unknown	
34	NC	22–8–2 (2)	Tommy Ryan	NC	6	Nov 29, 1911	Armory, Portland, Oregon, US	
33	ND	22–8–2 (1)	Ed Hagen	ND	6	Feb 22, 1911	Elks Club, Everett, Washington, US	
32	Win	22–8–2	Ed Hagen	DQ	3 (4)	Jan 20, 1911	Empire Theatre, Seattle, Washington, US	Hagen DQ'd for headbutting
31	Win	21–8–2	Gunboat Smith	NWS	4	Jul 16, 1909	Arena, Seattle, Washington, US	
30	Draw	20–8–2	Benjamin Roller	PTS	6	Jan 19, 1909	Seattle Theater, Seattle, Washington, US	
29	Win	20–8–1	Cupid Stupid	TKO	3 (?)	Jan 2, 1909	Pastime A.C., Tacoma, Washington, US	
28	Win	19–8–1	Victor McLaglen	KO	3 (20)	Aug 10, 1908	Grand Theater, Aberdeen, Washington, US	
27	Win	18–8–1	Spike Kennedy	TKO	6 (10)	Nov 2, 1907	Coffroth's Arena, San Francisco, California, US	
26	Loss	17–8–1	Sam McVey	KO	16 (20)	Feb 28, 1907	Old Pavilion, Sacramento, California, US	
25	Loss	17–7–1	Tom Costello	KO	2 (4)	Jan 23, 1907	Old Pavilion, Sacramento, California, US	
24	Loss	17–6–1	Sam McVey	KO	4 (20)	Jan 25, 1906	National A.C., San Diego, California, US	
23	Win	17–5–1	Frank Childs	PTS	6	Nov 1, 1904	Exact location unknown	Exact date unknown
22	Loss	16–5–1	Jack Johnson	KO	2 (20)	Oct 18, 1903	Hazard's Pavilion, Los Angeles, California, US	For world colored heavyweight title
21	Win	16–4–1	Sam McVey	PTS	10	Aug 12, 1903	Hazard's Pavilion, Los Angeles, California, US	
20	Loss	15–4–1	Sam McVey	KO	1 (20)	Sep 15, 1903	Hazard's Pavilion, Los Angeles, California, US	
19	Loss	15–3–1	Bob Armstrong	KO	3 (12)	Jun 10, 1903	Tammany A.C., Boston, Massachusetts, US	
18	Loss	15–2–1	Jack Johnson	PTS	20	Feb 5, 1903	Hazard's Pavilion, Los Angeles, California, US	Lost world colored heavyweight title
17	Win	15–1–1	Bob Armstrong	NWS	6	Dec 10, 1902	Penn Art Club, Philadelphia, Pennsylvania, US	World colored heavyweight title at stake; (via KO only)
16	Win	14–1–1	Frank Craig	KO	4 (10)	Aug 30, 1902	Ginnetts Circus, Newcastle, Tyne and Wear, England, UK	Retained world colored heavyweight title
15	Win	13–1–1	Frank Craig	TKO	3 (10)	Aug 16, 1902	Ginnetts Circus, Newcastle, Tyne and Wear, England, UK	Retained world colored heavyweight title
14	Win	12–1–1	Bob Armstrong	PTS	15	Jul 25, 1902	Crystal Palace, Sydenham, London, England, UK	Retained world colored heavyweight title
13	Win	11–1–1	Sandy Ferguson	TKO	5 (15), 1:30	Jun 25, 1902	National Sporting Club, Covent Garden, London, England, UK	
12	Win	10–1–1	Frank Childs	PTS	6	Feb 24, 1902	American A.C., Chicago, Illinois, US	Won world colored heavyweight title; Both fighters claimed the title
11	Win	9–1–1	Hank Griffin	TKO	7 (20)	Oct 2, 1901	Hazard's Pavilion, Los Angeles, California, US	
10	Win	8–1–1	Fred Russell	DQ	10 (20)	Aug 12, 1901	Grand Opera House, Seattle, Washington, US	Russell DQ'd for kneeing Martin in the groin after being knocked down
9	Win	7–1–1	Denis Ike Hayes	TKO	2 (4)	Jul 17, 1901	Opera House, Butte, Montana, US	
8	Win	6–1–1	Yank Kenny	KO	1 (25), 1:30	Aug 31, 1900	Hercules A.C., New York City, New York, US	
7	Win	5–1–1	Jim Galvin	TKO	1 (25)	Aug 20, 1900	Hercules A.C., New York City, New York, US	
6	Win	4–1–1	Frank Skelley	KO	1 (10)	Jul 7, 1900	Sampson A.C., New York City, New York, US	
5	Draw	3–1–1	Bob Armstrong	NWS	6	Mar 23, 1900	Industrial Hall, Philadelphia, Pennsylvania, US	
4	Win	3–1	Klondike Haynes	NWS	6	Jan 27, 1900	Nonpareil A.C., Philadelphia, Pennsylvania, US	
3	Win	2–1	Walter Johnson	TKO	7 (20), 2:41	Aug 25, 1899	Broadway A.C., New York City, New York, US	
2	Win	1–1	Charley Stevenson	TKO	14 (15), 2:41	Jul 24, 1899	Coney Island A.C., New York City, New York, US	
1	Loss	0–1	Bob Armstrong	KO	2 (20)	Jun 6, 1899	Lenox A.C., New York City, New York, US	

Awards and achievements
Preceded by Frank Childs	World Colored Heavyweight Champion; February 24, 1902 – February 5, 1903	Succeeded by Jack Johnson
