= George Gardiner (boxer) =

Irish boxer (1877–1954)

George Gardner
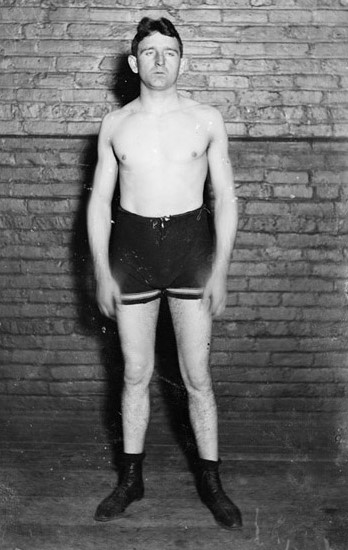

Personal information
- Nationality: Irish (Note: Every Irish born before 1922 is a British citizen. Ireland was part of the United Kingdom until 1922.)
- Born: George Gardner; March 17, 1877 Lisdoonvarna, County Clare, Ireland, United Kingdom of Great Britain and Ireland
- Died: July 8, 1954 (aged 77) Chicago, Illinois, U.S.
- Height: 5 ft 11 1/2 in (1.816 m)
- Weight: Middleweight Light-heavyweight Heavyweight

Boxing career
- Stance: Orthodox

Boxing record
- Total fights: 68
- Wins: 45
- Win by KO: 31
- Losses: 11
- Draws: 9
- No contests: 1

George Gardner (March 17, 1877 – July 8, 1954) was an Irish-American boxer who was the second world light-heavyweight champion in the division's history. He held claims to both the world middleweight title as well as the world heavyweight title. He won the light-heavyweight title after defeating its inaugural champion, Jack Root, by KO after 12 rounds.

== Background ==
Gardner was born on March 17, 1877, in County Clare, Ireland, on Saint Patrick's Day. He was believed to have been the son of an Irish prizefighter and came from poverty. George and his brothers, Billy and Jimmy Gardner, were each recognized as accomplished boxers in their era.

George Gardner's name is often misspelled "George Gardiner," which was an alias, although some believe it was the correct spelling. He signed his name "George Gardner", though several newspapers of his era spelled his name "George Gardiner." However, his brother, Jimmy Gardner, signed his name "Jimmy Gardiner" when handing out autographs.

== Professional career ==
Gardner began his career in 1897 when he was 20 years old. He was almost six feet tall and weighed between 150–175 pounds during his career. He won several fights in the New England area, being noted in newspapers as the "Middleweight Champion of New England."

=== Middleweight champion of the world ===
Gardner was the top middleweight contender in 1901 and claimed the world middleweight title that year. He defeated Frank Craig, the world colored middleweight champion, in London, England, and newspapers declared that Gardner "secured the World Middleweight Title." Afterwards, Gardner challenged Tommy Ryan for the title, but Ryan declined despite being the number one contender for the title.

Gardner first openly claimed the middleweight title on August 30, 1901, at the Mechanic's Pavilion in San Francisco after knocking out Kid Carter in a fight billed as the "Middleweight Championship of the World." He then defeated Joe Walcott, the welterweight champion of the world, in a 20-round rematch in 1902. On August 18, 1902, Gardner TKO'd the undefeated Jack Root in 17 rounds at Salt Lake City, Utah, in a close fight billed as both the light-heavyweight and middleweight world championship. Both fighters weighed in at 165 pounds.

On October 31, 1902, Gardner fought 20 rounds with Jack Johnson, the first African American to hold the world heavyweight title. Gardner weighed in at 155 while Johnson held a 30-pound weight advantage at 185. Johnson won on points by knocking Gardner down twice in the 8th and 14th rounds.

=== Light-heavyweight champion of the world ===
Gardner was a contender for the newly created world light-heavyweight title in 1903, weighing about 170 pounds. On April 6, 1903, Gardner fought Peter Maher, the Irish heavyweight champion, considered to be one of the most dangerous hitters of his era. Gardner knocked out Maher in round one and then defeated Marvin Hart by TKO after 12 rounds.

On July 4, 1903, at Ontario, Canada, at the International Athletic Club, after 12 rounds of fighting, George Gardner knocked out Jack Root to take his light-heavyweight title. He was the first Irish-American to hold the title. Most records state that Root was the first champion of the division, but others, including George Gardner, had claimed the title before. The Root–Gardner fight was the first light-heavyweight title fight caught on film. Newspapers reported that Gardner knocked Root down seven times.

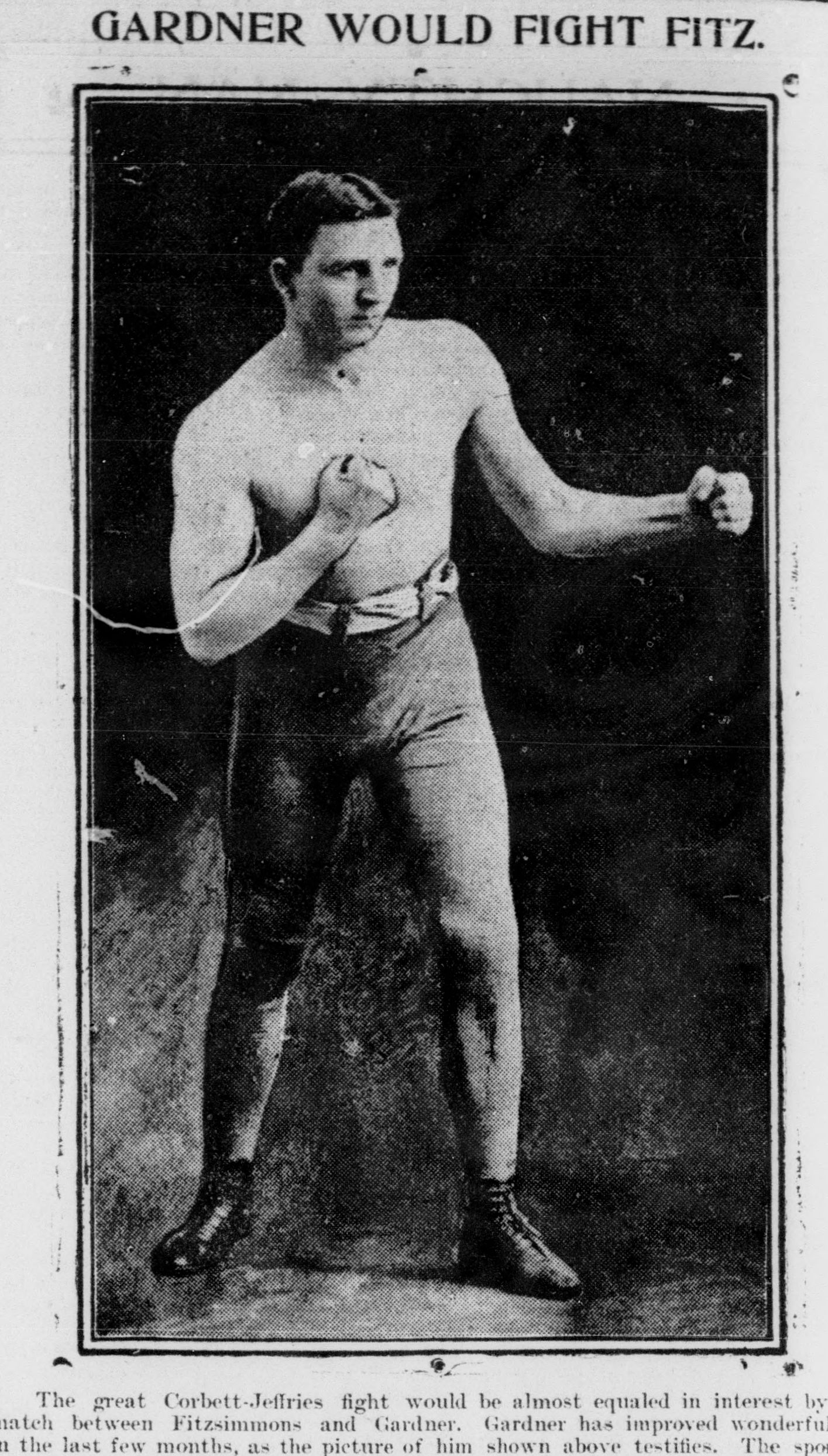
In 1903, George Gardner said he would fight Fitz.

George Gardner defended his title later that year on November 25, 1903, at San Francisco, California, against Bob Fitzsimmons, who had killed two men in the ring and was the former middleweight and heavyweight champion. Fitzsimmons knocked the young champion down twice and won a questionable 20-round division, becoming boxing's first triple-division champion as well as the first champion at both heavyweight and light-heavyweight. After losing the title, George Gardner challenged Fitzsimmons to a rematch, but was denied a second chance at the title.

Gardner was still a highly regarded contender in his division, and was rated even higher than the champion Fitzsimmons. Nonetheless, Gardner set his sights on the world heavyweight title. It was held by Marvin Hart, whom Gardner had defeated and drawn with before.

Gardner challenged Marvin Hart for the heavyweight championship, but again he was denied a title shot. Afterwards, his career faded with losses and draws against Jim Flynn, Al Kaufman, Terry Mustain, and Tony Ross. Gardner retired at age 32 in 1908 with an official record of 44 wins, 32 by way of knockout, 12 losses, 7 draws, and 3 no contests.

Gardner continued to box, but considered himself a "washed-up prize fighter." He was reputed to have fought in over 300 battles. One newspaper source noted that Gardner "had drawn from their seats in applause more fight fans than any other light-heavyweight."

== Later life ==
Gardner opened a saloon in Chicago and married Margaret Smith of South Bend, Indiana. He fathered a son in 1905, who also became a professional boxer in the light-heavyweight division under the name, "Morgan Gardiner." Gardner's brother, Jimmy Gardner, claimed the world welterweight title in 1908, making the Gardner brothers the first Irish-American siblings in world history to hold world titles.

George Gardner was pictured in the summer of 1930 on the front of "Self Defense Quarterly."

Gardner was once ranked the #1 fighter in the world and he is considered one of the top fighters of all time, as well as one of the top light-heavyweights of all time.

Gardner died at age 77 on July 10, 1954, in Chicago. Four ex-champions were pallbearers at his funeral.

== Professional boxing record ==
68 fights	43 wins	11 losses
By knockout	31	6
By decision	9	4
By disqualification	3	1
Draws	8	
No contests	4	
Newspaper decisions/draws	2	

All newspaper decisions are officially regarded as “no decision” bouts and are not counted in the win/loss/draw column.

No.	Result	Record	Opponent	Type	Round	Date	Location	Notes
68	Draw	43–11–8 (6)	John Willie	PTS	10	Sep 5, 1908	Winnipeg, Manitoba, Canada	
67	Loss	43–11–7 (6)	Tony Ross	TKO	7 (12)	May 18, 1908	Coliseum, New Castle, Pennsylvania, U.S.	
66	Loss	43–10–7 (6)	Terry Mustain	KO	8 (20)	Jan 29, 1908	Bay City A.C., San Diego, California, U.S.	
65	Draw	43–9–7 (6)	Terry Mustain	PTS	20	Oct 12, 1907	San Diego, California, U.S.	
64	Loss	43–9–6 (6)	Fireman Jim Flynn	KO	18 (20)	Apr 17, 1907	National Athletic Club, San Diego, California, U.S.	
63	Loss	43–8–6 (6)	Al Kaufman	TKO	14 (20)	Dec 21, 1906	Naud Junction Pavilion, Los Angeles, California, U.S.	
62	NC	43–7–6 (6)	Mike Schreck	NC	2 (15)	Apr 19, 1906	Lincoln A.C., Chelsea, Massachusetts, U.S.	
61	Win	43–7–6 (5)	Jim Jeffords	NWS	6	Jan 24, 1906	National A.C., Philadelphia, Pennsylvania, U.S.	
60	Win	43–7–6 (4)	Billy Stift	KO	5 (20)	Jun 19, 1905	Grand Opera House, Ogden, Utah, U.S.	
59	Loss	42–7–6 (4)	Mike Schreck	TKO	20 (20)	Apr 17, 1905	Salt Lake Theater, Salt Lake City, Utah, U.S.	
58	Draw	42–6–6 (4)	Fireman Jim Flynn	PTS	10	Sep 16, 1904	Denver A.C., Denver, Colorado, U.S.	
57	Win	42–6–5 (4)	Jim Jeffords	KO	3 (20)	Aug 15, 1904	Butte, Montana, U.S.	
56	Win	41–6–5 (4)	Denis Ike Hayes	PTS	4	Aug 5, 1904	Anaconda, Montana, U.S.	
55	Draw	40–6–5 (4)	John Willie	PTS	6	Jul 1, 1904	Battery D Armory, Chicago, Illinois, U.S.	
54	Loss	40–6–4 (4)	Jack Root	PTS	6	May 2, 1904	Waverly A.C., Chicago, Illinois, U.S.	
53	Draw	40–5–4 (4)	Jack Root	PTS	6	Feb 26, 1904	Battery D Armory, Chicago, Illinois, U.S.	
52	Win	40–5–3 (4)	Kid Carter	UD	6	Feb 19, 1904	Milwaukee Boxing Club, Milwaukee, Wisconsin, U.S.	
51	Win	39–5–3 (4)	Fred Cooley	PTS	6	Feb 8, 1904	Watita Hall, Chicago, Illinois, U.S.	
50	Win	38–5–3 (4)	Jim Driscoll	PTS	6	Feb 8, 1904	Watita Hall, Chicago, Illinois, U.S.	
49	Draw	37–5–3 (4)	Marvin Hart	PTS	15	Jan 5, 1904	Criterion A.C., Boston, Massachusetts, U.S.	
48	Loss	37–5–2 (4)	Bob Fitzsimmons	PTS	20	Nov 25, 1903	Mechanic's Pavilion, San Francisco, California, U.S.	Lost world light-heavyweight title
47	Win	37–4–2 (4)	Jack Root	TKO	12 (20)	Jul 4, 1903	International A.C., Fort Erie, Ontario, Canada	Won world light-heavyweight title
46	Win	36–4–2 (4)	Marvin Hart	RTD	12 (20)	May 13, 1903	Auditorium, Louisville, Kentucky, U.S.	Billed World & American 170lbs titles
45	Win	35–4–2 (4)	Peter Maher	KO	1 (6)	Apr 6, 1903	Maverick AC, Boston, Massachusetts, U.S.	
44	Win	34–4–2 (4)	Al Weinig	TKO	6 (?)	Feb 13, 1903	Maverick AC, Boston, Massachusetts, U.S.	
43	NC	33–4–2 (4)	Bob Armstrong	NC	4 (6)	Feb 9, 1903	Washington S.C., Philadelphia, Pennsylvania, U.S.	
42	Win	33–4–2 (3)	Kid Carter	PTS	6	Dec 29, 1902	Lyceum A.C., Chicago, Illinois, U.S.	
41	Win	32–4–2 (3)	Billy Stift	UD	6	Dec 11, 1902	Aurora Hall, Chicago, Illinois, U.S.	
40	Loss	31–4–2 (3)	Jack Johnson	PTS	20	Oct 31, 1902	Woodward's Pavilion, San Francisco, California, U.S.	
39	Win	31–3–2 (3)	Jack Root	TKO	17 (20)	Aug 18, 1902	Saucer Track, Salt Lake City, Utah, U.S.	
38	Win	30–3–2 (3)	Barbados Joe Walcott	PTS	20	Apr 25, 1902	Woodward's Pavilion, San Francisco, California, U.S.	
37	Loss	29–3–2 (3)	Jack Root	DQ	7 (20)	Jan 1, 1902	Mechanic's Pavilion, San Francisco, California, U.S.	
36	Win	29–2–2 (3)	Kid Carter	KO	8 (20)	Dec 20, 1901	Mechanic's Pavilion, San Francisco, California, U.S.	Advertised as for world middleweight championship
35	Loss	28–2–2 (3)	Barbados Joe Walcott	PTS	20	Sep 27, 1901	Mechanic's Pavilion, San Francisco, California, U.S.	
34	Win	28–1–2 (3)	Kid Carter	TKO	18 (20)	Aug 30, 1901	Mechanic's Pavilion, San Francisco, California, U.S.	Advertised as for world middleweight championship
33	Win	27–1–2 (3)	Jack Moffat	TKO	3 (20)	Jul 4, 1901	San Francisco A.C., San Francisco, California, U.S.	Billed World & American 158lbs middleweight titles
32	Win	26–1–2 (3)	Tim Hurley	TKO	5 (?)	Apr 8, 1901	Manchester, New Hampshire, U.S.	
31	NC	25–1–2 (3)	Jack Scales	ND	3	Sep 29, 1900	Beresford Street Drill Hall, Woolwich, London, England	
30	Win	25–1–2 (2)	Frank Craig	DQ	4 (20)	Sep 10, 1900	Wonderland, Whitechapel Road, Mile End, London, England	Craig was disqualified for throwing Gardiner
29	Win	24–1–2 (2)	Kid Carter	DQ	19 (25)	May 29, 1900	Seaside A.C., Brooklyn, New York City, New York, U.S.	Carter was disqualified for butting
28	NC	23–1–2 (2)	George Byers	NC	15	May 14, 1900	Roanoke A.C., Boston, Massachusetts, U.S.	
27	Win	23–1–2 (1)	Charles Goff	TKO	7 (?)	May 2, 1900	Utica, New York, U.S.	
26	Win	22–1–2 (1)	Wild Bill Hanrahan	TKO	9 (15)	Apr 23, 1900	Casco A.C., Portland, Oregon, U.S.	
25	Win	21–1–2 (1)	Dick Baker	TKO	4 (?)	Apr 19, 1900	Greenwood Park, Manchester, New Hampshire, U.S.	
24	Win	20–1–2 (1)	J Fitzpatrick	TKO	9 (?)	Apr 17, 1900	Portland, Oregon, U.S.	
23	Win	19–1–2 (1)	Jack Burke	TKO	4 (15)	Mar 14, 1900	Kirtland Club, Lynn, Massachusetts, U.S.	
22	Win	18–1–2 (1)	George Byers	DQ	14 (15)	Feb 22, 1900	Coliseum, Hartford, Connecticut, U.S.	
21	Win	17–1–2 (1)	Jimmy Handler	TKO	3 (25)	Feb 12, 1900	Hercules A.C., Brooklyn, New York City, New York, U.S.	
20	Draw	16–1–2 (1)	George Byers	NWS	15	Feb 2, 1900	Lasters Hall, Lynn, Massachusetts, U.S.	Pre-arranged draw if went the distance
19	Win	16–1–2	Harry Fisher	TKO	12 (?)	Jan 9, 1900	Kirkland A.C., Lynn, Massachusetts, U.S.	
18	Win	15–1–2	Jack Moffat	RTD	8 (25)	Dec 12, 1899	Broadway A.C., Brooklyn, New York City, New York, U.S.	
17	Loss	14–1–2	Jimmy Handler	TKO	18 (25)	Oct 16, 1899	Hercules A.C., Brooklyn, New York City, New York, U.S.	
16	Win	14–0–2	Harry Fisher	TKO	17 (20)	Aug 5, 1899	Pelican A.C., Brooklyn, New York City, New York, U.S.	
15	Draw	13–0–2	Dick Sims	PTS	7 (15)	Jul 31, 1899	Associate Hall, Lowell, Massachusetts, U.S.	referee declared the bout a draw because of police interference
14	Win	13–0–1	Young Sharkey	TKO	9 (?)	Jun 7, 1899	Nutone A.C., Lowell, Massachusetts, U.S.	
13	Win	12–0–1	John E Butler	TKO	7 (15)	May 9, 1899	Nutone A.C., Lowell, Massachusetts, U.S.	
12	Win	11–0–1	Andy Moynahan	KO	3 (?)	Mar 24, 1899	Greenwood Park, Manchester, New Hampshire, U.S.	
11	Draw	10–0–1	Bob Montgomery	PTS	10	Jan 20, 1899	Manchester, New Hampshire, U.S.	
10	Win	10–0	Charles C. Smith	KO	7 (?)	Dec 25, 1898	Montreal, Quebec, Canada	
9	Win	9–0	Professor Evans	TKO	3 (?)	Dec 10, 1898	Manchester, New Hampshire, U.S.	
8	Win	8–0	Hugh HJ Colgren	KO	3 (?)	Nov 20, 1898	Manchester, New Hampshire, U.S.	
7	Win	7–0	Hugh McWinters	KO	6 (?)	May 20, 1898	Manchester, New Hampshire, U.S.	
6	Win	6–0	Tom O'Brien	KO	1 (?)	Apr 27, 1898	Manchester, New Hampshire, U.S.	
5	Win	5–0	Tom Moore	KO	4 (?)	Apr 10, 1898	Manchester, New Hampshire, U.S.	
4	Win	4–0	J Young	KO	2 (?)	Mar 17, 1898	Manchester, New Hampshire, U.S.	
3	Win	3–0	J Young	KO	3 (?)	Mar 10, 1898	Manchester, New Hampshire, U.S.	
2	Win	2–0	Matt Leary	PTS	4	Mar 7, 1898	Manchester, New Hampshire, U.S.	
1	Win	1–0	Hugh HJ Colgren	PTS	4	Nov 5, 1897	Gymnasium A.C., Manchester, New Hampshire, U.S.	

== See also ==
- List of light heavyweight boxing champions
- List of bare-knuckle boxers
- List of light heavyweight boxing champions

== Notes ==
Awards and achievements
Preceded by Jack Root	World Light Heavyweight Champion; July 4, 1903 – November 25, 1903	Succeeded by Bob Fitzsimmons
