= Hank Griffin =

Hank Griffin may refer to

- Hank Griffin (boxer), a boxer of the 1890s and early 1900s
- Hank Griffin (baseball), a baseball pitcher of the 1910s
