= James Bagnall =

Canadian printer, publisher and politician

James Bagnall (bap. 16 November 1783 – 20 June 1855) was a printer, publisher and politician in Prince Edward Island.

Born in Shelburne, Nova Scotia, he was the son of United Empire Loyalists from New York. His family settled in Charlottetown, Prince Edward Island around 1787.

Bagnall received a limited education on the island but apprenticed with his brother-in-law, a printer, who left Prince Edward Island for the United States. There, Bagnall received experience on two newspapers that his brother-in-law published.

He returned to Prince Edward Island in 1804 with a printing press and was appointed King's Printer by the Lieutenant Governor, Edmund Fanning. The newspaper business was unprofitable but better arrangements were made for government printing with Joseph Frederick Wallet DesBarres, the new Lieutenant Governor.

Bagnall made a successful entry into colonial politics with his election to the General Assembly in 1808. However, the economics of the printing business in such a small center made him leave briefly for Nova Scotia where he had limited success with two newspapers.

Bagnall returned to Prince Edward Island in 1810 and, from that point onward, struggled to keep his printing business viable. He also returned to politics with some success but his main accomplishments were as a printer. By that endeavour, he ensured that the colony was kept informed through his printed material. In 1813, he competed and won against Samuel Martin (better known as "Black Sam") for land in the neighbourhood formerly known as The Bog
