= The Bog, Charlottetown =

19th-century community in Charlottetown, Canada

Coordinates: 46.233°N 63.132°W

The Bog is a former neighbourhood in Charlottetown, Prince Edward Island, Canada. The community was settled in the early 19th century by Black people who were enslaved, who had been brought to the colony by their Loyalist enslavers after the American Revolutionary War. The neighbourhood was bounded by Euston, Pownal, Richmond, and West streets, and by Government Pond. The neighbourhood was demolished for a redevelopment project in the early 20th century.

== History ==
On 11 August 1812, Samuel Martin (c. 1750–16 November 1863), a freed slave known as "Black Sam", petitioned the Charlottetown government for a parcel of land in the city's west end, adjacent to Government Pond and across from land set aside for the future Government House. While Martin was never formally granted the parcel, the low-lying, marshy land was seen as undesirable by the city's wealthy residents, and a group of freed slaves eventually settled in the area. The land's low value also attracted other impoverished people of Prince Edward Island, and over time the area became a mixed-race slum with a peak population of about 100 residents.

A central feature of the Bog was the Bog School, constructed in 1848 on Kent Street on land donated by Royal Navy Captain John Orlebar. Local legislation did not require the Bog School to be a racially segregated school, due to the small Black population. After renovations in 1868, the school was expanded and renamed the West End School. African-Canadian teacher Sarah Harvie was the school's only teacher, and the school closed upon her retirement in 1903. By the time of the school's closure, the demographics of the neighbourhood had evolved, as the original Black residents intermarried with white families or migrated to more robust Black communities in the United States. According to P.E.I.'s 1881 census, there were only 84 Black residents living in the neighbourhood. The Bog was shortly after demolished for a redevelopment project. Today, the geographical area consists of government buildings, a parking lot from the 1960s, and residential housing. The Bog has never been recognized as part of Black Canadian heritage by the government.

Another prominent community gathering place was the Victoria Jubilee Club, which was created in 1887. Government Pond was a site the community used for skating, shinny, and ice hockey.

== Notable people ==
- George Godfrey, former World Colored Heavyweight champion boxer
- George Byers (boxer born June 25, 1872), former World Colored Middleweight and World Colored Heavyweight champion boxer
- James Bagnall

== See also ==
- Africville
- Black Nova Scotians
- Colored Hockey League
