= Frank Childs =

American boxer

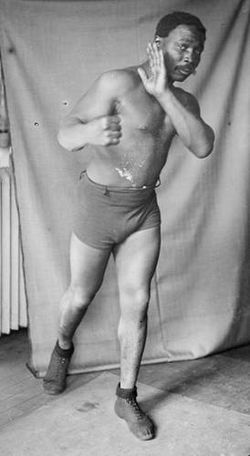
- Childs in a pre-fight promotional photograph (date unknown)

Personal information
- Nickname: The Crafty Texan
- Nationality: American
- Born: July 17, 1867 Texas
- Died: June 20, 1936 (aged 68) Waukegan, Illinois
- Height: 5 ft 9.5 in (1.77 m)
- Weight: Heavyweight

Boxing career
- Stance: Orthodox

Boxing record
- Total fights: 57
- Wins: 40
- Win by KO: 24
- Losses: 9
- Draws: 8

Frank Childs (born July 17, 1867, Texas; died June 20, 1936, Waukegan, Illinois), "The Crafty Texan", was an African American boxer who fought professionally out of Chicago from 1892 to 1911 and twice held the World Colored Heavyweight Championship. Fighting at a weight of between 160 and 185 lbs., the short, stocky Childs fought middleweights, light-heavyweights and heavyweights. He had a powerful punch.

== Journeyman ==
He made his pro boxing debut on February 18, 1892 in Los Angeles against French Canadian George LaBlanche from Quebec, knocking him out in the third round. They fought again on March 24, with four-ounce gloves. In the eighth round, LaBlanche grabbed Childs by the waist, threw him to the canvas, and then kicked him. The badly hurt Childs got up and wrestled LaBlanche, putting him in a half-nelson before elevating LaBlanche and throwing him. The police stopped the fight and the referee awarded Childs the decision after disqualifying LaBlanche.

Childs fought 15 more bouts before getting a shot at the colored heavyweight title. Along the way, he fought Bob Armstrong, the colored heavyweight champ, in a six-round non-title contest held on March 7, 1897 in Philadelphia. Childs won on points. His fight before that had been with white heavyweight contender Joe Choynski (the mentor of future colored heavyweight and world heavyweight title-holder Jack Johnson), who won by knockout (K.O.) in the third of a three-round fight.

In the intervening thirteen months before Armstrong gave him a shot for the title, Childs squared off on January 8, 1898 at Chicago's 2nd Regiment Armory against a boxer named Klondike (real name John Haines or John W. Haynes), so called because he was supposed to be a great find (evoking the Klondike Gold Rush). It was Klondike's first fight, and he was K.O.-ed by Childs. Klondike would go on to beat future world heavyweight champ Jack Johnson in Johnson's third pro fight and claim what he called the "Black Heavyweight Championship".

Childs and Klondike would meet again, frequently, as African American boxers were forced to fight one another often due to the color bar.

== World Colored Heavyweight Champ ==
Childs first fought for the World Colored Heavyweight crown on January 29, 1898, knocking out colored champion Bob Armstrong in the second round. On February 26, he defended the title against Klondike on a technical knock-out in the fourth round of a scheduled six-round bout. In another six-round defense held in Chicago on June 3, he retained the title by drawing with Charley Strong, who had fought Armstrong for the title vacated by Peter Jackson.

In his next fight on September 4 of that year, he lost the title to George Byers on points in a 20-rounder. Regardless of losing the title, Childs fought Armstrong again on March 4, 1899 in Cincinnati, Ohio in a fight announced as a title bout, despite Byers being the legitimate champion. Childs defeated Armstrong via a TKO in the sixth round of a 10-round bout.

On August 11, 1899, he won the "Black Heavyweight Championship" claimed by Klondike Haynes in a six-round contest in Chicago by outpointing the so-called "Black Hercules". On October 28 of that year, they met in a rematch in Chicago in which Childs retained the black heavyweight title by kayoing Haynes in the third round of a six-round contest.

On March 16, 1900, Childs put his black heavyweight title on the line and Byers put up his coloured heavyweight crown in a six-round bout that ended in a draw. He next fought Joe Butler on December 15, 1900 for the black heavyweight title, dispatching Butler via KO in the sixth. Finally, he took back the Coloured World Heavyweight Championship legitimately from Byers on March 16, 1901 in Hot Springs, Arkansas, kayoing him in the 17th round of a 20-round fight. (He did not put up his black heavyweight title, which he never claimed again.)

He lost the coloured heavyweight title to Denver Ed Martin in a bout in Chicago on February 25, 1902, being out-pointed in a six-round contest. Not one to surrender a title easily, he billed his October 9, 1902 fight with Joe Walcott as a defence of his coloured heavyweight title. He beat Walcott via a TKO in the 3rd round when Walcott quit, claiming that he was injured. Childs was winning the fight at the time.

== Requiem for a Heavyweight ==
Jack Johnson eliminated any pretensions Childs had to the colored crown when he beat him via TKO in the 12th round of a fight on October 21, 1902 in Los Angeles. Childs's corner claimed he dislocated his elbow. He lost to Joe Choynski on December 1, 1902, being outpointed in a six-rounder. After a 16-month lay-off, he beat Chicago Jack Johnson (not the future champion) on successive days in March 1904, knocking him out in the 2nd both times.

The real Jack Johnson had won the colored heavyweight title from Denver Ed Martin on February 5, 1903, and June 2, 1904 in Chicago, the two champs, the reigning champion and the two-time former champion, met in a six-round bout. Johnson won on points.

He met up with old adversary Klondike Haynes on July 7 of that year and KO'd him in the 8th. There was no talk of championships, colored or black. Jack Johnson was the champ. After losing on points to Denver Ed Martin in a six-rounder on November 1, he retired. He came back six years later and fought tyro light-heavyweight Horace "Jack" Taylor on February 2, 1911. The six-round bout, Taylor's second pro fight, resulted in a draw.

== Record ==
In a career that stretched from 1892 to 1911, he racked up a career record of 41 wins (25 by knockout) against nine losses (being KO-ed three times) and eight draws.

== Legacy and honors ==
In 2020 award-winning author Mark Allen Baker published the first comprehensive account of The World Colored Heavyweight Championship, 1876-1937, with McFarland & Company, a leading independent publisher of academic & nonfiction books. This history traces the advent and demise of the Championship, the stories of the talented professional athletes who won it, and the demarcation of the color line both in and out of the ring.

For decades the World Colored Heavyweight Championship was a useful tool to combat racial oppression-the existence of the title a leverage mechanism, or tool, used as a technique to counter a social element, “drawing the color line.”

== Professional boxing record ==
57 fights	40 wins	9 losses
By knockout	24	2
By decision	14	6
By disqualification	2	1
Draws	8	

No.	Result	Record	Opponent	Type	Round, time	Date	Age	Location	Notes
57	Draw	40–9–8	Jack Taylor	PTS	6	Feb 2, 1911	43 years, 200 days	Exact location unknown, US	Exact date unknown
56	Loss	40–9–7	Denver Ed Martin	PTS	6	Nov 1, 1904	37 years, 107 days	Exact location unknown, US	Exact date unknown
55	Win	40–8–7	Klondike Haynes	KO	8 (?)	Jul 6, 1904	36 years, 355 days	Houghton, Michigan, US	
54	Loss	39–8–7	Jack Johnson	PTS	6	Jun 2, 1904	36 years, 321 days	Apollo Hall, Chicago, Illinois, US	For world colored heavyweight title
53	Win	39–7–7	Chicago Jack Johnson	KO	2 (6)	Mar 14, 1904	36 years, 241 days	American A.C., Chicago, Illinois, US	
52	Loss	38–7–7	Joe Choynski	PTS	6	Dec 1, 1902	35 years, 137 days	Lyceum A.C., Chicago, Illinois, US	
51	Loss	38–6–7	Jack Johnson	TKO	12 (20)	Oct 21, 1902	35 years, 96 days	Hazard's Pavilion, Los Angeles, California, US	Lost world colored heavyweight title claim
50	Win	38–5–7	Barbados Joe Walcott	TKO	3 (6)	Oct 9, 1902	35 years, 84 days	Apollo A.C., Chicago, Illinois, US	Retained world colored heavyweight title claim
49	Loss	37–5–7	Denver Ed Martin	PTS	6	Feb 24, 1902	34 years, 222 days	America A.A., Chicago, Illinois, US	Lost world colored heavyweight title; Both fighters claimed the title
48	Win	37–4–7	Wild Bill Hanrahan	KO	4 (6)	Feb 3, 1902	34 years, 201 days	America A.A., Chicago, Illinois, US	
47	Win	36–4–7	Walter Johnson	PTS	6	Jan 18, 1902	34 years, 185 days	America A.A., Chicago, Illinois, US	
46	Win	35–4–7	Jack Mulligan	TKO	5 (?)	Jan 6, 1902	34 years, 173 days	Kenosha, Wisconsin, US	
45	Win	34–4–7	George Byers	KO	17 (20)	Mar 16, 1901	33 years, 242 days	Hot Springs, Colorado, US	Won world colored heavyweight title
44	Win	33–4–7	'Mexican' Pete Everett	PTS	10	Dec 21, 1900	33 years, 157 days	Colorado A.C., Denver, Colorado, US	
43	Win	32–4–7	Joe Butler	KO	6 (6)	Dec 15, 1900	33 years, 151 days	Chicago A.A., Chicago, Illinois, US	Retained black heavyweight title
42	Win	31–4–7	Fred Russell	PTS	10	Jul 20, 1900	33 years, 3 days	Colorado A.C., Denver, Colorado, US	
41	Win	30–4–7	Fred Russell	PTS	6	Jun 15, 1900	32 years, 333 days	Star Theatre, Chicago, Illinois, US	
40	Win	29–4–7	Fred Russell	PTS	6	Jun 8, 1900	32 years, 326 days	Star Theatre, Chicago, Illinois, US	
39	Win	28–4–7	Tommy Dixon	KO	2 (6)	Apr 27, 1900	32 years, 284 days	Star Theatre, Chicago, Illinois, US	
38	Draw	27–4–7	Jack Bonner	PTS	6	Mar 17, 1900	32 years, 243 days	Chicago A.C., Chicago, Illinois, US	
37	Draw	27–4–6	George Byers	PTS	6	Mar 16, 1900	32 years, 242 days	Star A.C., Chicago, Illinois, US	Retained black heavyweight title; For world colored heavyweight title
36	Win	27–4–5	Jack Bonner	PTS	6	Mar 2, 1900	32 years, 228 days	Tattersall's, Chicago, Illinois, US	
35	Win	26–4–5	Klondike Haynes	KO	3 (6)	Oct 28, 1899	32 years, 103 days	Chicago A.A., Chicago, Illinois, US	Retained black heavyweight title
34	Draw	25–4–5	Joe Kennedy	PTS	6	Oct 13, 1899	32 years, 88 days	Star Theatre, Chicago, Illinois, US	
33	Win	25–4–4	Klondike Haynes	PTS	6	Aug 11, 1899	32 years, 25 days	Star Theatre, Chicago, Illinois, US	Won black heavyweight title
32	Draw	24–4–4	Tom 'Stockings' Conroy	PTS	6	May 26, 1899	31 years, 313 days	Tattersall's, Chicago, Illinois, US	
31	Draw	24–4–3	Jack Bonner	PTS	6	May 19, 1899	31 years, 306 days	Star Theatre, Chicago, Illinois, US	
30	Win	24–4–2	'Mexican' Pete Everett	PTS	6	Mar 24, 1899	31 years, 250 days	Star Theatre, Chicago, Illinois, US	
29	Win	23–4–2	Ed Dunkhorst	PTS	8	Mar 20, 1899	31 years, 246 days	Cadillac A.C., Detroit, Michigan, US	
28	Win	22–4–2	Bob Armstrong	TKO	6 (10)	Mar 4, 1899	31 years, 230 days	Stag A.C., Cincinnati, Ohio, US	Claimed vacant world colored heavyweight title
27	Win	21–4–2	Joe Butler	DQ	2 (6)	Jan 21, 1899	31 years, 188 days	Tattersall's, Chicago, Illinois, US	Butler DQ'd for hitting in the clinches despite both men having agreed not to
26	Win	20–4–2	Tom 'Stockings' Conroy	PTS	6	Dec 19, 1898	31 years, 155 days	Fort Dearborn A.C., Chicago, Illinois, US	
25	Win	19–4–2	Charley Strong	PTS	6	Nov 8, 1898	31 years, 114 days	Chicago, Illinois, US	
24	Win	18–4–2	Henry Baker	KO	3 (6)	Sep 24, 1898	31 years, 69 days	America A.A., Chicago, Illinois, US	
23	Loss	17–4–2	George Byers	PTS	20	Sep 14, 1898	31 years, 59 days	Lenox A.C., New York City, New York, US	Lost world colored heavyweight title
22	Draw	17–3–2	Charley Strong	PTS	6	Jun 3, 1898	30 years, 321 days	Tattersall's, Chicago, Illinois, US	Retained world colored heavyweight title
21	Win	17–3–1	Billy Keough	KO	1 (6)	Apr 16, 1898	30 years, 273 days	Chicago A.A., Chicago, Illinois, US	
20	Win	16–3–1	Klondike Haynes	TKO	4 (6)	Feb 26, 1898	30 years, 224 days	Chicago A.A., Chicago, Illinois, US	Retained world colored heavyweight title
19	Win	15–3–1	George Grant	PTS	6	Feb 7, 1898	30 years, 205 days	America A.A., Chicago, Illinois, US	
18	Win	14–3–1	Bob Armstrong	KO	2 (6)	Jan 29, 1898	30 years, 196 days	Chicago A.A., Chicago, Illinois, US	Won world colored heavyweight title
17	Win	13–3–1	Klondike Haynes	KO	6 (6)	Jan 8, 1898	30 years, 175 days	2nd Regiment Armory, Chicago, Illinois, US	
16	Win	12–3–1	George Grant	KO	1 (?)	Nov 1, 1897	30 years, 107 days	McGurn's Handball Court, Chicago, Illinois, US	
15	Win	11–3–1	Kentucky Rosebud	KO	3 (?)	Aug 2, 1897	30 years, 16 days	Saint Joseph, Missouri, US	
14	Win	10–3–1	Bob Armstrong	PTS	6	Mar 7, 1897	29 years, 233 days	Philadelphia, Pennsylvania, US	
13	Loss	9–3–1	Joe Choynski	KO	3 (3)	Nov 15, 1895	28 years, 121 days	Sam T. Jack's Opera House, Chicago, Illinois, US	
12	Win	9–2–1	Rufus Thompson	PTS	8	Mar 20, 1895	27 years, 246 days	Tattersall's, Chicago, Illinois, US	
11	Win	8–2–1	Bob Harper	KO	3 (?)	Oct 29, 1894	27 years, 104 days	McGurn's Handball Court, Chicago, Illinois, US	
10	Win	7–2–1	Ed Pitts	TKO	2 (5)	Sep 22, 1894	27 years, 67 days	Chicago, Illinois, US	Police intervened
9	Loss	6–2–1	Dan Creedon	PTS	3 (6)	Jun 5, 1894	26 years, 323 days	Madison Street Theatre, Chicago, Illinois, US	
8	Draw	6–1–1	Hank Griffin	PTS	20	Apr 1, 1893	25 years, 258 days	Los Angeles, California, US	
7	Win	6–1	'Australian' Billy Smith	KO	12 (?)	Feb 15, 1893	25 years, 213 days	San Francisco, California, US	
6	Win	5–1	James J. Walker	KO	3 (?)	Jan 12, 1893	25 years, 179 days	Palo Alto A.C., San Francisco, California, US	
5	Loss	4–1	John Rivers	DQ	2 (?)	Nov 29, 1892	25 years, 135 days	Pastime A.C., Los Angeles, California, US	Childs had his man out cold but was robbed by an incompetent referee who ignored the entrance into the ring of Rivers' second, then took that man's word as evidence of a foul blow
4	Win	4–0	John Rivers	TKO	4 (4)	Nov 16, 1892	25 years, 122 days	Pastime A.C., Los Angeles, California, US	
3	Win	3–0	Al Butler	KO	1 (4), 0:24	Aug 30, 1892	25 years, 44 days	Pastime A.C., Los Angeles, California, US	
2	Win	2–0	George LaBlanche	DQ	8 (?)	Mar 24, 1892	24 years, 251 days	Pastime A.C., Los Angeles, California, US	LaBlanche DQ'd for grabbing Childs by the waist, throwing him down, and then kicking him
1	Win	1–0	George LaBlanche	KO	3 (?)	Feb 18, 1892	24 years, 216 days	Pastime A.C., Los Angeles, California, US	

Awards and achievements
Preceded by Bob Armstrong	World Colored Heavyweight Champion; January 29 - September 14, 1898	Succeeded by George Byers
Preceded by George Byers	World Colored Heavyweight Champion; March 16, 1901 - February 24, 1902	Succeeded by Ed Martin
Titles in pretence
Preceded by Klondike	Black Heavyweight Champion; August 11, 1899 - October 21, 1902	Title defunct
