= World Colored Heavyweight Championship =

Boxing title

The World Colored Heavyweight Championship was a title awarded to black boxers in the late nineteenth and early twentieth centuries. This was the only recognized heavyweight championship available to black boxers prior to Jack Johnson winning the world heavyweight title in 1908. The title continued to exist until the reign of Joe Louis as universally recognized champ, as the color bar against black heavyweights was enforced during and for a generation after Jack Johnson's reign as world champ.

== Drawing the color line ==
Though not sanctioned by any governing body, the colored heavyweight title was publicly recognized due to the color bar in pro boxing in the 19th and early 20th centuries, when white champions drew the color line and would not defend the title against a black man. In the heavyweight division, the color bar was adamantly defended by "The Boston Strong Boy", bare-knuckle boxing champ John L. Sullivan, the first modern heavyweight champ, who had fought black fighters on his way up to the title but would not defend it against a black man.

Succeeding white heavyweight champs James Corbett and James J. Jeffries followed the same pattern. Since the white champs had fought black fighters as equals on their way up, the color bar undeniably was maintained due to racial prejudice. Since black boxers were being denied a shot at the world title solely due to their race, the general public gave credence to the colored heavyweight title.

== Maintaining the color bar ==
The color bar remained in force even after African-American heavyweight title holder Jack Johnson won the world's heavyweight title in 1908, thus ensuring the colored title remained the ultimate prize for all other black boxers.

Once he was the world's heavyweight champ, Johnson (who relinquished the colored title) never fought black opponents, either. He denied matches to black heavyweights Joe Jeanette (his successor as colored heavyweight champ) and Sam Langford (who beat Jeanette for the colored title) and the young Harry Wills (who was colored heavyweight champ during the last year of Johnson's reign as world's heavyweight champ). Blacks were not given a shot at the title allegedly because such top boxing promoters as Tex Rickard believed that a fight between two black boxers would not draw at the gate.

=== Johnson, Jeanette & Langford ===
Jack Johnson fought Joe Jeanette a total of seven times, all during his reign as colored champ before he became the world's heavyweight champion, winning four times and drawing twice (three of the victories and one draw were newspaper decisions). In their first match on 1905, they had fought to a draw, but in their second match on 25 November 1905, Johnson lost as he was disqualified in the second round of a scheduled six-round fight. Johnson continued to claim the title because of the disqualification.

After Johnson became the first African-American Heavyweight Champion of the World on December 26, 1908, his World Colored Heavyweight Championship was vacated. Jeanette fought Sam McVey for the title in Paris on February 20, 1909, and was beaten, but later took the title from McVey in a 49-round bout on April 17 of that year in Paris for a purse of $6,000 (equivalent to $215,000 in 2025). Sam Langford subsequently claimed the title during Jeanette's reign after Johnson refused to defend the World Heavyweight Championship against him. Eighteen months later, Jeanrette lost the title to Langford.

Johnson never again fought Jeanette despite numerous challenges and avoided Langford, whom he had fought once while he was the colored champ and beaten him very severely on points in a 15-rounder. In August 1914, as Johnson neared the end of his troubled reign, there were reports that Johnson had agreed to fight Langford for the world heavyweight title in Paris, but nothing came of it.

After losing his world heavyweight championship, Johnson never again fought for the colored heavyweight crown.

Because great boxers of the era were barred from fighting for the heavyweight championship because of racism, Johnson’s refusal to fight African-Americans offended the African-American community, since the opportunity to fight top white boxers was rare. Jeanette criticized Johnson, saying, "Jack forgot about his old friends after he became champion and drew the color line against his own people."

== Black Heavyweight Championship ==
The Black Heavyweight Championship was a title in pretense claimed by Klondike Haynes and later by Frank Childs, a two-time holder of the World Colored Heavyweight title.

== Proposed World Boxing Council title ==
The World Boxing Council attempted to create a similar championship in 2004 called the All African World Championship, which would be open to boxers of African descent from any country as well as boxers of any race living in Africa. This proposal was met with worldwide criticism, and the World Boxing Council ultimately abandoned the idea.

== List of champions ==
Eighteen men were recognized as World Colored Heavyweight Champion, combining for 28 total reigns.

#	Name	Reign	Date	Days held	Location	Defenses	Notes
1	Charles C. Smith	1	1876	Unknown	—	0	Smith claimed the title and offered to take on all challengers.
2	Morris Grant	1	1878	Unknown	New York City, New York, USA	1	Lost title to Charles Hadley on points in four-round bout
3	Charles Hadley	1	January 14, 1881	770	New York City, New York, USA	3	Fought Grant Morris 10 times while champ, compiling record of 8 wins, 1 loss, and 1 no decision
4	George Godfrey (b. 1853)	1	February 23, 1883	2009	Boston, Massachusetts, USA	2	
5	Peter Jackson	1	August 24, 1888	3041	San Francisco, California, USA	0	The title was vacated in 1896.
6	Bob Armstrong	1	December 21, 1896	404	New York City, New York, USA	1	Defeated Charley Strong.
7	Frank Childs	1	January 29, 1898	228	Chicago, Illinois, USA	2	
8	George Byers	1	September 14, 1898	913	Chicago, Illinois, USA	4	Frank Childs defeated Bob Armstrong on March 4, 1899 in Cincinnati, Ohio in a fight announced as being for the title, despite Childs' loss to Byers six months earlier.
9	Frank Childs	2	March 16, 1901	345	Hot Springs, Arkansas, USA	0	
10	Ed Martin	1	February 24, 1902	346	Chicago, Illinois, USA	2	Childs continued to claim the title until losing to Jack Johnson on October 21, 1902.
11	Jack Johnson	1	February 5, 1903	2151	Los Angeles, California, USA	12	The title was vacated after Johnson won the World Heavyweight Championship on December 26, 1908.
12	Sam McVea	1	February 20, 1909	56	Paris, France	1	Defeated Joe Jeanette.
13	Joe Jeanette	1	April 17, 1909	507	Paris, France	1	Jeanette beats McVey in a 49-round bout lasting 3½" hours, for a purse of $6,000. Subsequently, Sam Langford claimed the title during Jeanette's reign after Jack Johnson refused to defend the World Heavyweight Championship against him.
14	Sam Langford	1	September 6, 1910	476	Boston, Massachusetts, USA	3	Sam Langford defends his claim to the title, beating Jeanette on points in a 15-round bout.
15	Sam McVea	2	December 26, 1911	104	Sydney, Australia	0	
16	Sam Langford	2	April 8, 1912	753	Sydney, Australia	2	
17	Harry Wills	1	May 1, 1914	209	New Orleans, Louisiana, USA	1	
18	Sam Langford	3	November 26, 1914	403	Los Angeles, California, USA	0	
19	Harry Wills	2	January 3, 1916	39	New Orleans, Louisiana, USA	0	
20	Sam Langford	4	February 11, 1916	349	New Orleans, Louisiana, USA	0	
21	Bill Tate	1	January 25, 1917	97	Kansas City, Missouri, USA	0	
22	Sam Langford	5	May 2, 1917	347	St. Louis, Missouri, USA	1	
23	Harry Wills	3	April 14, 1918	3103	Panama City, Panama	25	The title was vacated after Wills lost by disqualification to Jack Sharkey on October 12, 1926.
24	George Godfrey (b. 1897)	1	November 8, 1926	628	Buffalo, New York, USA	3	Defeated Larry Gaines.
25	Larry Gains	1	August 15, 1928	Unknown	Buffalo, New York, USA	0	The title was later vacated.
26	George Godfrey (b. 1897)	2	August 24, 1931	777	Toronto, Ontario, Canada	3	Defeated Seal Harris.
27	Obie Walker	1	October 9, 1933	649	Philadelphia, Pennsylvania, USA	0	
28	Larry Gains	2	July 20, 1935	Unknown	Leicester, England	0	Title became extinct after Joe Louis won the World Heavyweight title on June 22, 1937.

== See also ==
- World Colored Light Heavyweight Championship
- World Colored Middleweight Championship
- World Colored Welterweight Championship
- Black Heavyweight Championship
- World White Heavyweight Championship
