= Hank Griffin (boxer) =

American boxer

Hank Griffin (ca. 1870 – 2 May 1911) was an African American boxer who fought some of the greatest fighters in history, including World Colored Middleweight Champion Harris "The Black Pearl" Martin, World Colored Heavyweight Champion Frank Childs and World Heavyweight Champions Jack Johnson and James J. Jeffries.

In 1896, in a very early match in James J. Jeffries career, Griffin was lost via a KO. In 1901, Griffin fought Jeffries again which resulted in a no-decision. In 1902, Griffin fought Jack Johnson twice in Los Angeles, California. Griffin won 1 and had 2 draws against Johnson. In Jack Johnson's 1927 autobiography, Johnson stated that:

"In summing up my fights, throughout my career, there were none, even in the championship bouts, which were harder than those with Griffen (sic), and I believe that the greatest punishment I ever received in the ring was at the hands of Griffen."
