= Bob Armstrong (boxer) =

American heavyweight boxer

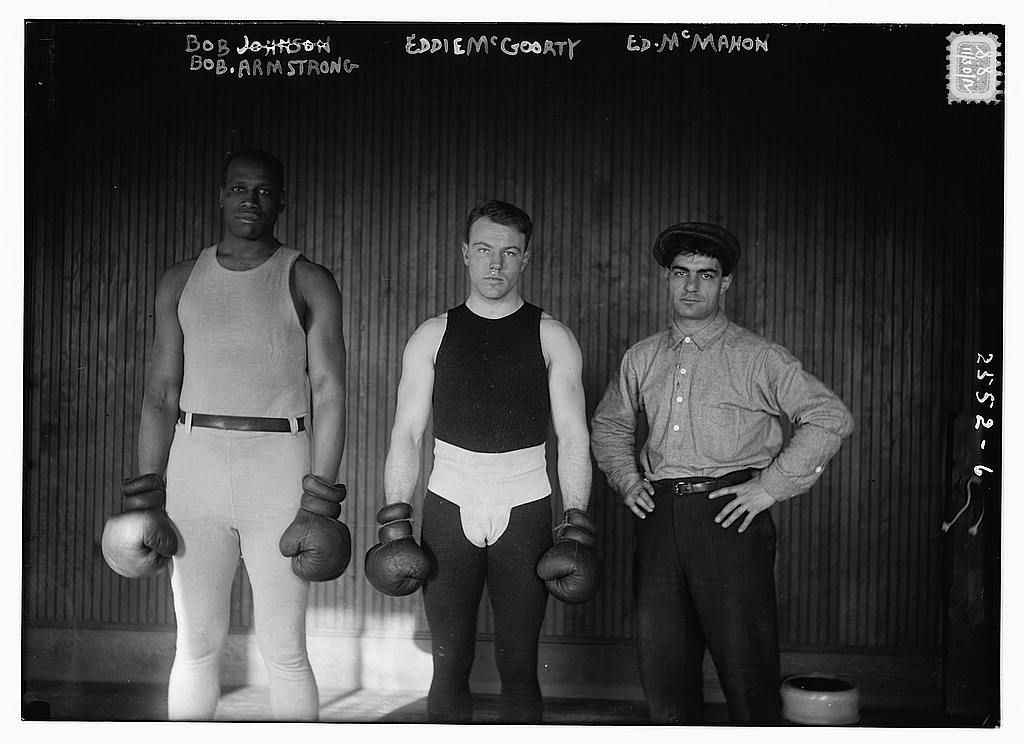
- Armstrong, Eddie McGoorty, and Ed McMahon in 1914

Personal information
- Nickname: The King of the Battle Royal
- Born: September 4, 1873 Rogersville, Tennessee, U.S.
- Died: January 5, 1933 (aged 59) Chicago, Illinois, U.S.
- Height: 6 ft 3 in (1.91 m)
- Weight: Heavyweight

Boxing career
- Stance: Orthodox

Boxing record
- Total fights: 37
- Wins: 18
- Win by KO: 15
- Losses: 11
- Draws: 7
- No contests: 1

Bob Armstrong (September 4, 1873 – January 5, 1933), was a heavyweight boxer known as the "King of the Battle Royal". He was born in Rogersville, Tennessee, but he moved with his family to Washington, Ohio when he was three years old.

Before he got into boxing, Armstrong worked with racing horses in Minneapolis, Minnesota. He made his debut on September 19 in a six-rounder against Joe Choynski in Chicago, Illinois. He lost the decision on points.

Choynski used him as a sparring partner, as did world heavyweight champion pretender Tom Sharkey and the true heavyweight champs Bob Fitzsimmons and Jim Jeffries.

== World Colored Heavyweight Champ ==
On December 21, 1896, he won the World Colored Heavyweight Championship vacated by long-time colored champ Peter Jackson by knocking out Charley Strong in the 19th round in a fight held in New York City (although some sources claim the bout took place in Philadelphia on March 25, 1897). On New Year's Day 1897 he fought Joe Butler in Philadelphia and was knocked out in the second round. They met again on the sixth of March in a title bout, and Armstrong prevailed, winning by a technical knock-out in the 6th round. The following day, he fought Frank Childs and lost to him on points in a non-title bout.

His next fight was a title bout with Sam Pruitt in San Francisco on April 23, 1897, which he won via a 1st round knock-out. His next official fights resulted in a loss on points to Joe Sheehy in a four-rounder in June and a win against Jack Douglass via a TKO in the 2nd round on September 13. Some sources also report that he beat Jack McCormick on September 25. In 1897, he also fought two exhibitions against Tom Sharkey in May and fought two exhibitions against two different opponents, Jimmy Barry and Childs, on May 29. He fought an exhibition against Joe Choynski in August and finished out the year with an exhibition against John Holtman in November.

In the new year of 1898, Armstrong put his championship on the line in a rematch with Childs. On January 29, 1898, and Childs took the title by knocking Armstrong out in the second round.

== Post-Championship ==
On August 5, 1898, Armstrong fought top white heavyweight contender James J. Jeffries, who was less than a year away from winning the world's heavyweight championship, in a 10-round bout at the Lenox Athletic Club in New York City. Armstrong lost on points.

He fought colored heavyweight champ Denver Ed Martin for the colored heavyweight title in the Crystal Palace in London on July 25, 1902. According to the Associated Press coverage of the fight:

"Martin proved the cleverer and never gave his opponent a chance, being declared an easy winner on points at the close of the fifteenth round; Martin, it is announced, will challenge the winner of the Jeffries-Fitzsimmons fight in San Francsico."

Martin was not given a title shot and met Armstrong for a rematch in Philadelphia on December 10 According to the Daily Gazette and Bulletin:

"The bout was fast from the start and both men narrowly escaped a knockout. The bell saved Armstrong in the third and fifth and Martin was floored six times in the fourth round."

The six-round bout ended in a no decision. In his next fight, Martin lost his title to Jack Johnson, who would one day break the color bar and become the first African American heavyweight champion of the world.

Armstrong retired after being KO-ed by Walter Johnson in Haverhill, Massachusetts on December 26, 1904. He ended his career with an official record of 17 wins (with 15 KOs) against 11 losses (in which he was KO-ed six times) and five draws. He also had a newspaper decision record of one win and one draw.

On January 29, 1932, he worked the corner for King Levinsky in his fight against Max Baer.

He died on January 5, 1933, in Chicago, Illinois.

== Legacy & Honors ==
In 2020 award-winning author Mark Allen Baker published the first comprehensive account of The World Colored Heavyweight Championship, 1876-1937, with McFarland & Company, a leading independent publisher of academic & nonfiction books. This history traces the advent and demise of the Championship, the stories of the talented professional athletes who won it, and the demarcation of the color line both in and out of the ring.

For decades the World Colored Heavyweight Championship was a useful tool to combat racial oppression-the existence of the title a leverage mechanism, or tool, used as a technique to counter a social element, “drawing the color line.”

== Professional boxing record ==
All information in this section is derived from BoxRec, unless otherwise stated.

=== Official record ===
37 fights	17 wins	10 losses
By knockout	15	5
By decision	2	5
Draws	5	
No contests	1	
Newspaper decisions/draws	4	

All newspaper decisions are officially regarded as “no decision” bouts and are not counted in the win/loss/draw column.

No.	Result	Record	Opponent	Type	Round, time	Date	Location	Notes
37	Loss	17–10–5 (5)	Walter Johnson	KO	4 (12)	Dec 26, 1904	Haverhill A.C., Haverhill, Massachusetts, U.S.	
36	Win	17–9–5 (5)	Walter Johnson	KO	2 (12)	Apr 18, 1904	Haverhill A.C., Haverhill, Massachusetts, U.S.	
35	Win	16–9–5 (5)	Black Fitzsimmons	KO	1 (25)	Sep 23, 1903	Saunderstown, Rhode Island, U.S.	
34	Loss	15–9–5 (5)	Sandy Ferguson	KO	1 (10)	Aug 20, 1903	Tammany A.C., Boston, Massachusetts, U.S.	
33	Win	15–8–5 (5)	Denver Ed Martin	KO	3 (12)	Jun 10, 1903	Tammany A.C., Boston, Massachusetts, U.S.	
32	NC	14–8–5 (5)	George Gardner	NC	4 (6)	Feb 9, 1903	Washington S.C., Philadelphia, Pennsylvania, U.S.	After the fighters had been "fiddling around for four rounds", the referee stopped the fight
31	Loss	14–8–5 (4)	Denver Ed Martin	NWS	6	Dec 10, 1902	Penn Art Club, Philadelphia, Pennsylvania, U.S.	World colored heavyweight title at stake; (via KO only)
30	Loss	14–8–5 (3)	Denver Ed Martin	PTS	15	Jul 25, 1902	Crystal Palace, Sydenham, London, England, U.K.	For world colored heavyweight title
29	Draw	14–7–5 (3)	Denver Ed Martin	NWS	6	Mar 23, 1900	Industrial Hall, Philadelphia, Pennsylvania, U.S.	
28	Win	14–7–5 (2)	Jim Jeffords	KO	3 (25)	Nov 27, 1899	Hercules A.C., Brooklyn, New York City, New York, U.S.	
27	Loss	13–7–5 (2)	Ed Dunkhorst	PTS	10	Nov 14, 1899	Syracuse, New York, U.S.	
26	Win	13–6–5 (2)	Tom 'Stockings' Conroy	PTS	20	Jul 21, 1899	Broadway A.C., Brooklyn, New York City, New York, U.S.	
25	Win	12–6–5 (2)	Denver Ed Martin	KO	2 (20)	Jun 6, 1899	Lenox A.C., Manhattan, New York City, New York, U.S.	
24	Loss	11–6–5 (2)	Frank Childs	TKO	6 (10)	Mar 4, 1899	Stag A.C., Cincinnati, Ohio, U.S.	For vacant world colored heavyweight title claim
23	Win	11–5–5 (2)	Mexican Pete Everett	TKO	14 (15)	Dec 9, 1898	Wheel Club, Denver, Colorado, U.S.	
22	Draw	10–5–5 (2)	Ed Dunkhorst	PTS	10	Dec 4, 1898	Syracuse, New York, U.S.	
21	Draw	10–5–4 (2)	Joe Goddard	NWS	6	Aug 29, 1898	Arena A.C., Philadelphia, Pennsylvania, U.S.	
20	Loss	10–5–4 (1)	James J. Jeffries	PTS	10	Aug 5, 1898	Lenox A.C., Manhattan, New York City, New York, U.S.	
19	Loss	10–4–4 (1)	Mexican Pete Everett	KO	5 (20)	Jul 4, 1898	Cripple Creek, Colorado, U.S.	
18	Win	10–3–4 (1)	Tom 'Stockings' Conroy	PTS	6	Jun 10, 1898	Arena A.C., Philadelphia, Pennsylvania, U.S.	
17	Win	9–3–4 (1)	Joe Butler	KO	2 (6)	May 27, 1898	Winter Circus, Philadelphia, Pennsylvania, U.S.	
16	Draw	8–3–4 (1)	Ed Dunkhorst	PTS	10	Apr 25, 1898	Central City A.C., Syracuse, New York, U.S.	
15	Win	8–3–3 (1)	Charley Strong	NWS	6	Mar 25, 1898	Arena A.C., Philadelphia, Pennsylvania, U.S.	
14	Win	8–3–3	Yank Kenny	KO	5 (6)	Feb 21, 1898	American A.C., Chicago, Illinois, U.S.	
13	Loss	7–3–3	Frank Childs	KO	2 (6)	Jan 29, 1898	Chicago A.A., Chicago, Illinois, U.S.	Lost world colored heavyweight title
12	Win	7–2–3	Jack Douglass	RTD	2 (8)	Sep 13, 1897	Second Regiment Armory, Chicago, Illinois, U.S.	
11	Loss	6–2–3	Joe Sheehy	PTS	4	Jun 1, 1897	Green Bay, Wisconsin, U.S.	
10	Win	6–1–3	Sam Pruitt	RTD	1 (10)	Apr 23, 1897	Woodward's Pavilion, San Francisco, California, U.S.	Retained world colored heavyweight title
9	Loss	5–1–3	Frank Childs	PTS	6	Mar 7, 1897	Philadelphia, Pennsylvania, U.S.	
8	Win	5–0–3	Joe Butler	TKO	6 (15)	Mar 6, 1897	Broadway A.C., Brooklyn, New York City, New York, U.S.	Retained world colored heavyweight title
7	Win	4–0–3	Charley Strong	KO	19 (20)	Dec 21, 1896	Broadway A.C., Manhattan, New York City, New York, U.S.	Won vacant world colored heavyweight title
6	Win	3–0–3	Frank 'Paddy' Slavin	TKO	4 (20)	Nov 23, 1896	Union Park A.C., Manhattan, New York City, New York, U.S.	
5	Win	2–0–3	Tommy Forrest	TKO	2 (?)	Aug 31, 1896	Madison Square Garden, Manhattan, New York City, New York, U.S.	
4	Draw	1–0–3	Fred Morris	PTS	4	Aug 31, 1896	Madison Square Garden, Manhattan, New York City, New York, U.S.	
3	Win	1–0–2	Frank 'Paddy' Slavin	KO	10 (?)	Nov 5, 1895	Hoboken, New Jersey, U.S.	
2	Draw	0–0–2	Walter Johnson	PTS	10	Jul 15, 1895	Union Park Hall, Boston, Massachusetts, U.S.	
1	Draw	0–0–1	Joe Choynski	PTS	6	Sep 19, 1894	Chicago, Illinois, U.S.	

=== Unofficial record ===
37 fights	18 wins	11 losses
By knockout	15	5
By decision	3	6
Draws	7	
No contests	1	

Record with the inclusion of newspaper decisions in the win/loss/draw column.

No.	Result	Record	Opponent	Type	Round, time	Date	Location	Notes
37	Loss	18–11–7 (1)	Walter Johnson	KO	4 (12)	Dec 26, 1904	Haverhill A.C., Haverhill, Massachusetts, U.S.	
36	Win	18–10–7 (1)	Walter Johnson	KO	2 (12)	Apr 18, 1904	Haverhill A.C., Haverhill, Massachusetts, U.S.	
35	Win	17–10–7 (1)	Black Fitzsimmons	KO	1 (25)	Sep 23, 1903	Saunderstown, Rhode Island, U.S.	
34	Loss	16–10–7 (1)	Sandy Ferguson	KO	1 (10)	Aug 20, 1903	Tammany A.C., Boston, Massachusetts, U.S.	
33	Win	16–9–7 (1)	Denver Ed Martin	KO	3 (12)	Jun 10, 1903	Tammany A.C., Boston, Massachusetts, U.S.	
32	NC	15–9–7 (1)	George Gardner	NC	4 (6)	Feb 9, 1903	Washington S.C., Philadelphia, Pennsylvania, U.S.	After the fighters had been "fiddling around for four rounds", the referee stopped the fight
31	Loss	15–9–7	Denver Ed Martin	NWS	6	Dec 10, 1902	Penn Art Club, Philadelphia, Pennsylvania, U.S.	World colored heavyweight title at stake; (via KO only)
30	Loss	15–8–7	Denver Ed Martin	PTS	15	Jul 25, 1902	Crystal Palace, Sydenham, London, England, U.K.	For world colored heavyweight title
29	Draw	15–7–7	Denver Ed Martin	NWS	6	Mar 23, 1900	Industrial Hall, Philadelphia, Pennsylvania, U.S.	
28	Win	15–7–6	Jim Jeffords	KO	3 (25)	Nov 27, 1899	Hercules A.C., Brooklyn, New York City, New York, U.S.	
27	Loss	14–7–6	Ed Dunkhorst	PTS	10	Nov 14, 1899	Syracuse, New York, U.S.	
26	Win	14–6–6	Tom 'Stockings' Conroy	PTS	20	Jul 21, 1899	Broadway A.C., Brooklyn, New York City, New York, U.S.	
25	Win	13–6–6	Denver Ed Martin	KO	2 (20)	Jun 6, 1899	Lenox A.C., Manhattan, New York City, New York, U.S.	
24	Loss	12–6–6	Frank Childs	TKO	6 (10)	Mar 4, 1899	Stag A.C., Cincinnati, Ohio, U.S.	For vacant world colored heavyweight title claim
23	Win	12–5–6	Mexican Pete Everett	TKO	14 (15)	Dec 9, 1898	Wheel Club, Denver, Colorado, U.S.	
22	Draw	11–5–6	Ed Dunkhorst	PTS	10	Dec 4, 1898	Syracuse, New York, U.S.	
21	Draw	11–5–5	Joe Goddard	NWS	6	Aug 29, 1898	Arena A.C., Philadelphia, Pennsylvania, U.S.	
20	Loss	11–5–4	James J. Jeffries	PTS	10	Aug 5, 1898	Lenox A.C., Manhattan, New York City, New York, U.S.	
19	Loss	11–4–4	Mexican Pete Everett	KO	5 (20)	Jul 4, 1898	Cripple Creek, Colorado, U.S.	
18	Win	11–3–4	Tom 'Stockings' Conroy	PTS	6	Jun 10, 1898	Arena A.C., Philadelphia, Pennsylvania, U.S.	
17	Win	10–3–4	Joe Butler	KO	2 (6)	May 27, 1898	Winter Circus, Philadelphia, Pennsylvania, U.S.	
16	Draw	9–3–4	Ed Dunkhorst	PTS	10	Apr 25, 1898	Central City A.C., Syracuse, New York, U.S.	
15	Win	9–3–3	Charley Strong	NWS	6	Mar 25, 1898	Arena A.C., Philadelphia, Pennsylvania, U.S.	
14	Win	8–3–3	Yank Kenny	KO	5 (6)	Feb 21, 1898	American A.C., Chicago, Illinois, U.S.	
13	Loss	7–3–3	Frank Childs	KO	2 (6)	Jan 29, 1898	Chicago A.A., Chicago, Illinois, U.S.	Lost world colored heavyweight title
12	Win	7–2–3	Jack Douglass	RTD	2 (8)	Sep 13, 1897	Second Regiment Armory, Chicago, Illinois, U.S.	
11	Loss	6–2–3	Joe Sheehy	PTS	4	Jun 1, 1897	Green Bay, Wisconsin, U.S.	
10	Win	6–1–3	Sam Pruitt	RTD	1 (10)	Apr 23, 1897	Woodward's Pavilion, San Francisco, California, U.S.	Retained world colored heavyweight title
9	Loss	5–1–3	Frank Childs	PTS	6	Mar 7, 1897	Philadelphia, Pennsylvania, U.S.	
8	Win	5–0–3	Joe Butler	TKO	6 (15)	Mar 6, 1897	Broadway A.C., Brooklyn, New York City, New York, U.S.	Retained world colored heavyweight title
7	Win	4–0–3	Charley Strong	KO	19 (20)	Dec 21, 1896	Broadway A.C., Manhattan, New York City, New York, U.S.	Won vacant world colored heavyweight title
6	Win	3–0–3	Frank 'Paddy' Slavin	TKO	4 (20)	Nov 23, 1896	Union Park A.C., Manhattan, New York City, New York, U.S.	
5	Win	2–0–3	Tommy Forrest	TKO	2 (?)	Aug 31, 1896	Madison Square Garden, Manhattan, New York City, New York, U.S.	
4	Draw	1–0–3	Fred Morris	PTS	4	Aug 31, 1896	Madison Square Garden, Manhattan, New York City, New York, U.S.	
3	Win	1–0–2	Frank 'Paddy' Slavin	KO	10 (?)	Nov 5, 1895	Hoboken, New Jersey, U.S.	
2	Draw	0–0–2	Walter Johnson	PTS	10	Jul 15, 1895	Union Park Hall, Boston, Massachusetts, U.S.	
1	Draw	0–0–1	Joe Choynski	PTS	6	Sep 19, 1894	Chicago, Illinois, U.S.	

Awards and achievements
Preceded by Peter Jackson (Vacated title)	World Colored Champion; December 21, 1896 – January 29, 1898	Succeeded by Frank Childs
