= Sandy Ferguson =

Canadian boxer (1879–1919)

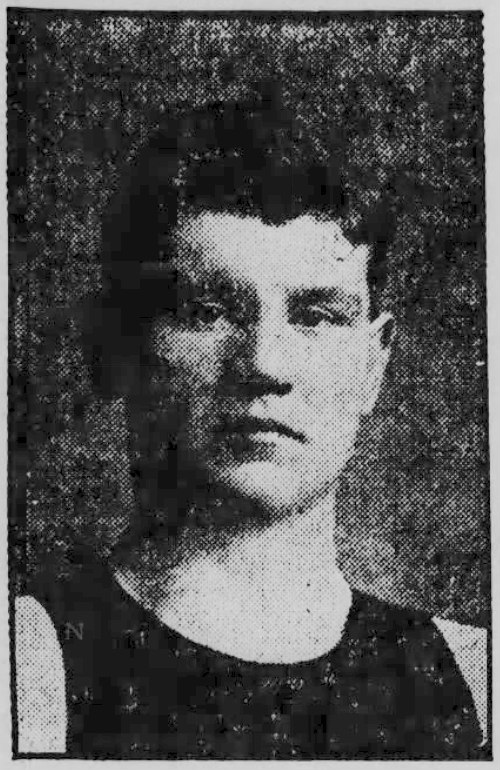

Personal information
- Nickname: Big Sandy
- Born: John H. Ferguson; July 24, 1879 Moncton, New Brunswick, Canada
- Died: February 26, 1919 (aged 39) Providence, Rhode Island, U.S.
- Height: 6 ft 3 in (1.91 m)
- Weight: Heavyweight

Boxing career
- Stance: Orthodox

Boxing record
- Total fights: 75
- Wins: 38
- Win by KO: 11
- Losses: 25
- Draws: 12

Sandy Ferguson (July 24, 1879 – February 26, 1919) was a Canadian professional boxer. Born in New Brunswick, Ferguson moved to Chelsea, Massachusetts, US, with his family at age 13. He began his professional career there in 1898. Ferguson won his first three fights with ease, defeating Sid West on points twice and Paul Watson via first-round knockout. Ferguson remained undefeated up until June 1900, racking up a record of 10-0-6. None of Ferguson's first 16 fights, however, were against a top contender. On December 17, 1900, Ferguson suffered his first major setback when he was outpointed in a bout with veteran Dick O'Brien. Two months later he was disqualified in the same round against the same Dick O'Brien. After a lightning knockout of John MacDonald at Gloucester, Massachusetts in April, Ferguson left the USA and headed to England, where he strung together a record of 6-1-2 before returning to America in January 1903. Ferguson's first fight after returning from Britain was against the brilliant boxer George Byers. The match ended in a prearranged draw, as Ferguson was dropped four times by Byers. After this match, however, Ferguson gained popularity by avenging his previous losses to fellow ex-pat Canadian Dick O'Brien by scoring a sixth-round knockout on March 25, 1903. This was followed by a twelve-round decision over George Byers.

== Ferguson vs. Johnson ==
These two significant victories earned Ferguson a date with the legendary Jack Johnson on April 16, 1903. Johnson came into the fight riding a 14 fight unbeaten streak. Johnson was also the World 'Colored' Heavyweight Champion at the time. Although Ferguson went the distance, he lost a decision to Johnson. The two would meet in a rematch three months later that was ruled a No Contest. Later that year, on December 11, Ferguson and Johnson fought once again, this time in a grueling twenty-round war, that Johnson won by decision. In 1904, Ferguson and Johnson met yet again, but the match was declared a No Contest. Ferguson was given one last chance against the "Galveston Giant" in 1905. Johnson emerged as the victor in this final match after Ferguson was disqualified in the seventh round for kneeing Johnson in the groin twice.

== Ferguson vs. Walcott ==
In November 1903 Ferguson took on the World Welterweight Champion Joe Walcott. Ferguson managed to win the bout via decision. In 1904, however, Walcott avenged his loss the previous year by winning a ten-round decision of his own over Ferguson.

== The last ten fights ==
Suffering from frequent battles with the bottle, Ferguson's career ended in disappointment. In his final ten fights his record was a dreadful 1-8-1. His competition during these final bouts, however, was some of the best of his career. These fighters included the future Light Heavyweight Champion of the World, Battling Levinsky and the holder of the World Colored Heavyweight Championship, Sam McVey.
