= Newspaper decision =

Unofficial boxing match result

A newspaper decision was a type of decision in professional boxing. It was rendered by a consensus of sportswriters attending a bout after it had ended inconclusively with a "no decision", as many regions had not adopted the National Sporting Club of London's rules regarding judges and referees. A "no decision" occurred when, either under the sanctioning of state boxing law or by an arrangement between the fighters, both boxers were still standing at the end of a fight and there had been no knockout, no official decision had been made, and neither boxer was declared the winner. The sportswriters covering the fight, after reaching a consensus, would declare a winner – or render the bout a draw – and print the newspaper decision in their publications. Officially, however, a "no decision" bout resulted in neither boxer winning or losing, and would therefore not count as part of their official fight record. This should not be confused with the unrelated and contemporary term, "no contest".

The development of boxing scoring, initially by round scoring by the referee and two judges, to the modern three judges with the ten-point system, has eliminated this practice. Despite that, some media outlets still do "newspaper decisions" using the ten-point system. For example, in the July 19, 2025 Manny Pacquiao vs. Mario Barrios contest for the WBC welterweight championship, judge Max DeLuca scored it Barrios 115-113, and judges Steve Weisfeld and Tim Cheatham scored the contest 114-114, resulting in a draw as two of three judges declared it as such. The Associated Press, in its report, scored a "newspaper decision" of 115-113 Pacquiao based on their writer on-site, who is positioned differently than the judges.
