= George Dawson (boxer) =

Australian boxer

Personal information
- Nationality: Australian
- Born: 7 October 1867 Dark Corner, New South Wales
- Height: 5 ft 7 1/2 in (1.71 m)
- Weight: Lightweight

Boxing career
- Reach: 68 in (173 cm)

George Dawson was a 19th-century Lightweight Bare-knuckle boxing champion, said to have developed the kidney punch.

== Early life ==
Dawson was born on 7 October 1867 in the village of Dark Corner, New South Wales during the Australian gold rush. His parents George and Elizabeth had immigrated from Wrawby, England on the ship Emperor in 1851 to join the Australian gold rushes.

Following the deaths of his parents through his childhood, he had itinerant employment through New South Wales, until a chance meeting with a boxing trainer, who encouraged him to try the sport.

== Australian career ==
His height was 5 ft 7½ in (1.71 m), weight 125-140 lbs and had a reach of 68 in (173 cm) He won the Lightweight championship of Queensland in 1887 and Lightweight Championship of Australia 1889-1891.

== American career ==
He immigrated to the United States in 1892 arriving in San Francisco on the steamer, Alameda.

His professional career included:

- won 11 (KO 11)
- lost 1 (KO 1)
- drawn 3

Total rounds boxed 292 and included bouts with:

- Tommy Ryan
- Bob Fitzsimmons
- Billy Gallagher
- Danny Needham
- Tom Williams

== Later life ==
He took a job as a boxing trainer at the University of Chicago. There he married Adele Abbot, a proof reader at a printing company on 28 June 1905 in Cook County, Illinois, and they had two children, a son John H. (born 1908) and a daughter Elizabeth (born 1909).
