= Wolla Meranda =

Australian writer and artist

Wolla Meranda (born Isabella Gertrude Ada Poyitt; 1863 – 12 May 1951) was an Australian novelist, journalist, editor, and artist.

== Early life ==
Gertrude Poyitt was born in Bathurst, New South Wales, Australia, and had two sisters and a brother. Their mother was Elizabeth Armour and their father was David Poyitt (born 1823), a miner who died, insolvent, in 1864. She spent much of her adult life in the small mining town of Sunny Corner, 40 km from Bathurst, where she worked as a schoolteacher. Her brother Norman had shares in a mine in nearby Dark Corner and also lived in Sunny Corner for much of his life.

== Adult life and writing career ==
She wrote a version of her first published novel, Pavots de la Nuit, when she was 21. She married George Nicol Williams on 30 December 1891 in Hartley, NSW. They had one child, Roy Nicol Williams, who died in infancy. In late 1903 Williams travelled to New Caledonia to take a mining job, and was killed the following April in a work-related accident, at the age of 32. In 1905, she married Malcolm E. Yates, but the marriage lasted only six months. Nonetheless, in her daily life she continued to be known as ‘Mrs. Yates’ until her death almost half a century later. Malcolm Yates died in 1930.

Her writing, under the name of Wolla Meranda, was appearing in the regional press in NSW as early as 1911. She became known for her war poetry during the First World War. She was a frequent correspondent with the notable Australian writer and critic A. G. Stephens and contributed to his publications. She often wrote about the natural environment and Australian flora and fauna, and maintained a column, 'Bush Calendar,' for Stephens' magazine The Bookfellow between 1921 and 1922. Furthermore, she was described in 1930 as ‘a prominent nature lover.’

In 1920, she submitted her novel In Mulga Town for consideration in the Australian literary competition launched by C. J. De Garis. The Bookfellow claimed in 1920 that the book had been ‘picked’ in the competition, but it was not amongst the three prizewinners, and nor was it published by the C. J. De Garis Publishing House.

Pavots de la Nuit was her first published novel, issued in French by the Parisian firm of Editions Sansot in 1922 and prepared in collaboration with Iann Karmor. Reviewing the book favourably, one columnist suggested that while its setting was undeniably Australian, ‘the characters, psychology and atmosphere remain Parisian’. The book appeared in English in 1930 as Poppies of the Night. Wolla Miranda's three subsequent published works were in English: Villa of the Isles in 1930, The Red River of Life in 1931 and Light and Outer Darkness in 1935. All of these works were published by William Brooks of Sydney, although The Red River of Life was also produced in a self-published edition in 1931 and it appears that she financed the publication of all her works published in Australia.

Wolla Meranda also produced a number of manuscripts which remain unpublished. These include The World Tongue, What is Truth, The Summer Seas, The Perfidy of Jane Forster, Gold Dust of Mittewa Creek, In Mulga Town, Big Jack of Mittewa Creek, and Old Paddy O’Mara. The last three mentioned are retained in manuscript form at the Mitchell Library in Sydney.

In 1920, Wolla Meranda successfully petitioned for the release of Julien de Sanary, a convict imprisoned in New Caledonia. She had encountered de Sanary in New Caledonia following the death of her first husband and was inspired by his poetry to campaign for his release and relocation to Australia. Once de Sanary was freed, the two lived together at Sunny Corner until his death in 1929. She edited and annotated his posthumous collection Poesies, published (in French) in 1931.

Wolla Meranda was also a painter, and would include portraits of her characters in each of her books. She also contributed art to sundry other publications, such as A. G. Stephens' Commemorative Ode for the Opening of the Commonwealth Parliament published in 1927. A portrait by her of 'The Bookfellow'—presumably, Stephens himself—was a finalist in the Archibald Prize in 1922.

== Death and legacy ==
Wolla Meranda died at the age of 87 on 12 May 1951. Her tombstone records her pen name rather than any of the names she used amongst her friends or family during her lifetime. In 1989 Christine Karlsen published a biographical booklet, Gert: A Lady Ahead of her Time. Poyitt Street, Franklin, ACT was named in her honour in 2008. On 5 May 2019, Wolla Meranda was added as a ‘Pillar of Bathurst’, commemorating her as a community member who played a role in that city's history.

== Bibliography ==
- Pavots de la nuit : roman de mœurs Australiennes (with Iann Karmor) (1922)
- Poppies of the Night (1930)
- Villa of the Isles (1930)
- Light and Outer Darkness (1935)
- As editor:
  - Poésies de Julien de Sanary (1931)
