= Tommy Ryan =

American boxer (1870-1948)

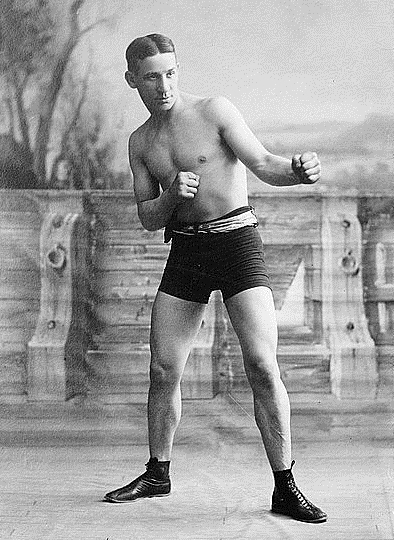

Personal information
- Nationality: American, Canadian
- Born: Joseph Youngs; March 31, 1870 Redwood, New York, U.S.
- Died: August 3, 1948 (aged 78) Phoenix, Arizona, U.S.
- Height: 5 ft 7 1/2 in (171 cm)
- Weight: Middleweight; Welterweight

Boxing career
- Stance: Original

Boxing record
- Total fights: 106; with the inclusion of newspaper decisions
- Wins: 87
- Win by KO: 68
- Losses: 2
- Draws: 14
- No contests: 3

Tommy Ryan (born Joseph Youngs; March 31, 1870 – August 3, 1948) was an American-Canadian World Welterweight and World Middleweight boxing champion who fought from 1887 to 1907. His simultaneously holding records in both weight classes was a rare and impressive feat for a boxer. His record is a topic that has been up for debate for decades. As of May 2021, Boxrec.com lists his official record as 82–2–13 (68KO). The International Boxing Hall of Fame lists his record as 86–3–6 (22KO). Others list his record anywhere from 86–3–6 (68KO), to 90–6–11 (70KO), to 84–2–11 (70KO). Some historians have even speculated that he held closer to 90 knockouts. Ryan was posthumously inducted into the International Boxing Hall of Fame in the class of 1991.

== Boxing career ==
Ryan was considered by many one of the greatest Middleweights in boxing history. He was the World Middleweight Champion from 1898 to 1906. Some of his opponents included Mysterious Billy Smith, Kid McCoy, Tommy West, and Jack Bonner. After his retirement as a fighter he became a boxing teacher and coach. He was credited with helping devise the crouching crab technique for defense. During his career of 97 fights he won 82 (70 by knockout), lost 2, with 13 draws. Ryan was considered an excellent boxer-puncher and nearly unbeatable for his time.

Ryan first won the welterweight title in a match with Mysterious Billy Smith on July 26, 1894. He was knocked out by Kid McCoy in the 15th round on March 2, 1896. This bout forms part of the lore of the McCoy legend. McCoy served as a sparring partner for Ryan, and absorbed many beatings at the hands of his employer. Ryan was notorious for showing little mercy to his sparring partners.

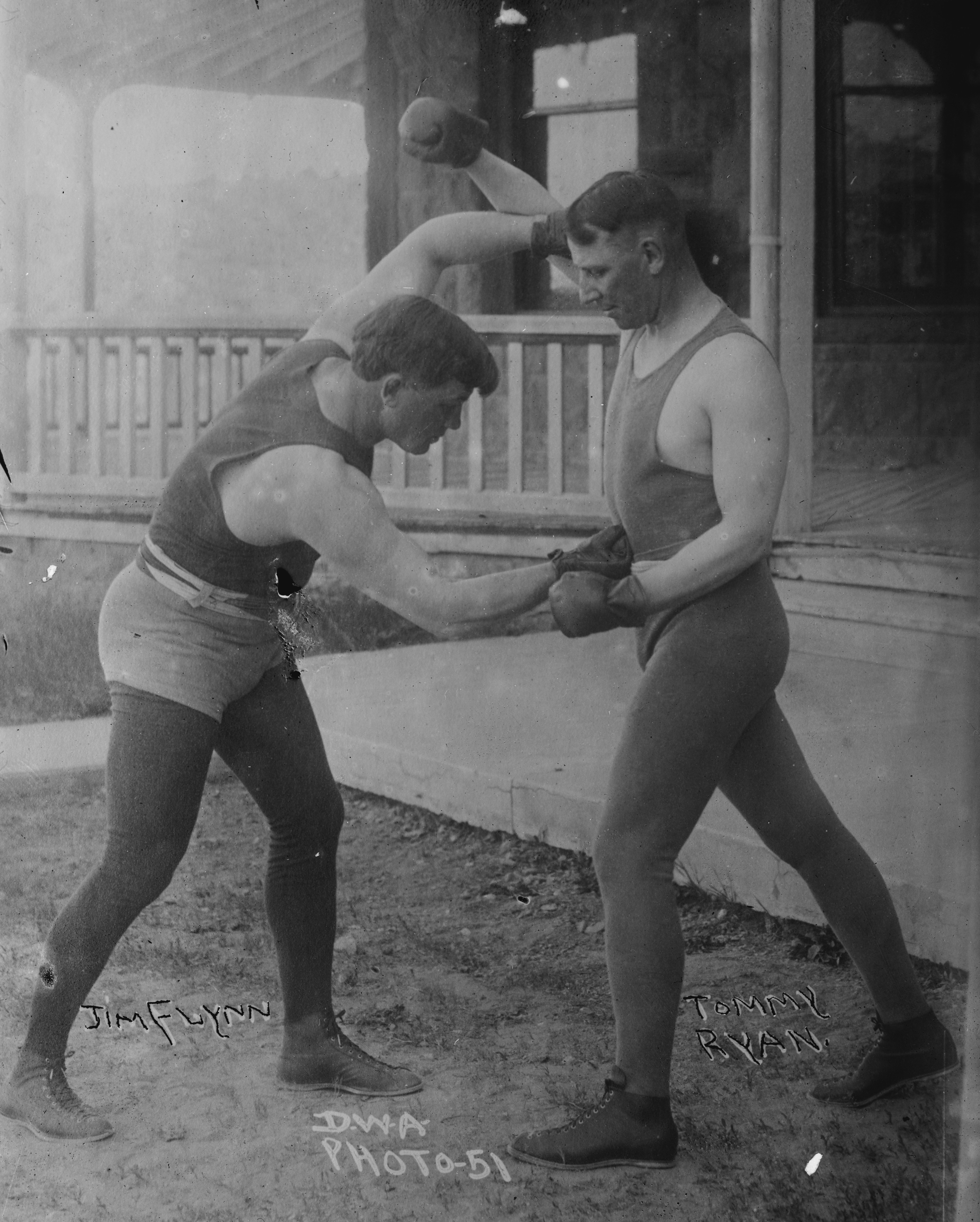
Ryan and Fireman Jim Flynn, between 1910 and 1915

As a result, McCoy hated Ryan, and sought revenge. It is alleged that McCoy, who appeared thin, pale and frail, persuaded Ryan that he was seriously ill before their fight. McCoy, who was famed as a trickster, purportedly rubbed flour on his face so as to appear deathly ill. Ryan is said to have fallen for the ruse, failed to train properly and was not in top condition for the bout. Whether true or not, McCoy scored an upset win over Ryan in the non-title match.

In November 1941, Ryan accepted the position of boxing instructor at the Multnomah Athletic Club. A month later, he resigned the position and told The Oregonian, "I don't think I would have come west had I known that professional boxing was barred in the states of Washington and Oregon. There is too much money in other sections of the country for me to stick here at a $150 job".

Ryan was also instrumental in the career of heavyweight champion James J. Jeffries. In fact, Ryan is credited with changing Jeffries' stance and teaching him to fight out of a crouch. Although, Jeffries disputes this saying he developed his crouching style instinctively after taking a left hook to the liver by John Brink.

Ryan also seconded James J. Corbett in his second attempt to wrest the heavyweight crown from Jeffries. Corbett however, blamed Ryan's strategy for his defeat. In 2003, Ryan was listed in The Ring magazine's list of 100 greatest punchers of all time.

Ryan died on August 3, 1948, aged 78.

== Professional boxing record ==
All information in this section is derived from BoxRec, unless otherwise stated.

=== Official record ===
106 fights	82 wins	2 losses
By knockout	68	1
By decision	13	0
By disqualification	1	1
Draws	13	
No contests	3	
Newspaper decisions/draws	6	

All newspaper decisions are officially regarded as “no decision” bouts and are not counted in the win/loss/draw column.

No.	Result	Record	Opponent	Type	Round	Date	Location	Notes
106	NC	82–2–13 (9)	Ed Martin	NC	6	Nov 29, 1911	Armory, Portland, Oregon, U.S.	Ryan was the promoter. This was an exhibition Martin subbed for Fritz Holland
105	Draw	82–2–13 (8)	Hugo Kelly	PTS	6	Mar 4, 1907	Bartholomay Pavilion, Charlotte, New York, U.S.	
104	Win	82–2–12 (8)	Dave Barry	KO	5 (20)	Feb 5, 1907	Bell Opera House, Benton Harbor, Michigan, U.S.	
103	Win	81–2–12 (8)	Billy Stift	KO	4 (10)	Dec 29, 1904	Bell Opera House, Benton Harbor, Michigan, U.S.	
102	NC	80–2–12 (8)	Jack Root	NC	4 (6)	Nov 23, 1904	National A.C., Philadelphia, Pennsylvania, U.S.	
101	Win	80–2–12 (7)	Jack Graham	TKO	4 (10)	Nov 15, 1904	South Bend, Indiana, U.S.	
100	Win	79–2–12 (7)	Tommy Wallace	KO	5 (10)	Oct 26, 1904	Bell Opera House, Benton Harbor, Michigan, U.S.	
99	Win	78–2–12 (7)	Bob Douglass	KO	4 (8)	Oct 10, 1904	Jai Alai Club, Saint Louis, Missouri, U.S.	
98	Win	77–2–12 (7)	Jack Beauscholte	TKO	6 (10)	Feb 24, 1904	Auditorium, Indianapolis, Indiana, U.S.	
97	Draw	76–2–12 (7)	Philadelphia Jack O'Brien	NWS	6	Jan 27, 1904	National A.C., Philadelphia, Pennsylvania, U.S.	
96	Win	76–2–12 (6)	John Willie	KO	4 (20)	Jun 30, 1903	Broadway Theater, Butte, Montana, U.S.	
95	Draw	75–2–12 (6)	Dan Hickey	PTS	6	Jun 23, 1903	Auditorium, Battle Creek, Michigan, U.S.	
94	Win	75–2–11 (6)	James J Walker	KO	5 (?)	Jun 1, 1903	Battle Creek, Michigan, U.S.	
93	Win	74–2–11 (6)	Cyclone Kelly	TKO	7 (10)	Feb 3, 1903	Whittington Park A.C., Hot Springs, Arkansas, U.S.	
92	Win	73–2–11 (6)	Billy Stift	KO	4 (10)	Jan 15, 1903	Delaware Club, Kansas City, Missouri, U.S.	
91	Win	72–2–11 (6)	Barney Walsh	KO	2 (6)	Oct 3, 1902	Turner Hall, Kansas City, Missouri, U.S.	
90	Win	71–2–11 (6)	Jack Beauscholte	KO	3 (6)	Oct 3, 1902	Turner Hall, Kansas City, Missouri, U.S.	
89	Win	70–2–11 (6)	Kid Carter	KO	6 (20)	Sep 15, 1902	International A.C., Fort Erie, Canada	Retained world middleweight title
88	Win	69–2–11 (6)	Johnny Gorman	KO	3 (15)	Jun 24, 1902	National Sporting Club, Covent Garden, London	Retained world middleweight title
87	Win	68–2–11 (6)	Jimmy Handler	TKO	4 (10)	May 26, 1902	Turner Hall, Kansas City, Missouri, U.S.	
86	Win	67–2–11 (6)	Billy Stift	PTS	10	Apr 3, 1902	Turner Hall, Kansas City, Missouri, U.S.	
85	Win	66–2–11 (6)	Mysterious Billy Smith	KO	4 (10)	Mar 14, 1902	Turner Hall, Kansas City, Missouri, U.S.	
84	Win	65–2–11 (6)	Tim Draffin Murphy	KO	8 (10)	Feb 25, 1902	Strope's Hall, Kansas City, Missouri, U.S.	
83	Win	64–2–11 (6)	Jack Beauscholte	PTS	6	Feb 15, 1902	De Soto Club, Chicago, Illinois, U.S.	
82	Win	63–2–11 (6)	George Green	KO	7 (10)	Jan 30, 1902	3rd Regiment Armory, Kansas City, Missouri, U.S.	Retained world middleweight title
81	Loss	62–2–11 (6)	George Green	DQ	6 (15)	Oct 10, 1901	Jackson County Democratic Club, Kansas City, Missouri, U.S.	Ryan was disqualified for striking Green with his knee
80	Win	62–1–11 (6)	Bob Douglass	TKO	7 (10)	Aug 22, 1901	Kansas City, Missouri, U.S.	
79	Win	61–1–11 (6)	Tommy West	TKO	17 (20)	Mar 4, 1901	Auditorium, Louisville, Kentucky, U.S.	Retained world middleweight title
78	Win	60–1–11 (6)	Jim Judge	KO	4 (6)	Jan 31, 1901	Minneapolis A.C., Minneapolis, Minnesota, U.S.	
77	Win	59–1–11 (6)	Jack Beauscholte	KO	3 (20)	Jan 17, 1901	City Hall, Springfield, Ohio, U.S.	
76	Win	58–1–11 (6)	Kid Carter	PTS	6	Nov 27, 1900	Tattersall's, Chicago, Illinois, U.S.	
75	Win	57–1–11 (6)	Geoff Thorne	KO	3 (6)	Nov 10, 1900	Chicago A.C., Chicago, Illinois, U.S.	
74	Draw	56–1–11 (6)	Jack Root	PTS	6	Jul 24, 1900	Tattersall's, Chicago, Illinois, U.S.	
73	Win	56–1–10 (6)	Young Mahoney	PTS	6	Jun 29, 1900	Fort Dearborn A.C., Chicago, Illinois, U.S.	
72	Draw	55–1–10 (6)	Charles Kid McCoy	PTS	6	May 29, 1900	Tattersall's, Chicago, Illinois, U.S.	
71	Win	55–1–9 (6)	George Lawler	TKO	13 (20)	Feb 2, 1900	Auditorium, Hot Springs, Arkansas, U.S.	
70	Win	54–1–9 (6)	Frank Craig	TKO	10 (20)	Sep 18, 1899	Coney Island A.C., Brooklyn, New York City, New York, U.S.	Retained world middleweight title
69	Win	53–1–9 (6)	Jack Moffat	PTS	20	Aug 31, 1899	Auditorium for fistic carnival, Dubuque, U.S.	Retained world middleweight title
68	Win	52–1–9 (6)	Billy Stift	PTS	20	Apr 19, 1899	Saengerfest Hall, Davenport, Iowa, U.S.	
67	Win	51–1–9 (6)	Frank Neal	KO	6 (20)	Apr 6, 1899	Tuxedo A.C., Dubuque, Iowa, U.S.	
66	Win	50–1–9 (6)	Paddy Purtell	TKO	4 (10)	Mar 13, 1899	Robinson Opera House, Cincinnati, Ohio, U.S.	
65	Win	49–1–9 (6)	Charley Johnson	KO	8 (20)	Mar 1, 1899	Whittington Park, Hot Springs, Arkansas, U.S.	Retained world middleweight title
64	Win	48–1–9 (6)	Dick O'Brien	TKO	14 (25)	Dec 23, 1898	Coliseum, Hartford, Connecticut, U.S.	Retained world middleweight title
63	NC	47–1–9 (6)	Tommy West	NC	6	Dec 2, 1898	Arena A.C., Philadelphia, Pennsylvania, U.S.	
62	Win	47–1–9 (5)	Johnny Gorman	RTD	8 (20)	Nov 23, 1898	Turn Hall, Syracuse, New York, U.S.	Retained world middleweight title
61	Win	46–1–9 (5)	Jack Bonner	NWS	6	Nov 8, 1898	Arena A.C., Philadelphia, Pennsylvania, U.S.	
60	Win	46–1–9 (4)	Jack Bonner	PTS	20	Oct 24, 1898	Greater New York A.C., Brooklyn, New York City, New York, U.S.	Retained world middleweight title
59	Win	45–1–9 (4)	Tommy West	TKO	14 (20)	Jun 13, 1898	Lenox A.C., New York City, New York, U.S.	Retained world middleweight title
58	Win	44–1–9 (4)	George Green	KO	18 (20)	Feb 25, 1898	Woodward's Pavilion, San Francisco, California, U.S.	Retained world middleweight title
57	Win	43–1–9 (4)	Bill Heffernan	KO	3 (20)	Dec 20, 1897	Olympic A.C., Buffalo, New York, U.S.	Won vacant world middleweight title
56	Win	42–1–9 (4)	Billy Stift	TKO	6 (12)	Nov 30, 1897	Battery D Armory, Chicago, Illinois, U.S.	
55	Win	41–1–9 (4)	Australian Jim Ryan	KO	5 (20)	Nov 25, 1897	Maple Avenue A.C., Elmira, New York, U.S.	
54	Draw	40–1–9 (4)	Charles Kid McCoy	PTS	5	Sep 8, 1897	Alhambra, Syracuse, New York, U.S.	
53	Win	40–1–8 (4)	Tom Williams	KO	2 (20)	Jun 21, 1897	Alhambra, Syracuse, New York, U.S.	
52	Win	39–1–8 (4)	Patsy Raedy	TKO	6 (20)	May 24, 1897	Rienzi A.C., Rochester, New York, U.S.	
51	Win	38–1–8 (4)	Paddy Gorman	TKO	3 (?)	May 10, 1897	Rienzi A.C., Rochester, New York, U.S.	
50	Win	37–1–8 (4)	Patsy Raedy	TKO	18 (20)	Mar 17, 1897	Rienzi A.C., Rochester, New York, U.S.	
49	Win	36–1–8 (4)	Tom Tracey	TKO	9 (20)	Feb 24, 1897	Alhambra, Syracuse, New York, U.S.	Retained world welterweight title
48	Win	35–1–8 (4)	Billy Payne	KO	4 (20)	Dec 23, 1896	Alhambra, Syracuse, New York, U.S.	
47	Win	34–1–8 (4)	Billy McCarthy	TKO	7 (20)	Dec 21, 1896	Empire A.C., Buffalo, New York, U.S.	
46	Win	33–1–8 (4)	Mysterious Billy Smith	DQ	9 (20)	Nov 25, 1896	Empire A.C., Maspeth, Queens, New York City, New York, U.S.	
45	Win	32–1–8 (4)	Dick Moore	PTS	20	Aug 20, 1896	Lyceum Theater, Buffalo, New York, U.S.	
44	Win	31–1–8 (4)	Billy (Shadow) Maber	TKO	9 (20)	Jun 22, 1896	Lyceum Theater, Buffalo, New York, U.S.	
43	Win	30–1–8 (4)	Joe Dunfee	KO	6 (20)	May 18, 1896	Empire A.C., Buffalo, New York, U.S.	
42	Loss	29–1–8 (4)	Charles Kid McCoy	KO	15 (20)	Mar 2, 1896	Empire A.C., Maspeth, Queens, New York City, New York, U.S.	For vacant world middleweight title
41	Win	29–0–8 (4)	Henry Baker	PTS	6	Jan 15, 1896	Powers' Opera House, Grand Rapids, Michigan, U.S.	
40	Draw	28–0–8 (4)	Mysterious Billy Smith	PTS	18 (25)	May 27, 1895	Sea Side A.C., Coney Island, New York, U.S.	Retained world welterweight title; Stopped when the police intervened, with Smith hanging helpless on the ropes
39	Win	28–0–7 (4)	Tom Tracey	TKO	8 (8)	Mar 20, 1895	Tattersall's, Chicago, Illinois, U.S.	
38	Win	27–0–7 (4)	Emmett Mellody	PTS	4	Mar 11, 1895	Auditorium, Kansas City, Missouri, U.S.	
37	Win	26–0–7 (4)	Shorty Ahearn	NWS	4	Feb 25, 1895	Triangle AC, Chicago, Illinois, U.S.	
36	Win	26–0–7 (3)	Nonpareil Dempsey	TKO	3 (15)	Jan 18, 1895	Sea Side A.C., Coney Island, New York, U.S.	
35	Win	25–0–7 (3)	Billy Layton	KO	4 (20)	Sep 13, 1894	Saint Joseph, Missouri, U.S.	
34	Win	24–0–7 (3)	Mysterious Billy Smith	PTS	20	Jul 26, 1894	Twin City A.C., Minneapolis, Minnesota, U.S.	Retained world welterweight title; Won world welterweight title claim
33	Win	23–0–7 (3)	Jack Pitts	KO	3 (?)	Jun 1, 1894	Minneapolis, Minnesota, U.S.	
32	Win	22–0–7 (3)	Jack Falvey	KO	3 (8)	May 22, 1894	Foot Guard Hall, Hartford, Connecticut, U.S.	
31	Win	21–0–7 (3)	Harry Wilkes	NWS	5	Apr 22, 1894	Olympic Theatre, Saint Louis, Missouri, U.S.	
30	Win	21–0–7 (2)	Morris Lane	TKO	3 (8)	Apr 10, 1894	Savin Rock, West Haven, Connecticut, U.S.	
29	Draw	20–0–7 (2)	Mysterious Billy Smith	PTS	6	Jan 9, 1894	Casino, Boston, Massachusetts, U.S.	
28	Draw	20–0–6 (2)	Joe Guthrie	PTS	3 (10)	Dec 11, 1893	Opera House, Naugatuck, Connecticut, U.S.	Guthrie was practically knocked out, as he lay on the floor an outsider rang the bell. Referee declared he could have fought on if the bell wasn't rung
27	Win	20–0–5 (2)	Harry Jamieson	KO	2 (?)	Nov 2, 1893	Waterbury, Connecticut, U.S.	
26	Draw	19–0–5 (2)	Mysterious Billy Smith	PTS	6	Aug 29, 1893	Coney Island A.C., Brooklyn, New York City, New York, U.S.	
25	Win	19–0–4 (2)	George Dawson	NWS	6	Apr 8, 1893	2nd Regiment Armory, Chicago, Illinois, U.S.	
24	Draw	19–0–4 (1)	Tommy Kelly	PTS	8	Dec 1, 1892	Detroit, Michigan, U.S.	Exact date unknown
23	Draw	19–0–3 (1)	Jack Collins	PTS	8	Nov 24, 1892	Auditorium, Detroit, Michigan, U.S.	
22	Draw	19–0–2 (1)	Jack Wilkes	PTS	17 (?)	Jul 30, 1892	Germania Hall, South Omaha, Nebraska, U.S.	Retained world welterweight title; The bout was stopped by police in the 17th round and was declared a draw
21	Win	19–0–1 (1)	Paddy Brennan	PTS	10	May 7, 1892	Dubuque, Iowa, U.S.	
20	Win	18–0–1 (1)	Con Doyle	PTS	8	Apr 11, 1892	Grand Opera House, Dubuque, Iowa, U.S.	
19	Win	17–0–1 (1)	Frank Howson	KO	14 (?)	Dec 13, 1891	skating rink, near Chicago, Illinois, U.S.	Retained world welterweight title
18	Win	16–0–1 (1)	Billy McMillan	KO	3 (?)	Aug 8, 1891	Richardson, Illinois, U.S.	Retained world welterweight title
17	Win	15–0–1 (1)	Danny Needham	RTD	76 (?)	Feb 17, 1891	Twin City A.C., Minneapolis, Minnesota, U.S.	Won vacant world welterweight title
16	Win	14–0–1 (1)	Professor McGuire	TKO	3 (5)	Dec 6, 1890	Chicago, Illinois, U.S.	
15	Win	13–0–1 (1)	Frank Garrard	NWS	3	Dec 6, 1890	Chicago, Illinois, U.S.	
14	Win	13–0–1	Ed Bartlett	KO	3 (?)	Nov 23, 1890	Sheffield, Indiana, U.S.	
13	Win	12–0–1	Con Doyle	TKO	28 (?)	Oct 5, 1890	Barn, Shelby, Indiana, U.S.	
12	Win	11–0–1	John McInerssey	KO	5 (?)	Aug 7, 1890	Chicago, Illinois, U.S.	
11	Win	10–0–1	Bob Harper	KO	4 (?)	Aug 4, 1890	Chicago, Illinois, U.S.	
10	Win	9–0–1	Henry Baker	KO	3 (?)	Jun 6, 1890	Grand Rapids, Michigan, U.S.	
9	Draw	8–0–1	Jimmy Murphy	PTS	57 (?)	Oct 10, 1889	Grand Rapids, Michigan, U.S.	
8	Win	8–0	Martin Shaughnessy	KO	48 (?)	Jun 18, 1889	Lake St. Clair Beach, Grosse Point, Michigan, U.S.	
7	Win	7–0	Michael Dunn	KO	9 (?)	May 27, 1889	Ice House, Grosse Point, Michigan, U.S.	
6	Win	6–0	Martin Shaughnessy	KO	23 (?)	Apr 30, 1889	Detroit, Michigan, U.S.	
5	Win	5–0	Dick England	KO	23 (?)	Dec 21, 1888	Lake City, Michigan, U.S.	
4	Win	4–0	Joe Johnson	KO	5 (?)	Jul 20, 1888	Marion, Michigan, U.S.	
3	Win	3–0	Chris Christopher	KO	10 (?)	Mar 3, 1887	Grand Rapids, Michigan, U.S.	
2	Win	2–0	Jack Conway	KO	3 (?)	Feb 2, 1887	Rock Island, Illinois, U.S.	
1	Win	1–0	John Case	KO	5 (?)	Jan 1, 1887	United States of America	

=== Unofficial record ===
106 fights	87 wins	2 losses
By knockout	68	1
By decision	18	0
By disqualification	1	1
Draws	14	
No contests	3	

Record with the inclusion of newspaper decisions in the win/loss/draw column.

No.	Result	Record	Opponent	Type	Round	Date	Location	Notes
106	NC	87–2–14 (3)	Ed Martin	NC	6	Nov 29, 1911	Armory, Portland, Oregon, U.S.	Ryan was the promoter. This was an exhibition Martin subbed for Fritz Holland
105	Draw	87–2–14 (2)	Hugo Kelly	PTS	6	Mar 4, 1907	Bartholomay Pavilion, Charlotte, New York, U.S.	
104	Win	87–2–13 (2)	Dave Barry	KO	5 (20)	Feb 5, 1907	Bell Opera House, Benton Harbor, Michigan, U.S.	
103	Win	86–2–13 (2)	Billy Stift	KO	4 (10)	Dec 29, 1904	Bell Opera House, Benton Harbor, Michigan, U.S.	
102	NC	85–2–13 (2)	Jack Root	NC	4 (6)	Nov 23, 1904	National A.C., Philadelphia, Pennsylvania, U.S.	
101	Win	85–2–13 (1)	Jack Graham	TKO	4 (10)	Nov 15, 1904	South Bend, Indiana, U.S.	
100	Win	84–2–13 (1)	Tommy Wallace	KO	5 (10)	Oct 26, 1904	Bell Opera House, Benton Harbor, Michigan, U.S.	
99	Win	83–2–13 (1)	Bob Douglass	KO	4 (8)	Oct 10, 1904	Jai Alai Club, Saint Louis, Missouri, U.S.	
98	Win	82–2–13 (1)	Jack Beauscholte	TKO	6 (10)	Feb 24, 1904	Auditorium, Indianapolis, Indiana, U.S.	
97	Draw	81–2–13 (1)	Philadelphia Jack O'Brien	NWS	6	Jan 27, 1904	National A.C., Philadelphia, Pennsylvania, U.S.	
96	Win	81–2–12 (1)	John Willie	KO	4 (20)	Jun 30, 1903	Broadway Theater, Butte, Montana, U.S.	
95	Draw	80–2–12 (1)	Dan Hickey	PTS	6	Jun 23, 1903	Auditorium, Battle Creek, Michigan, U.S.	
94	Win	80–2–11 (1)	James J Walker	KO	5 (?)	Jun 1, 1903	Battle Creek, Michigan, U.S.	
93	Win	79–2–11 (1)	Cyclone Kelly	TKO	7 (10)	Feb 3, 1903	Whittington Park A.C., Hot Springs, Arkansas, U.S.	
92	Win	78–2–11 (1)	Billy Stift	KO	4 (10)	Jan 15, 1903	Delaware Club, Kansas City, Missouri, U.S.	
91	Win	77–2–11 (1)	Barney Walsh	KO	2 (6)	Oct 3, 1902	Turner Hall, Kansas City, Missouri, U.S.	
90	Win	76–2–11 (1)	Jack Beauscholte	KO	3 (6)	Oct 3, 1902	Turner Hall, Kansas City, Missouri, U.S.	
89	Win	75–2–11 (1)	Kid Carter	KO	6 (20)	Sep 15, 1902	International A.C., Fort Erie, Canada	Retained world middleweight title
88	Win	74–2–11 (1)	Johnny Gorman	KO	3 (15)	Jun 24, 1902	National Sporting Club, Covent Garden, London	Retained world middleweight title
87	Win	73–2–11 (1)	Jimmy Handler	TKO	4 (10)	May 26, 1902	Turner Hall, Kansas City, Missouri, U.S.	
86	Win	72–2–11 (1)	Billy Stift	PTS	10	Apr 3, 1902	Turner Hall, Kansas City, Missouri, U.S.	
85	Win	71–2–11 (1)	Mysterious Billy Smith	KO	4 (10)	Mar 14, 1902	Turner Hall, Kansas City, Missouri, U.S.	
84	Win	70–2–11 (1)	Tim Draffin Murphy	KO	8 (10)	Feb 25, 1902	Strope's Hall, Kansas City, Missouri, U.S.	
83	Win	69–2–11 (1)	Jack Beauscholte	PTS	6	Feb 15, 1902	De Soto Club, Chicago, Illinois, U.S.	
82	Win	68–2–11 (1)	George Green	KO	7 (10)	Jan 30, 1902	3rd Regiment Armory, Kansas City, Missouri, U.S.	Retained world middleweight title
81	Loss	67–2–11 (1)	George Green	DQ	6 (15)	Oct 10, 1901	Jackson County Democratic Club, Kansas City, Missouri, U.S.	Ryan was disqualified for striking Green with his knee
80	Win	67–1–11 (1)	Bob Douglass	TKO	7 (10)	Aug 22, 1901	Kansas City, Missouri, U.S.	
79	Win	66–1–11 (1)	Tommy West	TKO	17 (20)	Mar 4, 1901	Auditorium, Louisville, Kentucky, U.S.	Retained world middleweight title
78	Win	65–1–11 (1)	Jim Judge	KO	4 (6)	Jan 31, 1901	Minneapolis A.C., Minneapolis, Minnesota, U.S.	
77	Win	64–1–11 (1)	Jack Beauscholte	KO	3 (20)	Jan 17, 1901	City Hall, Springfield, Ohio, U.S.	
76	Win	63–1–11 (1)	Kid Carter	PTS	6	Nov 27, 1900	Tattersall's, Chicago, Illinois, U.S.	
75	Win	62–1–11 (1)	Geoff Thorne	KO	3 (6)	Nov 10, 1900	Chicago A.C., Chicago, Illinois, U.S.	
74	Draw	61–1–11 (1)	Jack Root	PTS	6	Jul 24, 1900	Tattersall's, Chicago, Illinois, U.S.	
73	Win	61–1–10 (1)	Young Mahoney	PTS	6	Jun 29, 1900	Fort Dearborn A.C., Chicago, Illinois, U.S.	
72	Draw	60–1–10 (1)	Charles Kid McCoy	PTS	6	May 29, 1900	Tattersall's, Chicago, Illinois, U.S.	
71	Win	60–1–9 (1)	George Lawler	TKO	13 (20)	Feb 2, 1900	Auditorium, Hot Springs, Arkansas, U.S.	
70	Win	59–1–9 (1)	Frank Craig	TKO	10 (20)	Sep 18, 1899	Coney Island A.C., Brooklyn, New York City, New York, U.S.	Retained world middleweight title
69	Win	58–1–9 (1)	Jack Moffat	PTS	20	Aug 31, 1899	Auditorium for fistic carnival, Dubuque, U.S.	Retained world middleweight title
68	Win	57–1–9 (1)	Billy Stift	PTS	20	Apr 19, 1899	Saengerfest Hall, Davenport, Iowa, U.S.	
67	Win	56–1–9 (1)	Frank Neal	KO	6 (20)	Apr 6, 1899	Tuxedo A.C., Dubuque, Iowa, U.S.	
66	Win	55–1–9 (1)	Paddy Purtell	TKO	4 (10)	Mar 13, 1899	Robinson Opera House, Cincinnati, Ohio, U.S.	
65	Win	54–1–9 (1)	Charley Johnson	KO	8 (20)	Mar 1, 1899	Whittington Park, Hot Springs, Arkansas, U.S.	Retained world middleweight title
64	Win	53–1–9 (1)	Dick O'Brien	TKO	14 (25)	Dec 23, 1898	Coliseum, Hartford, Connecticut, U.S.	Retained world middleweight title
63	NC	52–1–9 (1)	Tommy West	NC	6	Dec 2, 1898	Arena A.C., Philadelphia, Pennsylvania, U.S.	
62	Win	52–1–9	Johnny Gorman	RTD	8 (20)	Nov 23, 1898	Turn Hall, Syracuse, New York, U.S.	Retained world middleweight title
61	Win	51–1–9	Jack Bonner	NWS	6	Nov 8, 1898	Arena A.C., Philadelphia, Pennsylvania, U.S.	
60	Win	50–1–9	Jack Bonner	PTS	20	Oct 24, 1898	Greater New York A.C., Brooklyn, New York City, New York, U.S.	Retained world middleweight title
59	Win	49–1–9	Tommy West	TKO	14 (20)	Jun 13, 1898	Lenox A.C., New York City, New York, U.S.	Retained world middleweight title
58	Win	48–1–9	George Green	KO	18 (20)	Feb 25, 1898	Woodward's Pavilion, San Francisco, California, U.S.	Retained world middleweight title
57	Win	47–1–9	Bill Heffernan	KO	3 (20)	Dec 20, 1897	Olympic A.C., Buffalo, New York, U.S.	Won vacant world middleweight title
56	Win	46–1–9	Billy Stift	TKO	6 (12)	Nov 30, 1897	Battery D Armory, Chicago, Illinois, U.S.	
55	Win	45–1–9	Australian Jim Ryan	KO	5 (20)	Nov 25, 1897	Maple Avenue A.C., Elmira, New York, U.S.	
54	Draw	44–1–9	Charles Kid McCoy	PTS	5	Sep 8, 1897	Alhambra, Syracuse, New York, U.S.	
53	Win	44–1–8	Tom Williams	KO	2 (20)	Jun 21, 1897	Alhambra, Syracuse, New York, U.S.	
52	Win	43–1–8	Patsy Raedy	TKO	6 (20)	May 24, 1897	Rienzi A.C., Rochester, New York, U.S.	
51	Win	42–1–8	Paddy Gorman	TKO	3 (?)	May 10, 1897	Rienzi A.C., Rochester, New York, U.S.	
50	Win	41–1–8	Patsy Raedy	TKO	18 (20)	Mar 17, 1897	Rienzi A.C., Rochester, New York, U.S.	
49	Win	40–1–8	Tom Tracey	TKO	9 (20)	Feb 24, 1897	Alhambra, Syracuse, New York, U.S.	Retained world welterweight title
48	Win	39–1–8	Billy Payne	KO	4 (20)	Dec 23, 1896	Alhambra, Syracuse, New York, U.S.	
47	Win	38–1–8	Billy McCarthy	TKO	7 (20)	Dec 21, 1896	Empire A.C., Buffalo, New York, U.S.	
46	Win	37–1–8	Mysterious Billy Smith	DQ	9 (20)	Nov 25, 1896	Empire A.C., Maspeth, Queens, New York City, New York, U.S.	
45	Win	36–1–8	Dick Moore	PTS	20	Aug 20, 1896	Lyceum Theater, Buffalo, New York, U.S.	
44	Win	35–1–8	Billy (Shadow) Maber	TKO	9 (20)	Jun 22, 1896	Lyceum Theater, Buffalo, New York, U.S.	
43	Win	34–1–8	Joe Dunfee	KO	6 (20)	May 18, 1896	Empire A.C., Buffalo, New York, U.S.	
42	Loss	33–1–8	Charles Kid McCoy	KO	15 (20)	Mar 2, 1896	Empire A.C., Maspeth, Queens, New York City, New York, U.S.	For vacant world middleweight title
41	Win	33–0–8	Henry Baker	PTS	6	Jan 15, 1896	Powers' Opera House, Grand Rapids, Michigan, U.S.	
40	Draw	32–0–8	Mysterious Billy Smith	PTS	18 (25)	May 27, 1895	Sea Side A.C., Coney Island, New York, U.S.	Retained world welterweight title; Stopped when the police intervened, with Smith hanging helpless on the ropes
39	Win	32–0–7	Tom Tracey	TKO	8 (8)	Mar 20, 1895	Tattersall's, Chicago, Illinois, U.S.	
38	Win	31–0–7	Emmett Mellody	PTS	4	Mar 11, 1895	Auditorium, Kansas City, Missouri, U.S.	
37	Win	30–0–7	Shorty Ahearn	NWS	4	Feb 25, 1895	Triangle AC, Chicago, Illinois, U.S.	
36	Win	29–0–7	Nonpareil Dempsey	TKO	3 (15)	Jan 18, 1895	Sea Side A.C., Coney Island, New York, U.S.	
35	Win	28–0–7	Billy Layton	KO	4 (20)	Sep 13, 1894	Saint Joseph, Missouri, U.S.	
34	Win	27–0–7	Mysterious Billy Smith	PTS	20	Jul 26, 1894	Twin City A.C., Minneapolis, Minnesota, U.S.	Retained world welterweight title; Won world welterweight title claim
33	Win	26–0–7	Jack Pitts	KO	3 (?)	Jun 1, 1894	Minneapolis, Minnesota, U.S.	
32	Win	25–0–7	Jack Falvey	KO	3 (8)	May 22, 1894	Foot Guard Hall, Hartford, Connecticut, U.S.	
31	Win	24–0–7	Harry Wilkes	NWS	5	Apr 22, 1894	Olympic Theatre, Saint Louis, Missouri, U.S.	
30	Win	23–0–7	Morris Lane	TKO	3 (8)	Apr 10, 1894	Savin Rock, West Haven, Connecticut, U.S.	
29	Draw	22–0–7	Mysterious Billy Smith	PTS	6	Jan 9, 1894	Casino, Boston, Massachusetts, U.S.	
28	Draw	22–0–6	Joe Guthrie	PTS	3 (10)	Dec 11, 1893	Opera House, Naugatuck, Connecticut, U.S.	Guthrie was practically knocked out, as he lay on the floor an outsider rang the bell. Referee declared he could have fought on if the bell wasn't rung
27	Win	22–0–5	Harry Jamieson	KO	2 (?)	Nov 2, 1893	Waterbury, Connecticut, U.S.	
26	Draw	21–0–5	Mysterious Billy Smith	PTS	6	Aug 29, 1893	Coney Island A.C., Brooklyn, New York City, New York, U.S.	
25	Win	21–0–4	George Dawson	NWS	6	Apr 8, 1893	2nd Regiment Armory, Chicago, Illinois, U.S.	
24	Draw	20–0–4	Tommy Kelly	PTS	8	Dec 1, 1892	Detroit, Michigan, U.S.	Exact date unknown
23	Draw	20–0–3	Jack Collins	PTS	8	Nov 24, 1892	Auditorium, Detroit, Michigan, U.S.	
22	Draw	20–0–2	Jack Wilkes	PTS	17 (?)	Jul 30, 1892	Germania Hall, South Omaha, Nebraska, U.S.	Retained world welterweight title; The bout was stopped by police in the 17th round and was declared a draw
21	Win	20–0–1	Paddy Brennan	PTS	10	May 7, 1892	Dubuque, Iowa, U.S.	
20	Win	19–0–1	Con Doyle	PTS	8	Apr 11, 1892	Grand Opera House, Dubuque, Iowa, U.S.	
19	Win	18–0–1	Frank Howson	KO	14 (?)	Dec 13, 1891	skating rink, near Chicago, Illinois, U.S.	Retained world welterweight title
18	Win	17–0–1	Billy McMillan	KO	3 (?)	Aug 8, 1891	Richardson, Illinois, U.S.	Retained world welterweight title
17	Win	16–0–1	Danny Needham	RTD	76 (?)	Feb 17, 1891	Twin City A.C., Minneapolis, Minnesota, U.S.	Won vacant world welterweight title
16	Win	15–0–1	Professor McGuire	TKO	3 (5)	Dec 6, 1890	Chicago, Illinois, U.S.	
15	Win	14–0–1	Frank Garrard	NWS	3	Dec 6, 1890	Chicago, Illinois, U.S.	
14	Win	13–0–1	Ed Bartlett	KO	3 (?)	Nov 23, 1890	Sheffield, Indiana, U.S.	
13	Win	12–0–1	Con Doyle	TKO	28 (?)	Oct 5, 1890	Barn, Shelby, Indiana, U.S.	
12	Win	11–0–1	John McInerssey	KO	5 (?)	Aug 7, 1890	Chicago, Illinois, U.S.	
11	Win	10–0–1	Bob Harper	KO	4 (?)	Aug 4, 1890	Chicago, Illinois, U.S.	
10	Win	9–0–1	Henry Baker	KO	3 (?)	Jun 6, 1890	Grand Rapids, Michigan, U.S.	
9	Draw	8–0–1	Jimmy Murphy	PTS	57 (?)	Oct 10, 1889	Grand Rapids, Michigan, U.S.	
8	Win	8–0	Martin Shaughnessy	KO	48 (?)	Jun 18, 1889	Lake St. Clair Beach, Grosse Point, Michigan, U.S.	
7	Win	7–0	Michael Dunn	KO	9 (?)	May 27, 1889	Ice House, Grosse Point, Michigan, U.S.	
6	Win	6–0	Martin Shaughnessy	KO	23 (?)	Apr 30, 1889	Detroit, Michigan, U.S.	
5	Win	5–0	Dick England	KO	23 (?)	Dec 21, 1888	Lake City, Michigan, U.S.	
4	Win	4–0	Joe Johnson	KO	5 (?)	Jul 20, 1888	Marion, Michigan, U.S.	
3	Win	3–0	Chris Christopher	KO	10 (?)	Mar 3, 1887	Grand Rapids, Michigan, U.S.	
2	Win	2–0	Jack Conway	KO	3 (?)	Feb 2, 1887	Rock Island, Illinois, U.S.	
1	Win	1–0	John Case	KO	5 (?)	Jan 1, 1887	United States of America	

== See also ==
- Lineal championship
- List of welterweight boxing champions
- List of middleweight boxing champions

Achievements
Preceded by Mysterious Billy Smith	World Welterweight Champion; July 26, 1894 – 1898; Vacated	Vacant Title next held by Mysterious Billy Smith
Vacant Title last held by Bob Fitzsimmons	World Middleweight Champion; October 24, 1898 – December, 1906; Retired	Vacant Title next held by Stanley Ketchel
Sporting positions
Preceded by Jimmy Barry	Oldest living world champion April 4, 1943 – August 3, 1948	Succeeded by Matty Matthews
