= Victor Rodman =

American film, radio and television actor

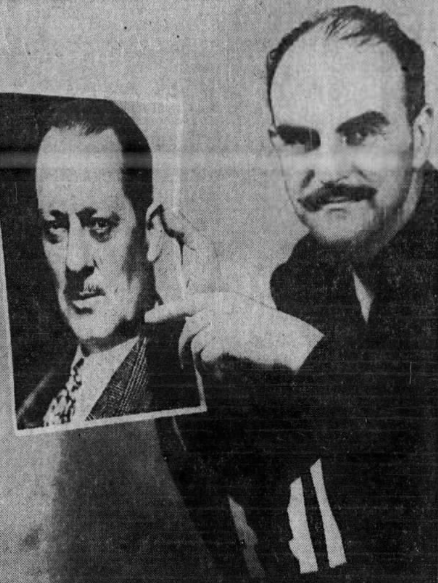
- Rodman in 1935
- Born: Victor Rottman Jr. August 6, 1892; Arkansas, U.S.
- Died: June 29, 1965 (aged 72); Los Angeles, California, U.S.
- Occupations: Film, radio and television actor
- Spouse: Dagmar Dahlgren

Victor Rottman Jr. (August 6, 1892 – June 29, 1965) was an American film, radio and television actor. He was known for playing Dr. Sam Rinehart in the American drama television series Noah's Ark.

== Life and career ==
Rodman was born in Arkansas, the son of Willie Rottman. He began his screen career in 1914, appearing in the short film Dippy's Dream. The next year, he appeared in twelve short films. During his screen career, he appeared on radio programs such as Magazine, Gunsmoke, Barrie Craig, Confidential Investigator, Cavalcade of America, Lux Radio Theatre, Suspense, The Whistler, Speed Gibson of the International Secret Police, This is Your FBI, Tales of the Texas Rangers and The Count of Monte Cristo.

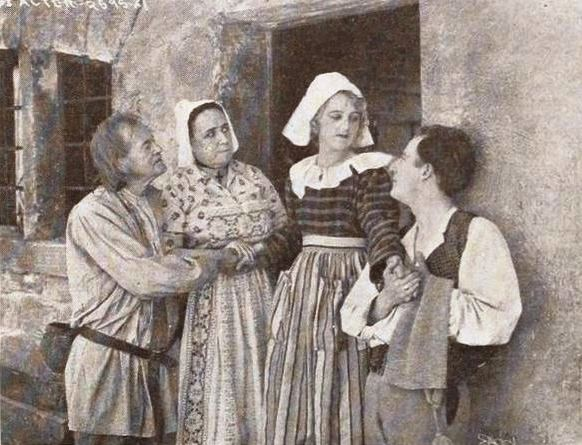
Rodman (right) with Ella Hall and unidentified actor and unidentified actress in The Spotted Lily, 1917

Later in his career, Rodman made his television debut in the NBC television series Dragnet. In 1956, he starred as Dr. Sam Rinehart in the NBC drama television series Noah's Ark, starring along with Paul Burke and May Wynn. After the series ended in 1957, he guest-starred in television programs including Peter Gunn, Death Valley Days, Lock-Up, Man Without a Gun, I Led 3 Lives, Perry Mason and Wanted Dead or Alive, and also in films such as Hold Your Breath and The Long, Hot Summer.

Rodman retired from acting in 1965, last appearing in the film Brainstorm.

== Death ==
Rodman died on June 29, 1965, in Los Angeles, California, at the age of 72.
