= Jack Root =

Czech boxer

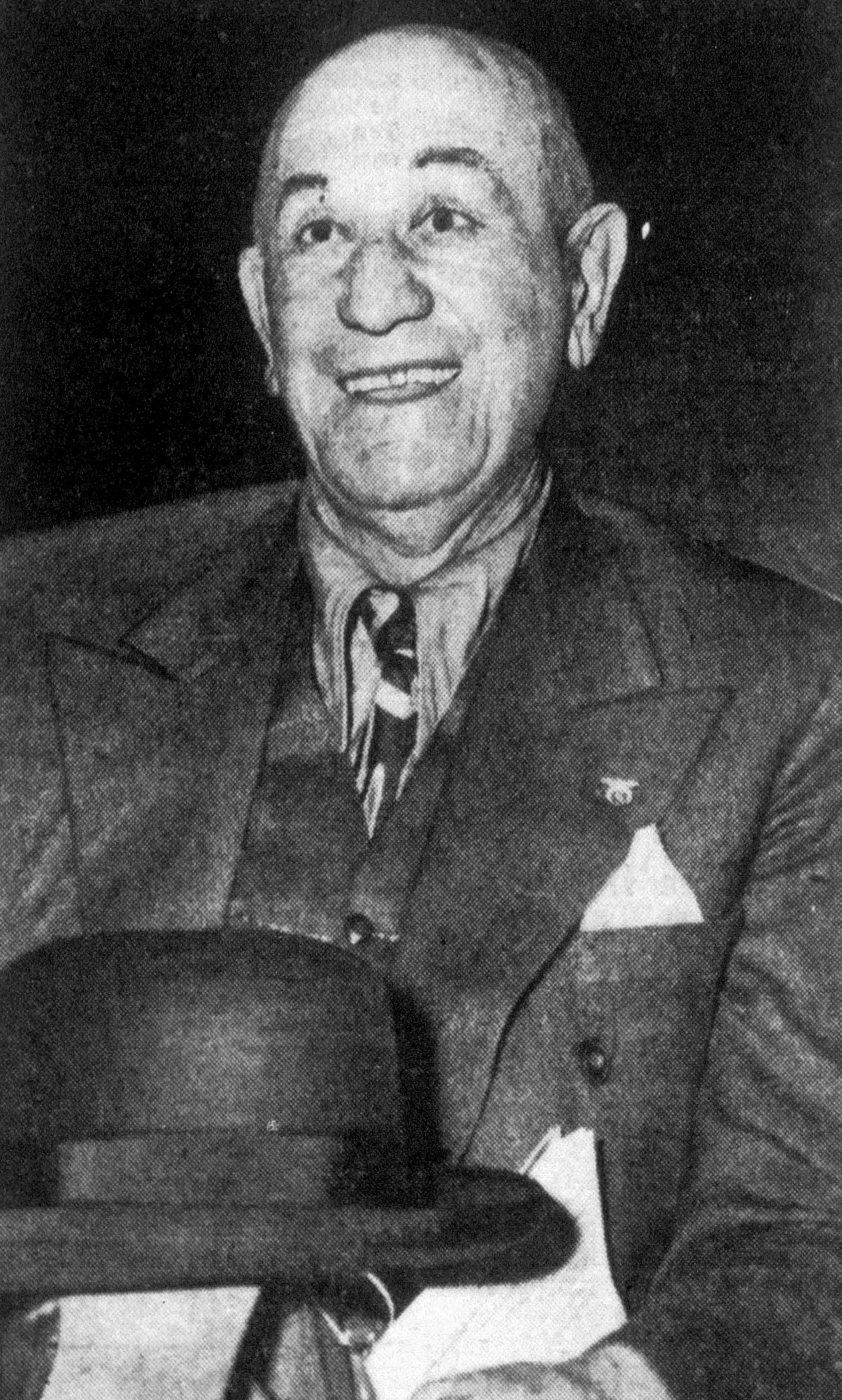
- Root, circa 1949

Personal information
- Nationality: American
- Born: John Arthur Root; May 26, 1875 Frahelž, Austria-Hungary
- Died: June 10, 1963 (aged 87) Los Angeles, California, U.S.
- Weight: Light Heavyweight Heavyweight

Boxing career

Boxing record
- Total fights: 55
- Wins: 47
- Win by KO: 28
- Losses: 3
- Draws: 3
- No contests: 2

John Arthur Root, born as Jan Rut and known professionally as Jack Root (May 26, 1875 [b.] – June 10, 1963) was an American boxer. He was the first world light heavyweight champion as well as a challenger for the world heavyweight title. He fought out of Chicago. He was elected into the International Boxing Hall of Fame in 2011.

== Championship Claim ==
Root (with the support of some historians) claimed that he was the first world light heavyweight champion. His bout with George Gardiner on July 4, 1903, is claimed by some to be the first title bout in the new division. Root contended that his manager, Lou Housman, created the division and billed the Root vs. Gardner fight, which Gardner won by knockout in the twelfth round. The fight was caught on film. Jack Root, George Gardner, and Bob Fitzsimmons all held the light heavyweight world championship title in 1903.

During the 1980s, however, some boxing historians found records indicating that Joe Choynski won a twenty-round decision over Jimmy Ryan on August 18, 1899, in a fight billed as being for the light heavyweight championship. Choynski never seems to have made any claim to be the first light heavyweight champion, however.

== Heavyweight title fight ==
On July 3, 1905, Root fought Marvin Hart for the vacant world heavyweight championship in Reno Nevada. The former champion, Jim Jeffries, had retired and declared that Hart and Root were the two top heavyweights. Jeffries refereed the fight to name the new champion, which Hart won by a twelfth-round knockout.

== After boxing ==
Root served as a lieutenant in the U.S. Army during World War I. After his time in the service Root became the president and boxing manager of the renowned Los Angeles Olympic Auditorium. Root was also one of many boxers to attend the funeral of Feab S. Williams (better known as "George Godfrey").

== Death ==
Root died on June 10, 1963, at Temple Hospital in Los Angeles from a heart attack, aged 87.

== Professional boxing record ==
55 fights	47 wins	3 losses
By knockout	28	3
By decision	15	0
By disqualification	4	0
Draws	3	
No contests	2	

No.	Result	Record	Opponent	Type	Round	Date	Location	Notes
55	Win	47–3–3 (2)	Fred Russell	PTS	10	Feb 26, 1906	Kalamazoo AC, Kalamazoo, Michigan, U.S.	
54	Loss	46–3–3 (2)	Marvin Hart	KO	12 (?)	Jul 3, 1905	Amphitheater, Reno, Nevada, U.S.	For vacant world heavyweight title
53	Win	46–2–3 (2)	John Willie	DQ	5 (10)	Dec 5, 1904	Blue Island AC, Blue Island, Illinois, U.S.	
52	NC	45–2–3 (2)	Tommy Ryan	NC	4 (6)	Nov 23, 1904	National A.C., Philadelphia, Pennsylvania, U.S.	
51	Win	45–2–3 (1)	George Gardiner	PTS	6	May 2, 1904	Waverly A.C., Chicago, Illinois, U.S.	
50	Draw	44–2–3 (1)	George Gardiner	PTS	6	Feb 26, 1904	Battery D Armory, Chicago, Illinois, U.S.	
49	Draw	44–2–2 (1)	John Willie	PTS	6	Feb 5, 1904	Battery D Armory, Chicago, Illinois, U.S.	
48	Win	44–2–1 (1)	Fireman Jim Flynn	KO	8 (20)	Nov 26, 1903	Rover's Club, Pueblo, Colorado, U.S.	
47	Loss	43–2–1 (1)	George Gardiner	TKO	17 (20)	Jul 4, 1903	International A.C., Fort Erie, Ontario, Canada	Lost world light heavyweight title
46	Win	43–1–1 (1)	Charles Kid McCoy	PTS	10	Apr 22, 1903	Light Guard Armory, Detroit, Michigan, U.S.	Won inaugural world light heavyweight title
45	Win	42–1–1 (1)	Marvin Hart	PTS	6	Nov 10, 1902	Lyceum A.C., Chicago, Illinois, U.S.	
44	Win	41–1–1 (1)	Kid Carter	PTS	6	Oct 27, 1902	American A.C., Chicago, Illinois, U.S.	
43	Loss	40–1–1 (1)	George Gardiner	TKO	17 (20)	Aug 18, 1902	Saucer Track, Salt Lake City, Utah, U.S.	
42	Win	40–0–1 (1)	Billy Stift	KO	2 (6)	Apr 26, 1902	Chicago A.C., Chicago, Illinois, U.S.	
41	Win	39–0–1 (1)	George Gardiner	DQ	7 (20)	Jan 31, 1902	Music Hall, Louisville, Kentucky, U.S.	
40	Win	38–0–1 (1)	Australian Jim Ryan	KO	2 (20)	Oct 30, 1901	Music Hall, Louisville, Kentucky, U.S.	Won vacant Middleweight Championship of the West
39	Win	37–0–1 (1)	Kid Carter	DQ	15 (20)	Jun 28, 1901	Woodward's Pavilion, San Francisco, California, U.S.	Low Blow
38	Win	36–0–1 (1)	George Byers	KO	9 (20)	Jan 18, 1901	Woodward's Pavilion, San Francisco, California, U.S.	
37	Win	35–0–1 (1)	Dick O'Brien	KO	3 (6)	Oct 16, 1900	Tattersall's, Chicago, Illinois, U.S.	
36	Win	34–0–1 (1)	Dan Creedon	KO	1 (20)	Oct 4, 1900	Convention Hall, Kansas City, Missouri, U.S.	
35	Draw	33–0–1 (1)	Tommy Ryan	PTS	6	Jul 24, 1900	Tattersall's, Chicago, Illinois, U.S.	
34	Win	33–0 (1)	Dick O'Brien	PTS	6	Jul 10, 1900	Tattersall's, Chicago, Illinois, U.S.	
33	Win	32–0 (1)	Ed Denfass	KO	4 (6)	Feb 20, 1900	Tattersall's, Chicago, Illinois, U.S.	
32	Win	31–0 (1)	Jack Hammond	KO	2 (6)	Feb 5, 1900	Badger A.C., Milwaukee, Wisconsin, U.S.	
31	Win	30–0 (1)	Tommy West	PTS	6	Jan 9, 1900	Tattersall's, Chicago, Illinois, U.S.	
30	Win	29–0 (1)	Alec Greggains	KO	6 (20)	Nov 15, 1899	Woodward's Pavilion, San Francisco, California, U.S.	
29	Win	28–0 (1)	Frank Steiner	KO	3 (6)	Oct 18, 1899	Belle City Opera House, Racine, Wisconsin, U.S.	
28	Win	27–0 (1)	Frank Craig	PTS	6	Oct 15, 1899	Chicago, Illinois, U.S.	
27	Win	26–0 (1)	Frank Craig	PTS	6	Oct 3, 1899	Tattersall's, Chicago, Illinois, U.S.	
26	Win	25–0 (1)	Billy Stift	PTS	6	Sep 23, 1899	Tattersall's, Chicago, Illinois, U.S.	
25	Win	24–0 (1)	John Banks	KO	1 (?)	Aug 12, 1899	Chicago, Illinois, U.S.	
24	Win	23–0 (1)	Fred Grant	KO	3 (?)	Jul 7, 1899	Chicago, Illinois, U.S.	
23	Win	22–0 (1)	Johnny Gorman	KO	2 (?)	Jun 21, 1899	Adelphi Theater, Chicago, Illinois, U.S.	
22	Win	21–0 (1)	Tom Burke	KO	7 (?)	Jun 7, 1899	Chicago, Illinois, U.S.	
21	Win	20–0 (1)	Tom Casey	KO	1 (?)	May 31, 1899	Adelphi Theater, Chicago, Illinois, U.S.	
20	Win	19–0 (1)	Australian Jim Ryan	PTS	20	May 15, 1899	Music Hall, Louisville, Kentucky, U.S.	
19	Win	18–0 (1)	Dick Moore	KO	2 (?)	Apr 29, 1899	Lyceum Theater, Chicago, Illinois, U.S.	
18	Win	17–0 (1)	Billy Stift	DQ	7 (20)	Feb 16, 1899	Claus Groth Hall, Davenport, Iowa, U.S.	Won vacant Northwest middleweight title
17	Win	16–0 (1)	Harry Peppers	PTS	6	Jan 21, 1899	Tattersall's, Chicago, Illinois, U.S.	
16	Win	15–0 (1)	Australian Jim Ryan	PTS	6	Dec 30, 1898	7th Regiment Armory, Chicago, Illinois, U.S.	
15	Win	14–0 (1)	Tom Lansing	KO	5 (6)	Nov 15, 1898	Madison Hall, Chicago, Illinois, U.S.	
14	Win	13–0 (1)	Jack Murphy	KO	2 (?)	Aug 19, 1898	United States of America	
13	Win	12–0 (1)	Jimmy Watts	KO	2 (?)	Aug 5, 1898	Lenox A.C., New York City, New York, U.S.	
12	Win	11–0 (1)	Tom Lansing	TKO	6 (12)	Jul 22, 1898	Lenox A.C., New York City, New York, U.S.	
11	Win	10–0 (1)	Jack Moffat	PTS	6	May 14, 1898	American A.C., Chicago, Illinois, U.S.	
10	Win	9–0 (1)	Mike Carroll	KO	1 (6)	Apr 14, 1898	Calumet A.C., Chicago, Illinois, U.S.	
9	NC	8–0 (1)	George Ryan	NC	1 (?)	Mar 27, 1898	Chicago A.A., Chicago, Illinois, U.S.	The police stopped this bout after 1 round
8	Win	8–0	Jack Moffat	PTS	6	Mar 26, 1898	Chicago A.A., Chicago, Illinois, U.S.	
7	Win	7–0	Jack Hammond	KO	2 (?)	Mar 12, 1898	Chicago A.A., Chicago, Illinois, U.S.	
6	Win	6–0	Charles Whitey	KO	2 (?)	Feb 12, 1898	Chicago A.A., Chicago, Illinois, U.S.	
5	Win	5–0	Billy Philleth	KO	1 (?)	Feb 7, 1898	America A.A., Chicago, Illinois, U.S.	
4	Win	4–0	George Hipp	KO	1 (?)	Jan 15, 1898	Chicago, Illinois, U.S.	
3	Win	3–0	Young Charlie White	KO	2 (?)	Jan 8, 1898	Chicago, Illinois, U.S.	
2	Win	2–0	Pat Brastand	KO	3 (?)	Dec 24, 1897	Chicago, Illinois, U.S.	
1	Win	1–0	Charles Upton	KO	4 (?)	Nov 12, 1897	Chicago, Illinois, U.S.	

== See also ==
- List of light heavyweight boxing champions

Achievements
Inaugural Champion	World Light Heavyweight Champion; April 22, 1903 – July 4, 1903	Succeeded by George Gardiner
