= Dagmar Dahlgren =

American actress

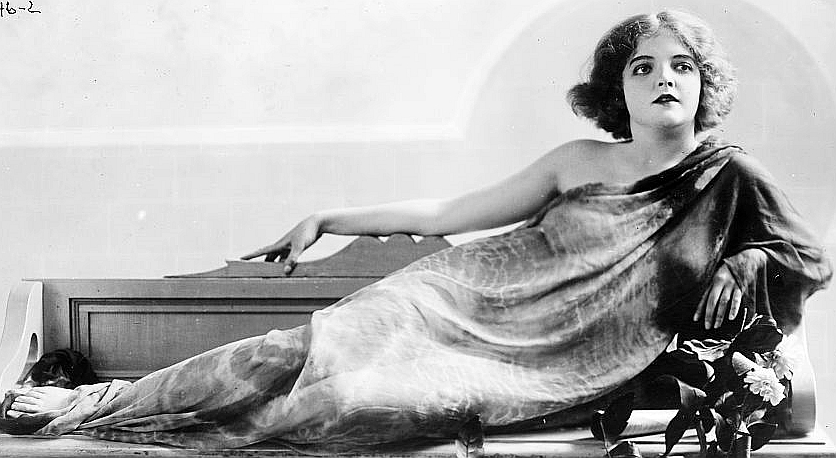
- Born: Dagmar Sophie Dahlgren; January 17, 1880; Oakland, California, US
- Died: October 20, 1951 (aged 71); Oakland, California
- Occupations: Dancer; singer; film actress
- Spouses: Lambert R. Hynes; Norman Selby; Victor Rodman; Alek Kipper; Herbert S. Calvert

Dagmar Dahlgren (January 17, 1880 - October 20, 1951) was a dancer, singer and actress of the silent film era from Los Angeles, California. Her career in acting lasted from 1920 to 1922.

== Biography ==
Dagmar Sophie Dahlgren was born in Oakland, California, the daughter of immigrants from Denmark. She was a dance pupil of Isadora Duncan. In 1913, she married Lambert R. Hynes, an Oakland firefighter, but the marriage ended with his death almost five years later.

In April 1920, Dahlgren became the eighth wife of Norman Selby, known in boxing as Kid McCoy. Dahlgren and McCoy lived together for only three days. In 1924, McCoy was charged with first degree murder for the killing of Teresa Mora, a wealthy woman who was found dead with a picture of McCoy in her hand. McCoy, who received a package of jewelry from Mora prior to her death, contended Mora committed suicide. Dahlgren disputed one of McCoy's alibis during his trial for murder in Los Angeles. She denied to her attorney that she had seen him in the two years prior to Mora's death. A jury sentenced McCoy on a compromise verdict of manslaughter.

Dahlgren was married at least three more times. In chronological order she wed actor Victor Rodman (1892–1965), her vaudeville partner Alek Kipper, and Berkeley, California, dance teacher Herbert S. Calvert. She married Calvert in May 1935 after accusing him of trying to smother her with a pillow in April of the same year.

In her last years she lived in seclusion in Oakland and died there in 1951.

== Filmography ==
- The Man Haters (1922)
- Late Hours (1921)
- The Chink (1921)
- Stop Kidding (1921)
- A Straight Crook (1921)
- Hurry West (1921)
- Hobgoblins (1921)
- The Love Lesson (1921)
- Running Wild (1921)
- Prince Pistachio (1921)
- Oh, Promise Me (1921)
- Pinning It On (1921)
- The Burglars Bold (1921)
- Sleepy Head (1920)
- Greek Meets Greek (1920)
- Queens Up! (1920)
- Mamma's Boy (1920)

== Other sources ==
- Coshocton Tribune, "Alienists Say McCoy Is Sane", August 20, 1924, Page 4.
- Dunkirk Evening Observer, "McCoy Had A Way With Women", December 4, 1924, Page 13.
- The Helena Independent, "Fight Knockouts Did Not Defeat McCoy-Tackles Old Foe Again", August 4, 1937, Page 10.
- Lincoln State Journal, "Spoils Kid McCoy's Alibi", August 30, 1924, Page 2.
- Los Angeles Times, "Woman Asserts Betrothed Tried To Smother Her", April 24, 1935, Page A1.
- Oakland Tribune, "Eighth Wife of Kid McCoy Remarries", May 20, 1935, Page 3.
