= Kid McCoy =

American boxer (1872–1940)

Charles "Kid" McCoy
- McCoy in 1899

Personal information
- Nationality: American
- Born: Norman Selby; October 13, 1872 Moscow, Indiana, U.S.
- Died: April 18, 1940 (aged 67) Detroit, Michigan, U.S.
- Height: 5 ft 11 in (1.80 m)
- Weight: Middleweight

Boxing career

Boxing record
- Total fights: 100
- Wins: 79
- Win by KO: 59
- Losses: 6
- Draws: 11
- No contests: 4

Charles "Kid" McCoy (October 13, 1872 – April 18, 1940), born Norman Selby, was an American boxer and early Hollywood actor. He claimed the vacant world middleweight title when he scored an upset victory over Tommy Ryan by 15th-round knockout.

== Overview ==
Born in Moscow, Rush County, Indiana, McCoy would eventually weigh 160 pounds (73 kg), stand 5 feet 11 inches (180 cm), and go on to a record 81 wins (55 by KO, with 6 losses, 9 no decision, and 6 disqualifications). McCoy was noted for his "corkscrew punch" – a blow delivered with a twisting of the wrist. (Note: The corkscrew punch, in boxing, is a blow delivered with a twisting of the wrist. Kid McCoy is often credited for inventing it. It was believed, in McCoy's era, that the technique added power to a punch and sometimes cut the skin of opponents. In that era, boxers had much less hand protection. Other boxers known for using the technique include Harry Harris (1880–1959). Muhammed Ali (1942–2016) used a similar technique, but different enough to claim he invented it.) According to McCoy, he learned the punch one evening while resting in someone's barn after a day of riding the rails. He was of Scottish and English ancestry. He noticed a cat strike at a ball of string and imitated its actions. Whether true or not, McCoy was known as a fast, "scientific" fighter who would cut his opponents with sharp blows. He reportedly would wrap his knuckles in mounds of friction tape, to better cut his opponents faces. He was listed # 1 Light Heavyweight of all time in Fifty Years At Ringside, published in 1958. He was also regarded as a formidable puncher, and was included in Ring Magazine's list of 100 greatest punchers of all time.

== Boxing career ==
Tommy Ryan was knocked out by Kid McCoy in the 15th round on March 2, 1896. This bout forms part of the lore of the McCoy legend. McCoy served as a sparring partner for Ryan, and absorbed many beatings at the hands of his employer. Ryan was notorious for showing little mercy to his sparring partners.

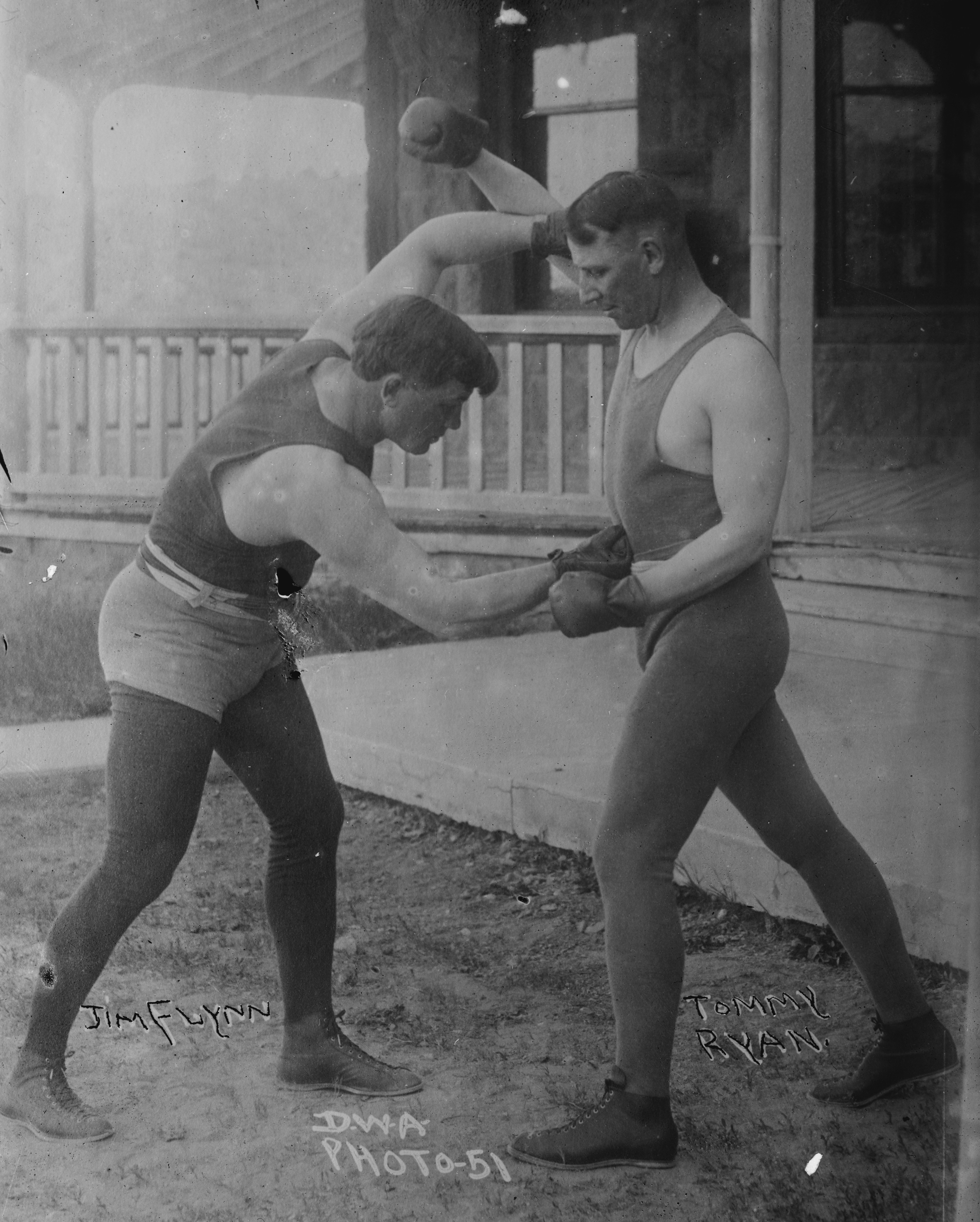
Tommy Ryan and Fireman Jim Flynn, between 1910 and 1915.

As a result, McCoy hated Ryan, and sought revenge. It is alleged that McCoy, who appeared thin, pale and frail, persuaded Ryan that he was seriously ill before their fight. McCoy, who was famed as a trickster, purportedly rubbed flour on his face so as to appear deathly ill. Ryan is said to have fallen for the ruse, failed to train properly and was not in top condition for the bout. Whether true or not, McCoy scored an upset win over Ryan in a fight billed for the American and World 154lbs Middleweight Title.

Another one of McCoy's tactics was demonstrated while McCoy was on a tour of Australia and some other Pacific Islands. To supplement his income, he would take on all comers. In one unidentified port, McCoy, who scarcely weighed 160 pounds (73 kg), agreed to box a huge native reputed to weigh in excess of 250 pounds (110 kg). McCoy watched him train and noted the man fought in his bare feet. When the fight began, McCoy's corner threw handfuls of tacks into the ring, causing the bare-footed challenger to drop his guard and raise up one foot. As soon as he did so, McCoy lowered the boom on his distracted adversary.

Although slight of build, McCoy captured the world middleweight championship by defeating Dan Creedon. McCoy never defended the title, choosing to abandon the crown to enable him to pursue the world heavyweight championship. Despite his handicap in size, McCoy battled the best heavyweights of his era, and defeated Joe Choynski and Peter Maher. He was defeated by Tom Sharkey and Jim Corbett. The Corbett fight was the subject of controversy, as the ending was suspect and Corbett's estranged wife claimed the bout was fixed. Although, she later recanted her statement.

== "The real McCoy" ==
It has been incorrectly asserted the expression "The Real McCoy" originally referred to Kid McCoy. One origin involves a local tough who bumped into McCoy and laughed when he was told the fellow he was annoying was Kid McCoy. He then challenged McCoy to fight, and upon reviving from being knocked out allegedly remarked "Oh my God, that was the real McCoy". However, it is believed that the first publication of the phrase with this spelling occurred in James S. Bond's 1881 dime novel, The Rise and Fall of the "Union club": or, Boy life in Canada, wherein a character utters, "By jingo! yes; so it will be It's the 'real McCoy,' as Jim Hicks says." Skeptics point out that Kid McCoy was only nine years old when this was published. (Note: The etymology of the expression, "the real McCoy," has also been attributed to Elijah McCoy (1844–1929), a Canadian-born African-American inventor and engineer.)

== Personal life ==
McCoy was married ten times, performed in theater, and went west to California during the birth of the movie industry in Los Angeles. He appeared in films, including a scene fighting Wallace Reid in the 1922 film, The World's Champion. McCoy was also friends with several movie stars of the day, including Charles Chaplin and director D. W. Griffith, who directed the 1919 silent film, Broken Blossoms, Selby's second film as actor.

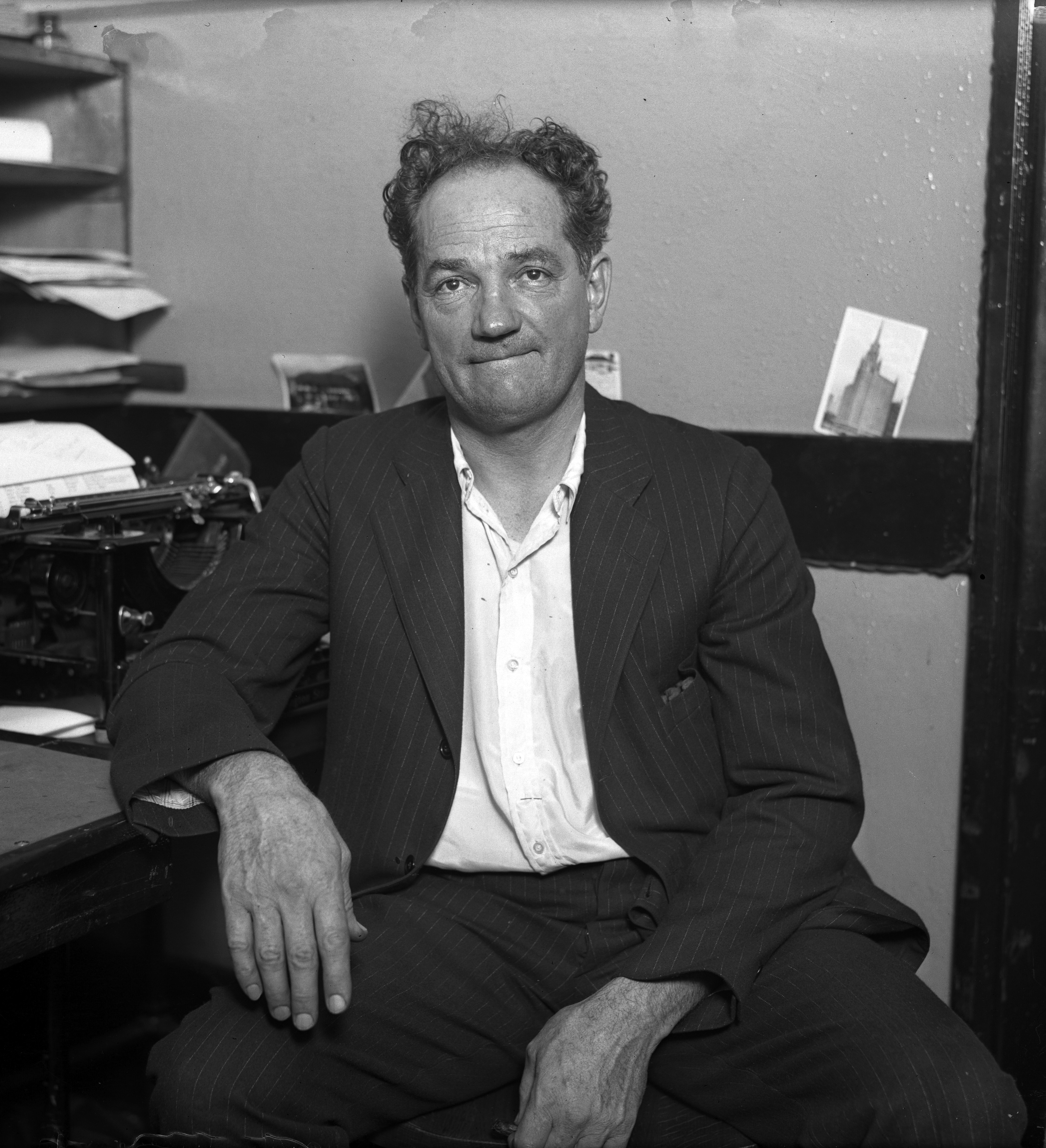
McCoy after his arrest for the murder of Teresa Mors

=== Legal Issues ===
By the early 1920s McCoy was poor, addicted to alcohol and out of the movie industry. At this time he was involved in a romance with a wealthy married woman, Teresa Mors. Mors's divorce from her husband was acrimonious and dragged on until she was killed by a single gunshot to the head on August 12, 1924, in the apartment she shared with McCoy at 2819 Leeward (Unit 212).

The next morning, a reportedly disheveled McCoy robbed and held several people captive at Mrs. Mors' antique shop, and shot one man in the leg after he tried to escape. He also forced at least six other men to remove their trousers, and took their money. McCoy was apprehended and charged with the murder of Mrs. Mors. His trial took place in downtown Los Angeles. McCoy claimed Mrs. Mors committed suicide, while the prosecution claimed he murdered her for financial gain. The jury was split between first degree murder and acquittal. As a compromise verdict, McCoy was convicted of manslaughter.

McCoy was sent to San Quentin, but was paroled from prison in 1932. Afterwards he worked for Ford Motor Company.

=== Marriages ===
| 1895–1898: | Charlott Piehler, married Selby July 31, 1895, in Middleton, Ohio. Selby was then known as Charles "Kid" Young. In a suit filed by Piehler in Hamilton County, Ohio, a divorce decree – rendered by default due to Selby's failure to show-up in court – was awarded February 21, 1898, in favor of Piehler. |
| 1897–1897: | Charlotte Smith; married Selby in St. Louis; Charlotte divorced Selby in Hamilton, Ohio. |
| 1897–1900: | Julia Crosselman (née Julia Ella Woodruff; 1874–1952); Julia's other husbands include (a) George A. Wheelock (1858–1922), whom she married February 1912 in Jersey City, (b) Ralph Thompson, and (c) Crosselman. |
| 1901–1901: | Julia Crosselman; re-married Selby January 7, 1901, in Boston. |
| 1902–1903: | Julia Crosselman; re-married Selby April 11, 1902, in Hoboken, New Jersey; divorced June 9, 1903. (see List of people who remarried the same spouse) |
| 1903–1904: | Indiola Arnold (née Indiola Alice Arnold; 1885–1978), married Selby December 14, 1903, in New York; she was a showgirl; she divorced Selby April 5, 1905, in Providence, Rhode Island. |
| 1905–1910: | Lillian Ellis (aka Lillian Estelle Earle); widow of Edward C. Ellis (1877–1904), Lillian married Selby October 19, 1905, in Manhattan. When they married Lillian's net worth was estimated to be from $5 to $7 million (the latter, adjusted for inflation, is approximately equivalent to $250,833,333 in 2025). Lillian was a close friend of Julia, Selby's former wife. Earle and Selby divorced December 1910. |
| 1911–1917: | Edna Fernanda Valentine (maiden; 1886–1950) married Selby October 27, 1911, in Gaston County, North Carolina. Her marriage to Selby was her second of three. |
| 1920–1920: | Dagmar Dahlgren (aka Carmen M. Crowder; 1880–1951) married Selby April 22, 1920, in Los Angeles County They reportedly lived together only 3 days. Their divorce was finalized September 4, 1920. |
| 1922: | Jacqueline McDowell almost married Selby in 1922. But, after embarking by train from Baltimore to meet him in Los Angeles, she thought better of it and got off in Detroit and telegraphed that she was not going any further. |
| 1924: | Selby, in Los Angeles County, was tried for murder, but convicted of manslaughter, for the death of his lover, Teresa Moers (née Theresa Weinstein; 1893–1924), who was married to Albert Abraham Moers. She died of a gunshot wound to the head on August 12, 1924 – in an apartment she shared with McCoy. |
| 1937–1940: | Sue Cobb Cowley (née Susan Ethel Cobb; 1892–1970) married Selby (her 4th) in 1937 and filed two marriage certificates: (i) one in Rush County, Indiana, on August 2, 1937, and (ii) one in Detroit on August 28, 1937 |

=== Extended family ===
Norman Selby was one of six siblings and third oldest. One of his four sisters, Grace Esther Selby (maiden; 1885–1916) was, from 1901 to 1908, married to Charles Thomas Henshall (1862–1928). Norman was an uncle to their daughter, actress Barbara Jo Allen (1906–1974).

== Death and legacy ==
McCoy took his own life in Detroit on April 18, 1940. Even his death was enigmatic. He committed suicide at the Hotel Tuller in Detroit by an overdose of sleeping pills, leaving a note behind. It read, among other things

Everything in my possession, I want to go to my dear wife, Sue E. Selby ... To all my dear friends ... best of luck ... sorry I could not endure this world's madness.

— Norman Selby

In an apparent last attempt to drop his professional moniker, the note was pointedly signed as, "Norman Selby."

British professional wrestler Mark Boothman (the son of wrestler Phil "King Ben" Boothman) adopted the "Kid McCoy" name and won the British Lightweight Championship in 1987, holding it for three years.

== Selected filmography and publications ==
=== Filmography ===
As actor

- 1913: The Great Jewel Robbery
- 1918: The House of Glass
- 1919: Eyes of Youth
- 1919: Broken Blossoms
- 1920: The Fourteenth Man
- 1920: The Honey Bee
- 1922: The World's Champion
- 1922: Oath-Bound
- 1922: Tom Mix in Arabia
- 1923: April Showers

As subject

- 1989: Brutal Glory, highly fictionalized film, loosely about Norman Selby

=== Publications ===
As subject

- 2002: The Real McCoy, by Darin Strauss; (2002, 2003); OCLC 1036774632, 52697958; ISBN 0452284414; ISBN 9780452284418; OCLC 1036820050 (Dutch language)

== Professional boxing record ==
All information in this section is derived from BoxRec, unless otherwise stated.

=== Official record ===
| 100 fights | 74 wins | 6 losses |
|---|---|---|
| By knockout | 59 | 4 |
| By decision | 12 | 2 |
| By disqualification | 3 | 0 |
| Draws | 9 | |
| No contests | 4 | |
| Newspaper decisions/draws | 7 | |

All newspaper decisions are officially regarded as “no decision” bouts and are not counted in the win/loss/draw column.

| No. | Result | Record | Opponent | Type | Round | Date | Location | Notes |
|---|---|---|---|---|---|---|---|---|
| 100 | Win | 74–6–9 (11) | P.O. Matthew Curran | PTS | 20 | Jan 20, 1912 | Palais de la Jetée-Promenade, Nice, Alpes-Maritimes, France | |
| 99 | Win | 73–6–9 (11) | George Gunther | PTS | 10 | Jan 10, 1912 | Salle Wagram, Paris, Paris, France | |
| 98 | Win | 72–6–9 (11) | Harry Croxon | KO | 3 (10) | Dec 20, 1911 | Salle Wagram, Paris, Paris, France | |
| 97 | Win | 71–6–9 (11) | Jim Savage | KO | 4 (10) | Oct 6, 1911 | Brown's Gym A.A., Far Rockaway, Queens, New York City, New York, U.S. | |
| 96 | Win | 70–6–9 (11) | Kid Elle | KO | 1 (10) | Sep 22, 1911 | Brown's Gym, Manhattan, New York City, New York, U.S. | |
| 95 | Win | 69–6–9 (11) | Bob Day | KO | 1 (8) | Sep 4, 1911 | Island Stadium, Toronto, Ontario, Canada | |
| 94 | Win | 68–6–9 (11) | Jack Fitzgerald | NWS | 6 | Mar 20, 1911 | American A.C., Philadelphia, Pennsylvania, U.S. | |
| 93 | Win | 68–6–9 (10) | Jim Stewart | NWS | 6 | Oct 16, 1908 | National A.C., Manhattan, New York City, New York, U.S. | |
| 92 | Win | 68–6–9 (9) | Peter Maher | KO | 2 (6) | Jul 24, 1908 | Sulzer Park, Manhattan, New York City, New York, U.S. | |
| 91 | Win | 67–6–9 (9) | Jack Crawford | KO | 1 (20) | Mar 3, 1905 | Whittington Park A.C., Hot Springs, Arkansas, U.S. | |
| 90 | Win | 66–6–9 (9) | Jack Twin Sullivan | PTS | 20 | Sep 27, 1904 | Hazard's Pavilion, Los Angeles, California, U.S. | |
| 89 | Draw | 65–6–9 (9) | Philadelphia Jack O'Brien | NWS | 6 | May 14, 1904 | 2nd Regiment Armory, Philadelphia, Pennsylvania, U.S. | |
| 88 | Win | 65–6–9 (8) | Henry Placke | TKO | 2 (6) | Apr 5, 1904 | Lenox A.C., Philadelphia, Pennsylvania, U.S. | |
| 87 | Loss | 64–6–9 (8) | Jack Root | PTS | 10 | Apr 22, 1903 | Light Guard Armory, Detroit, Michigan, U.S. | For inaugural world light-heavyweight title |
| 86 | Win | 64–5–9 (8) | Jack McCormick | NWS | 6 | Feb 23, 1903 | Washington S.C., Philadelphia, Pennsylvania, U.S. | |
| 85 | Loss | 64–5–9 (7) | Kid Carter | NWS | 6 | May 19, 1902 | Industrial A.C., Philadelphia, Pennsylvania, U.S. | |
| 84 | Win | 64–5–9 (6) | Fred Russell | NWS | 6 | May 2, 1902 | Industrial A.C., Philadelphia, Pennsylvania, U.S. | |
| 83 | Win | 64–5–9 (5) | David Barry | TKO | 2 (4) | Dec 2, 1901 | Wonderland, Whitechapel Road, Mile End, London, England, United Kingdom | |
| 82 | Win | 63–5–9 (5) | Jack Scales | KO | 1 (3) | Dec 2, 1901 | Wonderland, Whitechapel Road, Mile End, London, England, United Kingdom | |
| 81 | Win | 62–5–9 (5) | Sandy Ferguson | DQ | 4 (4) | Dec 2, 1901 | Wonderland, Whitechapel Road, Mile End, London, England, United Kingdom | |
| 80 | Loss | 61–5–9 (5) | James J. Corbett | KO | 5 (25) | Aug 30, 1900 | Madison Square Garden, Manhattan, New York City, New York, U.S. | |
| 79 | Win | 61–4–9 (5) | Jack Bonner | TKO | 13 (25) | Jun 1, 1900 | Broadway A.C., Manhattan, New York City, New York, U.S. | Retained American and world middleweight titles |
| 78 | Draw | 60–4–9 (5) | Tommy Ryan | PTS | 6 | May 29, 1900 | Tattersall's, Chicago, Illinois, U.S. | |
| 77 | Win | 60–4–8 (5) | Dan Creedon | TKO | 6 (20) | May 18, 1900 | Broadway A.C., Manhattan, New York City, New York, U.S. | |
| 76 | Win | 59–4–8 (5) | Joe Choynski | RTD | 4 (25) | Jan 12, 1900 | Broadway A.C., Brooklyn, New York City, New York, U.S. | |
| 75 | Win | 58–4–8 (5) | Peter Maher | KO | 5 (25) | Jan 1, 1900 | Coney Island Stadium, Brooklyn, New York City, New York, U.S. | |
| 74 | Win | 57–4–8 (5) | Jack McDonough | KO | 4 (?) | Nov 9, 1899 | Hawthorne A.C., Buffalo, New York, U.S. | |
| 73 | Win | 56–4–8 (5) | Billy Stift | KO | 13 (20) | Oct 27, 1899 | Coliseum, Saint Louis, Minnesota, U.S. | |
| 72 | Draw | 55–4–8 (5) | Joe Choynski | PTS | 6 | Oct 6, 1899 | Star Theatre, Chicago, Illinois, U.S. | |
| 71 | Win | 55–4–7 (5) | Jack McCormick | TKO | 8 (20) | Sep 27, 1899 | Broadway A.C., Brooklyn, New York City, New York, U.S. | |
| 70 | Win | 54–4–7 (5) | Steve O'Donnell | KO | 6 (20) | Sep 19, 1899 | Broadway A.C., Brooklyn, New York City, New York, U.S. | |
| 69 | Win | 53–4–7 (5) | Geoff Thorne | KO | 3 (20) | Sep 5, 1899 | Broadway A.C., Brooklyn, New York City, New York, U.S. | |
| 68 | Loss | 52–4–7 (5) | Jack McCormick | KO | 1 (6) | Aug 18, 1899 | Star Theatre, Chicago, Illinois, U.S. | |
| 67 | Win | 52–3–7 (5) | Jim Carter | KO | 5 (10) | Aug 14, 1899 | Club Theatre, Joplin, Missouri, U.S. | |
| 66 | Win | 51–3–7 (5) | Tom Duggan | TKO | 2 (5) | Aug 10, 1899 | Saengerfest Hall, Davenport, Iowa, U.S. | |
| 65 | Win | 50–3–7 (5) | Jack Graham | TKO | 4 (5) | Aug 10, 1899 | Saengerfest Hall, Davenport, Iowa, U.S. | |
| 64 | Win | 49–3–7 (5) | Joe Choynski | PTS | 20 | Mar 24, 1899 | Mechanic's Pavilion, San Francisco, California, U.S. | |
| 63 | Loss | 48–3–7 (5) | Tom Sharkey | KO | 10 (20) | Jan 10, 1899 | Lenox A.C., Manhattan, New York City, New York, U.S. | |
| 62 | Win | 48–2–7 (5) | Joe Goddard | DQ | 5 (6) | Dec 16, 1898 | Arena A.C., Philadelphia, Pennsylvania, U.S. | |
| 61 | Win | 47–2–7 (5) | Gus Ruhlin | PTS | 20 | Mar 20, 1898 | Alhambra, Syracuse, New York, U.S. | |
| 60 | Win | 46–2–7 (5) | Jim Bates | KO | 1 (4) | Mar 11, 1898 | Princess Rink, Fort Wayne, Indiana, U.S. | |
| 59 | ND | 45–2–7 (5) | Vern Hardenbrook | ND | 4 | Mar 11, 1898 | Princess Rink, Fort Wayne, Indiana, U.S. | |
| 58 | Win | 45–2–7 (4) | Nick Burley | KO | 2 (?) | Mar 4, 1898 | Whitington Park, Hot Springs, Arkansas, U.S. | |
| 57 | Win | 44–2–7 (4) | Dan Creedon | RTD | 15 (25) | Dec 17, 1897 | Long Island City AC Arena, Long Island City, Queens, New York City, New York, U.S. | Retained world middleweight title |
| 56 | Win | 43–2–7 (4) | Australian Billy Smith | TKO | 2 (6) | Nov 15, 1897 | 2nd Regiment Armory, Chicago, Illinois, U.S. | |
| 55 | Win | 42–2–7 (4) | George LaBlanche | KO | 1 (4) | Nov 12, 1897 | Opera House, Dayton, Ohio, U.S. | |
| 54 | Win | 41–2–7 (4) | Beech Ruble | TKO | 2 (4) | Nov 12, 1897 | Opera House, Dayton, Ohio, U.S. | |
| 53 | ND | 40–2–7 (4) | Jim Hall | NC | 5 (6) | Oct 18, 1897 | Quaker City A.C., Philadelphia, Pennsylvania, U.S. | This bout was scheduled for six rounds but was such a palpable fake the referee stopped it and declared it a no-contest |
| 52 | Draw | 40–2–7 (3) | Tommy Ryan | PTS | 5 | Sep 8, 1897 | Alhambra, Syracuse, New York, U.S. | Referee George Siler said there was no reason for the police to have intervened in this bout. He ruled the fight a draw |
| 51 | Win | 40–2–6 (3) | Dan Bayliff | KO | 3 (?) | Aug 13, 1897 | Casino Hall, Dayton, Ohio, U.S. | |
| 50 | Win | 39–2–6 (3) | Dick Moore | KO | 2 (20) | Jul 22, 1897 | Olympic A.C., Buffalo, New York, U.S. | |
| 49 | Win | 38–2–6 (3) | Nick Burley | KO | 3 (20) | Jul 5, 1897 | Manhattan A.C., Troy, Manhattan, New York City, New York, U.S. | |
| 48 | Win | 37–2–6 (3) | Jack Bonner | NWS | 6 | May 31, 1897 | Quaker City A.C., Philadelphia, Pennsylvania, U.S. | |
| 47 | Win | 37–2–6 (2) | Dick O'Brien | TKO | 10 (25) | May 26, 1897 | Palace A.C., Manhattan, New York City, New York, U.S. | |
| 46 | Win | 36–2–6 (2) | Mike Creedon | KO | 2 (?) | May 6, 1897 | Bijou Theater, Pittsburgh, Pennsylvania, U.S. | |
| 45 | Win | 35–2–6 (2) | Mike O`Hara | KO | 1 (?) | May 6, 1897 | Bijou Theater, Pittsburgh, Pennsylvania, U.S. | |
| 44 | Win | 34–2–6 (2) | Jack Graham | KO | 2 (4) | Apr 24, 1897 | Grand OPera House, Indianapolis, Indiana, U.S. | |
| 43 | Win | 33–2–6 (2) | Bill Doherty | KO | 9 (20) | Dec 26, 1896 | The Amphitheatre, Johannesburg, Gauteng, Cape Colony | Retained world middleweight title; Won South African middleweight title |
| 42 | ND | 32–2–6 (2) | Jimmy Fox | ND | 4 | Oct 10, 1896 | Art A.C., Philadelphia, Pennsylvania, U.S. | |
| 41 | Win | 32–2–6 (1) | Dick Moore | PTS | 10 | May 30, 1896 | Empire Theater, Brooklyn, New York City, New York, U.S. | |
| 40 | Win | 31–2–6 (1) | Mysterious Billy Smith | DQ | 6 (15) | May 18, 1896 | Newton Street Armory, Boston, Massachusetts, U.S. | Retained world middleweight title |
| 39 | Win | 30–2–6 (1) | Jim Daly | TKO | 2 (12) | May 7, 1896 | New Manhattan A.C., Manhattan, New York City, New York, U.S. | |
| 38 | Win | 29–2–6 (1) | Frank Bosworth | KO | 2 (10) | Apr 22, 1896 | Memphis, Tennessee, U.S. | |
| 37 | Win | 28–2–6 (1) | Tommy Ryan | KO | 15 (20) | Mar 2, 1896 | Empire A.C., Maspeth, Queens, New York City, New York, U.S. | Won vacant world middleweight title |
| 36 | Win | 27–2–6 (1) | Tommy West | KO | 2 (10) | Jan 31, 1896 | New Manhattan A.C., Manhattan, New York City, New York, U.S. | |
| 35 | ND | 26–2–6 (1) | Charles Johnson | ND | 4 | Jan 8, 1896 | Caledonian A.C., Philadelphia, Pennsylvania, U.S. | |
| 34 | Loss | 26–2–6 | Ted White | PTS | 10 | Nov 25, 1895 | National Sporting Club, Covent Garden, London, England, United Kingdom | |
| 33 | Win | 26–1–6 | Abe Ullman | TKO | 13 (20) | Oct 7, 1895 | Front Street Theater, Baltimore, Maryland, U.S. | |
| 32 | Win | 25–1–6 | Dick Moore | TKO | 6 (20) | Sep 2, 1895 | Buckingham Theater, Louisville, Kentucky, U.S. | |
| 31 | Draw | 24–1–6 | Dick O'Brien | PTS | 25 | May 20, 1895 | West Newton Street polo rink, Boston, Massachusetts, U.S. | |
| 30 | Win | 24–1–5 | Jack Wilkes | TKO | 2 (15) | Apr 19, 1895 | West Newton Street polo rink, Boston, Massachusetts, U.S. | |
| 29 | Win | 23–1–5 | Billy Maber | PTS | 10 | Mar 13, 1895 | Pastime A.C., Memphis, Tennessee, U.S. | |
| 28 | Win | 22–1–5 | Al Roberts | KO | 5 (10) | Jan 19, 1895 | Highland House, Cincinnati, Ohio, U.S. | |
| 27 | Draw | 21–1–5 | Al Roberts | PTS | 10 | Oct 29, 1894 | Highland House, Cincinnati, Ohio, U.S. | |
| 26 | Win | 21–1–4 | Billy Steffers | PTS | 10 | Aug 29, 1894 | Cleveland, Ohio, U.S. | |
| 25 | Win | 20–1–4 | Jack Grace | KO | 7 (?) | Jul 24, 1894 | Cleveland, Ohio, U.S. | |
| 24 | Win | 19–1–4 | Billy Steffers | PTS | 10 | Jul 17, 1894 | Cleveland A.C., Cleveland, Ohio, U.S. | |
| 23 | Win | 18–1–4 | Harry O`Connor | KO | 3 (?) | Jul 2, 1894 | Cleveland, Ohio, U.S. | |
| 22 | Win | 17–1–4 | Charles Maxwell | PTS | 6 | Jun 1, 1894 | Akron, Ohio, U.S. | |
| 21 | Draw | 16–1–4 | Jim Barron | PTS | 10 | May 18, 1894 | Twin City A.C., Minneapolis, Minnesota, U.S. | |
| 20 | Loss | 16–1–3 | Billy Steffers | KO | 1 (10) | May 10, 1894 | Cleveland A.C., Cleveland, Ohio, U.S. | |
| 19 | Win | 16–0–3 | Jim Scully | KO | 7 (?) | Mar 16, 1894 | New Bedford A.C., New Bedford, Ohio, U.S. | |
| 18 | Win | 15–0–3 | Joe Burke | KO | 2 (?) | Feb 12, 1894 | Fall River, Massachusetts, U.S. | |
| 17 | Win | 14–0–3 | Pat Hayden | KO | 2 (10) | Jan 8, 1894 | Metropole A.C., Providence, Rhode Island, U.S. | |
| 16 | Win | 13–0–3 | Deaf Mute | KO | 4 (?) | Oct 22, 1893 | Pittsburgh, Pennsylvania, U.S. | |
| 15 | Win | 12–0–3 | John Welch | KO | 9 (?) | Oct 13, 1893 | Belmont Park, Wheeling, West Virginia, U.S. | |
| 14 | Draw | 11–0–3 | George Bennett | PTS | 8 | Sep 26, 1893 | Akron, Ohio, U.S. | |
| 13 | Win | 11–0–2 | Frank Merritt | KO | 2 (?) | Aug 15, 1893 | Parnell Hall, Indianapolis, Indiana, U.S. | |
| 12 | Win | 10–0–2 | Dick Harris | KO | 1 (?) | Jul 30, 1893 | Marion, Indiana, U.S. | |
| 11 | Draw | 9–0–2 | Ike Boone | PTS | 19 (?) | Jul 23, 1893 | Muncie, Indiana, U.S. | Some sources reported a draw in 22nd round, but the 19th round ones contain more details |
| 10 | Win | 9–0–1 | Charles Bull McCarthy | KO | 3 (?) | Jul 6, 1893 | Athletic ball park, Muncie, Indiana, U.S. | |
| 9 | Win | 8–0–1 | Frank Murray | KO | 2 (?) | May 4, 1893 | Indianapolis, Indiana, U.S. | |
| 8 | Win | 7–0–1 | Frank Lamode | KO | 3 (?) | Feb 22, 1893 | New Orleans, Louisiana, U.S. | |
| 7 | Win | 6–0–1 | Unknown | KO | 2 (?) | Feb 12, 1893 | Milan, Tennessee, U.S. | |
| 6 | Win | 5–0–1 | Jim Conners | KO | 3 (?) | Jan 27, 1893 | Hot Springs, Arkansas, U.S. | |
| 5 | Win | 4–0–1 | Jim Dickson | KO | 5 (?) | Jan 11, 1893 | Hot Springs, Arkansas, U.S. | |
| 4 | Draw | 3–0–1 | Herbert Hale | PTS | 8 | Nov 12, 1892 | Third St. Garden, Columbus, Indiana, U.S. | |
| 3 | Win | 3–0 | Bob Lewis | KO | 1 (?) | Sep 14, 1892 | Indianapolis, Indiana, U.S. | |
| 2 | Win | 2–0 | Billy Barlow | PTS | 6 | Jun 6, 1892 | Indianapolis, Indiana, U.S. | |
| 1 | Win | 1–0 | Peter Jenkins | PTS | 4 | Jun 2, 1891 | Saint Paul, Minnesota, U.S. | |

=== Unofficial record ===
| 100 fights | 79 wins | 7 losses |
|---|---|---|
| By knockout | 59 | 4 |
| By decision | 17 | 3 |
| By disqualification | 3 | 0 |
| Draws | 10 | |
| No contests | 4 | |

Record with the inclusion of newspaper decisions in the win/loss/draw column.

| No. | Result | Record | Opponent | Type | Round | Date | Location | Notes |
|---|---|---|---|---|---|---|---|---|
| 100 | Win | 79–7–10 (4) | P.O. Matthew Curran | PTS | 20 | Jan 20, 1912 | Palais de la Jetée-Promenade, Nice, Alpes-Maritimes, France | |
| 99 | Win | 78–7–10 (4) | George Gunther | PTS | 10 | Jan 10, 1912 | Salle Wagram, Paris, Paris, France | |
| 98 | Win | 77–7–10 (4) | Harry Croxon | KO | 3 (10) | Dec 20, 1911 | Salle Wagram, Paris, Paris, France | |
| 97 | Win | 76–7–10 (4) | Jim Savage | KO | 4 (10) | Oct 6, 1911 | Brown's Gym A.A., Far Rockaway, Queens, New York City, New York, U.S. | |
| 96 | Win | 75–7–10 (4) | Kid Elle | KO | 1 (10) | Sep 22, 1911 | Brown's Gym, Manhattan, New York City, New York, U.S. | |
| 95 | Win | 74–7–10 (4) | Bob Day | KO | 1 (8) | Sep 4, 1911 | Island Stadium, Toronto, Ontario, Canada | |
| 94 | Win | 73–7–10 (4) | Jack Fitzgerald | NWS | 6 | Mar 20, 1911 | American A.C., Philadelphia, Pennsylvania, U.S. | |
| 93 | Win | 72–7–10 (4) | Jim Stewart | NWS | 6 | Oct 16, 1908 | National A.C., Manhattan, New York City, New York, U.S. | |
| 92 | Win | 71–7–10 (4) | Peter Maher | KO | 2 (6) | Jul 24, 1908 | Sulzer Park, Manhattan, New York City, New York, U.S. | |
| 91 | Win | 70–7–10 (4) | Jack Crawford | KO | 1 (20) | Mar 3, 1905 | Whittington Park A.C., Hot Springs, Arkansas, U.S. | |
| 90 | Win | 69–7–10 (4) | Jack Twin Sullivan | PTS | 20 | Sep 27, 1904 | Hazard's Pavilion, Los Angeles, California, U.S. | |
| 89 | Draw | 68–7–10 (4) | Philadelphia Jack O'Brien | NWS | 6 | May 14, 1904 | 2nd Regiment Armory, Philadelphia, Pennsylvania, U.S. | |
| 88 | Win | 68–7–9 (4) | Henry Placke | TKO | 2 (6) | Apr 5, 1904 | Lenox A.C., Philadelphia, Pennsylvania, U.S. | |
| 87 | Loss | 67–7–9 (4) | Jack Root | PTS | 10 | Apr 22, 1903 | Light Guard Armory, Detroit, Michigan, U.S. | For inaugural world light-heavyweight title |
| 86 | Win | 67–6–9 (4) | Jack McCormick | NWS | 6 | Feb 23, 1903 | Washington S.C., Philadelphia, Pennsylvania, U.S. | |
| 85 | Loss | 66–6–9 (4) | Kid Carter | NWS | 6 | May 19, 1902 | Industrial A.C., Philadelphia, Pennsylvania, U.S. | |
| 84 | Win | 66–5–9 (4) | Fred Russell | NWS | 6 | May 2, 1902 | Industrial A.C., Philadelphia, Pennsylvania, U.S. | |
| 83 | Win | 65–5–9 (4) | David Barry | TKO | 2 (4) | Dec 2, 1901 | Wonderland, Whitechapel Road, Mile End, London, England, United Kingdom | |
| 82 | Win | 64–5–9 (4) | Jack Scales | KO | 1 (3) | Dec 2, 1901 | Wonderland, Whitechapel Road, Mile End, London, England, United Kingdom | |
| 81 | Win | 63–5–9 (4) | Sandy Ferguson | DQ | 4 (4) | Dec 2, 1901 | Wonderland, Whitechapel Road, Mile End, London, England, United Kingdom | |
| 80 | Loss | 62–5–9 (4) | James J. Corbett | KO | 5 (25) | Aug 30, 1900 | Madison Square Garden, Manhattan, New York City, New York, U.S. | |
| 79 | Win | 62–4–9 (4) | Jack Bonner | TKO | 13 (25) | Jun 1, 1900 | Broadway A.C., Manhattan, New York City, New York, U.S. | Retained American and world middleweight titles |
| 78 | Draw | 61–4–9 (4) | Tommy Ryan | PTS | 6 | May 29, 1900 | Tattersall's, Chicago, Illinois, U.S. | |
| 77 | Win | 61–4–8 (4) | Dan Creedon | TKO | 6 (20) | May 18, 1900 | Broadway A.C., Manhattan, New York City, New York, U.S. | |
| 76 | Win | 60–4–8 (4) | Joe Choynski | RTD | 4 (25) | Jan 12, 1900 | Broadway A.C., Brooklyn, New York City, New York, U.S. | |
| 75 | Win | 59–4–8 (4) | Peter Maher | KO | 5 (25) | Jan 1, 1900 | Coney Island Stadium, Brooklyn, New York City, New York, U.S. | |
| 74 | Win | 58–4–8 (4) | Jack McDonough | KO | 4 (?) | Nov 9, 1899 | Hawthorne A.C., Buffalo, New York, U.S. | |
| 73 | Win | 57–4–8 (4) | Billy Stift | KO | 13 (20) | Oct 27, 1899 | Coliseum, Saint Louis, Minnesota, U.S. | |
| 72 | Draw | 56–4–8 (4) | Joe Choynski | PTS | 6 | Oct 6, 1899 | Star Theatre, Chicago, Illinois, U.S. | |
| 71 | Win | 56–4–7 (4) | Jack McCormick | TKO | 8 (20) | Sep 27, 1899 | Broadway A.C., Brooklyn, New York City, New York, U.S. | |
| 70 | Win | 55–4–7 (4) | Steve O'Donnell | KO | 6 (20) | Sep 19, 1899 | Broadway A.C., Brooklyn, New York City, New York, U.S. | |
| 69 | Win | 54–4–7 (4) | Geoff Thorne | KO | 3 (20) | Sep 5, 1899 | Broadway A.C., Brooklyn, New York City, New York, U.S. | |
| 68 | Loss | 53–4–7 (4) | Jack McCormick | KO | 1 (6) | Aug 18, 1899 | Star Theatre, Chicago, Illinois, U.S. | |
| 67 | Win | 53–3–7 (4) | Jim Carter | KO | 5 (10) | Aug 14, 1899 | Club Theatre, Joplin, Missouri, U.S. | |
| 66 | Win | 52–3–7 (4) | Tom Duggan | TKO | 2 (5) | Aug 10, 1899 | Saengerfest Hall, Davenport, Iowa, U.S. | |
| 65 | Win | 51–3–7 (4) | Jack Graham | TKO | 4 (5) | Aug 10, 1899 | Saengerfest Hall, Davenport, Iowa, U.S. | |
| 64 | Win | 50–3–7 (4) | Joe Choynski | PTS | 20 | Mar 24, 1899 | Mechanic's Pavilion, San Francisco, California, U.S. | |
| 63 | Loss | 49–3–7 (4) | Tom Sharkey | KO | 10 (20) | Jan 10, 1899 | Lenox A.C., Manhattan, New York City, New York, U.S. | |
| 62 | Win | 49–2–7 (4) | Joe Goddard | DQ | 5 (6) | Dec 16, 1898 | Arena A.C., Philadelphia, Pennsylvania, U.S. | |
| 61 | Win | 48–2–7 (4) | Gus Ruhlin | PTS | 20 | Mar 20, 1898 | Alhambra, Syracuse, New York, U.S. | |
| 60 | Win | 47–2–7 (4) | Jim Bates | KO | 1 (4) | Mar 11, 1898 | Princess Rink, Fort Wayne, Indiana, U.S. | |
| 59 | ND | 46–2–7 (4) | Vern Hardenbrook | ND | 4 | Mar 11, 1898 | Princess Rink, Fort Wayne, Indiana, U.S. | |
| 58 | Win | 46–2–7 (3) | Nick Burley | KO | 2 (?) | Mar 4, 1898 | Whitington Park, Hot Springs, Arkansas, U.S. | |
| 57 | Win | 45–2–7 (3) | Dan Creedon | RTD | 15 (25) | Dec 17, 1897 | Long Island City AC Arena, Long Island City, Queens, New York City, New York, U.S. | Retained world middleweight title |
| 56 | Win | 44–2–7 (3) | Australian Billy Smith | TKO | 2 (6) | Nov 15, 1897 | 2nd Regiment Armory, Chicago, Illinois, U.S. | |
| 55 | Win | 43–2–7 (3) | George LaBlanche | KO | 1 (4) | Nov 12, 1897 | Opera House, Dayton, Ohio, U.S. | |
| 54 | Win | 42–2–7 (3) | Beech Ruble | TKO | 2 (4) | Nov 12, 1897 | Opera House, Dayton, Ohio, U.S. | |
| 53 | NC | 41–2–7 (3) | Jim Hall | NC | 5 (6) | Oct 18, 1897 | Quaker City A.C., Philadelphia, Pennsylvania, U.S. | This bout was scheduled for six rounds but was such a palpable fake the referee stopped it and declared it a no-contest |
| 52 | Draw | 41–2–7 (2) | Tommy Ryan | PTS | 5 | Sep 8, 1897 | Alhambra, Syracuse, New York, U.S. | Referee George Siler said there was no reason for the police to have stopped this bout. He ruled the fight a draw |
| 51 | Win | 41–2–6 (2) | Dan Bayliff | KO | 3 (?) | Aug 13, 1897 | Casino Hall, Dayton, Ohio, U.S. | |
| 50 | Win | 40–2–6 (2) | Dick Moore | KO | 2 (20) | Jul 22, 1897 | Olympic A.C., Buffalo, New York, U.S. | |
| 49 | Win | 39–2–6 (2) | Nick Burley | KO | 3 (20) | Jul 5, 1897 | Manhattan A.C., Troy, Manhattan, New York City, New York, U.S. | |
| 48 | Win | 38–2–6 (2) | Jack Bonner | NWS | 6 | May 31, 1897 | Quaker City A.C., Philadelphia, Pennsylvania, U.S. | |
| 47 | Win | 37–2–6 (2) | Dick O'Brien | TKO | 10 (25) | May 26, 1897 | Palace A.C., Manhattan, New York City, New York, U.S. | |
| 46 | Win | 36–2–6 (2) | Mike Creedon | KO | 2 (?) | May 6, 1897 | Bijou Theater, Pittsburgh, Pennsylvania, U.S. | |
| 45 | Win | 35–2–6 (2) | Mike O`Hara | KO | 1 (?) | May 6, 1897 | Bijou Theater, Pittsburgh, Pennsylvania, U.S. | |
| 44 | Win | 34–2–6 (2) | Jack Graham | KO | 2 (4) | Apr 24, 1897 | Grand OPera House, Indianapolis, Indiana, U.S. | |
| 43 | Win | 33–2–6 (2) | Bill Doherty | KO | 9 (20) | Dec 26, 1896 | The Amphitheatre, Johannesburg, Gauteng, Cape Colony | Retained world middleweight title; Won South African middleweight title |
| 42 | ND | 32–2–6 (2) | Jimmy Fox | ND | 4 | Oct 10, 1896 | Art A.C., Philadelphia, Pennsylvania, U.S. | |
| 41 | Win | 32–2–6 (1) | Dick Moore | PTS | 10 | May 30, 1896 | Empire Theater, Brooklyn, New York City, New York, U.S. | |
| 40 | Win | 31–2–6 (1) | Mysterious Billy Smith | DQ | 6 (15) | May 18, 1896 | Newton Street Armory, Boston, Massachusetts, U.S. | Retained world middleweight title |
| 39 | Win | 30–2–6 (1) | Jim Daly | TKO | 2 (12) | May 7, 1896 | New Manhattan A.C., Manhattan, New York City, New York, U.S. | |
| 38 | Win | 29–2–6 (1) | Frank Bosworth | KO | 2 (10) | Apr 22, 1896 | Memphis, Tennessee, U.S. | |
| 37 | Win | 28–2–6 (1) | Tommy Ryan | KO | 15 (20) | Mar 2, 1896 | Empire A.C., Maspeth, Queens, New York City, New York, U.S. | Won vacant world middleweight title |
| 36 | Win | 27–2–6 (1) | Tommy West | KO | 2 (10) | Jan 31, 1896 | New Manhattan A.C., Manhattan, New York City, New York, U.S. | |
| 35 | ND | 26–2–6 (1) | Charles Johnson | ND | 4 | Jan 8, 1896 | Caledonian A.C., Philadelphia, Pennsylvania, U.S. | |
| 34 | Loss | 26–2–6 | Ted White | PTS | 10 | Nov 25, 1895 | National Sporting Club, Covent Garden, London, England, United Kingdom | |
| 33 | Win | 26–1–6 | Abe Ullman | TKO | 13 (20) | Oct 7, 1895 | Front Street Theater, Baltimore, Maryland, U.S. | |
| 32 | Win | 25–1–6 | Dick Moore | TKO | 6 (20) | Sep 2, 1895 | Buckingham Theater, Louisville, Kentucky, U.S. | |
| 31 | Draw | 24–1–6 | Dick O'Brien | PTS | 25 | May 20, 1895 | West Newton Street polo rink, Boston, Massachusetts, U.S. | |
| 30 | Win | 24–1–5 | Jack Wilkes | TKO | 2 (15) | Apr 19, 1895 | West Newton Street polo rink, Boston, Massachusetts, U.S. | |
| 29 | Win | 23–1–5 | Billy Maber | PTS | 10 | Mar 13, 1895 | Pastime A.C., Memphis, Tennessee, U.S. | |
| 28 | Win | 22–1–5 | Al Roberts | KO | 5 (10) | Jan 19, 1895 | Highland House, Cincinnati, Ohio, U.S. | |
| 27 | Draw | 21–1–5 | Al Roberts | PTS | 10 | Oct 29, 1894 | Highland House, Cincinnati, Ohio, U.S. | |
| 26 | Win | 21–1–4 | Billy Steffers | PTS | 10 | Aug 29, 1894 | Cleveland, Ohio, U.S. | |
| 25 | Win | 20–1–4 | Jack Grace | KO | 7 (?) | Jul 24, 1894 | Cleveland, Ohio, U.S. | |
| 24 | Win | 19–1–4 | Billy Steffers | PTS | 10 | Jul 17, 1894 | Cleveland A.C., Cleveland, Ohio, U.S. | |
| 23 | Win | 18–1–4 | Harry O`Connor | KO | 3 (?) | Jul 2, 1894 | Cleveland, Ohio, U.S. | |
| 22 | Win | 17–1–4 | Charles Maxwell | PTS | 6 | Jun 1, 1894 | Akron, Ohio, U.S. | |
| 21 | Draw | 16–1–4 | Jim Barron | PTS | 10 | May 18, 1894 | Twin City A.C., Minneapolis, Minnesota, U.S. | |
| 20 | Loss | 16–1–3 | Billy Steffers | KO | 1 (10) | May 10, 1894 | Cleveland A.C., Cleveland, Ohio, U.S. | |
| 19 | Win | 16–0–3 | Jim Scully | KO | 7 (?) | Mar 16, 1894 | New Bedford A.C., New Bedford, Ohio, U.S. | |
| 18 | Win | 15–0–3 | Joe Burke | KO | 2 (?) | Feb 12, 1894 | Fall River, Massachusetts, U.S. | |
| 17 | Win | 14–0–3 | Pat Hayden | KO | 2 (10) | Jan 8, 1894 | Metropole A.C., Providence, Rhode Island, U.S. | |
| 16 | Win | 13–0–3 | Deaf Mute | KO | 4 (?) | Oct 22, 1893 | Pittsburgh, Pennsylvania, U.S. | |
| 15 | Win | 12–0–3 | John Welch | KO | 9 (?) | Oct 13, 1893 | Belmont Park, Wheeling, West Virginia, U.S. | |
| 14 | Draw | 11–0–3 | George Bennett | PTS | 8 | Sep 26, 1893 | Akron, Ohio, U.S. | |
| 13 | Win | 11–0–2 | Frank Merritt | KO | 2 (?) | Aug 15, 1893 | Parnell Hall, Indianapolis, Indiana, U.S. | |
| 12 | Win | 10–0–2 | Dick Harris | KO | 1 (?) | Jul 30, 1893 | Marion, Indiana, U.S. | |
| 11 | Draw | 9–0–2 | Ike Boone | PTS | 19 (?) | Jul 23, 1893 | Muncie, Indiana, U.S. | Some sources reported a draw in 22nd round, but the 19th round ones contain more details |
| 10 | Win | 9–0–1 | Charles Bull McCarthy | KO | 3 (?) | Jul 6, 1893 | Athletic ball park, Muncie, Indiana, U.S. | |
| 9 | Win | 8–0–1 | Frank Murray | KO | 2 (?) | May 4, 1893 | Indianapolis, Indiana, U.S. | |
| 8 | Win | 7–0–1 | Frank Lamode | KO | 3 (?) | Feb 22, 1893 | New Orleans, Louisiana, U.S. | |
| 7 | Win | 6–0–1 | Unknown | KO | 2 (?) | Feb 12, 1893 | Milan, Tennessee, U.S. | |
| 6 | Win | 5–0–1 | Jim Conners | KO | 3 (?) | Jan 27, 1893 | Hot Springs, Arkansas, U.S. | |
| 5 | Win | 4–0–1 | Jim Dickson | KO | 5 (?) | Jan 11, 1893 | Hot Springs, Arkansas, U.S. | |
| 4 | Draw | 3–0–1 | Herbert Hale | PTS | 8 | Nov 12, 1892 | Third St. Garden, Columbus, Indiana, U.S. | |
| 3 | Win | 3–0 | Bob Lewis | KO | 1 (?) | Sep 14, 1892 | Indianapolis, Indiana, U.S. | |
| 2 | Win | 2–0 | Billy Barlow | PTS | 6 | Jun 6, 1892 | Indianapolis, Indiana, U.S. | |
| 1 | Win | 1–0 | Peter Jenkins | PTS | 4 | Jun 2, 1891 | Saint Paul, Minnesota, U.S. | |

== See also ==
- List of bare-knuckle boxers
- The Kid's Last Fight
