= Frahelž =

- Municipality
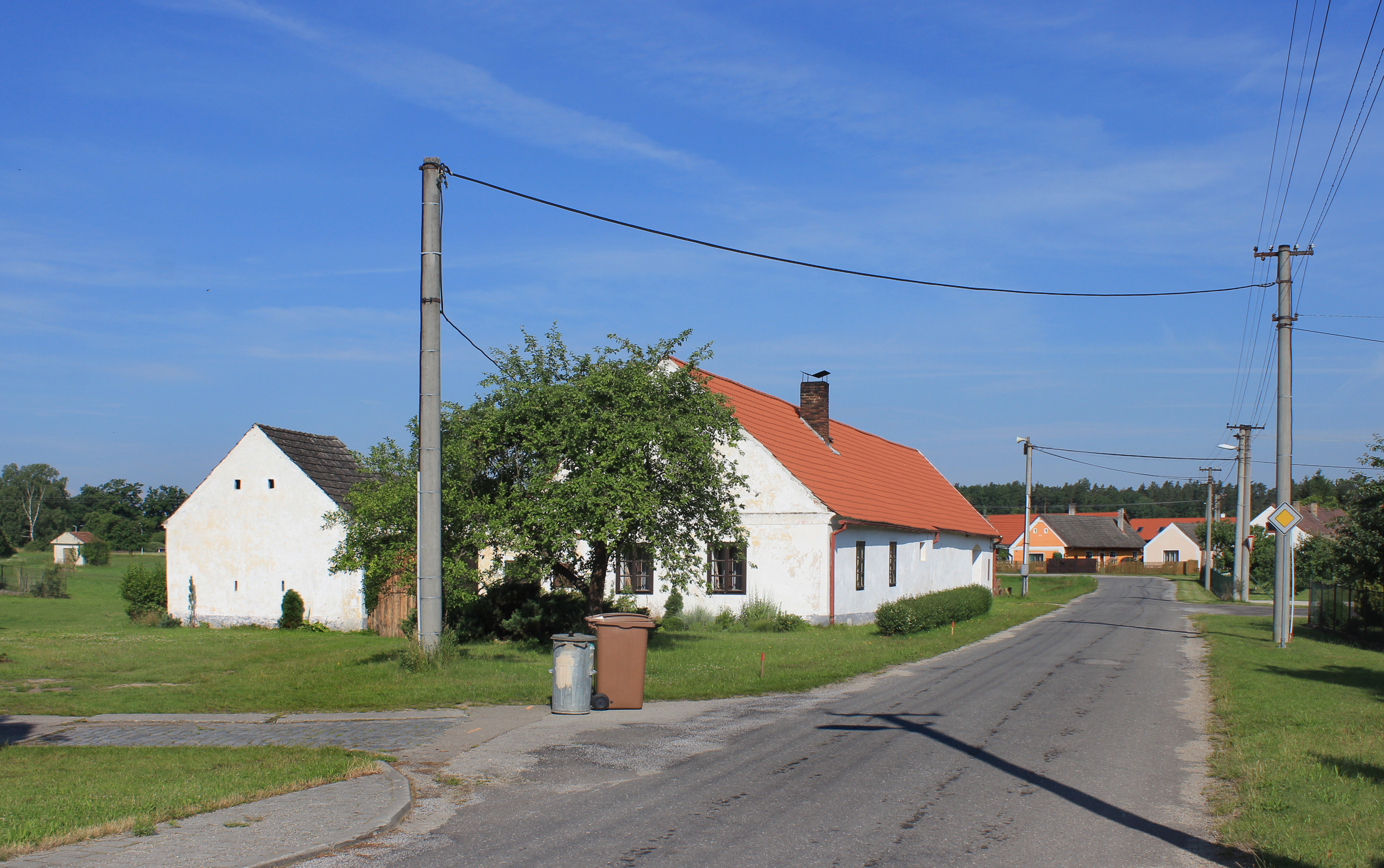
- Western part of Frahelž

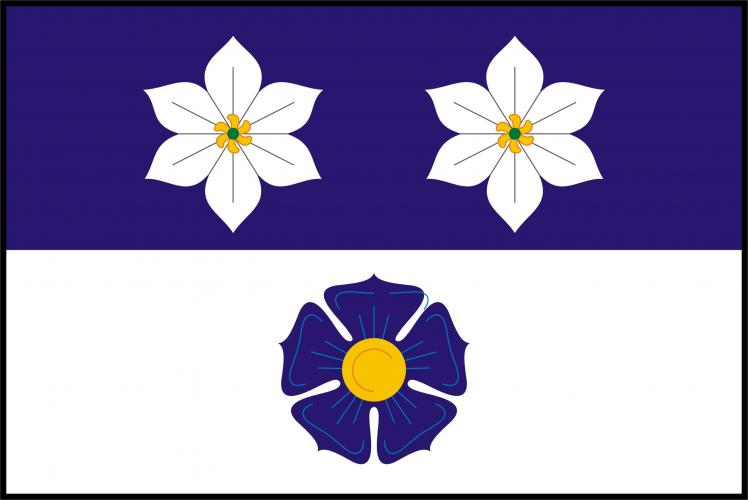
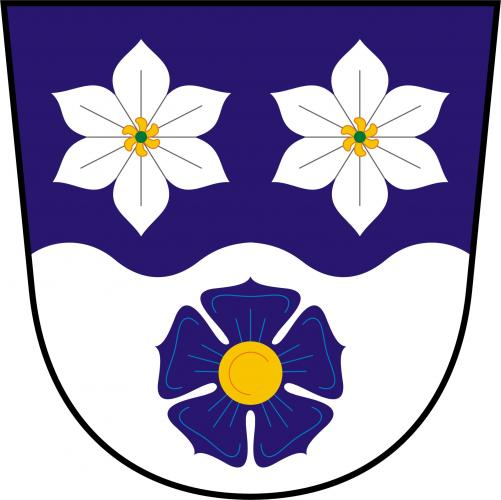
- Flag Coat of arms

- Location in the Czech Republic
- Coordinates: 49°7′2″N 14°43′55″E
- Country: Czech Republic
- Region: South Bohemian
- District: Jindřichův Hradec
- First mentioned: 1549

Area
  - Total: 3.01 km^{2} (1.16 sq mi)
- Elevation: 427 m (1,401 ft)

Population (2026-01-01)
  - Total: 155
  - Density: 51.5/km^{2} (133/sq mi)
- Time zone: UTC+1 (CET)
  - Summer (DST): UTC+2 (CEST)
- Postal code: 379 01
- Website: www.frahelz.cz

Frahelž (German: Frahelsch) is a municipality and village in Jindřichův Hradec District in the South Bohemian Region of the Czech Republic. It has about 200 inhabitants.

== Demographics ==
Historical population
Year	Pop.	±%
1869	286	—
1880	272	−4.9%
1890	291	+7.0%
1900	271	−6.9%
1910	282	+4.1%
1921	320	+13.5%
1930	284	−11.3%
1950	293	+3.2%
1961	257	−12.3%
1970	241	−6.2%
1980	202	−16.2%
1991	169	−16.3%
2001	148	−12.4%
2011	149	+0.7%
2021	148	−0.7%
Source: Censuses

== Notable people ==
- Jack Root (1875–1963), American boxer
