= The World's Champion =

1922 film by Phil Rosen

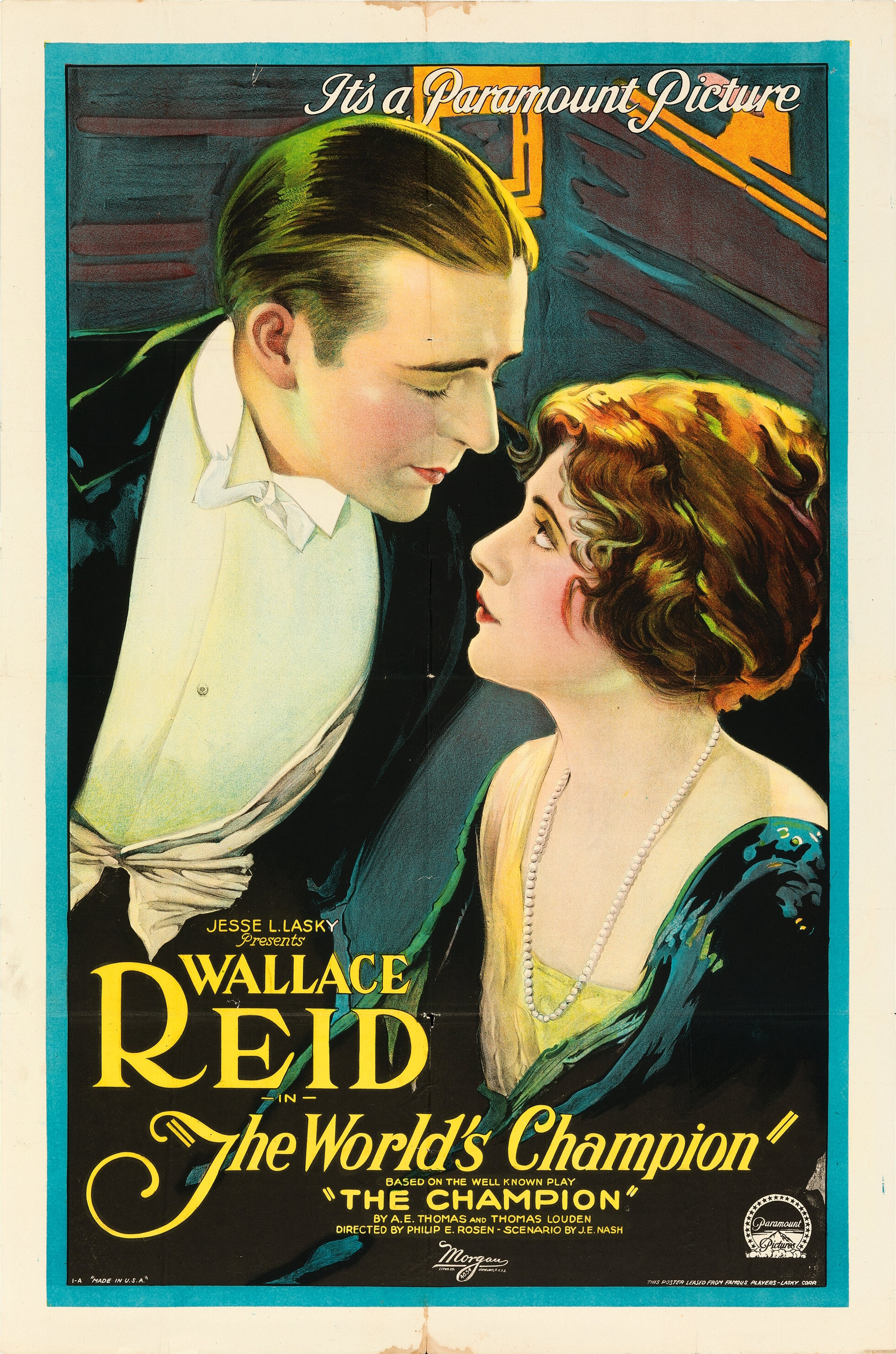
- Theatrical release one-sheet poster
- Directed by: Phil Rosen
- Based on: The Champion by Thomas Louden and A.E. Thomas
- Produced by: Adolph Zukor; Jesse Lasky
- Starring: Wallace Reid; Lois Wilson
- Cinematography: Charles Schoenbaum (aka C. Edgar Schoenbaum)
- Production company: Famous Players-Lasky Corporation
- Distributed by: Paramount Pictures
- Release date: February 25, 1922
- Running time: 5 reels; 5,030 feet
- Country: United States
- Language: Silent (English intertitles)

The World's Champion is a 1922 American silent drama film produced by Famous Players–Lasky and distributed by Paramount Pictures. The movie is based on the play The Champion by Thomas Louden and A.E. Thomas that was produced on Broadway in 1921. The film was directed by Phil Rosen and starred Wallace Reid.

== Plot ==
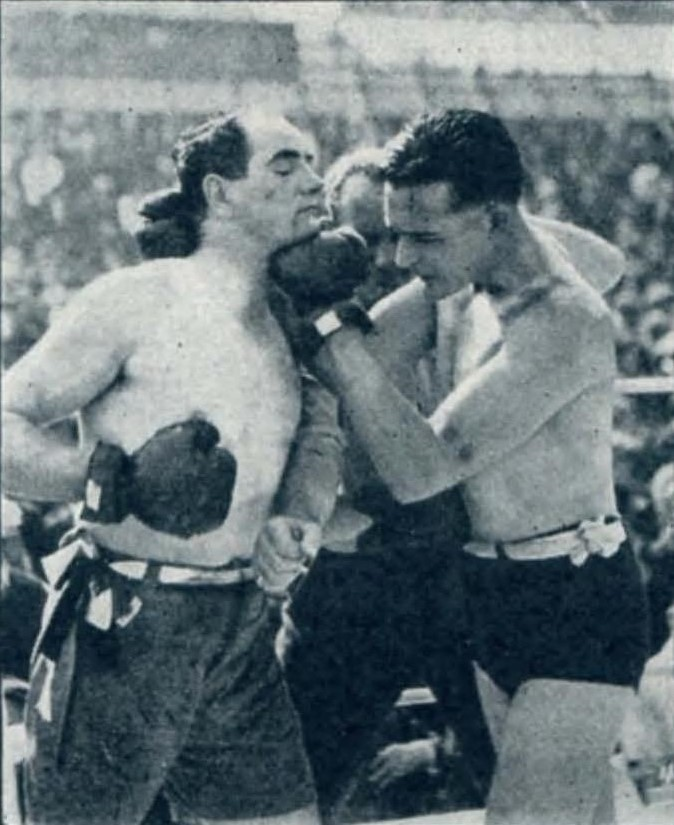
Film still with Wallace Reid and boxer Kid McCoy

As described in a film magazine, William Burroughs is the youngest son of an ambitious middle class English grocer trying to climb to a higher social plane. His two brothers are chips off the old block, but William has always been a thorn in his father's side.

The story opens with William fighting on the estate of Lord Brockington, a portly member of the aristocracy. The Lord's pretty cousin Lady Elizabeth gets her fishing line entangled with that of the grocer's son, and they are making fast headway towards friendship when Brockington discovers them. Having an eye on Lady Elizabeth for himself, the Lord orders William off his land, treating him rough to the extent of knocking him down several times before Lady Elizabeth returns to object. William escorts Lady Elizabeth home, much to the anger of the Lord. William later bids the young woman goodbye, asking her not to marry until he returns with the fortune he is determined to win. William does a Romeo act, which provides situations for good comedy.

William smuggles himself on a liner bound for the United States, and meets an Irish pugilist who teaches him during the way across the gentle art of knocking a man out cold. Five years elapse and William returns to his home as "Gunboat" Williams, middleweight champion of the world. This is the final and most awful disgrace in the eyes of his social climbing father, and he orders William away. Just as William is about to leave, the home is besieged by the mayor backed a bunch of haughty earls and lords, who want to know why the grocer is keeping secret the fact that he raised the middleweight champion. Now the father discovers a great pride in saying "my son."

Lady Elizabeth is acting as the social secretary for the father and, when Lord Brockington comes to take her away, William sees his chance to get even. The fight occurs outside of the home, and William returns the victor in the battle and of the affections of Lady Elizabeth.

== Cast ==
- Wallace Reid as William Burroughs
- Lois Wilson as Lady Elizabeth
- Lionel Belmore as John Burroughs
- Henry Miller, Jr. as George Burroughs
- Helen Dunbar as Mrs. Burroughs
- Leslie Casey as Reverend David Burroughs
- Tiny Sandford as Lord Brockington (credited as Stanley J. Sandford)
- William J. Ferguson as Butler (credited as W.J. Ferguson)
- Guy Oliver as Mooney
- Norman Selby (Kid McCoy)

== Preservation ==
This film survives in an incomplete form with three of five reels existing at the Library of Congress.

== See also ==
- List of boxing films
- Wallace Reid filmography
