= Danny Needham =

American boxer (1867–1922)

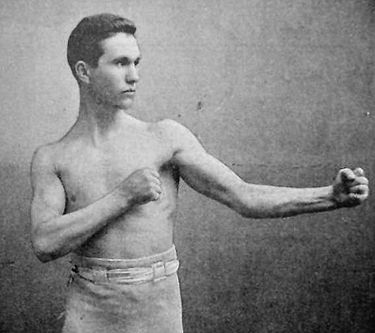

Personal information
- Nickname: The Saint Paul Terror
- Born: John Daniel Needham; May 20, 1867 St. Paul, Minnesota, US
- Died: September 12, 1922 (aged 55) St. Paul, Minnesota, S
- Height: 174 cm (5 ft 9 in)
- Weight: Lightweight; Welterweight

Boxing career
- Stance: Orthodox

Boxing record
- Total fights: 84
- Wins: 66
- Win by KO: 53
- Losses: 11
- Draws: 5
- No contests: 2

John Daniel Needham (May 20, 1867 – September 12, 1922) was an American boxer. Of Irish descent, he was based in St. Paul and started his pro boxing career by challenging lightweight bare-knuckle champion Tommy Danforth to a fight. The fight agreement stipulated that Needham needed to knock his opponent out to win the fight, so the fight was awarded to Danforth even though Needham was better than him through 8 rounds. Needham would become the lightweight champion of the Northwest in 1888 and he would controversially lose a bout for the lightweight championship of America. Around 1889, he made the jump to welterweight. One of his first fights in his new weight class is one of the longest boxing matches ever recorded, a 100 round fight against Patsy Kerrigan. The fight was declared a draw, with both men being in the brink of death. The following year, Needham would challenge Tommy Ryan for the welterweight world title. But he would end up losing after 76 rounds, in another one of the sport's longest matches. Needham moved to Alaska during the Klondike gold rush. He spent the final years of his life in the St. Peter State Hospital, before dying of throat cancer in 1922. He was inducted to the Minnesota Boxing Hall of Fame in 2013.
