= Dark Corner, New South Wales =

Dark Corner
- Village
- Sunny Corner in Australia Map
- Coordinates: 33°22′57″S 149°53′02″E
- Country: Australia
- State: New South Wales

Population (2016 census)
  - Total: 17

Dark Corner is a locality in the central west of New South Wales, Australia and former mining area located between Lithgow and Bathurst just north of the Great Western Highway (Route 32). In the 2016 census, it recorded a population of 17 people.

The area was originally called Mitchell or Mitchell's Creek.

== History ==
The original inhabitants of the area were Aboriginal people, from the Wiradjuri tribe. Although by the time written records of the area were created there were no Aboriginal people living there, Powys notes some archaeological evidence of their occupation in the form of stone axes.

The nearby town of Sunny Corner, New South Wales grew up following the discovery of silver lodes in the area in 1884. This prompted a "rush" to the area, which had previously not been settled. Today the main industry of the area is pastoralism and Pine forestry.

It is within City of Lithgow Council Area.
