= Luther McCarty =

American boxer (1892–1913)

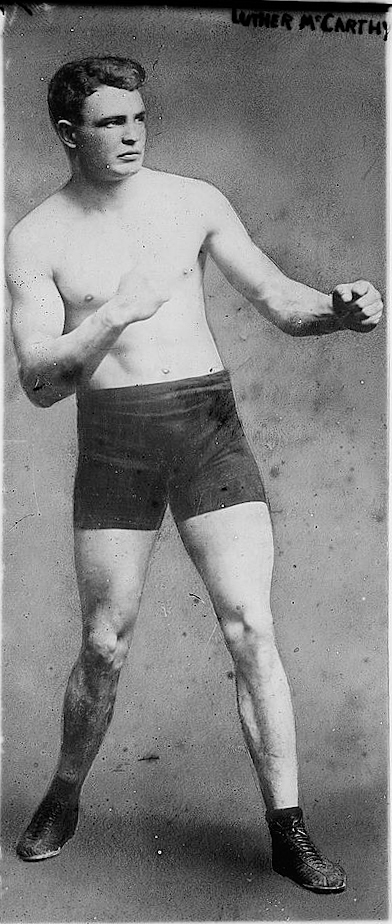
- Luther McCarty in ca. 1910

Personal information
- Nicknames: Luck; The Cowboy; Big Brutus; The Fighting Cowboy; The Fightin' Cowboy of Wild Horse Canyon"
- Born: Luther Quinter McCarty; March 17, 1892 Driftwood Creek, Nebraska, (Note: Some sources say McCarty hailed from Driftwood Creel, some sources say Sidney, Ohio, Lincoln, Nebraska, a ranch near McCook, or in a hollow somewhere in Hitchcock County.) U.S.
- Died: May 24, 1913 (aged 21) Calgary, Alberta, Canada
- Height: 6 ft 4 in (193 cm) (Note: The height of McCarty was said to be 6 ft 3 in, according to The Tacoma Times on January 1, 1913, in an article regarding the Palzer fight, although BoxRec hasn't published the finding as of March 19, 2020.)
- Weight: Heavyweight

Boxing career
- Reach: 80 in (203 cm) (Note: The reach of McCarty was said to be 75.5 in, according to The Tacoma Times on January 01, 1913, in an article regarding the Palzer fight, although BoxRec hasn't published the finding as of March 19, 2020.)

Boxing record
- Total fights: 25
- Wins: 19
- Win by KO: 15
- Losses: 4
- Draws: 2

Luther Quinter McCarty (March 17, 1892 – May 24, 1913) was an American professional boxer who competed from 1911 to 1913. He was considered by most to be the greatest of all the "Great White Hope" fighters who fought during the time of Jack Johnson. He claimed the Heavyweight Championship during Jack Johnson's troubles with the United States Government, with many boxing historians rating him the man with the best chance of defeating Johnson. McCarty was ranked #10 on The Ring magazine's list of the best American heavyweights of the 1910s.

McCarty, solidly built and agile, stood about 6'4", and used his 80" reach to throw his strong left jab to both his opponent's head and body with equal accuracy. Though he was at his best controlling the action from a distance, he also possessed a powerful right hand, a devastating left hook to the body, and a punishing uppercut - called Betsy - that he would use when his opponents tried to fight him in close. In addition to his physical strengths, McCarty also had a cool fighting style, never appearing in the ring too nervous or affected by his opponents.

== Early life ==
Luther Quinter McCarty was born on 20 March 1892 to Maggie McCarty (née Scott), a native of Ireland, and Anton P. McCarty, a cure-all elixirs salesman and proprietor of the White Eagle Medicine Company. Depending on the source, he was born on a farm 30 miles southwest of Lincoln, Nebraska, on a ranch near McCook, Driftwood Creek, Wild Horse Canyon, or in a hollow somewhere in Hitchcock County. His mother was reported to be a stout six feet and 200 pounds, whilst his father stood six feet, five inches tall at 315 pounds. In 1893, Mrs. McCarty died, giving birth to a stillborn son, and as there was no woman in the home, both Luther and young-sister Hazel were taken in by two of McCarty's good neighbours, Mr. and Mrs. John Houlahan, while Anton worked away in his fields of broom corn. He grew up in Piqua, Ohio, and spent time at Sidney gym, as he resided in Sidney since 1907. By 1910, eighteen-year-old Luther decided to go west to lead his life as a cowboy, and found work on a farm in Montana, as an itinerant farmhand, breaking horses. In 1910, he – along with friend Lefty Williams – paid 50 cents to join O'Leary's Athletic Club gymnasium.

== Professional boxing career ==
=== Early career ===
During the first winter in Montana he began boxing with some of the locals, and soon caught the eye of the local fight promoters. He was a substitute for Yank Kenny, who left town the day before the fight, and on January 7, 1911, in his first recorded fight, he knocked out Wat Adams in the second round, and after had had several bouts in Montana, North Dakota, and Canada, fighting seven times, winning seven fights, by stoppage. Of these such bouts included legendary iron-chinned Joe Grim, earning a draw spending his energy in trying to knockout the "toughest man on earth". He had worked as a sparring partner in Culbertson, Montana, in the fall of 1911. And additionally, on December 6, 1911, McCarty fought Joe Cox (6-1, 4 KOs), and stopped him in the sixth-round by way of an uppercut.

On December 18, 1911, Fury fought 25-year-old contender Jeff Clark (60–5–8, 30 KOs) in a non-title bout in Springfield, Missouri. With the exception of the first and second rounds, which were rushed by McCarty, Clark was easily in the lead. The fourth and fifth rounds were evenly contested, but in the third round Clark hooked a left to McCarty's chin, which floored him, though McCarty was up at the count of four. Through the sixth, seventh, eighth, ninth and tenth rounds, McCarty was outclassed and ultimately lost a points-decision. After defeating McCarty, Clark was said to be matched to fight Harry Wuest on December 28, 1911, followed by that of Joe Jeanette at Memphis in January 1912. After his defeat by Clark, less than two-weeks after, McCarty faced Harry Wuest, in which he followed another loss in the form of a newspaper decision. Following his defeat to Wuest, McCarty returned to achieve five consecutive knockouts in his defeats of Jim Harper, Bill Schultz, and Joe Hagan. McCarty returned to the ring on May 3, 1912, at the Springfield Athletic Club, Springfield, Missouri against Carl Morris (13–2–0, 9 KOs), to which McCarty caught him with a clean right-uppercut to the jaw which sent Morris down in the sixth-round. There was some confusion over how long Morris was down after being put there by McCarty. Morris claimed he was only down six seconds while referee Edward W Cochrane, who was not allowed to utter an audible count by local police, claimed Morris was down fourteen seconds, in which most of the ringside agreed with. The fifth consecutive knockout came in the form of his defeat of Jack Reed on May 23, 1912.

=== Rise through the ranks ===
On August 5, 1912, McCarty lost the fight via newspaper decision to experienced Jim Stewart. In the fourth, Stewart landed his right on McCarty's jaw with all his might, resulting in his opponent dropping his hands and grinning. McCarty started off with a rush, taking Stewart by surprise and slamming him back against the ropes with a volley of left and right swings and straight punches. Stewart stopped almost everything. McCarty started with a left jab to the face. In the ninth round, McCarty nearly floundered to the floor from weariness when Stewart made him miss. On August 6, 1912, The New York Times wrote that "McCarty did his best work with a left hook. He showed plenty of punching power with this hand. And occasionally he jarred Stewart with his right, but his work with this hand was crude. He was continually trying for Stewart's stomach, but he seemed unable to land in a manner which carried any speed behind the blow. He rushed continually, with his arms extended at full length, and wasted the power which the blow would have carried had he stood still and snapped his punches."

Following his loss to Stewart, McCarty began his journey towards the top of the heavyweight division by facing future lineal champion Jess Willard (10–2–0, 7 KOs) at Madison Square Garden on August 19, 1912. At the weigh-in, Luther, 20 at the time of the fight, weighed in at 203 and a one-quarter pounds, one of the heaviest he had weighed professionally; Willard, 30, came in heavier at 224 pounds. On August 20, 1912, The New York Times wrote: "Willard's great height and reach had McCarty baffled in the first two rounds, but in the next two the Westerner tore in at a clip that gave promise of an easy victory, if not a knockout. Willard came back strong, however, in the later rounds of the bout, drove McCarty back with his accurate left jabs, shook McCarty from head to toes with terrific right uppercuts, and had him bleeding from the mouth, nose and forehead. Both of McCarty's eyes were swollen when he left the right, and Willard carried a large bruise on his left cheek." The fight was granted a draw from The New York Sun, Chicago Tribune, The Boston Daily Globe, whilst being granted a newspaper decision for Willard from The New York Times. Willard was given the verdict almost unanimously by the New York papers, and it was said in reports of the contest that McCarty was hardly able to land one telling blow on him. Undeterred by his previous two results, McCarty fought and beat Jim Barry, Jack McFarland and Al Kaufman, by way of knockout.

On December 10, 1912, McCarty fought against Fireman Jim Flynn (60–16–20, 40 KOs) in Vernon, California, with the winner to face Al Palzer on January 1, 1913, for the heavyweight championship of the world. McCarty weighed 205 pounds, marginally higher than his previous fights, with Flynn coming in at 190 pounds. Flynn entered with a record of 10–1–0–1 in his previous twelve bouts. McCarty improved his record to 16–2–3 with 14 stoppage wins, with a sixteenth-round technical knockout over Flynn. Flynn was an easy target for McCarty's best blows, including a left jab and a right-cross. Although Flynn was outclassed from the first round, he was first in trouble in the eighth-round when a short right sent him to the map for the count. Twice more before the end of the round Flynn went down, once rolling over on the floor three times before rising to his knee, where he crouched with blood pouring in a stream from his mouth and face, while Eyton tolled the seconds. Both of Flynn's eyes were closed, his right ear was pounded to a grisly pulp, his noise broken and his lips driven to shreds between his teeth, resulting in referee Charles Eyton heeding the demands of the howling crowd to stop the fight. After the fight, Flynn remarked: "Jim Corbett said in a mouthful after his second fight with Jeffries - 'he was too damned big.' That goes for me here. I never new they made men so game."

=== World White heavyweight champion ===
==== McCarty vs. Palzer ====
On December 10, 1912, after McCarty's stoppage of Flynn, it was announced that McCarty would face White heavyweight champion Al Palzer (8–3–0–1, 5 KOs) on January 1, 1912. In January 1912, Jack Johnson had begun active training again with the idea of getting back into the game, with Johnson remarking: "As far as McCarty and Palzer fighting for the championship — it is absurd. McCarty may be a wonderful boxer, but I will bet $10,000 that I can beat McCarty, Palzer and Willard in the same ring and take on one 15 minutes after defeating the other [...] When I fought Jeffries I told the public just how the bout would come out [...] I hope that the American public will forget some of the things that have been said about Johnson and let some of the 'black hopes' and 'white hopes' meet Johnson and fight it out and let the best man win."

At the official weigh-in, before the fight, Palzer tipped the scales at 218 pounds, while McCarty weighed 205 pounds. Prior to the fight, Palzer remarked: "I'll win any time between the first and the tenth. If the one good old punch doesn't do the work early in the fight I'll wear him down long before the limit. McCarty can't stand my pace. I'm in good shape and never was so confident in my life." However, McCarty stated: "I expect to be a world's champion tonight. I never saw Palzer box, but I'm willing to take anything he can send to give one back. I just ask no quarter. Just let us get together and let the better man go out of the ring with the belt around his waist. I won't be surprised if I land the knockout within two rounds, but I'm ready for whatever comes." Through seventeen rounds and into the eighteenth, McCarty out boxed, out-generaled and out-punched Palzer, and in the eighteenth had Palzer wobbling sadly, his knees shaking under the great strain of the body they no longer were able to support steadily. A succession of lefts and rights to the head, which rocked Palzer to the bottom of his immense frame and caused blood to stream from cuts on his eyes and lips. As the bell signalled the start of the eighteenth-round, McCarty stung Palzer with a left to the jaw, followed by a right to his head. Palzer reeled away, wobbly and shaken. McCarty stalked him for the kill, and referee Eyton knifed in between the two, raised his hands, and the bout was over. Upon his defeat of Palzer, he was given a diamond-studded belt, valued at five thousand dollars, and was the recognised white heavyweight champion of the world. After the events of the Palzer fight, Jack Johnson (54–10–10–3, 25 KOs) set side the tradition that required the champions to wait for others to challenge them, and called on McCarty to face him for the lineal championship. Speaking after the fight, McCarty said: "When I accepted the heavy-weight championship belt, I agreed to an unwritten clause that I should never fight a negro [...] Well, I'm going to live up to my contract.", and that he would not fight Johnson "under any circumstances.”"

==== McCarty vs. Pelkey ====
On April 26, soon after his win over Palzer, McCarty again beat Flynn, this time more decisively, with McCarty leading throughout the fight and frequently compelled his opponent to clinch to avoid his vicious straight left jabs. Although he appeared to be outclassed from the start, Flynn, rushed into clinch after clinch and succeeded in landing many blows on the champion at close quarters. McCarty, however seemed to be in the pink of condition and was not affected by Flynn's hooks [...] With straight jabs he pounded away at his opponent's face. At the end of the first round Flynn's nose was bleeding, in the second round his mouth was cut and before the close of the bout one eye was nearly closed. He followed his win over Flynn with a ten-round, no-decision bout with Frank Moran in New York. Moran was considered to be a trial-horse, but he gave McCarty a tough fight, and demonstrated that McCarty lacked a true knockout punch. Nevertheless, McCarty survived the ten-round battle and won a newspaper decision according to The New York Times. Another three-round exhibition with an unknown, Fred Fulton, occurred on May 15.

Less than a month after beating Moran, McCarty traveled to Calgary, Alberta, to take a "stay busy" fight with Canadian heavyweight Arthur Pelkey while he waited to fight another top contender or perhaps Jack Johnson himself. McCarty smiled as he entered the ring on May 24, 1913, while Pelkey looked grim and determined. During the first round of a fight billed as the World White Heavyweight Championship held on May 24, 1913, a few blows were thrown, but nothing of consequence. According to The New York Times, McCarty lashed out with left jabs and found Pelkey's face, leaving a reddened countenance, with Pelkey rushing in and scoring with an uppercut. McCarty's head shook and his neck muscles bulged. From his face went the smile he had carried only moments before. From the corner, Billy McCarney, McCarty's manager, screamed to his fighter: "Move! Move! Keep moving and stick out your left!" McCarty, in a daze, on uncooperative legs, did not heed the advice. He stumbled around the ring, his face bloodless, and he took another left-right combination to the jaw. McCarty smiled, and turned slightly and fell flat on his back in the ring, with the cheers of the crowd quickly turned silent as McCarty did not move. A chance blow just below the heart of McCarthy after one minute and forty-five seconds of fighting caused his death. The blow struck McCarthy just below the heart, sending him reeling, to which he fell heavily to the floor. The referee began the count and eventually McCarty was hauled to his corner, and as his faction attempted to revive him: Luther McCarty was dead.

McCarty's death was front-page news around the world, as it was the first time in history that a champion had been killed in the ring, while also being the first time any boxer had been killed in the ring in Canada. Everyone connected with the fight suffered, with Billy McCarney, and the referee, Ed W. Smith, the Chicago Evening American sports editor, were arrested. Tommy Burns, the promoter, was indicted for manslaughter. Arsonists burned down Tommy Burns's Arena, and boxing was banned in Alberta. On learning of McCarty's death, "Pelkey broke down and cried like a child all the way to the police barracks. "I killed a man, I killed a man" were the only words that passed his lips for over an hour. Pelkey was arrested by the North-West Mounted Police and charged with manslaughter, and although he was absolved from blame by the Coroner's report, the shock of having killed McCarty in the ring ruined Pelkey. He had become an uncomfortable man to have around, and was remembered in boxing history as the man who killed Luther McCarty. On June 4, 1913, according to the Windsor Star, Pelkey was described as a broken man, with his nerves being torn to shreds by the events of the few preceding days: "He may never fight again, but if he does, there appears to be every possibility that the recollection of the one blow to McCarthy's chin will make him an easy mark for opponents." The Star added that Pelkey declared that he was unsure what he would do, though he stated he wished to defend his title, but whether he would be able to or not was a matter for the future to decide.

Offers by theatrical promoters flooded in to put Pelkey on stage, no doubt in re-creation exhibitions of this bout, all of which he seems to have refused. Reportedly Pelkey did not want to fight again, but was forced into it because of legal fees incurred to defend himself in the aftermath of the tragedy. Pelkey had lost his first four bouts when returning to the ring after McCarty's death, and lost his title to Jack Johnson's sparring partner, Gunboat Smith. He could no longer defend himself in the ring, losing almost every bout after the McCarty fight, usually getting knocked out after a beating. Pelkey finally settled in Ford City, Ontario to become a police officer and city councilman, and seemed to have recovered a semblance of redemption before contracting a sleeping sickness that was sweeping Canada and died at the age of 36, having secured a draw against Young Peter Jackson three months prior.

== Personal life ==
McCarty, aged sixteen, was married in Sidney, Ohio of May 28, 1907, to nineteen-year-old Rhoda Wright, the daughter of Amanda (née Stumpff) and Theodore Wright, a prosperous farmer. On February 14, 1911, the couple had a daughter, Cornelia Alberta. His cousins Tom and Joe McCarty were fellow professional boxers in the heavyweight division. On March 8, 1913, he was among some of the top personalities in boxing who paid their respects at the grave of middleweight Stanley Ketchel at Holy Cross Cemetery in Grand Rapids, Michigan.

== Death ==
The exact cause has never been fully determined. It was at first believed that heart failure was the cause, but this was later doubted by physicians, who found that a dislocation of a vertebra in his neck had taken place, and it was the accepted theory by most that this injury had been caused a few days previous when the champion was riding a bucking mustang and that Pelkey's blow caused a further dislocation, resulting in McCarty's death. On May 25, 1913, The Salt Lake Tribune published that physicians at the ringside stated that death was due to heart trouble. Several medical men clambered through the ropes and did all in their power to resuscitate the unconscious McCarty. The doctors stated that McCarty had valvular heart trouble and that this had been aggravated by the excitement. After the physicians had been working over him for about ten-minutes, Dr. Aull, one of the physicians who attended McCarty, stated that McCarty was breathing naturally and would soon come around. A hypodermic was injected, but it failed to have any effect and it was then that McCarty was removed to the open air. Billy McCarney, manager of McCarty, stated that Luther had had stomach trouble for a week previous to the bout, in which stomach tablets were taken and he was compelled to lay off from heavy training for two days last week. McCarney stated that thirty seconds before the fall, McCarty struck a crouching position, such as he used in delivering an uppercut and had winked at McCarty in his corner. Dr. Aull declared after the death of the champion that he had kept close track of all the blows struck and that not one below of enough power to do any damage had been landed and that Pelkey was not in any way responsible for the death of McCarthy. All physicians unite in declaring death was due to heart trouble and not to any blow, although admitting that Pelkey's thrust to the heart capped the climax, as the heart was then almost bursting with blood caused by the excitement. On May 27, 1913, The New York Times the coroner's jury exonerated Pelkey, with H. S. Mosher performing the autopsy on McCarty's body. He revealed that death was caused by a spinal haemorrhage, the result of a dislocation of the neck. Mosher remarked that the fall could not have produced that result, and found heart conditions such as to entirely preclude the supposition that death came from a blow over the heart. Burns, McCarney, and SMith were unable to account for the way in which McCarty received his fatal injuries, in which they said the blows exchanged a force insufficient to have scored a knockdown. McCarney stated that eight-ounce gloves were used and the men obeyed the rules not to hold or hit in clinches, with him asserting on the witness stand that McCarty was in good condition when he entered the ring.

Once McCarty's body arrived in Ohio, his casket was set up at the Wagner, Grover and Company furniture store and more than 7,500 people filed past it in one night and the following morning. The casket was then paraded through town in a hearse drawn by the two white Arabian horses that his father used to pull his medicine show wagon. Newspaper representatives from big dailies throughout the country were there covering the funeral, as well as magazine writers of national reputation. Some 2,500 people joined the funeral procession to Forest Hill Cemetery, in Piqua, Ohio, where McCarty is buried. The Dayton Daily News reported that "...several thousand persons looked upon the face of the dead fighter as his body lay in state." Among the mourners were Luther's estranged wife, Rhoda, and Cornelia, his daughter, whom had travelled from their home in Fargo, North Dakota. McCarty's grave – in a plot that now includes his father, his stepmother, Caroline, and his older sister Elleta – has a front stone bearing the appropriately chiselled text: "The Champion Rests.", with the head of his grave reading: "He Knew No Wrong".

=== Legacy ===
Today, the legacy of McCarty is widely forgotten. However, he was once considered one of the top Heavyweight prospects during the 1910s by fellow boxers and boxing experts:

- Nat Fleischer, founder of The Ring magazine, and Sam Andre in A Pictorial History of Boxing (1959) wrote of the effort to dethrone Jack Johnson as Heavyweight Champion and named some splendid fighters, to which they furthered: "The 'White Hopes' thrived between 1910 and 1915, and they were a mighty impressive lot, far better than the majority of the contenders in recent years. For a time it seemed that Frank Moran might be the successful candidate, and then the eyes of the boxing world became centred on a better all-around heavyweight, Luther McCarty."
- DeWitt Van Court, boxing instructor of James J. Jeffries, asserted that McCarty was "[...] unquestionably the greatest young heavyweight prospect since the days of John L. Sullivan. McCarty had a huge frame, standing six feet four inches tall and having a reach of eighty-one inches. He weighed 205 pounds and stripped in the finest of condition and had really only begun to fill out at the time he died."
- Dan Cuoco, boxing historian and director of the International Boxing Research Organization stated, "Luther McCarty was big and strong and considered by most boxing experts as the best of the 'White Hopes."
- Billy McCarney, promoter of McCarty, elected McCarty as the greatest heavyweight ever. He anticipated that people would think sentiment caused him to choose McCartysince he developed and managed him but gave his reasons as follows. "[McCarty] was a natural born fighter. He had only two years of ring experience. Never had seen a boxing bout until he was forced in as a substitute at a show he attended with some cowboy friends [...] He was a combination of speed, cleverness, gameness and hitting ability. Immune to punishment, loving the lust of battle, gifted with every physical requirement - Luther McCarty was the world's greatest heavyweight".
- John Lardner, American sports writer, conceded that McCarty "may well have been the best fighter of all the white hopes." He quotes Fleischer as saying, "There is little doubt that had McCarty lived he would have won the title [...] McCarty ... was not as big as Willard, but he was quite large ... and fast for his size."

== Professional boxing record ==
25 fights	19 wins	4 losses
By knockout	15	1
By decision	4	3
By disqualification	0	0
Draws	2	

No.	Result	Record	Opponent	Type	Round, time	Date	Location	Notes
25	Loss	19–4–2	(Canada) Arthur Pelkey	KO	1 (10)	24 May 1913	Tommy Burns's Arena, Calgary, Alberta, Canada	Lost World White heavyweight title
24	Win	19–3–2	(United States) Frank Moran	NWS	10	30 Apr 1913	(United States) St. Nicholas Arena, New York City, New York, U.S.	
23	Win	18–3–2	(United States) Fireman Jim Flynn	NWS	6	16 Apr 1913	(United States) Olympia Athletic Club, Philadelphia, Pennsylvania, U.S.	
22	Win	17–3–2	(United States) Al Palzer	TKO	18 (20)	1 Jan 1913	(United States) Vernon Arena, Vernon, California, U.S. (Note: The location of the McCarty and Palzer fight was said to be at the Vernon Arena, which was confirmed by The Tacoma Times on January 01, 1913 in an article, although BoxRec hasn't published the finding as of March 19, 2020.)	Won World White heavyweight title
21	Win	16–3–2	(United States) Fireman Jim Flynn	TKO	16 (20)	10 Dec 1912	(United States) Vernon, California, U.S.	
20	Win	15–3–2	(United States) Al Kaufman	TKO	2 (20), 2:12	12 Oct 1912	(United States) Eighth Street Arena, San Francisco, California, U.S.	
19	Win	14–3–2	(United States) Jack McFarland	KO	2 (6)	28 Sep 1912	(United States) Old City Hall, Pittsburgh, Pennsylvania, U.S.	
18	Win	13–3–2	(United States) Jim Barry	NWS	6	14 Sep 1912	(United States) Old City Hall, Pittsburgh, Pennsylvania, U.S.	
17	Draw	12–3–2	(United States) Jess Willard	NWS	10	19 Aug 1912	(United States) Madison Square Garden, New York City, New York, U.S.	
16	Loss	12–3–1	(United States) Jim Stewart	NWS	10	5 Aug 1912	(United States) Madison Square Garden, New York City, New York, U.S.	
15	Win	12–2–1	(United States) Tim Logan	NWS	6	19 Jun 1912	(United States) National Athletic Club, Philadelphia, Pennsylvania, U.S.	
14	Win	11–2–1	(United States) Jack Reed	KO	3	23 May 1912	(United States) Joplin, Missouri, U.S.	
13	Win	10–2–1	(United States) Carl Morris	KO	6 (10)	3 May 1912	(United States) Springfield Athletic Club, Springfield, Missouri, U.S.	
12	Win	9–2–1	(United States) Joe Hagan	KO	3	26 Apr 1912	(United States) Bartlesville, Oklahoma, U.S.	
11	Win	8–2–1	(United States) Bill Schultz	KO	1 (10)	1 Apr 1912	(United States) Springfield, Missouri, U.S.	
10	Win	7–2–1	(United States) Jim Harper	KO	1 (10), 0:30	19 Mar 1912	(United States) Springfield Athletic Club, Springfield, Missouri, U.S.	
9	Loss	6–2–1	(United States) Harry Wuest	NWS	10	28 Dec 1911	(United States) Springfield, Missouri, U.S.	
8	Loss	6–1–1	(United States) Jeff Clark	NWS	10	18 Dec 1911	(United States) Springfield Athletic Club, Springfield, Missouri, U.S. (Note: The location of the McCarty and Clark fight was said to be Springfield Athletic Club, which was confirmed by The San Francisco Call on December 19, 1911 in an article, although BoxRec hasn't published the finding as of March 16, 2020.)	
7	Win	6–0-1	(United States) Joe Cox	KO	6	6 Dec 1911	(United States) Landers Theater, Springfield, Missouri, U.S.	
6	Win	5–0-1	(United States) Jack Heinen	KO	3	30 Nov 1911	(United States) South Bend, Indiana, U.S.	
5	Win	4–0-1	(United States) Tommy Crawford	KO	1	7 Oct 1911	(United States) Fargo, North Dakota, U.S.	
4	Win	3–0-1	(Mexico) Al Withers	KO	8	4 Jul 1911	(United States) Fargo, North Dakota, U.S.	
3	Win	2–0-1	(Mexico) Al Withers	KO	13	9 Jun 1911	(United States) Fargo, North Dakota, U.S.	
2	Draw	1–0-1	(United States) Joe Grim	TD	8 (10)	14 Apr 1911	Fairmount Club, Calgary, Alberta, Canada	
1	Win	1–0	(Canada) Wat Adams	KO	2	7 Jan 1911	(United States) Culbertson, Montana, U.S.	

== Notes ==
Titles in pretence
Preceded by Al Palzer	World White Heavyweight Champion; January 1, 1913 - May 24, 1913	Succeeded by Arthur Pelkey
