= Fireman Jim Flynn =

American boxer

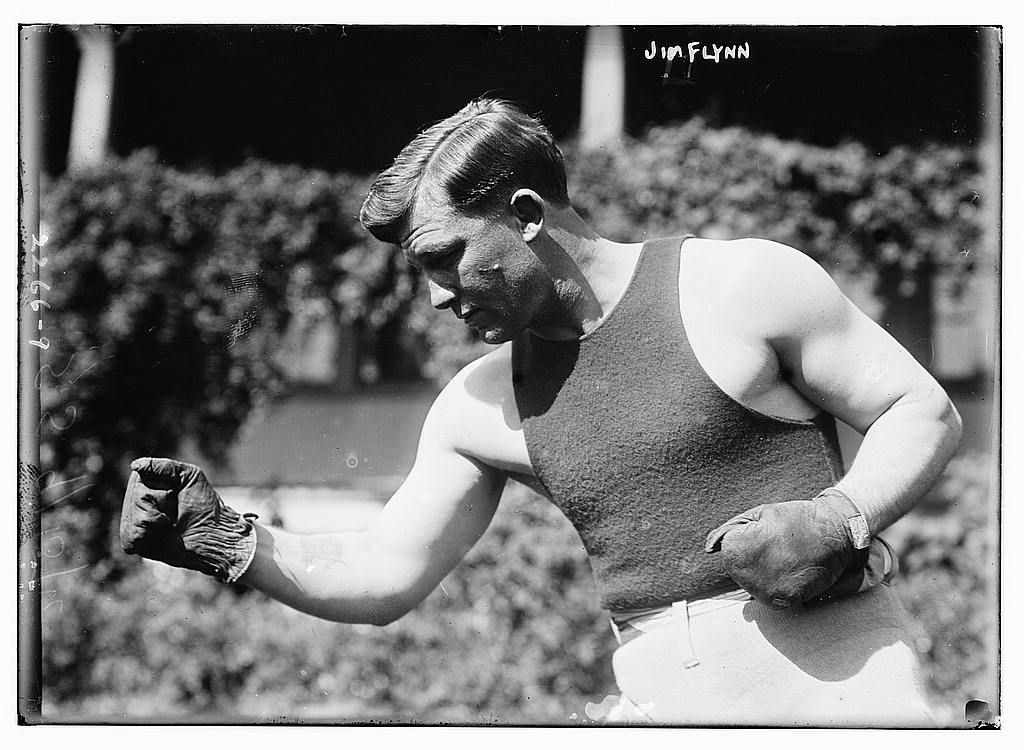

Personal information
- Nickname: Andrew Haynes
- Nationality: American
- Born: Andrew Chiariglione; 24 December 1879 Hoboken, New Jersey, U.S.
- Died: 12 April 1935 (aged 55) Los Angeles, California, U.S.
- Height: 5 ft 9 1/2 in (1.77 m)
- Weight: Heavyweight

Boxing career
- Stance: Orthodox

Boxing record
- Total fights: 170; with the inclusion of newspaper decisions
- Wins: 81
- Win by KO: 56
- Losses: 61
- Draws: 26
- No contests: 2

Andrew Chiariglione (24 December 1879 – 12 April 1935), usually known as Fireman Jim Flynn, was an American boxer of the early twentieth century who twice attempted to take the World Heavyweight Title without success. He is often remembered as the only boxer ever to knock out the formidable Jack Dempsey.

== Professional career ==
A native of Hoboken, New Jersey, Flynn's first recorded fight was in 1899. He started his career in 1900, he was working as a railroad fireman in Pueblo, Colorado at the time.

Flynn was short for a light heavyweight, but sturdy, tough, and clever. He faced many notable boxers of his era.

=== First attempt at World Heavyweight Title, October 1906 ===
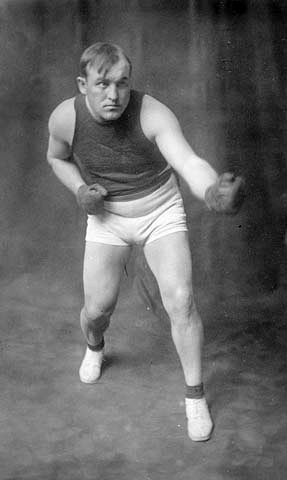
Tommy Burns

He was first offered a shot at the World Heavyweight Title by heavyweight champion Tommy Burns. They met on 2 October 1906 in Los Angeles, California, with Burns stopping Flynn in the 15th round. The fight was an exciting one from the start, and Flynn was nearly down for the count more than once in the fourteenth. In the fifteenth round, Burns knocked Flynn to the canvas in the center of the ring for a full ten minutes before he could be revived. According to the Los Angeles Times, Burns was "given one of the hardest battles of his career", and "up to the fourteenth round Flynn was a strong as Burns". Flynn took terrible punishment in the fourteenth and final fifteenth round, however.

Flynn met Jack "Twin" Sullivan three times in 1906–07, drawing twice, and beating him once on points.

On 14 July 1909, Flynn met future Hall of Fame boxer Billy Papke in a ten-round Draw according to the Los Angeles Herald. The Los Angeles Times, however, gave the bout to Papke, as did the United Press. He had previously defeated Papke by newspaper decision on 19 March of that year in Los Angeles.

Flynn fought the highly rated Sam Langford in 1908 and twice more in 1910, losing twice and gaining a draw in their second match.

=== Second attempt at World Heavyweight Title, July 1912 ===
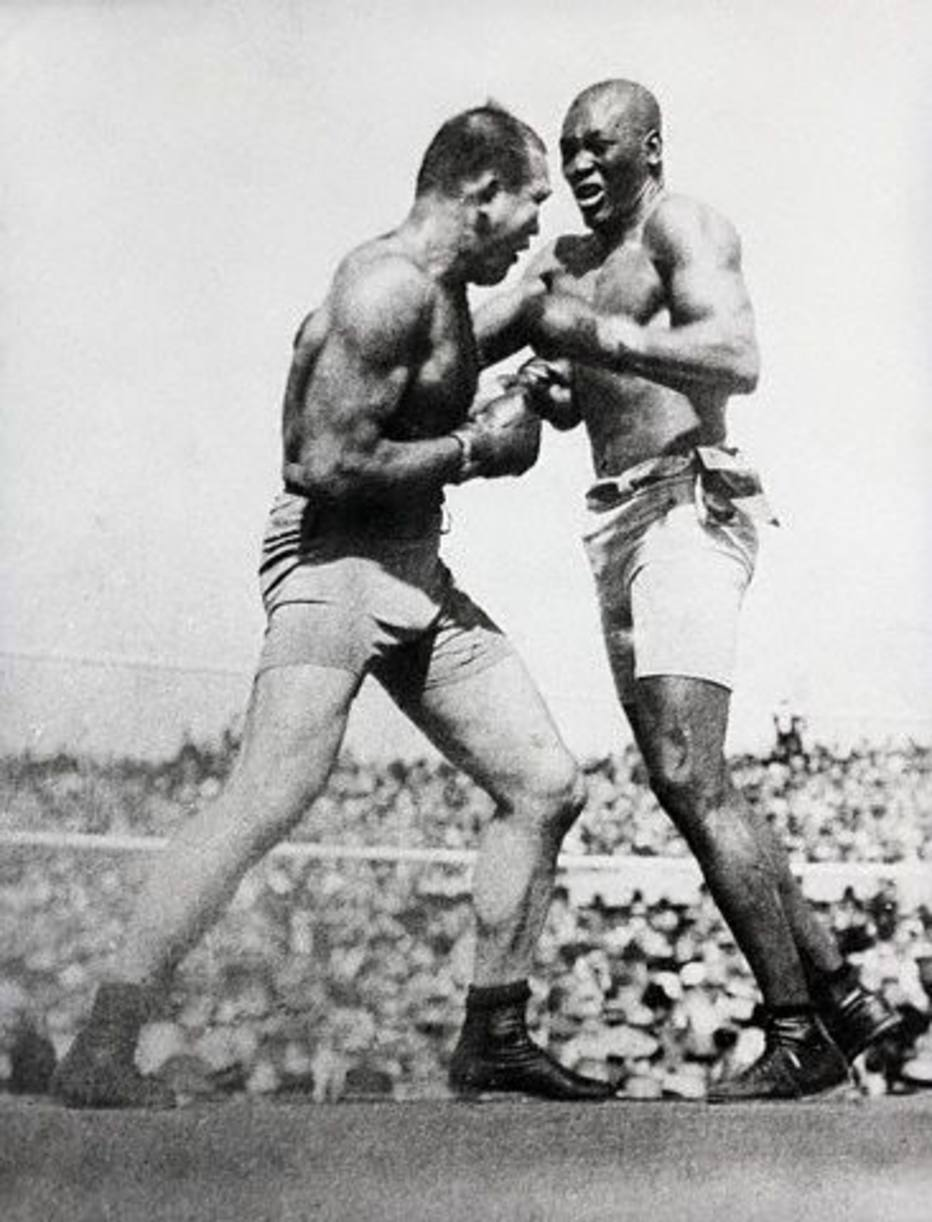
Jack Johnson boxing on right with Jim Jeffries

On 4 July 1912, in one of his most important bouts, Flynn challenged for the World Heavyweight Title a second time against Jack Johnson in Las Vegas, New Mexico. Despite being warned by the referee, Flynn continually attempted to headbutt Johnson, and the local sheriff eventually stepped in during the ninth round to stop the fight in Johnson's favor. Johnson won the fight decisively and was barely touched by the fists of Flynn, who was repeatedly the victim of Johnson's blows.

He continued to fight rated contenders including Battling Levinsky, Jack Dillon and Gunboat Smith.

==== Knockout victory over Jack Dempsey, February 1917 ====
Flynn knocked out Jack Dempsey in a first round win in Murray, Utah, on 13 February 1917. Charging Dempsey from the opening bell, Flynn pushed Dempsey into position with his right, and knocked him out with a left to the chin, twenty-five seconds into the first round. Both boxers may have been distracted by a late start to the fight which began at midnight. Dempsey later denied having thrown the fight and said he lost because he was unable to warm up properly before the match and that he had injured his hand earlier setting pins in a bowling alley. Flynn became the only fighter ever to knock out Dempsey. Although boxing historian Monte Cox and others have questioned the legitimacy of the result claiming a pre-arranged fix, most contemporary historians concede the knockout to Flynn. A year later Flynn met Dempsey again, and this time Dempsey knocked out Flynn in the first round.

Flynn continued to fight into his 40s. He fought three bouts against Sam Langford, losing all three, and beat Tiger Flowers, the future middleweight champion, in 1923. He finally retired in 1925 after a 26-year ring career, with a final record of 76–46–22, including 33 wins by knockout.

He died of a heart attack on 12 April 1935 at the City Hospital in Los Angeles.

== Professional boxing record ==
All information in this section is derived from BoxRec, unless otherwise stated.

=== Official Record ===
170 fights	72 wins	46 losses
By knockout	56	26
By decision	10	16
By disqualification	6	4
Draws	22	
No contests	2	
Newspaper decisions/draws	28	

All newspaper decisions are officially regarded as “no decision” bouts and are not counted in the win/loss/draw column.

No.	Result	Record	Opponent	Type	Round	Date	Age	Location	Notes
170	Loss	72–46–22 (30)	Steve Ramos	TKO	2 (6)	Oct 30, 1925	45 years, 310 days	Capital City Arena, Phoenix, Arizona, U.S.	
169	Loss	72–45–22 (30)	Tony Canales	PTS	3	Sep 8, 1925	45 years, 258 days	El Paso, Texas, U.S.	
168	Loss	72–44–22 (30)	Sergeant Jack Lynch	PTS	10	May 16, 1925	45 years, 143 days	Kelly's Pastime Hall, Winslow, Arizona, U.S.	
167	Loss	72–43–22 (30)	Young Spence	NWS	10	Sep 3, 1924	44 years, 254 days	Soledad Roof, San Antonio, Texas, U.S.	
166	Loss	72–43–22 (29)	Sam Langford	PTS	8	Jan 6, 1924	44 years, 13 days	Ford's Arena, Ciudad Juarez, Chihuahua, Mexico	
165	Loss	72–42–22 (29)	Sam Langford	KO	3 (15)	Oct 19, 1923	43 years, 299 days	Mexico City, Distrito Federal, Mexico	
164	Win	72–41–22 (29)	Tiger Flowers	RTD	5 (?)	Sep 17, 1923	43 years, 267 days	Mexico City, Distrito Federal, Mexico	Flowers unable to continue because of an injured hand
163	Loss	71–41–22 (29)	Andres Balsa	DQ	8 (?)	Aug 5, 1923	43 years, 224 days	Mexico City, Distrito Federal, Mexico	
162	Loss	71–40–22 (29)	Sam Langford	PTS	10	Aug 2, 1923	43 years, 221 days	Mexico City, Distrito Federal, Mexico	
161	Loss	71–39–22 (29)	Sully Montgomery	KO	3 (?)	Jun 2, 1923	43 years, 160 days	Mexico City, Distrito Federal, Mexico	
160	Draw	71–38–22 (29)	Ole Anderson	PTS	10	May 26, 1922	42 years, 153 days	Omaha, Nebraska, U.S.	
159	Loss	71–38–21 (29)	Chief Metoquah	KO	6 (10)	May 3, 1922	42 years, 130 days	Guymon, Oklahoma, U.S.	
158	Win	71–37–21 (29)	Mike Schubert	KO	3 (?)	Apr 17, 1922	42 years, 114 days	Hoisington, Texas, U.S.	
157	Win	70–37–21 (29)	Ben Sheff	KO	2 (?)	Mar 17, 1922	42 years, 83 days	Fort Worth, Texas, U.S.	
156	Draw	69–37–21 (29)	Abe Brennan	NWS	10	Feb 21, 1922	42 years, 59 days	Liberty A.C. Clubroom, Burkburnett, Texas, U.S.	
155	Loss	69–37–21 (28)	Carl E. Morris	PTS	10	Feb 10, 1922	42 years, 48 days	Coliseum, Fort Worth, Texas, U.S.	
154	Loss	69–36–21 (28)	Harvey Perkins	PTS	10	Dec 27, 1921	42 years, 3 days	Iris Theatre, Casper, Wyoming, U.S.	
153	Loss	69–35–21 (28)	Ralph Brooks	NWS	4	Dec 17, 1921	41 years, 358 days	Forum, Wichita, Kansas, U.S.	
152	Win	69–35–21 (27)	Sully Montgomery	PTS	10	Dec 14, 1921	41 years, 355 days	Fort Worth, Texas, U.S.	
151	Win	68–35–21 (27)	Jack Danforth	KO	1 (10)	Sep 28, 1921	41 years, 278 days	Pueblo, Colorado, U.S.	
150	Win	67–35–21 (27)	George Coplen	KO	1 (10)	Sep 5, 1921	41 years, 255 days	Cripple Creek, Colorado, U.S.	
149	Loss	66–35–21 (27)	Willie Keeler	DQ	11 (15)	Jul 4, 1921	41 years, 192 days	Hartman's Garage, Montrose, Colorado, U.S.	
148	Loss	66–34–21 (27)	Tiny Jim Herman	PTS	4	Jan 29, 1921	41 years, 36 days	Armory, Seattle, Washington, U.S.	
147	Loss	66–33–21 (27)	Noel "Boy" McCormick	PTS	4	Nov 30, 1920	40 years, 342 days	Crystal Pool, Seattle, Washington, U.S.	
146	Loss	66–32–21 (27)	Young Hector	PTS	4	Nov 15, 1920	40 years, 327 days	Community House, Charleston, Washington, U.S.	
145	Loss	66–31–21 (27)	Young Hector	PTS	4	Sep 24, 1920	40 years, 275 days	Elks Club, Bremerton, Washington, U.S.	
144	Win	66–30–21 (27)	Steve Reynolds	PTS	4	Jun 17, 1920	40 years, 176 days	Liberty Park, Seattle, Washington, U.S.	
143	Loss	65–30–21 (27)	Young Hector	TKO	5 (6)	Jan 19, 1920	40 years, 26 days	Armory, Seattle, Washington, U.S.	
142	Draw	65–29–21 (27)	Willie Keeler	PTS	6	Jan 1, 1920	40 years, 8 days	Armory, Yakima, Washington, U.S.	
141	Win	65–29–20 (27)	Pete Jessler	TKO	3 (?)	Nov 14, 1919	39 years, 325 days	Yakima, Washington, U.S.	
140	Loss	64–29–20 (27)	Ole Anderson	PTS	4	Oct 3, 1919	39 years, 283 days	Aberdeen, Washington, U.S.	
139	Win	64–28–20 (27)	Harry Aune	KO	3 (10)	Sep 5, 1919	39 years, 255 days	Outdoor Arena, Mackay, Idaho, U.S.	
138	Loss	63–28–20 (27)	Jimmy Darcy	PTS	4	May 7, 1919	39 years, 134 days	Dreamland Arena, San Diego, California, U.S.	
137	Loss	63–27–20 (27)	Jerry Schumann	TKO	2 (4)	Apr 11, 1919	39 years, 108 days	Dreamland Rink, San Francisco, California, U.S.	
136	Loss	63–26–20 (27)	Bill LaRue	KO	1 (4)	Feb 22, 1919	39 years, 60 days	Coliseum, San Francisco, California, U.S.	
135	Loss	63–25–20 (27)	Jimmy Darcy	PTS	6	Feb 13, 1919	39 years, 51 days	Heilig Theater, Portland, Oregon, U.S.	
134	Loss	63–24–20 (27)	Billy Miske	KO	2 (10)	Dec 16, 1918	38 years, 357 days	Convention Hall, Tulsa, Oklahoma, U.S.	
133	Win	63–23–20 (27)	Bob Williams	KO	1 (10)	Nov 28, 1918	38 years, 339 days	Coliseum, Des Moines, Iowa, U.S.	
132	Win	62–23–20 (27)	Hugh Walker	NWS	10	Jun 27, 1918	38 years, 185 days	Joplin, Missouri, U.S.	
131	Loss	62–23–20 (26)	Jack Dempsey	KO	1 (10)	Feb 14, 1918	38 years, 52 days	Fort Sheridan, Illinois, U.S.	
130	Loss	62–22–20 (26)	Bob Devere	NWS	10	Mar 20, 1917	37 years, 86 days	Pioneer Sporting Club, New York City, New York, U.S.	
129	Win	62–22–20 (25)	Jack Dempsey	KO	1 (15)	Feb 13, 1917	37 years, 51 days	Trocadero Hall, Murray, Utah, U.S.	
128	Win	61–22–20 (25)	Texas Tate	DQ	3 (15)	Jul 25, 1916	36 years, 214 days	Chickasha, Oklahoma, U.S.	
127	Loss	60–22–20 (25)	Jack Dillon	KO	4 (15)	Jul 4, 1916	36 years, 193 days	Dewey, Oklahoma, U.S.	
126	Loss	60–21–20 (25)	Fred Fulton	KO	2 (10)	Mar 17, 1916	36 years, 84 days	Auditorium, Milwaukee, Wisconsin, U.S.	
125	Loss	60–20–20 (25)	Jack Dillon	NWS	10	Mar 10, 1916	36 years, 77 days	Manhattan A.C., New York City, New York, U.S.	
124	Loss	60–20–20 (24)	Battling Levinsky	NWS	10	Dec 25, 1915	36 years, 1 day	Broadway S.C., New York City, New York, U.S.	
123	Loss	60–20–20 (23)	Jack Dillon	NWS	10	Nov 30, 1915	35 years, 341 days	Broadway S.C., New York City, New York, U.S.	
122	Draw	60–20–20 (22)	Al Reich	PTS	10	Sep 22, 1915	35 years, 272 days	Kansas City, Missouri, U.S.	
121	Win	60–20–19 (22)	Morgan Williams	TKO	14 (15)	Sep 6, 1915	35 years, 256 days	Victor, Colorado, U.S.	
120	Win	59–20–19 (22)	Andy Malloy	KO	2 (20)	Jul 16, 1915	35 years, 204 days	Princess Theater, Pueblo, Colorado, U.S.	
119	Loss	58–20–19 (22)	Jim Coffey	KO	9 (10)	May 31, 1915	35 years, 158 days	Brighton Beach A.C., New York City, New York, U.S.	
118	Loss	58–19–19 (22)	Gunboat Smith	NWS	10	Feb 1, 1915	35 years, 39 days	Ohio National Guard Armory, Cincinnati, Ohio, U.S.	
117	Win	58–19–19 (21)	Al Reich	NWS	10	Jan 12, 1915	35 years, 19 days	Broadway S.C., New York City, New York, U.S.	
116	Loss	58–19–19 (20)	Tony Ross	NWS	10	Jan 1, 1915	35 years, 8 days	Germania Hall, Rochester, New York, U.S.	
115	Win	58–19–19 (19)	George Davis	KO	7 (10)	Dec 26, 1914	35 years, 2 days	Elmwood Music Hall, Buffalo, New York, U.S.	
114	Loss	57–19–19 (19)	Carl E. Morris	PTS	10	Oct 29, 1914	34 years, 309 days	Kansas City, Missouri, U.S.	
113	Loss	57–18–19 (19)	Battling Levinsky	NWS	10	Oct 20, 1914	34 years, 300 days	Broadway S.C., New York City, New York, U.S.	
112	Loss	57–18–19 (18)	Jack Dillon	PTS	10	Oct 5, 1914	34 years, 285 days	Association Park, Kansas City, Missouri, U.S.	
111	Win	57–17–19 (18)	Al Norton	KO	6 (10)	Sep 7, 1914	34 years, 257 days	Kansas City, Missouri, U.S.	
110	Loss	56–17–19 (18)	Carl E. Morris	DQ	9 (?)	Jun 8, 1914	34 years, 166 days	Joplin, Missouri, U.S.	
109	Loss	56–16–19 (18)	Jim Coffey	KO	4 (10)	Apr 24, 1914	34 years, 121 days	St. Nicholas Arena, New York City, New York, U.S.	
108	Draw	56–15–19 (18)	Jack Dillon	PTS	10	Mar 3, 1914	34 years, 69 days	Grand Avenue A.C., Kansas City, Missouri, U.S.	
107	Win	56–15–18 (18)	Jim Francis	KO	4 (10)	Feb 14, 1914	34 years, 52 days	Salt Lake City, Utah, U.S.	
106	Win	55–15–18 (18)	Tim Logan	KO	2 (15)	Jan 20, 1914	34 years, 27 days	Rhode Island A.C., Thornton, Rhode Island, U.S.	
105	Win	54–15–18 (18)	Jack Driscoll	KO	6 (?)	Jan 15, 1914	34 years, 22 days	Atlantic Garden A.C., New York City, New York, U.S.	
104	Loss	53–15–18 (18)	George Rodel	NWS	10	Dec 22, 1913	33 years, 363 days	Madison Square Garden, New York City, New York, U.S.	
103	Loss	53–15–18 (17)	Battling Levinsky	NWS	10	Dec 9, 1913	33 years, 350 days	Atlantic Garden A.C., New York City, New York, U.S.	
102	Loss	53–15–18 (16)	Gunboat Smith	TKO	5 (10)	Aug 8, 1913	33 years, 227 days	Madison Square Garden, New York City, New York, U.S.	
101	Draw	53–14–18 (16)	Jim Coffey	NWS	6	May 23, 1913	33 years, 150 days	Madison Square Garden, New York City, New York, U.S.	
100	Loss	53–14–18 (15)	Luther McCarty	NWS	6	Apr 16, 1913	33 years, 113 days	Olympia A.C., Philadelphia, Pennsylvania, U.S.	
99	Loss	53–14–18 (14)	Luther McCarty	TKO	16 (20)	Dec 10, 1912	32 years, 352 days	Vernon, California, U.S.	
98	Win	53–13–18 (14)	Charlie Miller	RTD	15 (20)	Sep 2, 1912	32 years, 253 days	Daly City, California, U.S.	
97	Loss	52–13–18 (14)	Jack Johnson	DQ	9 (45)	Jul 4, 1912	32 years, 193 days	East Las Vegas, Las Vegas, New Mexico, U.S.	For world heavyweight title; Flynn DQ'd for repeated head-butting
96	Win	52–12–18 (14)	Leopold McLaglan	KO	3 (?)	Feb 24, 1912	32 years, 62 days	Milwaukee, Wisconsin, U.S.	
95	Win	51–12–18 (14)	Al Williams	KO	2 (10)	Jan 17, 1912	32 years, 24 days	Riverdale Rink, Toronto, Ontario, Canada	
94	Win	50–12–18 (14)	Tony Caponi	KO	3 (10)	Dec 27, 1911	32 years, 3 days	Colonial Theater, Salt Lake City, Utah, U.S.	
93	ND	49–12–18 (14)	Charley Schmidt	ND	4	Nov 20, 1911	31 years, 331 days	Fort Smith, Arkansas, U.S.	
92	Win	49–12–18 (13)	Carl E. Morris	NWS	10	Sep 15, 1911	31 years, 265 days	Madison Square Garden, New York City, New York, U.S.	
91	Win	49–12–18 (12)	George Hess	KO	2 (?)	Sep 9, 1911	31 years, 259 days	Oklahoma City, Oklahoma, U.S.	
90	Win	48–12–18 (12)	George Haley	KO	7 (?)	Aug 11, 1911	31 years, 230 days	Lordsburg, New Mexico, U.S.	
89	Win	47–12–18 (12)	Al Kaufman	KO	10 (10)	May 5, 1911	31 years, 132 days	Hippodrome, Kansas City, Missouri, U.S.	
88	Win	46–12–18 (12)	Al Mandino	TKO	4 (15)	Mar 27, 1911	31 years, 93 days	Oklahoma A.C., Muskogee, Oklahoma, U.S.	
87	Win	45–12–18 (12)	Tony Caponi	TKO	9 (20)	Jan 2, 1911	31 years, 9 days	Arena, Vernon, California, U.S.	
86	Loss	44–12–18 (12)	Sam Langford	KO	8 (45)	Mar 17, 1910	30 years, 83 days	Jeffries' Arena, Vernon, California, U.S.	
85	Win	44–11–18 (12)	Sam Langford	NWS	10	Feb 8, 1910	30 years, 46 days	Naud Junction, Los Angeles, California, U.S.	
84	Win	44–11–18 (11)	Joe Willis	KO	6 (10)	Dec 31, 1909	30 years, 7 days	Naud Junction, Los Angeles, California, U.S.	
83	Win	43–11–18 (11)	Salinas Jack Burns	NWS	10	Oct 29, 1909	29 years, 309 days	McCarey's Pavilion, Los Angeles, California, U.S.	
82	Loss	43–11–18 (10)	Philadelphia Jack O'Brien	NWS	6	Jul 30, 1909	29 years, 218 days	City Auditorium, Denver, Colorado, U.S.	
81	Draw	43–11–18 (9)	Billy Papke	NWS	10	Jul 14, 1909	29 years, 202 days	Naud Junction, Los Angeles, California, U.S.	
80	Loss	43–11–18 (8)	Montana Jack Sullivan	NWS	10	Jun 1, 1909	29 years, 159 days	Naud Junction, Los Angeles, California, U.S.	
79	Win	43–11–18 (7)	Billy Papke	NWS	10	Mar 19, 1909	29 years, 85 days	McCarey's Pavilion, Los Angeles, California, U.S.	
78	Loss	43–11–18 (6)	Sam Langford	KO	1 (20)	Dec 21, 1908	28 years, 363 days	Coliseum, San Francisco, California, U.S.	
77	Win	43–10–18 (6)	Battling Johnson	NWS	10	Nov 24, 1908	28 years, 336 days	Jack McCarey's Club, Los Angeles, California, U.S.	
76	Loss	43–10–18 (5)	Jim Barry	NWS	10	Nov 6, 1908	28 years, 318 days	Naud Junction Pavilion, Los Angeles, California, U.S.	
75	Loss	43–10–18 (4)	Al Kaufman	KO	9 (10)	Aug 25, 1908	28 years, 245 days	Naud Junction Pavilion, Los Angeles, California, U.S.	
74	Draw	43–9–18 (4)	Jim Barry	PTS	10	Jul 8, 1908	28 years, 197 days	Wayside A.C., Denver, Colorado, U.S.	
73	Win	43–9–17 (4)	Battling Johnson	NWS	10	Apr 21, 1908	28 years, 119 days	McCarey's Cabin, Los Angeles, California, U.S.	
72	Win	43–9–17 (3)	Battling Johnson	NWS	10	Mar 24, 1908	28 years, 91 days	Pacific A.C., Los Angeles, California, U.S.	
71	Draw	43–9–17 (2)	Jack Twin Sullivan	NWS	10	Feb 11, 1908	28 years, 49 days	Pacific A.C., Los Angeles, California, U.S.	
70	Win	43–9–17 (1)	Bill Squires	KO	6 (20)	Dec 20, 1907	27 years, 361 days	Opera House, Bakersfield, California, U.S.	
69	Loss	42–9–17 (1)	Jack Johnson	KO	11 (20)	Nov 2, 1907	27 years, 313 days	Coffroth's Arena, San Francisco, California, U.S.	
68	Win	42–8–17 (1)	Tony Ross	DQ	18 (20)	Sep 11, 1907	27 years, 261 days	Grand Opera House, Pueblo, Colorado, U.S.	Low blow
67	Win	41–8–17 (1)	Frank Maxey	PTS	6	Aug 28, 1907	27 years, 247 days	Swink Hall, La Junta, Colorado, U.S.	
66	Win	40–8–17 (1)	Dave Barry	TKO	7 (20)	Jul 18, 1907	27 years, 206 days	Pueblo, Colorado, U.S.	
65	Win	39–8–17 (1)	George Gardiner	KO	18 (20)	Apr 17, 1907	27 years, 114 days	National Athletic Club, San Diego, California, U.S.	
64	ND	38–8–17 (1)	Jim Tremble	ND	4	Feb 22, 1907	27 years, 60 days	Naud Junction Pavilion, Los Angeles, California, U.S.	
63	Draw	38–8–17	Jack Twin Sullivan	PTS	20	Feb 12, 1907	27 years, 50 days	Naud Junction Pavilion, Los Angeles, California, U.S.	
62	Win	38–8–16	Jack Twin Sullivan	PTS	20	Jan 4, 1907	27 years, 11 days	Naud Junction Pavilion, Los Angeles, California, U.S.	
61	Loss	37–8–16	Tommy Burns	KO	15 (20)	Oct 2, 1906	26 years, 282 days	Naud Junction Pavilion, Los Angeles, California, U.S.	For world heavyweight title
60	Draw	37–7–16	Jack Twin Sullivan	PTS	15	Jul 12, 1906	26 years, 200 days	Pueblo, Colorado, U.S.	
59	Win	37–7–15	Morgan Williams	KO	4 (10)	Feb 15, 1906	26 years, 53 days	Pueblo, Colorado, U.S.	
58	Draw	36–7–15	Tom Kinsley	PTS	6	Feb 6, 1906	26 years, 44 days	Eagles Club, Denver, Colorado, U.S.	
57	Draw	36–7–14	Tom Kinsley	PTS	10	Dec 28, 1905	26 years, 4 days	Eagles Club, Denver, Colorado, U.S.	
56	Win	36–7–13	Mike 'Dummy' Rowan	TKO	9 (20)	Sep 4, 1905	25 years, 254 days	Fairgrounds, Silverton, Colorado, U.S.	Bout billed as for the Middleweight Championship of the Middle-West
55	Win	35–7–13	Mike 'Dummy' Rowan	KO	8 (10)	Jan 19, 1905	25 years, 26 days	Trinidad, Colorado, U.S.	Rowan failed to come out for the eighth round, claiming a broken collar bone
54	Draw	34–7–13	Tom Reilly	PTS	8	Nov 23, 1904	24 years, 335 days	Montana A.C., Butte, Montana, U.S.	Flynn and Reilly agreed to a draw if both were standing at the end of the fight
53	Draw	34–7–12	George Gardiner	PTS	10	Sep 16, 1904	24 years, 267 days	Denver A.C., Denver, Colorado, U.S.	
52	Win	34–7–11	Fred Cooley	KO	9 (20)	Jul 19, 1904	24 years, 208 days	Rover's Club, Pueblo, Colorado, U.S.	
51	Draw	33–7–11	Morgan Williams	PTS	20	Jun 14, 1904	24 years, 173 days	Pueblo, Colorado, U.S.	
50	Draw	33–7–10	Tom Reilly	PTS	20	Jun 9, 1904	24 years, 168 days	Grand Theater, Salt Lake City, Utah, U.S.	
49	Win	33–7–9	Ed McCoy	KO	2 (20)	Apr 16, 1904	24 years, 114 days	Opera House, Salida, Colorado, U.S.	Won vacant Colorado State heavyweight title
48	Draw	32–7–9	Harry Peppers	PTS	10	Mar 16, 1904	24 years, 83 days	Opera House, Salida, Colorado, U.S.	Won vacant middleweight championship of the west
47	Draw	32–7–8	Andy Walsh	PTS	20	Jan 27, 1904	24 years, 34 days	Rover Wheel & Athletic Club, Pueblo, Colorado, U.S.	
46	Loss	32–7–7	Jack Root	KO	8 (20)	Nov 26, 1903	23 years, 337 days	Rover's Club, Pueblo, Colorado, U.S.	
45	Win	32–6–7	Tim Hurley	KO	6 (20)	Sep 11, 1903	23 years, 261 days	Rover's Club, Pueblo, Colorado, U.S.	
44	Win	31–6–7	Tim Hurley	DQ	5 (20)	Aug 14, 1903	23 years, 233 days	Rover's Club, Pueblo, Colorado, U.S.	Hurley disqualified for hitting on a break
43	Draw	30–6–7	Morgan Williams	PTS	20	Jul 28, 1903	23 years, 216 days	Rover's Club, Pueblo, Colorado, U.S.	For USA Colorado State middleweight title
42	Win	30–6–6	Tom Kissell	KO	3 (10)	Jun 6, 1903	23 years, 164 days	Florence, Colorado, U.S.	
41	Win	29–6–6	Billy Malley	KO	11 (20)	May 12, 1903	23 years, 139 days	Rover's A.C., Pueblo, Colorado, U.S.	
40	Win	28–6–6	Cyclone Kelly	PTS	20	Mar 31, 1903	23 years, 97 days	Rover's A.C., Pueblo, Colorado, U.S.	
39	Win	27–6–6	Ed Kelly	KO	20 (20)	Jan 27, 1903	23 years, 34 days	Rover Gymnasium, Pueblo, Colorado, U.S.	
38	Win	26–6–6	Ashton Yale	KO	8 (20)	Dec 11, 1902	22 years, 352 days	Rover's Club, Pueblo, Colorado, U.S.	
37	Draw	25–6–6	Tom Kinsley	PTS	10	Oct 16, 1902	22 years, 296 days	Colombo Hall, Albuquerque, New Mexico, U.S.	
36	Draw	25–6–5	Ed Kinsley	PTS	20	Oct 10, 1902	22 years, 290 days	Pueblo, Colorado, U.S.	
35	Win	25–6–4	Jack Graham	DQ	7 (25)	Sep 26, 1902	22 years, 276 days	Douglas, Wyoming, U.S.	
34	Draw	24–6–4	Tom Kinsley	PTS	15	Sep 19, 1902	22 years, 269 days	Pueblo, Colorado, U.S.	
33	Win	24–6–3	Kid Rowley	KO	2 (15)	Sep 1, 1902	22 years, 251 days	Pueblo, Colorado, U.S.	Date and location are uncertain
32	Win	23–6–3	Ed Burnes	KO	11 (20)	Aug 22, 1902	22 years, 241 days	United States of America	Date and location are uncertain
31	Win	22–6–3	Barney Passon	KO	12 (20)	Jul 8, 1902	22 years, 196 days	Pueblo, Colorado, U.S.	Date and location are uncertain
30	Draw	21–6–3	Joe Cotton	PTS	20	Jun 23, 1902	22 years, 181 days	Salt Lake A.C., Salt Lake City, Utah, U.S.	
29	Draw	21–6–2	Mike 'Dummy' Rowan	PTS	20	Jun 16, 1902	22 years, 174 days	Dewey Theater, Park City, Utah, U.S.	
28	Win	21–6–1	Tom Hensley	KO	7 (10)	Jun 14, 1902	22 years, 172 days	Victor, Colorado, U.S.	
27	Win	20–6–1	Joe Tracey	KO	15 (20)	Jun 9, 1902	22 years, 167 days	Pueblo, Colorado, U.S.	Date and location may be incorrect
26	Win	19–6–1	Jack Graham	DQ	5 (20)	May 12, 1902	22 years, 139 days	Salt Lake A.C., Salt Lake City, Utah, U.S.	Graham twice attempted to kick Flynn
25	Win	18–6–1	Willard Bean	PTS	20	Apr 7, 1902	22 years, 104 days	Salt Lake City, Utah, U.S.	
24	Loss	17–6–1	Jack Kid Lavalle	TKO	2 (10)	Mar 24, 1902	22 years, 90 days	Pueblo, Colorado, U.S.	Date and result are uncertain
23	Win	17–5–1	George Condie	KO	2 (20)	Feb 28, 1902	22 years, 66 days	Salt Lake A.C., Salt Lake City, Utah, U.S.	
22	Win	16–5–1	Jim Francis	KO	4 (10)	Feb 24, 1902	22 years, 62 days	Ogden, Utah, U.S.	
21	Win	15–5–1	Jim Francis	KO	4 (10)	Feb 14, 1902	22 years, 52 days	Salt Lake A.C., Salt Lake City, Utah, U.S.	
20	Win	14–5–1	Pat Malloy	PTS	6	Sep 1, 1901	21 years, 251 days	Butte, Montana, U.S.	
19	Win	13–5–1	Mex Davis	PTS	6	Jul 11, 1901	21 years, 199 days	Rover's Club, Pueblo, Colorado, U.S.	
18	Loss	12–5–1	Mose LaFontise	TKO	4 (25)	Feb 14, 1900	20 years, 52 days	Butte A.C., Butte, Montana, U.S.	
17	Loss	12–4–1	Mose LaFontise	PTS	10	Dec 19, 1899	19 years, 360 days	Butte Athletic Association, Butte, Montana, U.S.	
16	Win	12–3–1	Jack Fogarty	KO	7 (10)	Nov 10, 1899	19 years, 321 days	Butte, Montana, U.S.	
15	Loss	11–3–1	Denis Ike Hayes	TKO	4 (10)	Sep 29, 1899	19 years, 279 days	Butte, Montana, U.S.	
14	Win	11–2–1	Kid Dawson	KO	3 (6)	Jun 24, 1899	19 years, 182 days	Butte, Montana, U.S.	Date and location are uncertain
13	Win	10–2–1	Jim Francis	PTS	6	Jun 10, 1899	19 years, 168 days	Butte, Montana, U.S.	Date and number of rounds are uncertain
12	Loss	9–2–1	Roy Mendy	KO	2 (6)	May 13, 1899	19 years, 140 days	Butte, Montana, U.S.	Date and scheduled rounds are uncertain
11	Loss	9–1–1	Ed Seaman	KO	5 (6)	Mar 21, 1899	19 years, 87 days	Butte, Montana, U.S.	Date and result are uncertain
10	Win	9–0–1	CA Nicholas	KO	1 (20)	Mar 19, 1899	19 years, 85 days	Belt, Montana, U.S.	
9	Win	8–0–1	Fred Davis	PTS	6	Feb 11, 1899	19 years, 49 days	Butte, Montana, U.S.	Date and location are uncertain
8	Win	7–0–1	Kid Chambers	KO	4 (6)	Jan 28, 1899	19 years, 35 days	Butte, Montana, U.S.	Date and location are uncertain
7	Win	6–0–1	Jim Freeman	TKO	2 (20)	Jul 20, 1897	15 years, 208 days	Great Falls, Montana, U.S.	
6	Draw	5–0–1	Ed Hennessey	TD	2 (10)	Feb 18, 1897	15 years, 56 days	Theater Comique, Sacramento, California, U.S.	Various fouls by both fighters
5	Win	5–0	Jim Morrissey	KO	2 (10)	Jan 26, 1897	15 years, 33 days	Browne's Comique, Sacramento, California, U.S.	
4	Win	4–0	Billy Lewis	DQ	19 (?)	Jul 4, 1894	14 years, 192 days	Williams, New Mexico, U.S.	
3	Win	3–0	Swifty	TKO	5 (?)	May 25, 1894	14 years, 152 days	Williams, Arizona, U.S.	
2	Win	2–0	Herman Frazier	KO	17 (?)	Apr 21, 1894	14 years, 118 days	Hurt's Hall, Los Cerillos, New Mexico, U.S.	Billed for the welterweight championship of the South
1	Win	1–0	W F Roberts	KO	4 (?)	Aug 5, 1893	13 years, 224 days	Old Aztec Store, Santa Fe, New Mexico, U.S.	Professional debut(?)

=== Unofficial record ===
170 fights	81 wins	61 losses
By knockout	56	26
By decision	19	31
By disqualification	6	4
Draws	26	
No contests	2	

Record with the inclusion of newspaper decisions to the win/loss/draw column.

No.	Result	Record	Opponent	Type	Round	Date	Age	Location	Notes
170	Loss	81–61–26 (2)	Steve Ramos	TKO	2 (6)	Oct 30, 1925	45 years, 310 days	Capital City Arena, Phoenix, Arizona, U.S.	
169	Loss	81–60–26 (2)	Tony Canales	PTS	3	Sep 8, 1925	45 years, 258 days	El Paso, Texas, U.S.	
168	Loss	81–59–26 (2)	Sergeant Jack Lynch	PTS	10	May 16, 1925	45 years, 143 days	Kelly's Pastime Hall, Winslow, Arizona, U.S.	
167	Loss	81–58–26 (2)	Young Spence	NWS	10	Sep 3, 1924	44 years, 254 days	Soledad Roof, San Antonio, Texas, U.S.	
166	Loss	81–57–26 (2)	Sam Langford	PTS	8	Jan 6, 1924	44 years, 13 days	Ford's Arena, Ciudad Juarez, Chihuahua, Mexico	
165	Loss	81–56–26 (2)	Sam Langford	KO	3 (15)	Oct 19, 1923	43 years, 299 days	Mexico City, Distrito Federal, Mexico	
164	Win	81–55–26 (2)	Tiger Flowers	RTD	5 (?)	Sep 17, 1923	43 years, 267 days	Mexico City, Distrito Federal, Mexico	Flowers unable to continue because of an injured hand
163	Loss	80–55–26 (2)	Andres Balsa	DQ	8 (?)	Aug 5, 1923	43 years, 224 days	Mexico City, Distrito Federal, Mexico	
162	Loss	80–54–26 (2)	Sam Langford	PTS	10	Aug 2, 1923	43 years, 221 days	Mexico City, Distrito Federal, Mexico	
161	Loss	80–53–26 (2)	Sully Montgomery	KO	3 (?)	Jun 2, 1923	43 years, 160 days	Mexico City, Distrito Federal, Mexico	
160	Draw	80–52–26 (2)	Ole Anderson	PTS	10	May 26, 1922	42 years, 153 days	Omaha, Nebraska, U.S.	
159	Loss	80–52–25 (2)	Chief Metoquah	KO	6 (10)	May 3, 1922	42 years, 130 days	Guymon, Oklahoma, U.S.	
158	Win	80–51–25 (2)	Mike Schubert	KO	3 (?)	Apr 17, 1922	42 years, 114 days	Hoisington, Texas, U.S.	
157	Win	79–51–25 (2)	Ben Sheff	KO	2 (?)	Mar 17, 1922	42 years, 83 days	Fort Worth, Texas, U.S.	
156	Draw	78–51–25 (2)	Abe Brennan	NWS	10	Feb 21, 1922	42 years, 59 days	Liberty A.C. Clubroom, Burkburnett, Texas, U.S.	
155	Loss	78–51–24 (2)	Carl E. Morris	PTS	10	Feb 10, 1922	42 years, 48 days	Coliseum, Fort Worth, Texas, U.S.	
154	Loss	78–50–24 (2)	Harvey Perkins	PTS	10	Dec 27, 1921	42 years, 3 days	Iris Theatre, Casper, Wyoming, U.S.	
153	Loss	78–49–24 (2)	Ralph Brooks	NWS	4	Dec 17, 1921	41 years, 358 days	Forum, Wichita, Kansas, U.S.	
152	Win	78–48–24 (2)	Sully Montgomery	PTS	10	Dec 14, 1921	41 years, 355 days	Fort Worth, Texas, U.S.	
151	Win	77–48–24 (2)	Jack Danforth	KO	1 (10)	Sep 28, 1921	41 years, 278 days	Pueblo, Colorado, U.S.	
150	Win	76–48–24 (2)	George Coplen	KO	1 (10)	Sep 5, 1921	41 years, 255 days	Cripple Creek, Colorado, U.S.	
149	Loss	75–48–24 (2)	Willie Keeler	DQ	11 (15)	Jul 4, 1921	41 years, 192 days	Hartman's Garage, Montrose, Colorado, U.S.	
148	Loss	75–47–24 (2)	Tiny Jim Herman	PTS	4	Jan 29, 1921	41 years, 36 days	Armory, Seattle, Washington, U.S.	
147	Loss	75–46–24 (2)	Noel "Boy" McCormick	PTS	4	Nov 30, 1920	40 years, 342 days	Crystal Pool, Seattle, Washington, U.S.	
146	Loss	75–45–24 (2)	Young Hector	PTS	4	Nov 15, 1920	40 years, 327 days	Community House, Charleston, Washington, U.S.	
145	Loss	75–44–24 (2)	Young Hector	PTS	4	Sep 24, 1920	40 years, 275 days	Elks Club, Bremerton, Washington, U.S.	
144	Win	75–43–24 (2)	Steve Reynolds	PTS	4	Jun 17, 1920	40 years, 176 days	Liberty Park, Seattle, Washington, U.S.	
143	Loss	74–43–24 (2)	Young Hector	TKO	5 (6)	Jan 19, 1920	40 years, 26 days	Armory, Seattle, Washington, U.S.	
142	Draw	74–42–24 (2)	Willie Keeler	PTS	6	Jan 1, 1920	40 years, 8 days	Armory, Yakima, Washington, U.S.	
141	Win	74–42–23 (2)	Pete Jessler	TKO	3 (?)	Nov 14, 1919	39 years, 325 days	Yakima, Washington, U.S.	
140	Loss	73–42–23 (2)	Ole Anderson	PTS	4	Oct 3, 1919	39 years, 283 days	Aberdeen, Washington, U.S.	
139	Win	73–41–23 (2)	Harry Aune	KO	3 (10)	Sep 5, 1919	39 years, 255 days	Outdoor Arena, Mackay, Idaho, U.S.	
138	Loss	72–41–23 (2)	Jimmy Darcy	PTS	4	May 7, 1919	39 years, 134 days	Dreamland Arena, San Diego, California, U.S.	
137	Loss	72–40–23 (2)	Jerry Schumann	TKO	2 (4)	Apr 11, 1919	39 years, 108 days	Dreamland Rink, San Francisco, California, U.S.	
136	Loss	72–39–23 (2)	Bill LaRue	KO	1 (4)	Feb 22, 1919	39 years, 60 days	Coliseum, San Francisco, California, U.S.	
135	Loss	72–38–23 (2)	Jimmy Darcy	PTS	6	Feb 13, 1919	39 years, 51 days	Heilig Theater, Portland, Oregon, U.S.	
134	Loss	72–37–23 (2)	Billy Miske	KO	2 (10)	Dec 16, 1918	38 years, 357 days	Convention Hall, Tulsa, Oklahoma, U.S.	
133	Win	72–36–23 (2)	Bob Williams	KO	1 (10)	Nov 28, 1918	38 years, 339 days	Coliseum, Des Moines, Iowa, U.S.	
132	Win	71–36–23 (2)	Hugh Walker	NWS	10	Jun 27, 1918	38 years, 185 days	Joplin, Missouri, U.S.	
131	Loss	70–36–23 (2)	Jack Dempsey	KO	1 (10)	Feb 14, 1918	38 years, 52 days	Fort Sheridan, Illinois, U.S.	
130	Loss	70–35–23 (2)	Bob Devere	NWS	10	Mar 20, 1917	37 years, 86 days	Pioneer Sporting Club, New York City, New York, U.S.	
129	Win	70–34–23 (2)	Jack Dempsey	KO	1 (15)	Feb 13, 1917	37 years, 51 days	Trocadero Hall, Murray, Utah, U.S.	
128	Win	69–34–23 (2)	Texas Tate	DQ	3 (15)	Jul 25, 1916	36 years, 214 days	Chickasha, Oklahoma, U.S.	
127	Loss	68–34–23 (2)	Jack Dillon	KO	4 (15)	Jul 4, 1916	36 years, 193 days	Dewey, Oklahoma, U.S.	
126	Loss	68–33–23 (2)	Fred Fulton	KO	2 (10)	Mar 17, 1916	36 years, 84 days	Auditorium, Milwaukee, Wisconsin, U.S.	
125	Loss	68–32–23 (2)	Jack Dillon	NWS	10	Mar 10, 1916	36 years, 77 days	Manhattan A.C., New York City, New York, U.S.	
124	Loss	68–31–23 (2)	Battling Levinsky	NWS	10	Dec 25, 1915	36 years, 1 day	Broadway S.C., New York City, New York, U.S.	
123	Loss	68–30–23 (2)	Jack Dillon	NWS	10	Nov 30, 1915	35 years, 341 days	Broadway S.C., New York City, New York, U.S.	
122	Draw	68–29–23 (2)	Al Reich	PTS	10	Sep 22, 1915	35 years, 272 days	Kansas City, Missouri, U.S.	
121	Win	68–29–22 (2)	Morgan Williams	TKO	14 (15)	Sep 6, 1915	35 years, 256 days	Victor, Colorado, U.S.	
120	Win	67–29–22 (2)	Andy Malloy	KO	2 (20)	Jul 16, 1915	35 years, 204 days	Princess Theater, Pueblo, Colorado, U.S.	
119	Loss	66–29–22 (2)	Jim Coffey	KO	9 (10)	May 31, 1915	35 years, 158 days	Brighton Beach A.C., New York City, New York, U.S.	
118	Loss	66–28–22 (2)	Gunboat Smith	NWS	10	Feb 1, 1915	35 years, 39 days	Ohio National Guard Armory, Cincinnati, Ohio, U.S.	
117	Win	66–27–22 (2)	Al Reich	NWS	10	Jan 12, 1915	35 years, 19 days	Broadway S.C., New York City, New York, U.S.	
116	Loss	65–27–22 (2)	Tony Ross	NWS	10	Jan 1, 1915	35 years, 8 days	Germania Hall, Rochester, New York, U.S.	
115	Win	65–26–22 (2)	George Davis	KO	7 (10)	Dec 26, 1914	35 years, 2 days	Elmwood Music Hall, Buffalo, New York, U.S.	
114	Loss	64–26–22 (2)	Carl E. Morris	PTS	10	Oct 29, 1914	34 years, 309 days	Kansas City, Missouri, U.S.	
113	Loss	64–25–22 (2)	Battling Levinsky	NWS	10	Oct 20, 1914	34 years, 300 days	Broadway S.C., New York City, New York, U.S.	
112	Loss	64–24–22 (2)	Jack Dillon	PTS	10	Oct 5, 1914	34 years, 285 days	Association Park, Kansas City, Missouri, U.S.	
111	Win	64–23–22 (2)	Al Norton	KO	6 (10)	Sep 7, 1914	34 years, 257 days	Kansas City, Missouri, U.S.	
110	Loss	63–23–22 (2)	Carl E. Morris	DQ	9 (?)	Jun 8, 1914	34 years, 166 days	Joplin, Missouri, U.S.	
109	Loss	63–22–22 (2)	Jim Coffey	KO	4 (10)	Apr 24, 1914	34 years, 121 days	St. Nicholas Arena, New York City, New York, U.S.	
108	Draw	63–21–22 (2)	Jack Dillon	PTS	10	Mar 3, 1914	34 years, 69 days	Grand Avenue A.C., Kansas City, Missouri, U.S.	
107	Win	63–21–21 (2)	Jim Francis	KO	4 (10)	Feb 14, 1914	34 years, 52 days	Salt Lake City, Utah, U.S.	
106	Win	62–21–21 (2)	Tim Logan	KO	2 (15)	Jan 20, 1914	34 years, 27 days	Rhode Island A.C., Thornton, Rhode Island, U.S.	
105	Win	61–21–21 (2)	Jack Driscoll	KO	6 (?)	Jan 15, 1914	34 years, 22 days	Atlantic Garden A.C., New York City, New York, U.S.	
104	Loss	60–21–21 (2)	George Rodel	NWS	10	Dec 22, 1913	33 years, 363 days	Madison Square Garden, New York City, New York, U.S.	
103	Loss	60–20–21 (2)	Battling Levinsky	NWS	10	Dec 9, 1913	33 years, 350 days	Atlantic Garden A.C., New York City, New York, U.S.	
102	Loss	60–19–21 (2)	Gunboat Smith	TKO	5 (10)	Aug 8, 1913	33 years, 227 days	Madison Square Garden, New York City, New York, U.S.	
101	Draw	60–18–21 (2)	Jim Coffey	NWS	6	May 23, 1913	33 years, 150 days	Madison Square Garden, New York City, New York, U.S.	
100	Loss	60–18–20 (2)	Luther McCarty	NWS	6	Apr 16, 1913	33 years, 113 days	Olympia A.C., Philadelphia, Pennsylvania, U.S.	
99	Loss	60–17–20 (2)	Luther McCarty	TKO	16 (20)	Dec 10, 1912	32 years, 352 days	Vernon, California, U.S.	
98	Win	60–16–20 (2)	Charlie Miller	RTD	15 (20)	Sep 2, 1912	32 years, 253 days	Daly City, California, U.S.	
97	Loss	59–16–20 (2)	Jack Johnson	DQ	9 (45)	Jul 4, 1912	32 years, 193 days	East Las Vegas, Las Vegas, New Mexico, U.S.	For world heavyweight title; Flynn DQ'd for repeated head-butting
96	Win	59–15–20 (2)	Leopold McLaglan	KO	3 (?)	Feb 24, 1912	32 years, 62 days	Milwaukee, Wisconsin, U.S.	
95	Win	58–15–20 (2)	Al Williams	KO	2 (10)	Jan 17, 1912	32 years, 24 days	Riverdale Rink, Toronto, Ontario, Canada	
94	Win	57–15–20 (2)	Tony Caponi	KO	3 (10)	Dec 27, 1911	32 years, 3 days	Colonial Theater, Salt Lake City, Utah, U.S.	
93	ND	56–15–20 (2)	Charley Schmidt	ND	4	Nov 20, 1911	31 years, 331 days	Fort Smith, Arkansas, U.S.	
92	Win	56–15–20 (1)	Carl E. Morris	NWS	10	Sep 15, 1911	31 years, 265 days	Madison Square Garden, New York City, New York, U.S.	
91	Win	55–15–20 (1)	George Hess	KO	2 (?)	Sep 9, 1911	31 years, 259 days	Oklahoma City, Oklahoma, U.S.	
90	Win	54–15–20 (1)	George Haley	KO	7 (?)	Aug 11, 1911	31 years, 230 days	Lordsburg, New Mexico, U.S.	
89	Win	53–15–20 (1)	Al Kaufman	KO	10 (10)	May 5, 1911	31 years, 132 days	Hippodrome, Kansas City, Missouri, U.S.	
88	Win	52–15–20 (1)	Al Mandino	TKO	4 (15)	Mar 27, 1911	31 years, 93 days	Oklahoma A.C., Muskogee, Oklahoma, U.S.	
87	Win	51–15–20 (1)	Tony Caponi	TKO	9 (20)	Jan 2, 1911	31 years, 9 days	Arena, Vernon, California, U.S.	
86	Loss	50–15–20 (1)	Sam Langford	KO	8 (45)	Mar 17, 1910	30 years, 83 days	Jeffries' Arena, Vernon, California, U.S.	
85	Win	50–14–20 (1)	Sam Langford	NWS	10	Feb 8, 1910	30 years, 46 days	Naud Junction, Los Angeles, California, U.S.	
84	Win	49–14–20 (1)	Joe Willis	KO	6 (10)	Dec 31, 1909	30 years, 7 days	Naud Junction, Los Angeles, California, U.S.	
83	Win	48–14–20 (1)	Salinas Jack Burns	NWS	10	Oct 29, 1909	29 years, 309 days	McCarey's Pavilion, Los Angeles, California, U.S.	
82	Loss	47–14–20 (1)	Philadelphia Jack O'Brien	NWS	6	Jul 30, 1909	29 years, 218 days	City Auditorium, Denver, Colorado, U.S.	
81	Draw	47–13–20 (1)	Billy Papke	NWS	10	Jul 14, 1909	29 years, 202 days	Naud Junction, Los Angeles, California, U.S.	
80	Loss	47–13–19 (1)	Montana Jack Sullivan	NWS	10	Jun 1, 1909	29 years, 159 days	Naud Junction, Los Angeles, California, U.S.	
79	Win	47–12–19 (1)	Billy Papke	NWS	10	Mar 19, 1909	29 years, 85 days	McCarey's Pavilion, Los Angeles, California, U.S.	
78	Loss	46–12–19 (1)	Sam Langford	KO	1 (20)	Dec 21, 1908	28 years, 363 days	Coliseum, San Francisco, California, U.S.	
77	Win	46–11–19 (1)	Battling Johnson	NWS	10	Nov 24, 1908	28 years, 336 days	Jack McCarey's Club, Los Angeles, California, U.S.	
76	Loss	45–11–19 (1)	Jim Barry	NWS	10	Nov 6, 1908	28 years, 318 days	Naud Junction Pavilion, Los Angeles, California, U.S.	
75	Loss	45–10–19 (1)	Al Kaufman	KO	9 (10)	Aug 25, 1908	28 years, 245 days	Naud Junction Pavilion, Los Angeles, California, U.S.	
74	Draw	45–9–19 (1)	Jim Barry	PTS	10	Jul 8, 1908	28 years, 197 days	Wayside A.C., Denver, Colorado, U.S.	
73	Win	45–9–18 (1)	Battling Johnson	NWS	10	Apr 21, 1908	28 years, 119 days	McCarey's Cabin, Los Angeles, California, U.S.	
72	Win	44–9–18 (1)	Battling Johnson	NWS	10	Mar 24, 1908	28 years, 91 days	Pacific A.C., Los Angeles, California, U.S.	
71	Draw	43–9–18 (1)	Jack Twin Sullivan	NWS	10	Feb 11, 1908	28 years, 49 days	Pacific A.C., Los Angeles, California, U.S.	
70	Win	43–9–17 (1)	Bill Squires	KO	6 (20)	Dec 20, 1907	27 years, 361 days	Opera House, Bakersfield, California, U.S.	
69	Loss	42–9–17 (1)	Jack Johnson	KO	11 (20)	Nov 2, 1907	27 years, 313 days	Coffroth's Arena, San Francisco, California, U.S.	
68	Win	42–8–17 (1)	Tony Ross	DQ	18 (20)	Sep 11, 1907	27 years, 261 days	Grand Opera House, Pueblo, Colorado, U.S.	Low blow
67	Win	41–8–17 (1)	Frank Maxey	PTS	6	Aug 28, 1907	27 years, 247 days	Swink Hall, La Junta, Colorado, U.S.	
66	Win	40–8–17 (1)	Dave Barry	TKO	7 (20)	Jul 18, 1907	27 years, 206 days	Pueblo, Colorado, U.S.	
65	Win	39–8–17 (1)	George Gardiner	KO	18 (20)	Apr 17, 1907	27 years, 114 days	National Athletic Club, San Diego, California, U.S.	
64	ND	38–8–17 (1)	Jim Tremble	ND	4	Feb 22, 1907	27 years, 60 days	Naud Junction Pavilion, Los Angeles, California, U.S.	
63	Draw	38–8–17	Jack Twin Sullivan	PTS	20	Feb 12, 1907	27 years, 50 days	Naud Junction Pavilion, Los Angeles, California, U.S.	
62	Win	38–8–16	Jack Twin Sullivan	PTS	20	Jan 4, 1907	27 years, 11 days	Naud Junction Pavilion, Los Angeles, California, U.S.	
61	Loss	37–8–16	Tommy Burns	KO	15 (20)	Oct 2, 1906	26 years, 282 days	Naud Junction Pavilion, Los Angeles, California, U.S.	For world heavyweight title
60	Draw	37–7–16	Jack Twin Sullivan	PTS	15	Jul 12, 1906	26 years, 200 days	Pueblo, Colorado, U.S.	
59	Win	37–7–15	Morgan Williams	KO	4 (10)	Feb 15, 1906	26 years, 53 days	Pueblo, Colorado, U.S.	
58	Draw	36–7–15	Tom Kinsley	PTS	6	Feb 6, 1906	26 years, 44 days	Eagles Club, Denver, Colorado, U.S.	
57	Draw	36–7–14	Tom Kinsley	PTS	10	Dec 28, 1905	26 years, 4 days	Eagles Club, Denver, Colorado, U.S.	
56	Win	36–7–13	Mike 'Dummy' Rowan	TKO	9 (20)	Sep 4, 1905	25 years, 254 days	Fairgrounds, Silverton, Colorado, U.S.	Bout billed as for the Middleweight Championship of the Middle-West
55	Win	35–7–13	Mike 'Dummy' Rowan	KO	8 (10)	Jan 19, 1905	25 years, 26 days	Trinidad, Colorado, U.S.	Rowan failed to come out for the eighth round, claiming a broken collar bone
54	Draw	34–7–13	Tom Reilly	PTS	8	Nov 23, 1904	24 years, 335 days	Montana A.C., Butte, Montana, U.S.	Flynn and Reilly agreed to a draw if both were standing at the end of the fight
53	Draw	34–7–12	George Gardiner	PTS	10	Sep 16, 1904	24 years, 267 days	Denver A.C., Denver, Colorado, U.S.	
52	Win	34–7–11	Fred Cooley	KO	9 (20)	Jul 19, 1904	24 years, 208 days	Rover's Club, Pueblo, Colorado, U.S.	
51	Draw	33–7–11	Morgan Williams	PTS	20	Jun 14, 1904	24 years, 173 days	Pueblo, Colorado, U.S.	
50	Draw	33–7–10	Tom Reilly	PTS	20	Jun 9, 1904	24 years, 168 days	Grand Theater, Salt Lake City, Utah, U.S.	
49	Win	33–7–9	Ed McCoy	KO	2 (20)	Apr 16, 1904	24 years, 114 days	Opera House, Salida, Colorado, U.S.	Won vacant Colorado State heavyweight title
48	Draw	32–7–9	Harry Peppers	PTS	10	Mar 16, 1904	24 years, 83 days	Opera House, Salida, Colorado, U.S.	Won vacant middleweight championship of the west
47	Draw	32–7–8	Andy Walsh	PTS	20	Jan 27, 1904	24 years, 34 days	Rover Wheel & Athletic Club, Pueblo, Colorado, U.S.	
46	Loss	32–7–7	Jack Root	KO	8 (20)	Nov 26, 1903	23 years, 337 days	Rover's Club, Pueblo, Colorado, U.S.	
45	Win	32–6–7	Tim Hurley	KO	6 (20)	Sep 11, 1903	23 years, 261 days	Rover's Club, Pueblo, Colorado, U.S.	
44	Win	31–6–7	Tim Hurley	DQ	5 (20)	Aug 14, 1903	23 years, 233 days	Rover's Club, Pueblo, Colorado, U.S.	Hurley disqualified for hitting on a break
43	Draw	30–6–7	Morgan Williams	PTS	20	Jul 28, 1903	23 years, 216 days	Rover's Club, Pueblo, Colorado, U.S.	For USA Colorado State middleweight title
42	Win	30–6–6	Tom Kissell	KO	3 (10)	Jun 6, 1903	23 years, 164 days	Florence, Colorado, U.S.	
41	Win	29–6–6	Billy Malley	KO	11 (20)	May 12, 1903	23 years, 139 days	Rover's A.C., Pueblo, Colorado, U.S.	
40	Win	28–6–6	Cyclone Kelly	PTS	20	Mar 31, 1903	23 years, 97 days	Rover's A.C., Pueblo, Colorado, U.S.	
39	Win	27–6–6	Ed Kelly	KO	20 (20)	Jan 27, 1903	23 years, 34 days	Rover Gymnasium, Pueblo, Colorado, U.S.	
38	Win	26–6–6	Ashton Yale	KO	8 (20)	Dec 11, 1902	22 years, 352 days	Rover's Club, Pueblo, Colorado, U.S.	
37	Draw	25–6–6	Tom Kinsley	PTS	10	Oct 16, 1902	22 years, 296 days	Colombo Hall, Albuquerque, New Mexico, U.S.	
36	Draw	25–6–5	Ed Kinsley	PTS	20	Oct 10, 1902	22 years, 290 days	Pueblo, Colorado, U.S.	
35	Win	25–6–4	Jack Graham	DQ	7 (25)	Sep 26, 1902	22 years, 276 days	Douglas, Wyoming, U.S.	
34	Draw	24–6–4	Tom Kinsley	PTS	15	Sep 19, 1902	22 years, 269 days	Pueblo, Colorado, U.S.	
33	Win	24–6–3	Kid Rowley	KO	2 (15)	Sep 1, 1902	22 years, 251 days	Pueblo, Colorado, U.S.	Date and location are uncertain
32	Win	23–6–3	Ed Burnes	KO	11 (20)	Aug 22, 1902	22 years, 241 days	United States of America	Date and location are uncertain
31	Win	22–6–3	Barney Passon	KO	12 (20)	Jul 8, 1902	22 years, 196 days	Pueblo, Colorado, U.S.	Date and location are uncertain
30	Draw	21–6–3	Joe Cotton	PTS	20	Jun 23, 1902	22 years, 181 days	Salt Lake A.C., Salt Lake City, Utah, U.S.	
29	Draw	21–6–2	Mike 'Dummy' Rowan	PTS	20	Jun 16, 1902	22 years, 174 days	Dewey Theater, Park City, Utah, U.S.	
28	Win	21–6–1	Tom Hensley	KO	7 (10)	Jun 14, 1902	22 years, 172 days	Victor, Colorado, U.S.	
27	Win	20–6–1	Joe Tracey	KO	15 (20)	Jun 9, 1902	22 years, 167 days	Pueblo, Colorado, U.S.	Date and location may be incorrect
26	Win	19–6–1	Jack Graham	DQ	5 (20)	May 12, 1902	22 years, 139 days	Salt Lake A.C., Salt Lake City, Utah, U.S.	Graham twice attempted to kick Flynn
25	Win	18–6–1	Willard Bean	PTS	20	Apr 7, 1902	22 years, 104 days	Salt Lake City, Utah, U.S.	
24	Loss	17–6–1	Jack Kid Lavalle	TKO	2 (10)	Mar 24, 1902	22 years, 90 days	Pueblo, Colorado, U.S.	Date and result are uncertain
23	Win	17–5–1	George Condie	KO	2 (20)	Feb 28, 1902	22 years, 66 days	Salt Lake A.C., Salt Lake City, Utah, U.S.	
22	Win	16–5–1	Jim Francis	KO	4 (10)	Feb 24, 1902	22 years, 62 days	Ogden, Utah, U.S.	
21	Win	15–5–1	Jim Francis	KO	4 (10)	Feb 14, 1902	22 years, 52 days	Salt Lake A.C., Salt Lake City, Utah, U.S.	
20	Win	14–5–1	Pat Malloy	PTS	6	Sep 1, 1901	21 years, 251 days	Butte, Montana, U.S.	
19	Win	13–5–1	Mex Davis	PTS	6	Jul 11, 1901	21 years, 199 days	Rover's Club, Pueblo, Colorado, U.S.	
18	Loss	12–5–1	Mose LaFontise	TKO	4 (25)	Feb 14, 1900	20 years, 52 days	Butte A.C., Butte, Montana, U.S.	
17	Loss	12–4–1	Mose LaFontise	PTS	10	Dec 19, 1899	19 years, 360 days	Butte Athletic Association, Butte, Montana, U.S.	
16	Win	12–3–1	Jack Fogarty	KO	7 (10)	Nov 10, 1899	19 years, 321 days	Butte, Montana, U.S.	
15	Loss	11–3–1	Denis Ike Hayes	TKO	4 (10)	Sep 29, 1899	19 years, 279 days	Butte, Montana, U.S.	
14	Win	11–2–1	Kid Dawson	KO	3 (6)	Jun 24, 1899	19 years, 182 days	Butte, Montana, U.S.	Date and location are uncertain
13	Win	10–2–1	Jim Francis	PTS	6	Jun 10, 1899	19 years, 168 days	Butte, Montana, U.S.	Date and number of rounds are uncertain
12	Loss	9–2–1	Roy Mendy	KO	2 (6)	May 13, 1899	19 years, 140 days	Butte, Montana, U.S.	Date and scheduled rounds are uncertain
11	Loss	9–1–1	Ed Seaman	KO	5 (6)	Mar 21, 1899	19 years, 87 days	Butte, Montana, U.S.	Date and result are uncertain
10	Win	9–0–1	CA Nicholas	KO	1 (20)	Mar 19, 1899	19 years, 85 days	Belt, Montana, U.S.	
9	Win	8–0–1	Fred Davis	PTS	6	Feb 11, 1899	19 years, 49 days	Butte, Montana, U.S.	Date and location are uncertain
8	Win	7–0–1	Kid Chambers	KO	4 (6)	Jan 28, 1899	19 years, 35 days	Butte, Montana, U.S.	Date and location are uncertain
7	Win	6–0–1	Jim Freeman	TKO	2 (20)	Jul 20, 1897	15 years, 208 days	Great Falls, Montana, U.S.	
6	Draw	5–0–1	Ed Hennessey	TD	2 (10)	Feb 18, 1897	15 years, 56 days	Theater Comique, Sacramento, California, U.S.	Various fouls by both fighters
5	Win	5–0	Jim Morrissey	KO	2 (10)	Jan 26, 1897	15 years, 33 days	Browne's Comique, Sacramento, California, U.S.	
4	Win	4–0	Billy Lewis	DQ	19 (?)	Jul 4, 1894	14 years, 192 days	Williams, New Mexico, U.S.	
3	Win	3–0	Swifty	TKO	5 (?)	May 25, 1894	14 years, 152 days	Williams, Arizona, U.S.	
2	Win	2–0	Herman Frazier	KO	17 (?)	Apr 21, 1894	14 years, 118 days	Hurt's Hall, Los Cerillos, New Mexico, U.S.	Billed for the welterweight championship of the South
1	Win	1–0	W F Roberts	KO	4 (?)	Aug 5, 1893	13 years, 224 days	Old Aztec Store, Santa Fe, New Mexico, U.S.	Professional debut(?)
