= World White Heavyweight Championship =

The White Heavyweight Championship was a title in pretense created when the "White Hopes" of the time had failed to wrest the title from the African-American world heavyweight champion Jack Johnson after four and one-half years. The first of the Great White Hopes, former world heavyweight champ James J. Jeffries, had failed to vanquish Johnson in 1910, leading to an elimination tournament of "White Hopes" in New York City in 1911.

== White Hopes ==
Al Palzer won the "White Hope" tournament organized by promoter Tom O'Rourke at New York City's National Sporting Club that was held in May 1911. O’Rourke had managed the legendary African American boxers Joe Walcott and George Dixon. He also had signed Palzer to a contract before the tournament, and likely manipulated it so that Palzer could win. Other White Hope tournaments were created in response to O'Rouke's contest.

On 19 December 1911, Palzer fought Al Kaufman in Brooklyn and scored a K.O. in the fifth round of their 10-round bout. Kaufman had fought Jack Johnson for the world heavyweight title in San Francisco on 9 September 1909. The 10-rounder ended in a no-decision, and the two fighters met in Reno, Nevada to box an exhibition in July 1910.

On New Year's Day 1913, Palzer met Luther McCarty in Vernon, California to determine the "White Heavyweight Championship" of the world. McCarty won the title by way of a T.K.O. in the 18th round. It would be a title he would hold for the rest of his life which would only be a short five months.

On 24 May 1913, Canadian Arthur Pelkey vied for McCarty's title at Tommy Burns's Arena in Calgary, Alberta. Burns had been the world heavyweight champ who had lost his title to Jack Johnson on Boxing Day in 1908.

Approximately two minutes into the first round of the scheduled 10-round bout, the 210 lbs. Pekley K.O.-ed the 200 lbs. McCarty. Eight minutes later, McCarty was pronounced dead. Pelkey reportedly broke down and wept when told of McCarty's death. Tommy Burns's Arena burned down the following day, likely as a result of arson.

A coroner's jury ruled that McCarty had died of a cerebral hemorrhage. The ruling held that he had not been killed by a blow delivered by Pelkey but that the hemorrhage probably was the result of a previous injury, likely suffered while riding a horse. Pelkey later claimed that his legal expenses linked to McCarty's death bankrupted him.

Pelkey reportedly was never the same fighter after killing McCarty. He lost the white heavyweight title to Gunboat Smith on New Year's Day 1914 at Coffroth's Arena in Daly City, California via a T.K.O. in the 15th round of the scheduled 20-round bout.

In London on 16 July 1914, Smith lost the title to European heavyweight champ Georges Carpentier when he was disqualified in the sixth round of their scheduled 20-round bout. The white heavyweight title bout sported a purse worth 9,000 pounds sterling (equivalent to approximately $1,359,643 in today's funds). Carpentier would be the last to hold the world white heavyweight crown. He fought one more fight, beating Kid Jackson in Bourdeaux, France on July 26 before joining the French military with the outbreak of World War I.

When "The Great White Hope" Jess Willard beat Jack Johnson for the world heavyweight title on 5 April 1915, the world white heavyweight crown became defunct. No heavyweight champ would offer a title shot to a black heavyweight challenger for 22 years, until James J. Braddock lost his title to Joe Louis in 1937.

== Max Baer ==
Max Baer was awarded a belt declaring him the “White Heavyweight Champion of the World” after he scored a first round T.K.O. over Pat Cominsky in a bout at Roosevelt Stadium in Jersey City, New Jersey on 26 September 1940, but it was a publicity stunt. The fight was not promoted as being for the white heavyweight championship, and Cominsky would not have won the belt had he beaten Baer.

The belt was a publicity stunt dreamed up by boxing promoters who were trying to pressure promoter Mike Jacobs into giving the ex-world heavyweight champion a rematch with current champ Joe Louis. (Louis had K.O.ed Baer in his first fight after losing his title to James J. Braddock, who would later lose his title to Louis.) Jacobs did not give Baer another bout with Louis. Baer retired after his next fight, when he lost via a T.K.O. to Lou Nova, who did get a shot at Joe Louis.

== List of champions ==
#	Name	Reign	Date	Days held	Location	Defenses	Notes
1	Luther McCarty	1	January 1, 1913	143	Vernon, California; USA	1	McCarty wins title with 18th round T.K.O. of Al Palzer.
2	Arthur Pelkey	1	May 24, 1913	222	Calgary, Alberta; Canada	3	McCarty died after first round K.O.
3	Gunboat Smith	1	January 1, 1914	196	Daly City, California; USA	1	Smith wins title via 15th round T.K.O.
4	Georges Carpentier	1	July 16, 1914	Unknown	Kensington, London; United Kingdom	0	Title became defunct when Jess Willard defeated Jack Johnson for world heavyweight crown on April 5, 1915.

== See also ==
- World Colored Heavyweight Championship
