= Al Palzer =

American boxer

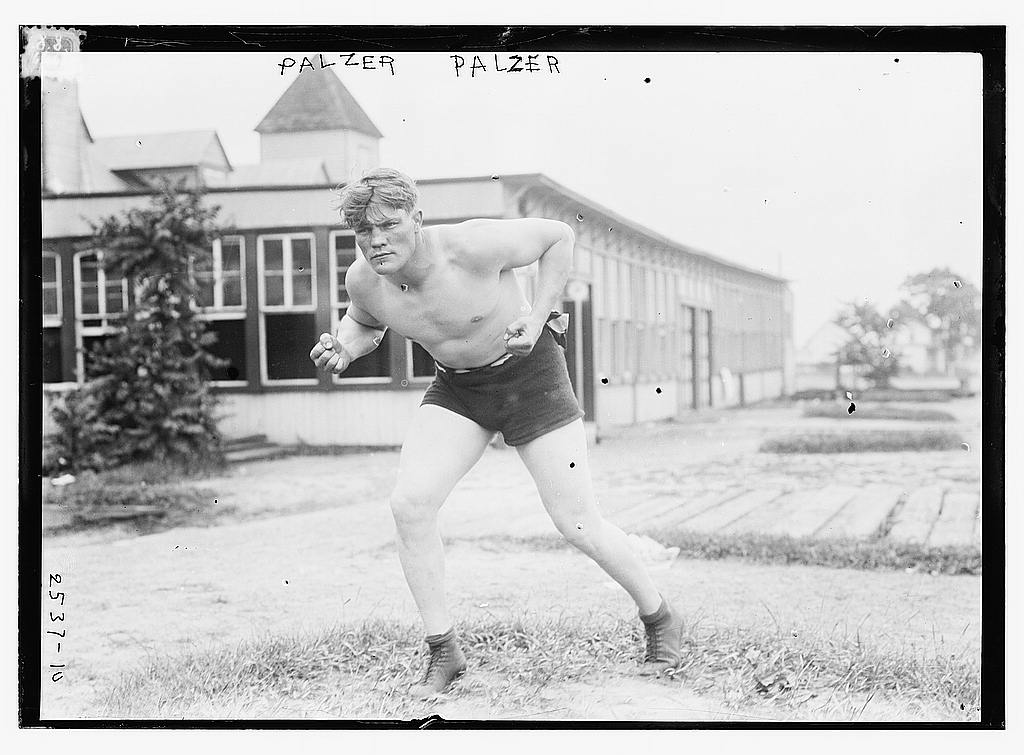
Al Palzer circa 1910

Al Palzer (January 1, 1890 – July 26, 1917) was a boxer who fought from 1911 to 1915, one of the "White Hopes" during the reign of world heavyweight champion Jack Johnson, an African American. The 6 feet 3 inches (1.91 m) Palzer, who was German-American, fought in the heavyweight division at a weight of 218 to 228 lbs. Palzer was one of the first boxers to fight for the World White Heavyweight Championship title.

== Biography ==
He was born on January 1, 1890.

On March 9, 1911, he lost a newspaper decision to Frank Moran in a 10-round bout held in Brooklyn, New York. Moran had fought Johnson in a four-round exhibition in April 1909 in Pittsburgh and later lost a title match with Johnson in Paris on June 27, 1914.

Palzer participated in a "White Hope" tournament organized by promoter Tom O'Rourke at New York City's National Sporting Club that was held in May 1911. Ironically, O’Rourke had managed the legendary African American boxers Joe Walcott and George Dixon. He also had signed Palzer to a contract before the tournament, and likely manipulated it so that Palzer could win. Other White Hope tournaments were created in response to O'Rouke's contest.

On December 19, 1911, Palzer fought Al Kaufman in Brooklyn and scored a K.O. in the fifth round of their 10-round bout. Kaufman had fought Jack Johnson for the world heavyweight title in San Francisco on September 9, 1909. The 10-rounder ended in a no-decision, and the two fighters met in Reno, Nevada, to box an exhibition in July 1910.

On New Year's Day 1913, Palzer met Luther McCarty in Vernon, California, to determine the "White Heavyweight Championship" of the world. McCarty won the title by way of a T.K.O. in the 18th round. It would be a title he would hold for the rest of his life, which would only be a short five months.

Palzer retired in 1915 after having racked up a record of nine wins (six by K.O.) against four losses. He also lost four newspaper decisions.

He died on July 26, 1917, when he was shot to death by his father.
