= The Egg Crate Wallop =

1919 film by Jerome Storm

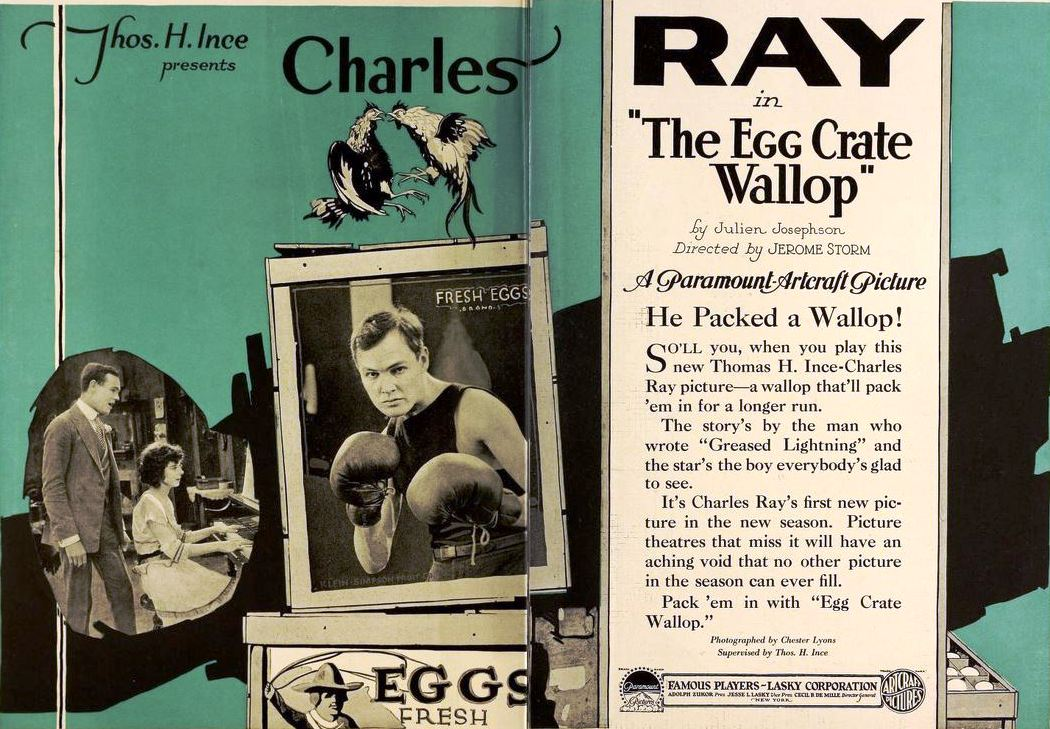
- Ad for film
- Directed by: Jerome Storm
- Written by: Julien Josephson
- Produced by: Thomas H. Ince
- Starring: Charles Ray; Colleen Moore; Jack Connolly; J. P. Lockney; George B. Williams; Frederick Moore; Otto Hoffman
- Cinematography: Ted D. McCord (as T. D. McCord)
- Edited by: Edwin Robbins
- Production company: Thomas H. Ince Productions
- Distributed by: Famous Players–Lasky/Paramount Pictures
- Release date: September 28, 1919
- Running time: 5 reels
- Country: United States
- Language: Silent (English intertitles)

The Egg Crate Wallop is a 1919 American silent comedy film starring Charles Ray and featuring actress Colleen Moore. The film was directed by Jerome Storm and Thomas H. Ince was its producer.

== Plot ==
Jim Kelly works for a railroad express company in a small Midwest town. After years of heavy lifting, he has developed quite a punch. He is infatuated with Kitty Haskell, the daughter of his boss, whom he has worked with for years. Jim has a rival for Kitty's attentions, a city boy who one day watches Mr. Haskell deposit money in the railroad safe. He memorized the combination and later steals the deposit from the safe. Suspicion for the theft falls on both Mr. Haskell and Jim, and Jim decides to go on the run, thinking that Mr. Haskell is guilty and hoping to divert attention from him. He goes to the city, develops his boxing skills, moves to the top of the roster and on the night of the big fight he refuses to throw the bout. He discovers his rival with some of the missing cash, and turns him in... freeing Mr. Haskell and winning the love of Kitty.

== Cast ==
- Charles Ray as Jim Kelly
- Colleen Moore as Kitty Haskell
- Jack Connolly as Perry Woods
- J. P. Lockney as Dave Haskell
- George B. Williams 'Fatty' Brennan (credited as George Williams)
- Frederick Moore as Assistant Promoter (credited as Fred Moore)
- Otto Hoffman as 'Spider' Blake
- Edward Jobson as Constable (credited as Ed Jobson)
- Dewitt Van Court as Fight Referee
- Arthur Millett as 'Battling' Miller
- Al Kaufman as Fighter (credited as Al Kauffman)
- Ray Kirkwood as Fighter
- Cliff Jordan as Fighter
- Jimmie Fortney as Fighter
- Izzie Glassor as Fighter

== Production ==
Jerome Storm had directed many of Charles Ray's films, most with an athletic theme. Besides this film with Ray as a boxer, he would star in The Busher with Colleen, wherein he was a baseball player. A number of real boxers were brought in to spar with Ray, and were filmed as characters.

== Preservation status ==
The film is listed FIAF / Library of Congress database as being preserved in the Gosfilmofond collection in Russia.
