= Gunboat Smith =

American boxer (1887–1974)

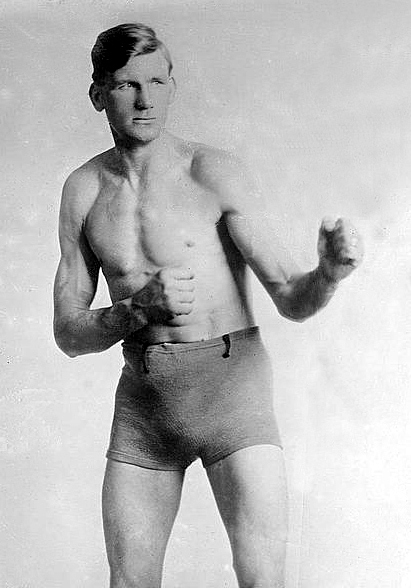
- Smith, early 1900s

Personal information
- Nickname: Gunboat
- Born: Edward Smith; February 17, 1887 Philadelphia, Pennsylvania, U.S.
- Died: August 6, 1974 (aged 87) Leesburg, Florida, U.S.
- Height: 6 ft 2 in (1.88 m)
- Weight: Heavyweight

Boxing career
- Reach: 72 in (180 cm)
- Stance: Orthodox

Boxing record
- Total fights: 140
- Wins: 81
- Win by KO: 38
- Losses: 49 (references vary)
- Draws: 13

Edward "Gunboat" Smith (February 17, 1887 – August 6, 1974) was an Irish American boxer, film actor and later a boxing referee. During his career, Smith faced twelve different Boxing Hall of Famers a combined total of 23 times. Among the all-time greats he faced were Jack Dempsey, Harry Greb, Sam Langford, and Georges Carpentier.

== Boxing career ==
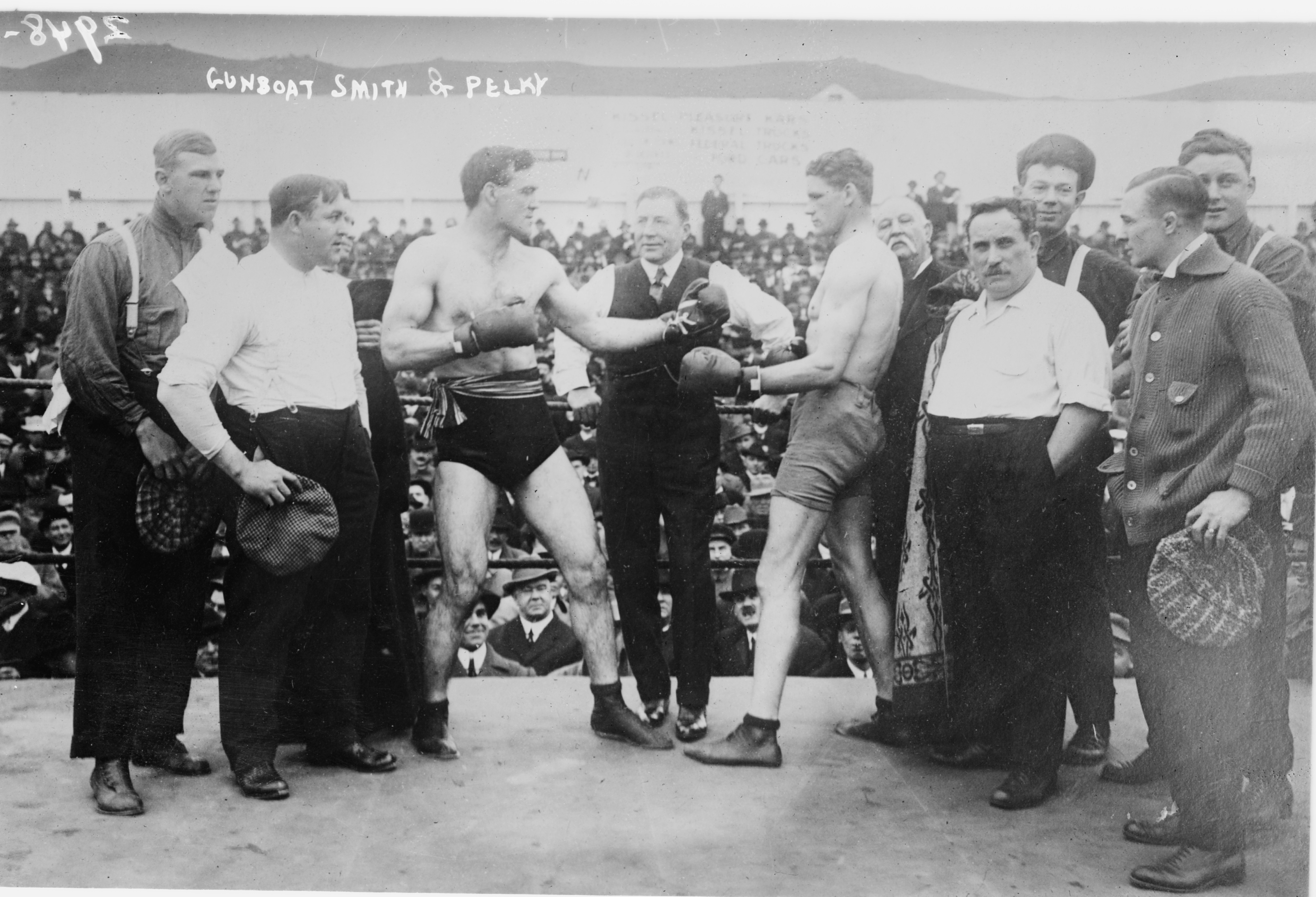
Smith (right) during his first encounter with Arthur Pelkey

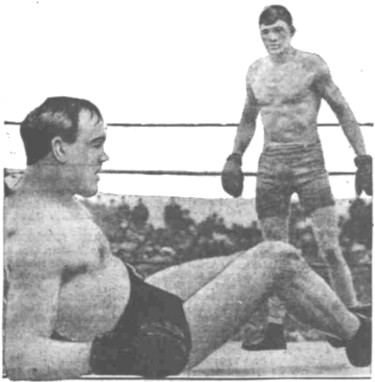
Gunboat Smith stands over a knocked-down Pelkey during a match on January 1, 1914 in San Francisco, California. Smith defeated Pelkey for the World White Heavyweight Championship.

Smith was born in Philadelphia, Pennsylvania. He spent much of his youth in orphanages, working on farms and on the railroads. He joined the U.S. Navy, where he began boxing and won the heavyweight championship of the Pacific Fleet.

In 1910, Smith became known in the Oakland and San Francisco areas by serving as a sparring partner for Jack Johnson and Stanley Ketchel before their heavyweight title fight there. Author Jack London knew Smith and helped fund his training.

From 1912–1915, Smith established himself as a leading candidate for the heavyweight title, beating, among others, British and British Empire champion Bombardier Billy Wells and future world champion Jess Willard, and beating and losing to Sam Langford in two fights. He fought many other ranked fighters, but before his death, Smith was asked to name the greatest fighter he ever met. His response: Langford, in his words, “The best of all of them.”

In 1914, Smith won the World White Heavyweight Championship. This title, created by boxing promoters due to the unpopularity of the black heavyweight champion Jack Johnson, was never widely recognized. He lost the "title" to Georges Carpentier later that year in a bout with a purse of 9,000 pounds sterling.

After 1916, Smith's career suffered a decline; in 1917, he suffered a loss by decision to future champion Jack Dempsey in a hotly contested four-round fight. A year later, he was knocked to the canvas 9 times by Dempsey, suffering a one-sided second-round knock out.

In 1920 and 1921, Smith suffered a string of KO losses and retired after suffering a one-round knockout to the great heavyweight contender Harry Wills. He finished with a record of 81 wins, 46 losses, and 13 draws, a total of 140 bouts. “Not a great record on paper,” Dave Allen remarked, “but one that becomes much more impressive when you take into consideration that he fought the very best of his era.”

Smith was lean and scrappy, an excellent boxer who moved well and hit sharply with both hands. Among the men he defeated were Willard, Langford, Wells, Battling Levinsky, Carl Morris, Frank Moran, and Fireman Jim Flynn.

== Professional boxing record ==
52 Wins (38 Knockouts), 28 Defeats (12 Knockouts), 10 Draws, 1 No Contest
Res.	Record	Opponent	Type	Rd., Time	Date	Location	Notes
Loss	52-28-10	(United States) Harry Wills	KO	1 (20), 1:07	1921-10-10	Stadium, Havana, Cuba	
Loss	52-27-10	(United States) Bob Martin	KO	3 (10)	1921-05-30	(United States) Huntington, West Virginia	
Loss	52-26-10	(United States) Al Roberts	KO	10 (12)	1921-03-09	(United States) Commonwealth Sporting Club, New York, New York	
Loss	52-25-10	(United States) Harry Greb	KO	1 (10)	1920-10-21	(United States) Springbrook Park, South Bend, Indiana	
Loss	—N/a	(United States) Bob Roper	NWS	10	1920-09-06	(United States) Springbrook Park, Fort Worth, Texas	Newspaper decision
Draw	52-24-10	(United States) Bob Roper	PTS	15	1920-08-09	(United States) Columbus, Ohio	
Win	—N/a	(United States) Texas Tate	NWS	12	1920-08-03	(United States) Panther Park, Fort Worth, Texas	Newspaper decision
Loss	—N/a	(United States) Chuck Wiggins	NWS	10	1920-07-15	(United States) Ramona Baseball Park, Grand Rapids, Michigan	Newspaper decision
Win	—N/a	(Italy) Tony Melchior	NWS	10	1920-06-26	(United States) Ramona Baseball Park, East Chicago, Indiana	Newspaper decision
Loss	52-24-9	(United States) Lee Anderson	PTS	4	1920-05-13	(United States) San Francisco Coliseum, San Francisco	
Loss	52-23-9	(United States) Fred Fulton	KO	2 (10)	1920-04-07	(United States) Milwaukie Coliseum, Milwaukie, Oregon	
Win	52-22-9	(United States) Andre Anderson	PTS	4	1920-03-10	(United States) American Legion A.A, Fresno, California	
Loss	51-22-9	(United States) Bill Tate	PTS	4	1920-02-25	(United States) Oakland Auditorium, Oakland, California	
Win	51-21-9	(United States) Willie Meehan	PTS	4	1920-02-04	(United States) Oakland Auditorium, Oakland, California	
Win	50-21-9	(United States) Carl Morris	PTS	4	1920-01-23	(United States) American Legion A.A, Fresno, California	
Draw	49-21-9	(United States) Ole Anderson	PTS	4	1919-12-11	(United States) San Francisco Coliseum, San Francisco	
Draw	49-21-8	(United States) Carl Morris	PTS	4	1919-12-03	(United States) Oakland Auditorium, Oakland	
Win	49-21-7	(United States) Fat LaRue	PTS	4	1919-11-19	(United States) Oakland Auditorium, Oakland	
Loss	48-21-7	(United States) Frank Farmer	PTS	6	1919-11-05	(United States) Seattle Arena, Seattle, Washington	
Loss	48-20-7	(United Kingdom) Noel "Boy" McCormick	PTS	4	1919-10-30	(United States) San Francisco Coliseum, San Francisco	
Loss	48-19-7	(United States) K.O. Kruvosky	PTS	4	1919-10-23	(United States) San Francisco Coliseum, San Francisco	
Loss	48-18-7	(United States) Jack Dempsey	KO	2 (8)	1918-12-30	(United States) Broadway Auditorium, Buffalo, New York	
Loss	—N/a	(United States) Billy Miske	NWS	8	1918-07-12	(United States) International League Ballpark, Jersey City, New Jersey	Newspaper decision
Draw	48-17-7	(United States) Tom McMahon	PTS	15	1918-07-04	(United States) Highland Park, Dayton, Ohio	
Loss	—N/a	(United States) Leo Houck	NWS	6	1918-05-27	(United States) Erne Club, Lancaster, Pennsylvania	Newspaper decision
Loss	48-17-6	(United States) Billy Miske	PTS	10	1918-04-12	(United States) Atlanta Auditorium, Atlanta, Georgia	
Loss	—N/a	(United States) Clay Turner	NWS	10	1918-04-01	(United States) Majestic Theatre, Wilkes-Barre, Pennsylvania	Newspaper decision
Loss	—N/a	(United States) Hugh Walker	NWS	12	1918-03-08	(United States) Joplin, Missouri	Newspaper decision
Win	—N/a	(United States) Emmett Kid Wagner	NWS	10	1918-02-18	(United States) Majestic Theatre, Wilkes-Barre	Newspaper decision
Loss	48-16-6	(Austria) Charley Weinert	PTS	12	1918-01-09	(United States) Marieville Gardens, North Providence, Rhode Island	
Loss	48-15-6	(United States) Fred Fulton	TKO	7 (10)	1917-11-27	(United States) Arcadia Rink, Minneapolis, Minnesota	
Loss	48-14-6	(United States) Jack Dempsey	PTS	4	1917-10-02	(United States) Recreation Park, San Francisco	
Win	—N/a	(United States) Frank Moran	NWS	10	1917-09-07	(United States) St. Nicholas Arena, New York	Newspaper decision
Loss	—N/a	(United States) Kid Norfolk	NWS	10	1917-08-20	(United States) Airdome A.C., Rochester, New York	Newspaper decision
Win	—N/a	(United States) Bill Tate	NWS	10	1917-08-10	(United States) Brown's Gym A.A., Queens, New York	Newspaper decision
Draw	—N/a	(United States) Kid Norfolk	NWS	10	1917-08-03	(United States) Urban Liberty Park, Buffalo	Newspaper decision
Win	—N/a	(United States) Jack Clifford	NWS	10	1917-06-02	(United States) Clermont Avenue Rink, Brooklyn	Newspaper decision
Draw	—N/a	(United States) Bob McAllister	NWS	10	1917-05-29	(United States) Pioneer Sporting Club, New York	Newspaper decision
Loss	48-13-6	(United States) Jack Dillon	PTS	20	1917-02-16	(United States) Louisiana Auditorium, New Orleans, Louisiana	
Draw	48-12-6	(United States) Jack Moran	PTS	12	1917-01-31	(United States) Saint Louis, Missouri	
Loss	—N/a	(United States) Battling Levinsky	NWS	10	1917-01-01	(United States) Clermont Avenue Rink, Brooklyn	Newspaper decision
Loss	—N/a	(United Kingdom) Tom Cowler	NWS	10	1916-12-25	(United States) Flower City A.C., Rochester, New York	Newspaper decision
Win	—N/a	(United States) Frank Moran	NWS	10	1916-12-18	(United States) Clermont Avenue Rink, Brooklyn	Newspaper decision
Loss	48-12-5	(United States) Battling Levinsky	PTS	12	1917-01-01	(United States) Arena (Armory A.A.), Brooklyn	
Win	—N/a	(United States) Joe Cox	NWS	10	1916-10-03	(United States) Broadway Arena, Brooklyn	Newspaper decision
Win	—N/a	(United Kingdom) Tom Cowler	NWS	10	1916-09-26	(United States) Broadway Arena, Brooklyn	Newspaper decision
Win	—N/a	(Republic of Ireland) Jim Coffey	NWS	6	1916-09-23	(United States) National A.C., Philadelphia, Pennsylvania	Newspaper decision
Win	48-11-5	(United States) Cleve Hawkins	TKO	3 (10)	1916-09-18	(United States) Clermont Avenue Rink, Brooklyn	
Win	—N/a	(United States) Tom McMahon	NWS	10	1916-07-10	(United States) Rochester, New York	Newspaper decision
Win	47-11-5	(Canada) Arthur Pelkey	PTS	8	1916-06-07	(United States) Phoenix A.C., Memphis, Tennessee	
Loss	—N/a	(United States) Battling Levinsky	NWS	6	1916-05-15	(United States) Olympia A.C., Philadelphia	Newspaper decision
Win	—N/a	(United States) Bob Devere	NWS	10	1916-04-28	(United States) Syracuse Arena, Syracuse, New York	Newspaper decision
Loss	46-11-5	(United States) Carl Morris	PTS	10	1916-05-15	(United States) Tulsa, Oklahoma	
Loss	—N/a	(United States) Dan Flynn	NWS	10	1916-03-30	(United States) Manhattan Opera House, New York	Newspaper decision
Loss	—N/a	(United States) Jack Dillon	NWS	10	1916-03-14	(United States) Broadway Arena, Brooklyn	Newspaper decision
Loss	46-10-5	(Republic of Ireland) Jim Coffey	KO	4 (10), 1:55	1915-11-29	(United States) Madison Square Garden, New York	
Win	—N/a	(United States) Joe Cox	NWS	8	1915-11-09	(United States) Saint Louis Coliseum, Saint Louis	Newspaper Decision
Loss	46-9-5	(Australia) Colin Bell	PTS	10	1915-10-07	(Canada) Sohmer Park, Montreal, Quebec	
Win	—N/a	(United States) Al Reich	NWS	10	1915-10-04	(United States) St. Nicholas Arena, New York	Newspaper decision
Win	—N/a	(United States) Sailor Jack Carroll	NWS	10	1915-09-04	(United States) Broadway S.C, Brooklyn	Newspaper decision
Win	—N/a	(United States) Jack Hemple	NWS	10	1915-08-18	(United States) St. Nicholas Arena, New York	Newspaper decision
Win	—N/a	(United Kingdom) Tom Cowler	NWS	10	1915-07-28	(United States) St. Nicholas Arena, New York	Newspaper decision
Loss	—N/a	(Austria) Charley Weinert	NWS	10	1915-07-01	(United States) Ebbets Field, Brooklyn	Newspaper decision
Win	—N/a	(United States) Dick Gilbert	NWS	12	1915-05-10	(United States) National A.C, Denver, Colorado	Newspaper decision
Win	46-8-5	(United States) Tom McCarty	PTS	12	1915-04-20	(United States) Arena (Atlas A.A.), Boston, Massachusetts	
Win	—N/a	(Austria) Charley Weinert	NWS	10	1915-04-13	(United States) Broadway Arena, Brooklyn	Newspaper decision
Win	—N/a	(United States) Jack Reed	NWS	10	1915-03-27	(United States) Irving A.C., Brooklyn	Newspaper decision
Loss	—N/a	(United States) Jack Dillon	NWS	10	1915-03-16	(United States) Milwaukee Auditorium, Milwaukee	Newspaper decision
Win	—N/a	(United States) Fireman Jim Flynn	NWS	10	1915-02-01	(United States) Cincinnati, Ohio	Newspaper decision
Win	45-8-5	(United States) Battling Levinsky	PTS	20	1915-01-27	(United States) Greenwall Theater, New Orleans	
Draw	44-8-5	(United States) Battling Levinsky	PTS	12	1915-01-01	(United States) Waterbury Auditorium, Waterbury, Connecticut	
Win	44-8-4	(United States) Chick Carsey	TKO	3 (10)	1914-12-28	(United States) Long Acre A.C, New York	
Win	43-8-4	(United States) Tom McCarty	TKO	4 (10)	1914-12-23	(United States) Manhattan Casino, New York	
Win	—N/a	(Republic of Ireland) Jim Coffey	NWS	10	1914-12-15	(United States) Madison Square Garden, New York	Newspaper decision
Loss	42-8-4	(Canada) Sam Langford	KO	3 (12)	1914-10-20	(United States) Arena (Atlas A.A.), Boston	
Loss	—N/a	(United States) Battling Levinsky	NWS	10	1914-10-09	(United States) Manhattan Casino, New York	Newspaper decision
Win	—N/a	(United States) Cyclone Johnny Thompson	NWS	6	1914-09-28	(United States) Duquesne Garden, Pittsburgh, Pennsylvania	Newspaper decision
Loss	42-7-4	(France) Georges Carpentier	DQ	6 (20)	1914-07-16	(United Kingdom) Olympia, Kensington, London	Lost "White" heavyweight title
Win	—N/a	(United States) Jack Blackburn	NWS	6	1914-05-20	(United States) National A.C., Philadelphia	Newspaper decision
Win	42-6-4	(Canada) Arthur Pelkey	TKO	15 (20)	1914-01-01	(United States) Coffroth's Arena, Daly City, California	Won "White" heavyweight title
Win	41-6-4	(Canada) Sam Langford	PTS	12	1913-11-17	(United States) Arena (Atlas A.A.), Boston	
Win	40-6-4	(United States) Charley Miller	KO	3 (10)	1913-10-31	(United States) Atlantic Garden A.C, New York	
Win	39-6-4	(Italy) Tony Ross	KO	10 (12), 1:30	1913-10-21	(United States) Arena (Atlas A.A.), Boston	
Win	38-6-4	(United States) Carl Morris	DQ	5 (10)	1913-10-09	(United States) Madison Square Garden, New York	
Win	37-6-4	(United States) Fireman Jim Flynn	TKO	5 (10)	1913-08-08	(United States) Madison Square Garden, New York	
Win	36-6-4	(South Africa) George Rodel	TKO	3 (10)	1913-06-27	(United States) Madison Square Garden, New York	
Win	35-6-4	(United States) Jess Willard	PTS	20	1913-05-20	(United States) Eighth Street Arena, San Francisco	
Win	—N/a	(South Africa) George Rodel	NWS	10	1913-04-11	(United States) New Amsterdam Opera House, New York	Newspaper Decision
Win	34-6-4	(Canada) Fred McKay	KO	2 (10)	1913-04-02	(United States) Fairmont A.C., Brooklyn	
Win	33-6-4	(United Kingdom) Bombardier Billy Wells	KO	2 (10)	1913-03-14	(United States) Madison Square Garden, New York	

== After boxing ==
After his retirement, Smith went on to have a variety of jobs: runner on Wall Street, private policeman at Madison Square Garden and Yankee Stadium, and an actor in several small roles in silent films, including The Great Gatsby and Wings, the first Academy Award-winner for Best Picture. He also refereed boxing matches, such as the Harry Greb vs. Tiger Flowers middleweight championship bout in 1926 and the controversial Max Schmeling vs. Jack Sharkey return heavyweight championship contest in 1932.

He died in 1974 in Florida.

== Partial filmography ==
- Manhattan (1924) - Joe Madden
- The Shock Punch (1925) - Terrence O'Rourke
- Lovers in Quarantine (1925) - Sailor Sheldon
- The Fear Fighter (1925) - Prison Inmate
- Lovers in Quarantine (1925) - Minor Role (uncredited)
- Bashful Buccaneer (1925)
- Let's Get Married (1926) - Slattery
- The Arizona Streak (1926) - Jim
- Say It Again (1926) - Gunner Jones
- The Great Gatsby (1926) - Bert
- Wings (1927) - The Sergeant
- We're All Gamblers (1927) - Gunboat
- The City Gone Wild (1927) - Policeman
- Midnight Rose (1928) - Casey

Titles in pretence
Preceded by Arthur Pelkey	World White Heavyweight Champion; January 1, 1914 - July 16, 1914	Succeeded by Georges Carpentier
