= Great White (disambiguation) =

Great White is an American rock band.

The Great White or Great White may also refer to:

== Animals ==
- Great white shark, a species of shark
- Great white egret, a species of egret
- Great white heron, several species
- Great white owl, a species of owl
- Great white pelican, a species of pelican

== People ==
- Greg Norman (born 1955), Australian golf player nicknamed The Great White Shark
- Paul Wight (born 1972), American pro wrestler sometimes introduced as The Great Wight
- Sheamus (born 1978), Irish professional wrestler nicknamed The Great White

== Roller coasters ==
- The Great White (Morey's Piers), a wooden roller coaster at Morey's Piers
- The Great White (SeaWorld San Antonio), a steel roller coaster at SeaWorld San Antonio

== Entertainment ==
- Great White (album), the first album by Great White
- Great White (1981 film), an Italian film similar to Jaws
- Great White (2021 film), an Australian survival horror film
- Great White Shark (comics), a comic book supervillain
- The Great White Hope, a 1970 film about a boxing champion
- Great White Games, a games company
- Great White Way, nickname for a section of Broadway in Manhattan
- Great White North, SCTV sketch featuring Bob and Doug McKenzie

== Other uses ==
- Great White Brotherhood, beings of great power in Theosophy or New Age
- Great White Fleet, nickname for the United States Navy battle fleet of 1907-1909

== See also ==
- Great White Hope (disambiguation)
- Great White North (disambiguation)
