= Great White Hope =

Great White Hope may refer to:

== People ==
- James J. Jeffries (1875–1953), American boxer
- Jess Willard (1881–1968), American boxer
- William Warren Barbour (1888–1943), American amateur boxer
- Luther McCarty (1892–1913), American boxer
- Jerry Quarry (1945–1999), American boxer
- Gerry Cooney (born 1956), American boxer
- Larry Bird (born 1956), American basketball player
- Willie de Wit (born 1961), Canadian boxer
- Tommy Morrison (1969–2013), American boxer
- Al Kaufman (1886 – 1957), American boxer and film actor
- Al Palzer (1890 – 1917) German-American boxer

== Other ==
- The Great White Hope, a 1967 play by Howard Sackler
- The Great White Hope (film), a 1970 motion picture adapted from the play
- "Great White Hope", a song by Styx on the 1978 album Pieces of Eight

== See also ==
- The Great White Hype, a 1996 U.S. boxing sports-comedy film
- World White Heavyweight Championship, a boxing title in pretense from 1911 to 1914
- The White Hope (disambiguation)
- Great White (disambiguation)
