= The White Hope =

The White Hope may refer to:

- The White Hope (1915 film), a silent film directed by Frank Wilson
- The White Hope (1922 film), a silent film also directed by Frank Wilson
- The Coming of Bill, novel by P. G. Wodehouse originally published as The White Hope

== See also ==
- Great White Hope (disambiguation)
