= Al Kaufman =

American boxer (1886–1957)

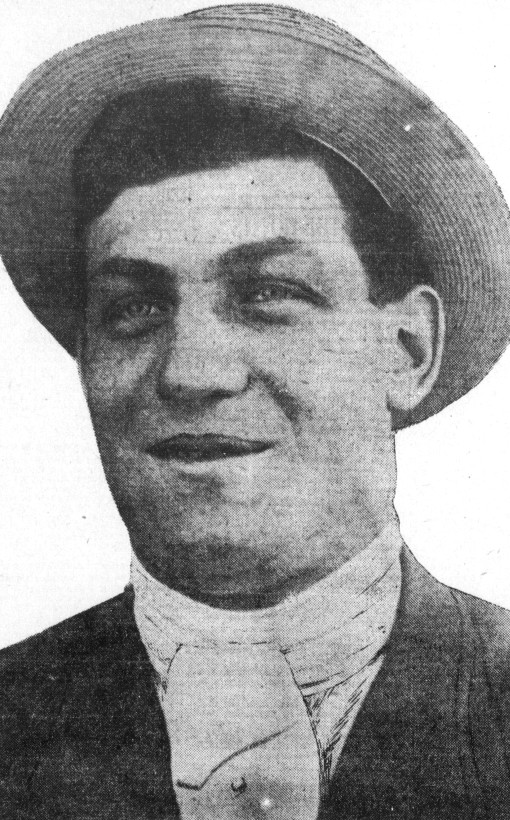
Kaufman, circa 1908

Al Kaufman (6 January 1886 – 7 April 1957) was an American boxer and film actor.

== Biography ==
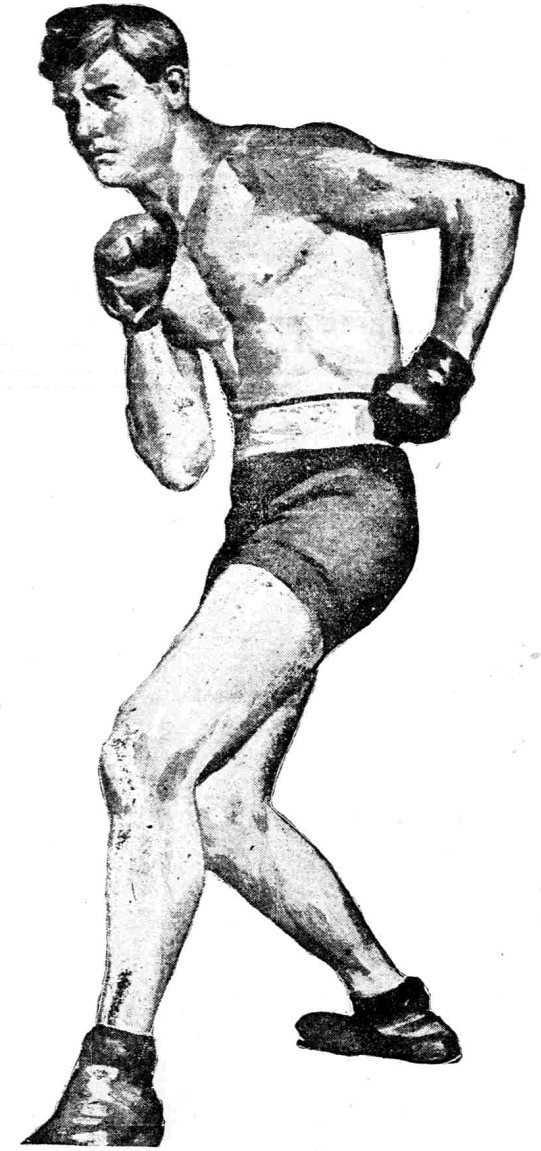
A sketch of Kaufman, circa 1906

Kaufman, born on September 25, 1888, in North Dakota, was a heavyweight boxer and one of the "White Hopes" of the era when Jack Johnson, an African American, was the world heavyweight champion. The 6′1″ Kaufman, a German-American, fought out of his hometown of San Francisco, California at a weight of between 185 and 205 lbs. in a career that stretched from 1905 to 1915. He was a muscular boxer, who fought cautiously but who could punch hard.

Kaufman fought Johnson for the world heavyweight title. Before that bout, Johnson had attended a match between Kaufman and Tony Ross held at the Fairmont Athletic Club in The Bronx on April 13, 1909. Kaufman, who was being touted as a contender for Johnson's title. won a newspaper decision in the 10-round bout. It was reported that Johnson, at ringside, laughed at the two boxers.

Five months later, on the 9th of September, Kaufman met Johnson at the San Francisco's Mission Street Arena in a championship fight. The Associated Press reported that Johnson landed his punches at will and could have ended the fight at any time during its 10 rounds. The fight went the distance and Johnson won a newspaper decision. Kaufman only landed two effective punches during the fight.

Two years later, on 28 December 1911, Kaufman was K.O.ed in the fifth round of scheduled 10-rounder in Brooklyn by Al Palzer, the winner of a "White Hope" elimination tournament who would later fight for the World White Heavyweight Championship against Luther McCarty. McCarty, in turn, beat Kaufman on 12 October 1912 via a T.K.O. in the second round of a scheduled 20-round bout in San Francisco. McCarthy had floored Kaufman three times with rights to the chin, sending him through the ropes into the lap of a journalist who helped him into the ring. The fight was stopped by the San Francisco chief of police.

Six months later, Kaufman served as the sparring partner for McCarty, who had won the White World Heavyweight title from Palzer on New Year's Day. On 16 May 1913, fighting on the undercard in Philadelphia (McCarty beat Fireman Jim Flynn in the main event) Kaufman won what was until later his last fight when he scored a T.K.O. over Al Benedict in the fourth round of a six-rounder. After a 15-month layoff, he fought and lost twice in 1914 and scored a no decision in his last pro fight on New Year's Day 1915.

Kaufman finished his career with an official record of 22 wins (17 via K.O.) against seven losses (having been K.O.ed five times). In addition, he won five newspaper decisions and lost one.

Kaufman appeared in several films including the silent boxing comedy The Egg Crate Wallop (1919).

== Selected filmography ==
- The Egg Crate Wallop (1919)
- Daredevil Jack (1920)
- Tiger True (1921)
- Marry in Haste (1924)
- The Dangerous Coward (1924)
- Walloping Kid (1926)
- Red Hot Hoofs (1926)
- The Battling Kangaroo (1926)
