= Carl E. Morris =

American boxer

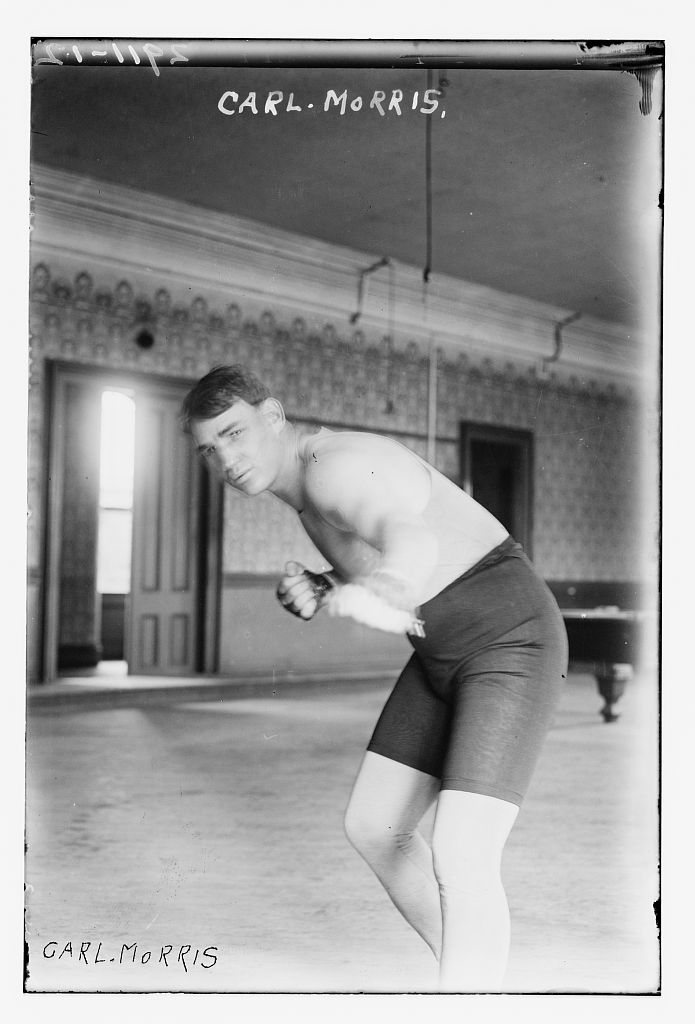
Carl Morris

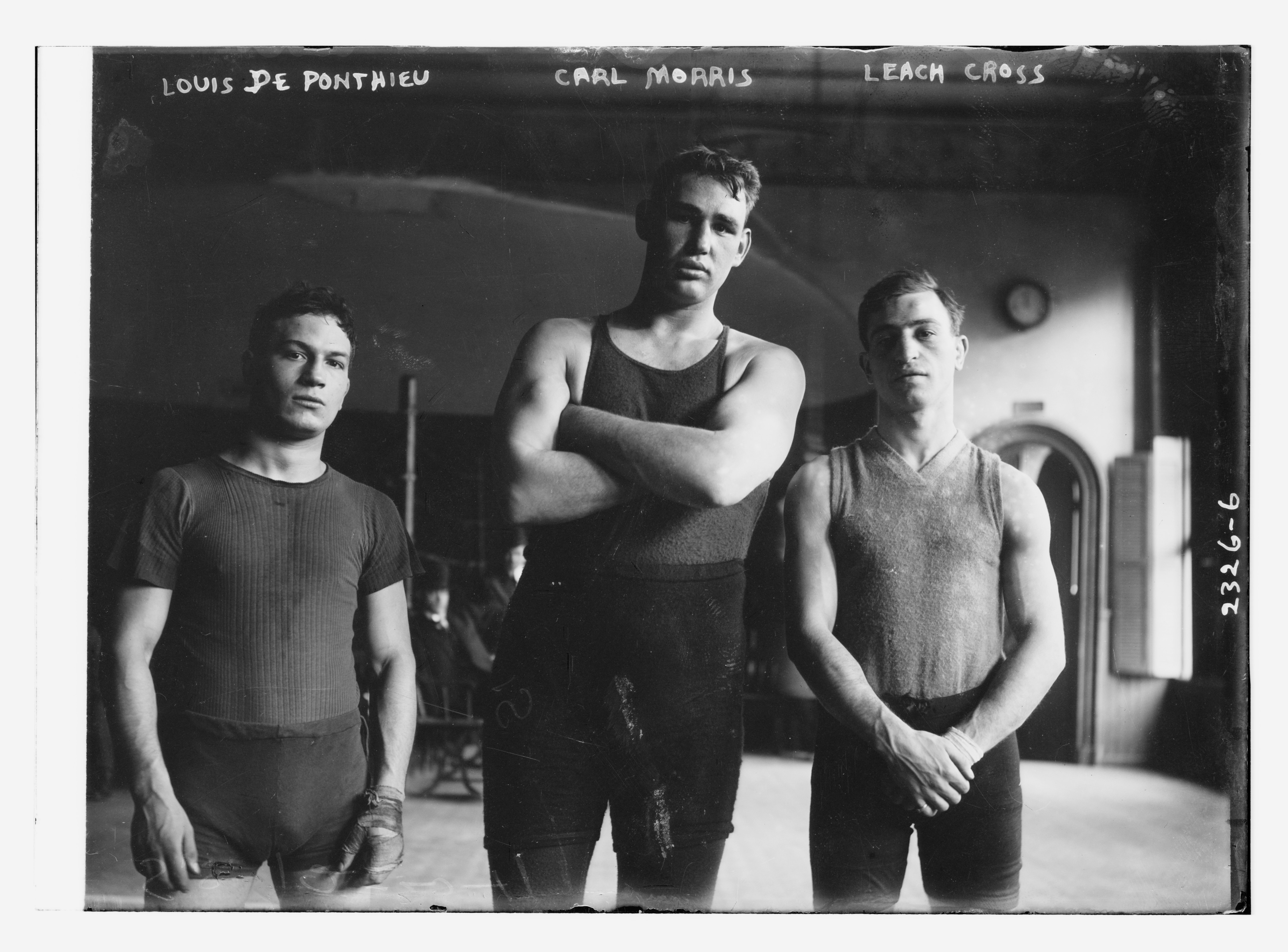
Louis De Ponthieu; Carl Morris; and Leach Cross

Carl E. Morris (February 23, 1887 – July 11, 1951) was a professional boxer who was known as the Oklahoma Giant, the Sapulpa Giant and the Oklahoma White Hope. He was a heavyweight fighting at 225–240 pounds. He was 6 feet 4 inches tall.

== Biography ==
Born on February 23, 1887, in Fulton, Kentucky. Carl Morris was a locomotive engineer prior to boxing. Despite being known as "the Oklahoma White Hope" Morris was part Cherokee.

Morris began his career 7–0 with 7 knockouts, including a huge win against former heavyweight champion Marvin Hart. Like many white heavyweights in the era he was dubbed a white hope. Morris went to the final bell with Fireman Jim Flynn and lost by newspaper decision. After draw with Jim Stewart, Morris lost the rematch, which caused The New York Times to report "a white hope exploded." Morris was knocked out for the first time against Luther McCarty. He fought Jack Dempsey 3 times.

In later life he worked as a steam shovel operator. He died on July 11, 1951, in Pasadena, California, of cancer.
