= Noel "Boy" McCormick =

British boxer (1899–1939)

Boy McCormick
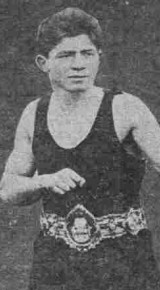
- McCormick, c. 1919

Personal information
- Nationality: British/Irish
- Born: Noel Hugh McCormick; 25 December 1899 India
- Died: 22 January 1939 (aged 39) Newton Heath, Manchester
- Weight: Light heavyweight, heavyweight

Boxing career

Boxing record
- Total fights: 48
- Wins: 31
- Win by KO: 11
- Losses: 11
- Draws: 6

Noel Hugh "Boy" McCormick (25 December 1899 – 22 January 1939) was a British boxer who won the British light heavyweight title in 1919, holding the title until 1922.

== Career ==
Born in India, and of Irish descent, McCormick was based in Salford. He joined the British Army in 1914 as a band boy, with the title of "Boy" sticking with him throughout his career. While in the army he began boxing and met world flyweight champion Jimmy Wilde who was serving as a drill instructor.

He had his first professional fight in 1916, and after a string of victories in 1918 he got a shot at the British light heavyweight title vacated by Dick Smith in April 1919. He won the title after his opponent Harold Rolph was disqualified in the 15th round. He travelled to the United States where he had 15 unbeaten fights during 1919/1920, winning 11 and drawing four, his opponents including Gunboat Smith and Battling Levinsky.

He returned to England and challenged Joe Beckett for the British heavyweight title in September 1921; Beckett won by a 12th-round TKO in a fight at the Royal Opera House, Covent Garden attended by Charlie Chaplin who had reserved three boxes for his party. He then fought Ted "Kid" Lewis in a non-title fight at the Royal Albert Hall in November, with Lewis winning by a TKO in the 14th round after knocking one of McCormick's teeth out and opening a cut over his eye. He relinquished the British light heavyweight title voluntarily in 1922.

It was almost two years before McCormick challenged for another title, this time the vacant Irish light heavyweight title, losing to Dave Magill in Liverpool after retiring in the tenth round.

In December 1923 he was convicted, along with three other men, of indecent assault against two women, and received a 12-month prison sentence.

He beat former British champion Harry Reeve twice in the space of a month in December 1924/January 1925. In the spring of 1925 he travelled to Canada, where he drew with Jack McClelland before another series of fights in the United States; After losses to Maxie Rosenbloom and Jimmy Slattery he returned to England, where he fought Phil Scott in April 1926 for the latter's British heavyweight title; McCormick retired in the tenth round.

He married and had a child, but his wife divorced him in 1927. In February 1928 he was bound over for six months after being convicted of assaulting Albert Lord, one of his wife's co-workers whom he suspected of having an affair with his wife.

After four years out of the ring he returned in August 1930 to fight Tom Berry, losing to a 9th round knockout. This proved to be his final fight. McCormick claimed that throughout his career he was never knocked out, and claimed damages in 1938 after an article in The People which was reproduced in the book Giants on Parade implied that he had been knocked out by Jimmy Wilde in their early sparring encounter before McCormick turned professional. He won the case and was awarded £1,050 damages.

After retiring from boxing he found work as a travelling salesman and boxing instructor, also acting as a referee in several bouts. He later became licensee of a hotel in Oldham Road, Manchester.

Noel McCormick died on 22 January 1939 from heart failure, and was found dead in his car in Newton Heath, Manchester.

== See also ==
- List of British light-heavyweight boxing champions
