= Jack Moran (boxer) =

American boxer (1894–1966)

Personal information
- Nationality: American
- Born: John Ralph Cizek; July 4, 1894
- Died: November 4, 1966 (aged 72)
- Weight: Heavyweight, light heavyweight

Boxing career

Jack Moran (July 4, 1894 – November 4, 1966) was an American professional boxer from 1911–1922. At birth, his last name was Cizek, which he changed to Moran for promotional reasons. He fought for the world light heavyweight boxing title.

== Career ==
In January 1917 he took a newspaper decision over Jack Geyer. In his next bout he fought a draw with Gunboat Smith. In March 1917 he faced Battling Levinsky, losing on points in a fight for the world light heavyweight title.

In March 1917 he was stopped in the third round by Jack Dillon, and in September 1918 was knocked pout in the first round by Jack Dempsey in Reno. Despite never winning again, he continued to fight until 1922, with a brief comeback in 1931.

He later worked as a boxing referee.

Moran died on November 4, 1966, aged 72.

In the 29 bouts listed by Boxrec.com, he:

- Newspaper decisions won 2 + lost 5 + drawn 1 = 8
  - rounds boxed 74
- Won 2 (KO 1) + lost 17 (KO 15) + drawn 2 = 21
  - rounds boxed 102

=== Opponents ===
Notable boxers he fought included:

- Archie Moore
- Battling Levinsky
- Billy Miske
- Bob Martin
- Carl E. Morris
- Fred Fulton
- Gunboat Smith
- Jack Burke
- Jack Dempsey
- Jack Dillon
