= Leo P. Flynn =

American boxing manager (1880–1930)

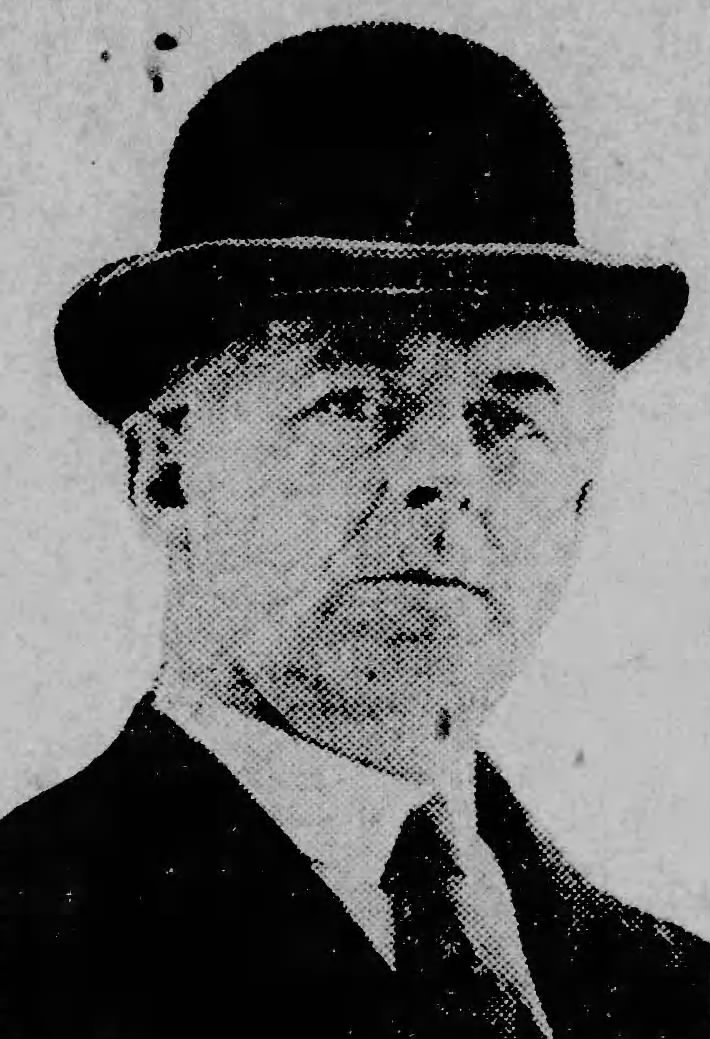
- Born: Leo Parnell Flynn; June 1, 1880; Providence, Rhode Island, U.S.
- Died: May 19, 1930 (aged 49); The Bronx, New York, U.S.
- Other names: Carpet Bagger of Fistiana; Silver Fox
- Occupation: Boxing manager

Leo P. Flynn (June 1, 1880 – May 19, 1930) was an American boxing manager and matchmaker.

== Early life ==
Leo Parnell Flynn was born in Providence, Rhode Island, United States, on June 1, 1880.

In Providence, he had been an apprentice to a jeweler and a bricklayer before becoming an amateur boxer. After driving horses for Frank Slavin, the local liveryman, he was dismissed for partaking in a street race on Providence's Broad Street. When the Tuxedo Athletic Club formed in Slavin's barn on Atwell's Avenue in 1897, Flynn began boxing there, coming up through Providence's barn-loft circuit. He boxed as a lightweight.

Before leaving New England, he had become the champion cakewalker of Rhode Island and earned a reputation as a first-class pool player.

At 19, he moved to New York City with his wife, Catherine Conley. When they moved, their total possessions included his carpet bag and 25 cents from his wife, which he turned into $20 as a pool shark at the old Polo Athletic Club.

== Career ==
When Flynn established his home on East 14th Street in New York, American boxing manager Pete Stone recommended him his first fighter, Young Britt, who had come from Pittsburgh around 1906.

He first came to notice in the boxing world managing K.O. Sweeney and Johnny "Kid" Alberts. He was often on the road with his fighters prior to World War I.

Flynn discovered Bill Brennan boxing as Bill Shanks in Chicago in 1914. After persuading his manager to sell his contract, he had him adopt the name Brennan and developed him in New York, where he first fought Eli Stanton in 1915.

He introduced Panama Joe Gans to New York's boxing scene in 1917.

When Tex Rickard began to promote fights at Madison Square Garden in 1920, he offered Flynn the matchmaker's position. The opportunity came immediately after the passage of the Walker Law. Flynn supposedly accepted the position without salary, yet backlash followed when 18 of his fighters quickly filled main events and only one won. The New York State Athletic Commission ruled out his dual capacity, and he departed the Garden.

He persuaded Jack Dempsey's longtime manager, Jack Kearns, to match the Manassa Mauler with his fighter, Bill Brennan, which took place on December 14, 1920, at the old Madison Square Garden. The fight drew $178,000.

After Dempsey ended his relationship with Kearns in 1926, Flynn stepped in as his advisor. As advisor and trainer, he worked with Dempsey in 1927 for fights against Jack Sharkey in New York and a rematch with Gene Tunney in Chicago. Dempsey nicknamed the grey-haired man the "old silver fox."

By 1928, his roster featured Jack Dempsey, Jack Renault, Tiger Payne, Clayton "Big Boy" Peterson, Bud Gorman, George Manley, Dave Shade, Babe McCorgary, Allentown Joe Gans, Osk Till, Charlie Arthurs, Erwin Bige, Lou Paluso, Tommy 'Kid' Murphy, Emil Paluso, Newsboy Brown, Sammy Shack, and Pinky May. He also managed Kid Norfolk, Bill Brennan, and Al McCoy.

Later in life, he pursued golf alongside his expertise in billiards.

== Death ==
Flynn, already sick, still showed up for a 1930 golf appointment at Van Cortlandt Park with a rich prospect he had groomed. Ignoring his wife's advice, he played in the damp conditions, won big, and contracted pneumonia. He was kept alive on oxygen for two days, and Flynn drifted in and out of a coma. Leo P. Flynn died in the Bronx, New York, United States, on May 19, 1930. At the news of his death, Jack Dempsey said, "Leo was a good pal and one of the keenest boxing men I knew. He probably would have acted as my manager again had I decided to attempt a comeback."

== Legacy ==
American sportswriter Damon Runyon coined Flynn's nickname "The Carpetbagger."

He became the first boxing manager to own a Rolls-Royce, and one of his fighters typically drove it for him.

After 24 years in the sport's business, he left an estimated $500,000 estate and rumors of a safe stuffed with $200,000 in $1,000 notes and diamonds. He is said to have had the largest fighter roster of any American manager, and his boxers frequently worked with boxing trainer Ray Arcel. His stable of fighters reportedly totalled 64 at its peak, according to Pete Stone. A long-told story claims that on one night 17 of his fighters appeared in bouts around the country, and only one won. Flynn's motto was "Get 'em killed, or make 'em rich". Although he had been in the business for close to 30 years, he never managed an active world champion.
