= Fred Fulton =

American boxer (1891–1973)

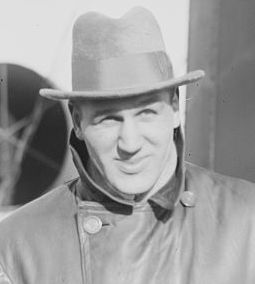
- Fulton c. 1920

Personal information
- Nickname: The Rochester Plasterer
- Born: Fred Tobias Fulton; April 18, 1891 Blue Rapids, Kansas, U.S.
- Died: July 7, 1973 (age 82) Park Rapids, Minnesota, U.S.
- Height: 6 ft 4 1/2 in (194 cm)

Boxing career
- Reach: 84 1/2 in (215 cm)

Boxing record
- Total fights: 114
- Wins: 77
- Win by KO: 68
- Losses: 18
- Draws: 2

Fred Tobias Fulton - nicknamed "The Rochester Plasterer" and the "Giant of the North" (April 18, 1891 – July 7, 1973) was an American professional boxer who competed from 1913 to 1933. Fulton was inducted into the Minnesota Boxing Hall of Fame in 2018.

== Biography ==
He was born in Blue Rapids, Kansas on April 19, 1891.

Fulton made his professional debut in 1913 and did not retire from boxing until 1933. His final record was 83 wins (72 by KO), 17 losses, and 4 draws. In 2003 he was named to Ring magazine's'list of 100 greatest punchers of all time.

From 1915 to 1917, Fulton won 17 consecutive matches (14 by KO) including stopping Charley Weinert, Terry Kellar, and Arthur Pelkey. As his win streak grew, Fulton was more frequently mentioned by the press as a worthy Heavyweight title contender. Fulton got the chance to face off against the Heavyweight Champion Jess Willard in an exhibition match on May 14, 1915, in Rochester, Minnesota. Fulton was described by witnesses as having led the pace before scoring a knockdown, a feat never accomplished before against Willard. This incident prompted Jess to avoid even considering defending the title against Fulton for the remainder of his reign. The Day Book reported Fulton having an arm span of 84.5 inches, exceeding Willard's 83.5 inches, suggesting Fulton had the reach advantage despite Willard being the tallest heavyweight champion (6 feet 7 inches) in history up to that point. The bout almost came to pass in March of 1916 when Fulton's manager, Mike Collins, arranged a fight against Jess Willard in New Orleans. However, promoters led by the Willard Camp backed out, saying Fulton was not the drawing card they needed, quietly replacing him with Frank Moran.

Fulton's first win streak ended in a rematch against Carl Morris. With Fulton fouling on purpose to end the fight. In a rematch with Carl Morris, a mirror opposite their last encounter, Morris was disqualified for repeated headbutting even after being warned by the referee. The consecutive disqualification victories between the two boxers suggest a fixed outcome. By the end of 1917, Fred Fulton added knockout wins against Sam Langford and Gunboat Smith, solidifying his position as the number one contender.

Fulton's dreams of obtaining a title fight were hastened when he was brutally KO'd by future heavyweight champion Jack Dempsey in 18.6 seconds of the first round on July 27, 1918. After the crushing loss, Fulton made a series of unfounded claims to the media of an agreed fix between Dempsey and himself that Dempsey broke. From then until July 1920, Fulton would win 19 consecutive bouts, including stoppages, over such contenders as John Lester Johnson, Frank Moran, Jack Thompson, and Willie Meehan. His knockout streak was ended by Harry Wills in the third round on July 26, 1920.

Past his best but undeterred, Fulton racked up 15 more victories and two draws over the next two years, including another stoppage victory over longtime rival Carl Morris. This final winning period of his career was ended by Billy Miske, who knocked Fulton out in the third round with a left hook to the jaw. Fulton's boxing ability continued to show a rapid decline as he lost or drew in over half of his remaining fights, including several against rising top contenders such as Floyd Johnson, George Godfrey, and Jack Renault.

At the time of his retirement, Fulton had compiled a professional record of 80–15–2, with 72 wins coming by knockout.

He died in Park Rapids, Minnesota on July 7, 1973.
