= Bill Brennan (boxer) =

American boxer (1893–1924)

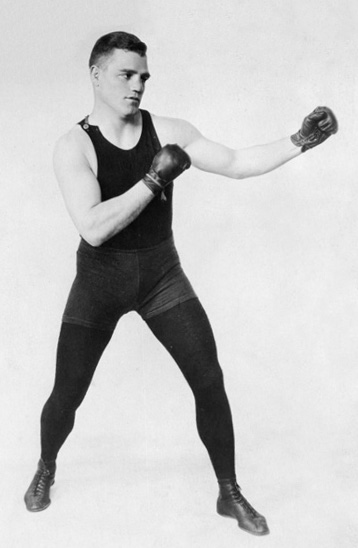
- Brennan in 1921

Personal information
- Nicknames: K.O. Bill Brennan; Battling Bill the Bartender
- Nationality: American
- Born: Wilhelm Schenck; June 23, 1893 Louisville, Kentucky
- Died: June 15, 1924 (aged 30) New York City
- Height: 6 ft 1 in (1.85 m)
- Weight: Heavyweight

Boxing career

Boxing record
- Total fights: 103
- Wins: 77
- Win by KO: 49
- Losses: 18
- Draws: 8
- No contests: 0

Bill Brennan (June 23, 1893 – June 15, 1924) was an American boxer who fought and lost to World Heavyweight Champion Jack Dempsey in a well attended title fight that ended in a twelfth-round knockout on December 14, 1920, in Madison Square Garden. He lost to Dempsey for the first time in a non-title fight on February 5, 1918, in Milwaukee, Wisconsin, in a sixth-round technical knockout.

He began fighting under the name Bill Shanks, close to his actual name, and knocked out 11 of his first 12 opponents, fighting in the Midwest and then the New York City area. He had a strong punch and a very good knockout percentage. Brennan's manager was Leo P. Flynn and his trainers included Dia Dollings and Frank Cline.

== Early life and career ==
Brennan was born on June 23, 1893, in Louisville, Kentucky. Though many sources of his time stated he was born in County Mayo, Ireland or Chicago, these are fabrications he perpetuated to bolster the myth of his Irish ancestry. He was, in fact, of Scots-Irish, English, Irish, and German ancestry. He did live in the Chicago area during his early boxing career before moving to Manhattan where the boxing was more lucrative, and there were still plenty of Irish fans who would flock to see who they assumed was a native son.

Between May 1913 through May 1916 Brennan started professional boxing primarily in the New York area. With a powerful punch, he won an impressive 11 of his first fifteen fights by knockout losing only once in his first bout in Wisconsin. Brennan worked as a bartender between fights, earning him the nickname "Battling Bill the Bartender".

According to one source, Brennan achieved a third-round knockout of Jack Cameron in 1914, and two ten-round newspaper decisions from Marty Cutler on April 13 and July 2, 1914, in Aurora, Illinois. Cutler fought some talented opposition in his career including Jack Johnson, Sam Langford, and Jack Dillon, though his record was poor.

=== Highlights of early career knockouts and wins, 1916 ===
On January 22, 1916, he knocked out 6' 1" heavyweight George Rodel in the seventh round at the Clermont Rink in Brooklyn. On March 20, 1916, Brennan knocked out Brooklyn-born Italian boxer Al Benedict in the second round at the Military Athletic Club in Brooklyn, New York. Both were important wins that brought him recognition in his early career.

On May 1, 1916, Brennan achieved a second-round knockout of 6 foot, Buffalo native George "One Round" Davis, a competent heavyweight, in Rochester, New York. On May 4, 1916, he TKO'd Rodel in the third round at the same location.

On May 16, 1916, Brennan achieved a sixth-round technical knockout of Al Williams at the Pioneer Sporting Club in New York City.

On May 23, 1916, he knocked out Tony Ross in the eighth round. Ross would meet some of the greatest heavyweights of his day, including a heavyweight title bout with Black boxing great Jack Johnson on June 30, 1919.

On May 24, 1916, Brennan fought Andre Anderson to a twelve-round draw on points in Thornton, Rhode Island.

On July 1, 1916, he knocked out Alfred "Soldier" Kearns in the eighth round at the Averne Athletic Club in Queens, New York. Kearns was considered a strong puncher though Brennan possessed a two-inch advantage in reach.

On July 15, 1916, he defeated Joe Cox in a ten-round newspaper decision of the Brooklyn Daily Eagle at the Broadway Arena in Brooklyn, New York. He beat Cox again on January 29, 1917, at Rochester, New York in a ten-round newspaper decision of the Rochester Herald.

On July 21, 1916, he knocked out Jack Hubbard in the third round at the Flower City Athletic Club in Rochester, New York. He knocked out Hubbard in the second round on January 6, 1917, at the Broadway Sports Club in Brooklyn, New York. According to one source Brennan had previously defeated Hubbard in a fourteenth-round knockout in 1914, while Hubbard was boxing as "Jumbo Wells".

On October 26, 1916, he knocked out Tim Logan in a second-round TKO at the Manhattan Casino in New York City.

On December 30, 1916, Brennan defeated Jack Keating in a third round Technical Knockout at Queensboro Athletic Club in Long Island City, in Queens, New York.

=== Highlights of early career knockouts and wins, 1917 ===
On June 9, 1917, Brennan knocked out Sailor Jack Carroll in the second round at the Pioneer Sporting Club in New York. Brennan dropped Carroll with a right to the jaw in the first minute of the second round. Carroll had been substituting for another boxer. Though not having a stellar record, Carroll met some top talent during his career, including Gunboat Smith and two bouts with Battling Levinsky. Carroll lost to Levinsky on March 9, 1916, in New London, Connecticut, in a match promoted by Jewish boxer Abe Hollandersky.

On June 12, and July 20, 1917, Brennan achieved two tenth-round newspaper wins at first the Broadway and then the Harlem Sports Clubs against Bob Devere in New York City. In their June 12 bout, Brennan took a nine count in the sixth round, though the fighting was close. In the remaining three rounds of the bout, Brennan had Devere groggy. In their July 20 bout, Brennan was described as being on the aggressive throughout and carrying the fight the entire way. On March 30, 1920, Brennan won a ten-round newspaper decision from the Chicago Tribune over Devere in Chicago, Illinois. The battle was hard-fought, with Devere cut over the left eye in the seventh, and showing fatigue by the finish.

On July 3, 1917, Brennan knocked out Soldier Jones in a second-round technical knockout at the Grande Alle Rink in Quebec City, Quebec.

On November 1, 1917, Brennan first defeated Joe Bonds at the Unity Cycle Club in Lawrence, Massachusetts, in a second-round knockout. On April 28, 1917, he defeated Bonds again at the Broadway Sporting Club in Brooklyn, New York, in a ten-round newspaper decision. On December 20, 1918, Brennan achieved a newspaper decision third-round TKO against Bonds by the Syracuse Herald at the Arena in Syracuse, New York.

On November 9, 1917, Brennan drew with 6' 3" New York heavyweight Jim Coffey by newspaper decision in ten rounds at the Harlem Sports Club. The Buffalo Courier gave each four rounds with two even. Brennan connected with a wicked right to the jaw that nearly dropped Coffey in the third, but the fighting was give and take in most rounds. Coffey took considerable punishment in the bout but was never dropped to the mat.

=== Bouts with Battling Levinsky, 1917–18 ===
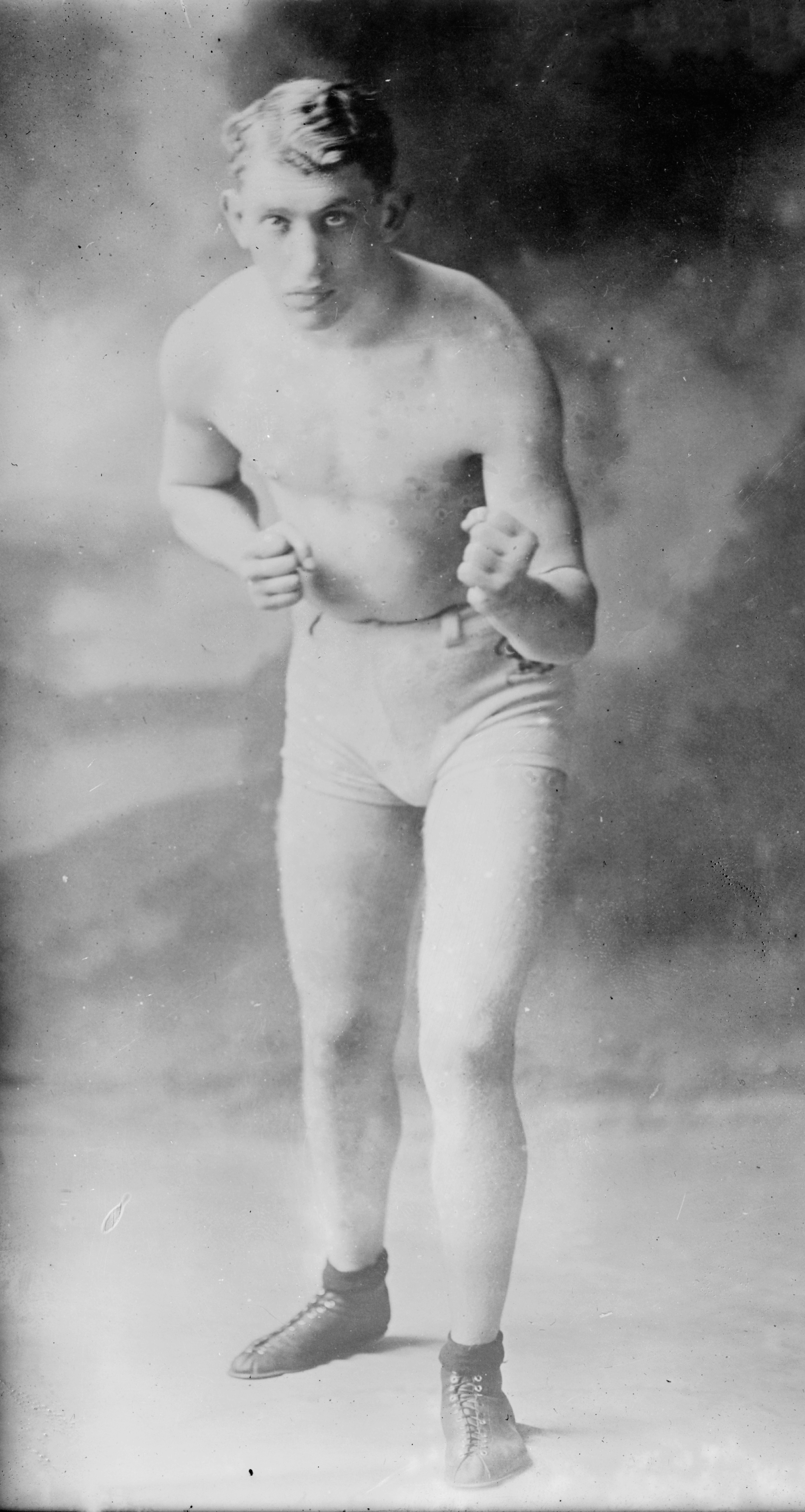
Battling Levinsky

Brennan fought 1916–20 World Light Heavyweight Champion Battling Levinsky three times in 1917, on October 2 and 23 at the Armory in Boston, to a twelve-round draw and a twelve-round points decision. He had a rare loss to Levinsky on November 27, 1917, in a twelve-round points decision in Boston, before a twelve-round pre-agreed draw on points at the Grand Opera House in Boston on January 5, 1918. The spectators would not have been pleased had they known the draw was pre-arranged. Levinsky held the World Light Heavyweight Championship at the time, though none of his bouts with Brennan were title matches.

On December 1, 1919, Brennan knocked out five foot eleven inch Irish boxer Tom "Bearcat" McMahon in the second of fifteen rounds at Heinemann Park in New Orleans. The New Orleans Times-Picayune suspected McMahon may have had such a difficult time in the first round that he chose to take the count in the second rather than face any more rounds with Brennan. Brennan fought a ten-round newspaper decision draw with McMahon in LaSalle, Illinois on June 18, 1918. On November 5, 1917, Brennan won a ten-round newspaper decision of the Rochester Herald in Rochester, New York. McMahon was a good, though not great boxer from Brennan's era.

== Four important bouts with 1923 World Middleweight Champion Harry Greb, 1919 ==
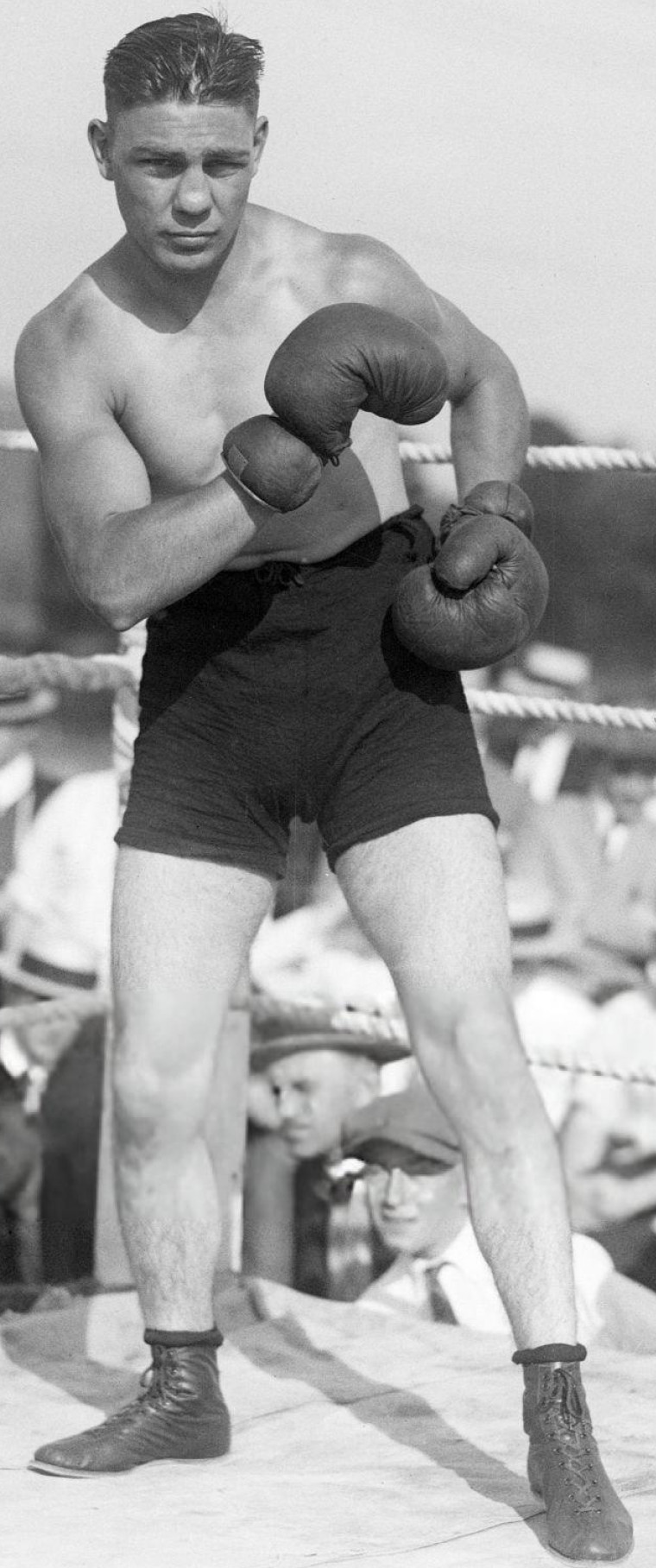
World Middleweight Champion Harry Greb

One of his toughest and best known opponents, Brennan fought Harry Greb four times in 1919, losing three bouts by newspaper decisions, and one on points.

The two first met on February 10, 1919, at the Arena in Syracuse, New York, with Greb winning in a ten-round newspaper decision. The Syracuse Herald gave Greb every one of the ten rounds. As was typical of Greb's style, he took the lead and attacked Brennan with a flurry of lefts and rights to both head and body in the first few rounds. Brennan fought solidly back for the first four rounds, but then tired and Greb took over. The first two rounds were slow, the next four were give and take, but the final four were dominated by Greb. On March 17, 1919, Greb won by newspaper decision again in a ten-round bout in Duquesne Garden in Pittsburgh, Pennsylvania. Greb took the bout with a "quickness, speed, and busy style" that were too much for Brennan, though Brennan fought back and did not resort to a defensive shell. Brennan landed his best punch in round ten, which only seemed to rile Greb, and make him more aggressive. On July 4, 1919, Greb met Brennan at Convention Hall in Tulsa, Oklahoma, and won the bout in a fifteen-round points decision. The Tulsa World wrote that Greb won seven rounds, Brennan winning only the fourth round, with seven rounds even. Once again, Greb won the final rounds as Brennan tired.

On August 23, 1919, Greb defeated Brennan in a ten-round newspaper decision at Forbes Field in Pittsburgh. The Washington Post wrote that Greb outfought Brennan in every round, though the Pittsburgh Post gave Greb six rounds, Brennan two, and two were even. The fight was in the afternoon under a hot sun which seemed to slow Greb. Greb won the late rounds as Brennan tired. Greb was outweighed by twenty pounds, and gave away five inches in height. He was the better boxer, however, and became the American Light Heavyweight Champion in 1922. Brennan was bleeding from the nose in every round, and his left eye was cut in the tenth.

On April 23, 1920, Brennan knocked out Walter "Farmer" Lodge, also known as "Soldier" Lodge in the third round at the Moose Club in Detroit, Michigan. Brennan was dropped for a count of four in the first round which excited the audience. Lodge was described as being 6' 4", one of Brennan's few opponents who would have had a reach advantage. In a subsequent round Lodge was down and out for "a full ten minutes".

=== Bouts with future Hall of Famer Billy Miske, 1919–21 ===
Brennan fought future Hall of Famer Billy Miske twice in 1919, once on June 28 in Oklahoma to a fifteen-round loss on points, and on April 28 at Cardinal Field in St. Louis to an eight-round newspaper decision draw. He lost to Miske again on June 8, 1921, at the Auditorium in St. Paul on a ten-round newspaper decision. According to the Decatur Daily Review, Miske took five rounds, Brennan two, and three were even. There was no dishonor in losing to a boxer as exceptional as Billy Miske. Miske, who also faced Dempsey in his career.

== Bouts with Jack Dempsey, 1918–1920 ==
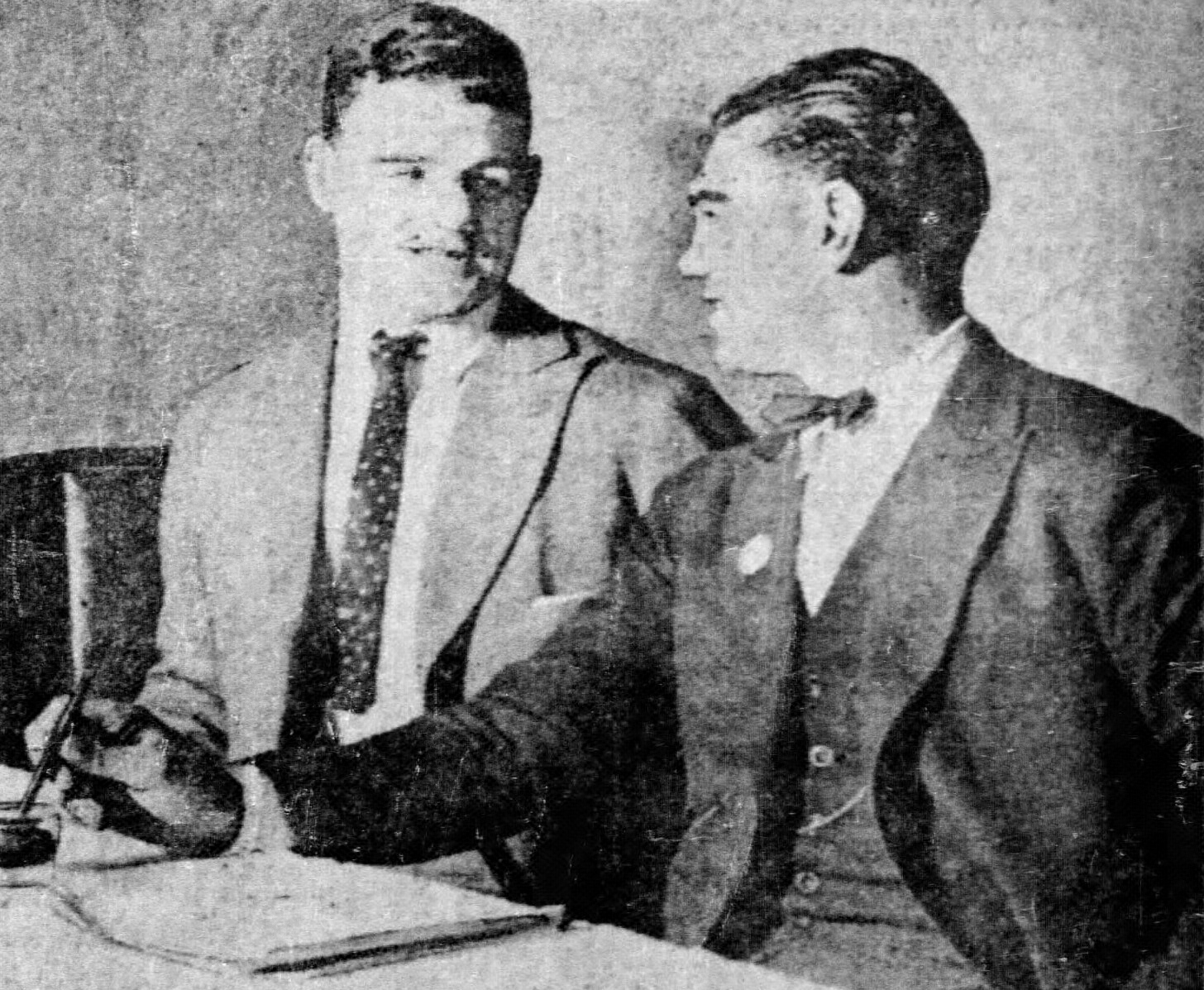
Brennan (left) with Dempsey circa 1922

Brennan first lost to Jack Dempsey in a non-title fight on February 25, 1918, in Milwaukee, Wisconsin, in a sixth-round technical knockout. He was down five times in the bout, suffering at the hands of Dempsey. Four of the knockdowns came in the second round. Brennan in his last knockdown fell with such force to the canvas that he twisted his leg and broke an ankle. He tried to rise, but the referee stopped the bout to prevent a knockout of Brennan.

=== Heavyweight championship bout with Dempsey, December 1920 ===
Appearing to be in better condition than he was in their first meeting, for the first nine rounds of the Dempsey title fight on December 14, 1920, in boxing's greatest venue, Madison Square Garden, Brennan held his own against the Champion. He even stunned Dempsey with a right uppercut to the jaw in the second round. Finally in the twelfth round, however, Brennan was doubled over by a right hook below the heart, and then floored by a subsequent left hook to his right side. Dempsey was never one to miss an opportunity to finish an opponent, and the left hook that put Brennan down for the count was the best punch in his arsenal. The St. Louis Post-Dispatch wrote that Dempsey "was forced to his utmost to hold off a courageous, determined fighter who gave almost as good as he received." Dempsey's most noticeable injuries were a split left ear and a lighter blow to the mouth which both bled at times during the bout. Famed sportswriter Grantland Rice wrote that Dempsey's ear looked like "a cross between a veal cutlet and a bloodly sponge", as Brennan had targeted it in the fight. The challenger received around $35,000 for the bout, though Dempsey took home substantially more. More fans would have attended the bout had they known the fight would last twelve rounds, and that Brennan would hold off Dempsey as long as he did. One source noted that Dempsey was "Brennan's master in every stage". However, the New York Times reminded their audience the bout was "one of the most vicious and closely-contested fights in history." and it occurred before a sellout crowd of nearly 17,000

On February 18, 1921, Brennan defeated Bob Martin in a fifteen-round points decision at Madison Square Garden. Taking the lead after the more evenly paced first eight rounds, Brennan used his left repeatedly to Martin's face, and gained an advantage in the last seven rounds, particularly the twelfth through fifteenth. Brennan was an American Expeditionary Forces Champion and Ohio State Heavyweight Champion. There were no knockdowns in the bout which some critics considered tame. On July 4, 1922, he fought a twelve-round, no-decision bout with Martin in Ashland, Kentucky. Brennan showed greater speed than Martin, and had an advantage throughout the bout.

On March 31, 1921, a few sources have Brennan losing to talented Black boxer Jeff Clark in Atlantic City, New Jersey. Clark would fight some of the greatest Black boxers of his era including Kid Norfolk, Sam McVea, Harry Wills, and Sam Langford. Clark had taken the Panamanian Heavyweight Title in Panama City, Panama, defeating Kid Norfolk on May 16, 1915, and had taken the Mexican Heavyweight title earlier.

On May 16, 1922, he knocked out Jim Tracey in an eighth-round TKO at New York's Madison Square Garden. In his career, Tracey would attempt the Mexican Heavyweight Title in July 1923.

== Difficult losses to Floyd Johnson and Luis Ángel Firpo, January – March 1923 ==
On January 12, 1923, he lost decisively to talented heavyweight Floyd Johnson of Iowa in a fifteen-round points decision at Madison Square Garden. Johnson was described as being the aggressor and both out fighting and outboxing Brennan throughout the bout. Brennan, who was a ring weary twenty-nine at the time of the bout, to Johnson's twenty-three was in serious distress in the twelfth and fifteenth rounds. In the twelfth, Brennan received a series of lefts and rights to the head. In the fifteenth, Brennan took a number of additional blows to the head which forced him to clinch at times. Johnson fought several of the most talented boxers of his era including heavyweights Jack Johnson, Jack Renault, Jack Sharkey, and Kid Norfolk. Johnson was said to have exhibited exceptional boxing prowess and form in his win over Brennan. Brennan was so overwhelmed with the attack of Johnson, he was unable to wage an effective offensive against his opponent.

Brennan fought Luis Ángel Firpo only once, on March 12, 1923, at Madison Square Garden, losing badly in an important twelfth-round knockout. He was felled by a right behind the ear, and was treated for a concussion that evening, but considered out of danger. The telling blow to his head was preceded by a flurry of crushing right and left uppercuts from Firpo. Brennan was not released from the hospital till around March 21, and it was intimated at the time that he or his handlers were considering his permanent retirement from the ring. Oddly considering the brutal outcome of the fight, Firpo and Brennan met two weeks later on March 26, and made a short film of their boxing encounter for an Argentine movie company, where the film was widely shown.

His last well publicized bout was with Billy Miske on November 7, 1923. Brennan was reportedly out of shape and looking somewhat heavy. He was staggered by a left to the mouth from Miske in the third round and subsequently knocked down. In the fourth, a hard right to the jaw put Brennan down for the count. It is quite reasonable to assume he should have retired after the injuries he sustained from the Firpo fight eight months earlier.

== Early death by gang shooting in 1924 ==
On June 15, 1924, Brennan was shot to death by two "street thugs" in New York City. After Brennan opened a bar, Club Tia Juana, on 171st Street in the Washington Heights section of Manhattan, some rough looking men informed him that he was buying the wrong mob's beer. Brennan threw them out of his bar. He was later summoned outside by another man with whom he was unfamiliar and a gunman standing nearby pulled his gun, and shot him twice. James Cullen, a state trooper who had been chatting with Brennan earlier inside the club, was near Brennan at the time of the shooting and was shot as well. Both assailants were found to have police records, and one had connections to a gang. Three other men were present near the gunman, and suspected of being involved in the incident and also having connections to the "Hell's Kitchen" gang which had targeted Brennan. A few years prior to the shooting, Brennan had purchased the club with the winnings from his second Dempsey fight.

Survived by a wife and child, he was only 30 years old at the time of his death. On June 18, after 5,000 attended his Memorial service at New York's St. Rose de Lima Catholic Church, his funeral was held.
