= Jack Dempsey =

American boxer (1895–1983)

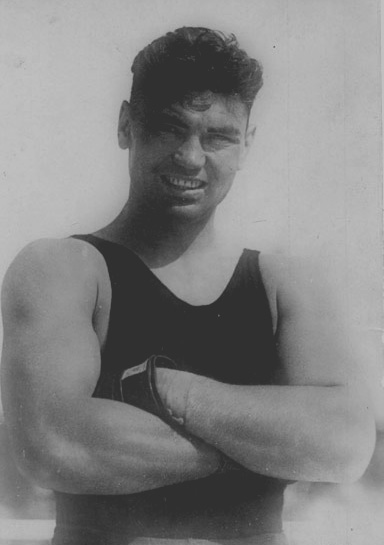
- Dempsey in 1920

Personal information
- Nicknames: Kid Blackie; The Manassa Mauler
- Born: William Harrison Dempsey; June 24, 1895 Manassa, Colorado, U.S.
- Died: May 31, 1983 (aged 87) New York City, U.S.
- Height: 6 ft 1 in (185 cm)
- Weight: Heavyweight

Boxing career
- Reach: 73 in (185 cm)
- Stance: Orthodox

Boxing record
- Total fights: 84
- Wins: 68
- Win by KO: 53
- Losses: 6
- Draws: 10

William Harrison "Jack" Dempsey (June 24, 1895 – May 31, 1983), nicknamed Kid Blackie and The Manassa Mauler, was an American boxer who competed from 1914 to 1927, and was world heavyweight champion from 1919 to 1926. He is ranked sixth on The Ring magazine's list of all-time heavyweights and fourth among its Top 100 Greatest Punchers, while in 1950 the Associated Press voted him as the greatest fighter of the past 50 years.

Dempsey was the inaugural winner of the Edward J. Neil Memorial Plaque in 1938, awarded by the Boxing Writers Association of Greater New York. Dempsey was an inaugural inductee of The Ring magazine Hall of Fame (1954), the World Boxing Hall of Fame (1980), and the International Boxing Hall of Fame (1990). Considered one of the most iconic athletes of his era, Dempsey generated boxing's first million-dollar gate in 1921 against Georges Carpentier ($1,789,238), surpassing his own 1919 record of $452,522.10 set versus Jess Willard. He later drew the sport's first two-million-dollar gate in his 1927 rematch with Gene Tunney.

== Early life and career ==
=== Early life and family background ===
Dempsey was born in Manassa, Colorado on June 24, 1895, to parents accustomed to living in poverty. One of 13 children to Mary Celia (née Smoot) and Hiram Dempsey, he was called Harry during his upbringing. The Dempsey family's lineage was a mix of Irish, Scottish and Jewish ancestry. Dempsey was baptized into the Church of Jesus Christ of Latter-day Saints, in 1903 following his eighth birthday, the "age of accountability", according to church doctrine.

=== Kid Blackie ===
Because his father had difficulty finding work, the family relocated often, moving to another part of Colorado and then to Utah. Dempsey dropped out of grade school to work and left home at the age of 16. As a hobo, Dempsey hopped freight trains across the country by hitching himself to the rods beneath the cars. He took on various short-term jobs, including ditch digging, fruit picking, timber cutting, and work as a circus roustabout. During this period, Dempsey would occasionally visit saloons in Colorado, Utah, and Nevada, and challenge for fights under the aliases "Kid Blackie" and "Young Dempsey", saying "I can't sing and I can't dance, but I can lick any SOB in the house." If anyone accepted the challenge, bets would be made. According to Dempsey's autobiography, he rarely lost these bar room brawls. For a short time, Dempsey was a part-time bodyguard for Thomas F. Kearns, president of The Salt Lake Tribune and son of Utah's U.S. Senator Thomas Kearns. Much of his early career is not recorded, and stated thus, in The Ring Record Book as compiled by Nat Fleischer.

=== Jack Dempsey ===
He first competed as "Jack Dempsey" (by his own recollection) in the fall of 1914, in Cripple Creek, Colorado. His brother, Bernie, who often fought under the pseudonym "Jack Dempsey"—this a common practice of the day, in fighters' admiration of middleweight boxer and former champion, Jack "Nonpareil" Dempsey—had signed to fight veteran George Copelin. Upon learning Copelin had sparred with then current world heavyweight champion Jack Johnson, and given Bernie Dempsey was nearing 40 years of age, he strategically decided to back out of the fight. He substituted his brother, still unknown in Eastern Colorado, as "Jack Dempsey". The fans at ringside immediately knew this was not the man they had paid to see.

The promoter became violently angry and "sailed into us, barehanded", threatening to stop the fight. Copelin himself, who outweighed Dempsey by 20 lbs. (165 to 145) upon seeing Dempsey's small stature in the ring, warned the promoter, "I might kill that skinny guy." The promoter reluctantly permitted the fight to commence, and in his first outing as "Jack Dempsey", the future champion downed Copelin six times in the first round and twice in the second. From there, it was a battle of attrition ("Neither Bernie nor I had taken into consideration the high altitude at Cripple Creek."), until a last knockdown of Copelin in the seventh moved the referee to make the then-unusual move of stopping the fight once Copelin regained his feet. According to Dempsey "In those days they didn't stop mining-town fights as long as one guy could move." This trial by fire carried with it a $100 purse. The promoter, angered at the switch pulled by the brothers, had laid no promised side bets, "... and even if I did, I wouldn't give you anything."

Following the name change, Dempsey won six bouts in a row by knockout before losing on a disqualification in four rounds to Jack Downey. During this early part of his career, Dempsey campaigned in Utah, frequently entering fights in towns in the Wasatch Mountain Range region. He followed his loss against Downey with a knockout win and two draws versus Johnny Sudenberg in Nevada. Three more wins and a draw followed when he met Downey again, this time resulting in a four-round draw. Following these wins, Dempsey racked up 10 more wins that included matches against Sudenberg and Downey, knocking out Downey in two rounds. These wins were followed with three no-decision matches, although at this point in the history of boxing, the use of judges to score a fight was often forbidden, so if a fight went the distance, it was called a draw or a no decision, depending on the state or county where the fight was held.

After the United States entered World War I in 1917, Dempsey worked in a shipyard and continued to box. Afterward, he was accused by some boxing fans of being a slacker for not enlisting. This remained a black mark on his reputation until 1920, when evidence produced showed he had registered with the U.S. Army, but been exempted due to hardship (having a dependent wife). (Note: According to Draft Card."World War I Draft Cards: Jack Dempsey". United States National Archives at Atlanta. August 15, 2016.) After the war, Dempsey spent two years in Salt Lake City, "bumming around" as he called it, before returning to the ring.

=== World heavyweight champion ===
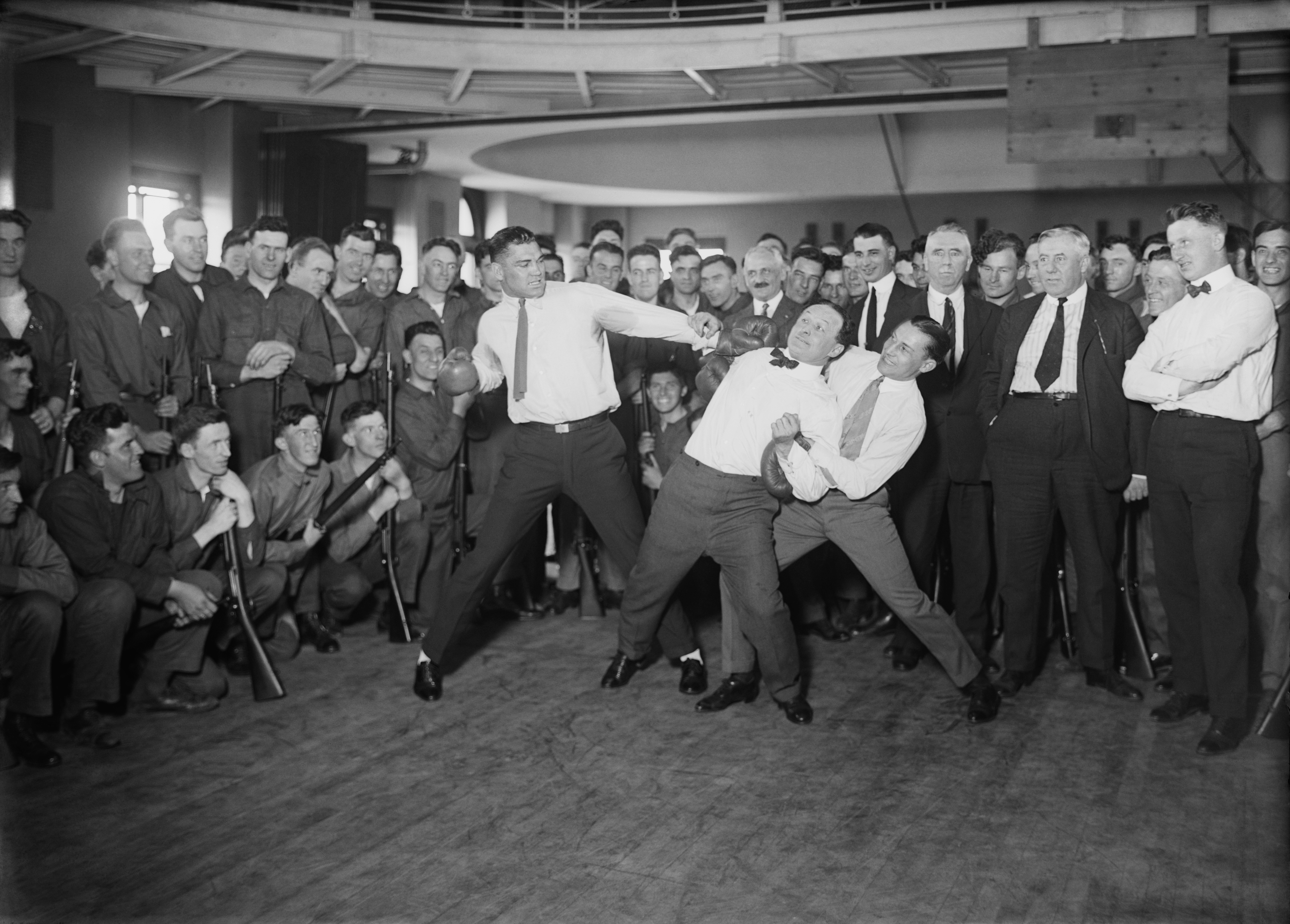
Dempsey mock punching Harry Houdini (held back by Benny Leonard)

Among his opponents as a rising contender were Fireman Jim Flynn, the only boxer ever to beat Dempsey by a knockout when Dempsey lost to him in the first round (although some boxing historians believe the fight was a "fix"), and Gunboat Smith, (who was a formerly highly ranked contender who had beaten both World Champion Jess Willard and Hall of Famer Sam Langford). Dempsey beat Smith for the third time on a second-round knockout. Dempsey had refused a match with Sam Langford in 1916. According to Dempsey: "I think Sam Langford was the greatest fighter we ever had."

Before he employed the long-experienced Jack Kearns as his manager, Dempsey was first managed by John J. Reisler.

One year later, in 1918, Dempsey fought in 17 matches, going 15–1 with one no-decision. One of those fights was with Flynn, who was knocked out by Dempsey, coincidentally, in the first round. Among other matches won that year were against Light Heavyweight Champion Battling Levinsky, Bill Brennan, Fred Fulton, Carl E. Morris, Billy Miske, heavyweight Lefty Jim McGettigan, and Homer Smith. In 1919, he won five consecutive regular bouts by knockout in the first round as well as a one-round special bout.

=== Title fight and controversy ===
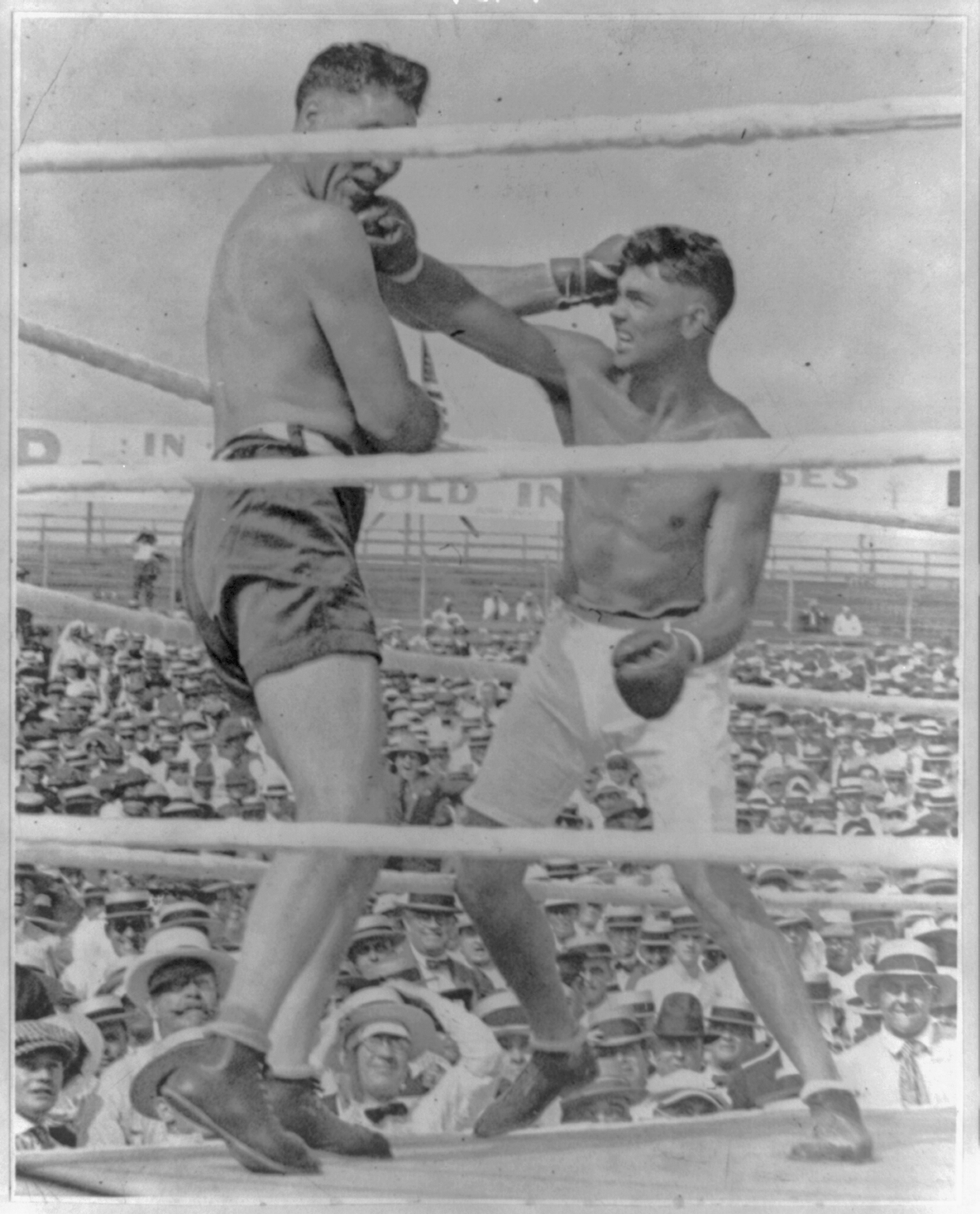
Dempsey (right) landing a right punch to the jaw of Jess Willard

On July 4, 1919, Dempsey and world heavyweight champion Jess Willard met at Toledo for the world title. Pro lightweight fighter Benny Leonard predicted a victory for the 6'1", 187-pound Dempsey even though Willard, known as the "Pottawatomie Giant", was 6'6 1/2" tall and 245 pounds. Ultimately, Willard was knocked down seven times by Dempsey in the first round.

Accounts of the fight reported that Willard suffered a broken jaw, broken ribs, several broken teeth, and a number of deep fractures to his facial bones. This aroused suspicion that Dempsey had cheated, with some questioning how the force capable of causing such damage had been transmitted through Dempsey's knuckles without fracturing them.

Other reports, however, failed to mention Willard suffered any real injuries. The New York Times' account of the fight described severe swelling visible on one side of Willard's face, but did not mention any broken bones. A still photograph of Willard following the fight appears to show discoloration and swelling on his face.

Following the match, Willard was quoted as saying, "Dempsey is a remarkable hitter. It was the first time that I had ever been knocked off my feet. I have sent many birds home in the same bruised condition that I am in, and now I know how they felt. I sincerely wish Dempsey all the luck possible and hope that he garnishes all the riches that comes with the championship. I have had my fling with the title. I was champion for four years and I assure you that they'll never have to give a benefit for me. I have invested the money I have made". Willard later said he had been defeated by "gangsterism".

After being fired by Dempsey, manager Jack Kearns gave an account of the fight in the January 20, 1964, issue of Sports Illustrated that has become known as the "loaded gloves theory". In the interview, Kearns said he had informed Dempsey he had wagered his share of the purse favoring a Dempsey win with a first-round knockout. Kearns further stated he had applied plaster of Paris to the wrappings on the fighter's hands.

Boxing historian J. J. Johnston said, "the films show Willard upon entering the ring walking over to Dempsey and examining his hands." That, along with an experiment conducted by a boxing magazine designed to re-enact the fight have been noted as proof that Kearns' story was false.

The Ring founder and editor Nat Fleischer said he had been present when Dempsey's hands were wrapped, stating, "Jack Dempsey had no loaded gloves, and no plaster of Paris over his bandages. I watched the proceedings and the only person who had anything to do with the taping of Jack's hands was Deforest. Kearns had nothing to do with it, so his plaster of Paris story is simply not true."

Deforest himself said that he regarded the stories of Dempsey's gloves being loaded as libel, calling them "trash", and said he did not apply any foreign substance to them, "which I can verify since I watched the taping." Sports writer Red Smith, in Dempsey's obituary published by The New York Times was openly dismissive of the claim.

Another rumor is that Dempsey used a knuckleduster during the first round. Some speculated that the object used was a rail spike. In the Los Angeles Times on July 3, 1979, Joe Stone, an ex-referee and boxing writer, asserted that in a film taken of the fight, an object on the canvas could be seen after the final knockdown. He further asserted that the object appears to be removed by someone from Dempsey's corner. In the same film, however, Dempsey can be seen at various times during the fight pushing and holding with Willard with the palm of the glove in question and holding on to the ropes with both hands, making it next to impossible that he had any foreign object embedded in his glove, and the object resembles a cigar.

Further controversy was fueled by the fact that Dempsey left the ring at the end of the first round, thinking the fight was over. This was seen as a violation of the rules. Willard's corner, however, did not ask for enforcement in order for the referee to disqualify Dempsey.

=== Title defenses ===
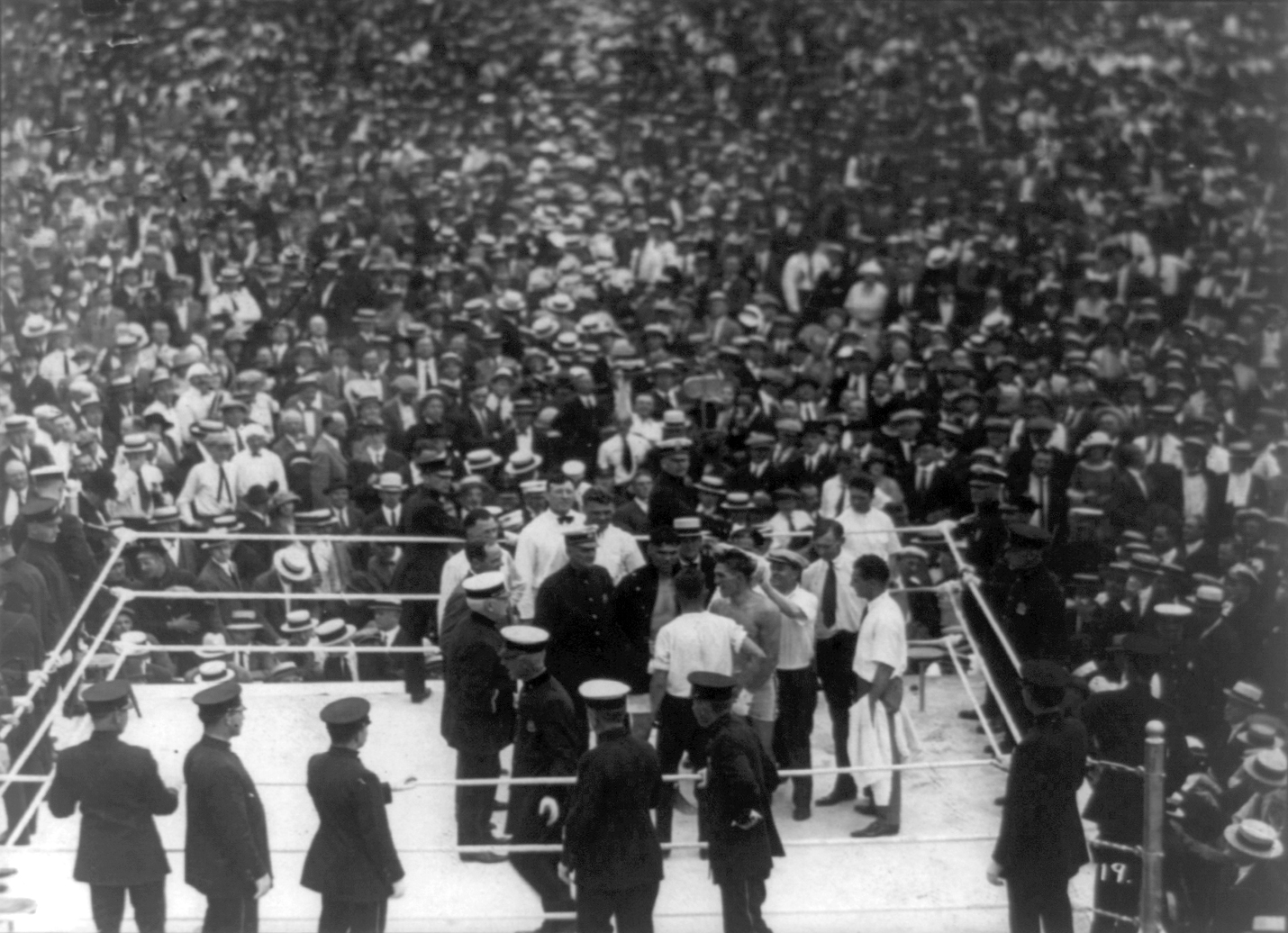
Dempsey and Carpentier in the arena before the fight

Following his victory, Dempsey traveled around the country, making publicity appearances with circuses, staging exhibitions, and appearing in a low-budget Hollywood movie. Dempsey did not defend his title until September 1920, with a fight against Billy Miske in Benton Harbor, Michigan. Miske was knocked out in three rounds.

Dempsey's second title defense was in December 1920 against Bill Brennan at Madison Square Garden, New York City. After 10 rounds, Brennan was ahead on points, and Dempsey's left ear was bleeding profusely. Dempsey rebounded to stop Brennan in the 12th round.

==== Jack Dempsey vs. Georges Carpentier ====
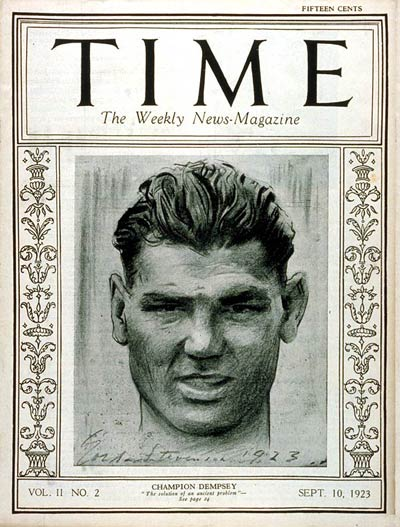
Time cover, September 10, 1923

Dempsey's next defending fight was against French WWI hero Georges Carpentier, a fighter popular on both sides of the Atlantic. The bout was promoted by Tex Rickard and George Bernard Shaw, who claimed that Carpentier was "the greatest boxer in the world".

The Dempsey–Carpentier contest took place on July 2, 1921, at Boyle's Thirty Acres in Jersey City, New Jersey. It generated the first million-dollar gate in boxing history; a crowd of 91,000 watched the fight. Though it was deemed "the Fight of the Century", experts anticipated a one-sided win for Dempsey. Radio pioneer RCA arranged for live coverage of the match via KDKA, making the event the first national radio broadcast.

Carpentier wobbled Dempsey with a hard right in the second round. A reporter at ringside, however, counted 25 punches from Dempsey in a single 31-second exchange soon after he was supposedly injured by the right. Carpentier also broke his thumb in that round, which crippled his chances. Dempsey ended up winning the match in the fourth round.

Dempsey did not defend his title again until July 1923 against Tommy Gibbons in Shelby, Montana. Dempsey won the match as result of a 15-round decision.

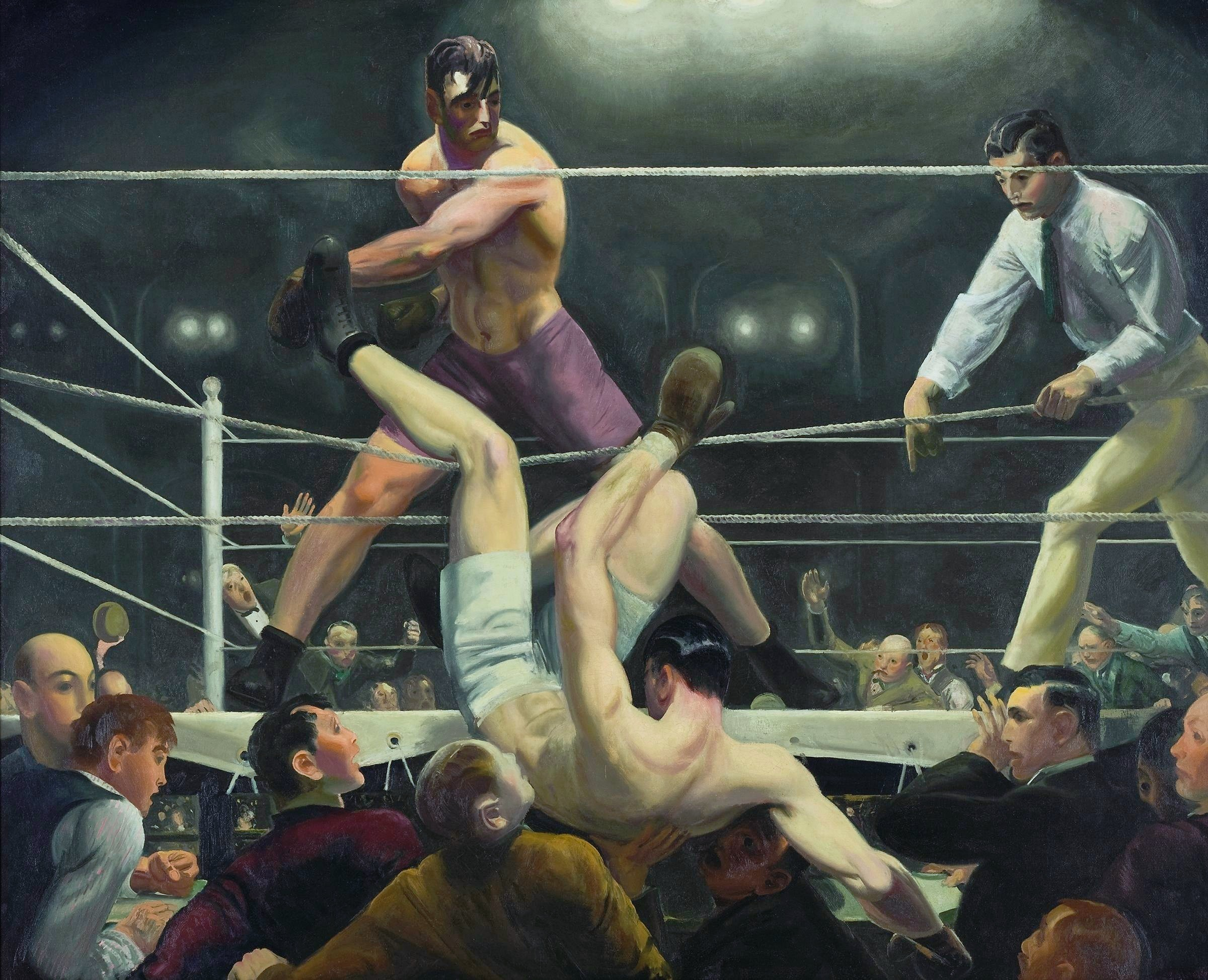
Dempsey and Firpo, 1924 painting by George Bellows

Jack Dempsey vs. Luis Ángel Firpo

The last successful title defense for Dempsey was in September 1923 at New York City's Polo Grounds in Dempsey vs. Firpo. Attendance was 85,000, with another 20,000 trying to get inside the arena. Firpo was knocked down repeatedly by Dempsey, yet continued to battle back, even knocking Dempsey down twice. On the second occasion he was floored, Dempsey flew head-first through the ring ropes, landing on a ringside reporter's typewriter. At this point he was out of the ring for approximately 14 seconds, less than the 20 second rule for out-of-ring knockouts. He was helped back into the ring by the writers at ringside. Ultimately, Dempsey beat Argentinian contender Luis Ángel Firpo with a second-round KO. The fight was transmitted live by radio to Buenos Aires.

Dempsey's heavyweight title-defending fights, exhibition fights, movies, and endorsements, made Dempsey one of the richest athletes in the world, putting him on the cover of Time.

=== Time off from boxing ===
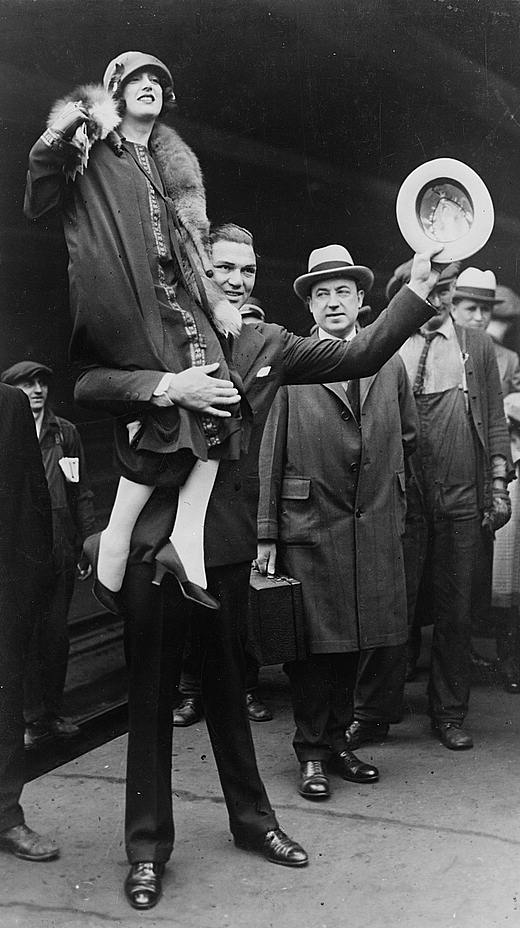
Jack Dempsey holding his wife, Estelle Taylor, on his shoulder

Dempsey did not defend his title for three years following the Firpo fight. There was pressure from the public and the media for Dempsey to defend his title against Black contender Harry Wills. Disagreement exists among boxing historians as to whether Dempsey avoided Wills, though Dempsey claimed he was willing to fight him. When he originally won the title, however, he had said he would no longer fight Black boxers.

Instead of continuing to defend his title, Dempsey earned money with boxing exhibitions, product endorsements, and by appearing in films, such as the adventure film serial Daredevil Jack. Dempsey also did a lot of traveling, spending, and partying. During this time away from competitive fighting, Dempsey married actress Estelle Taylor in 1925 and fired his long-time trainer/manager Jack "Doc" Kearns. Kearns repeatedly sued Dempsey for large sums of money following his firing.

In April 1924, Dempsey was appointed to an executive position in the Irish Worker League (IWL). The IWL was a Soviet-backed Communist group founded in Dublin by Irish labour leader Jim Larkin.

=== Loss of title ===
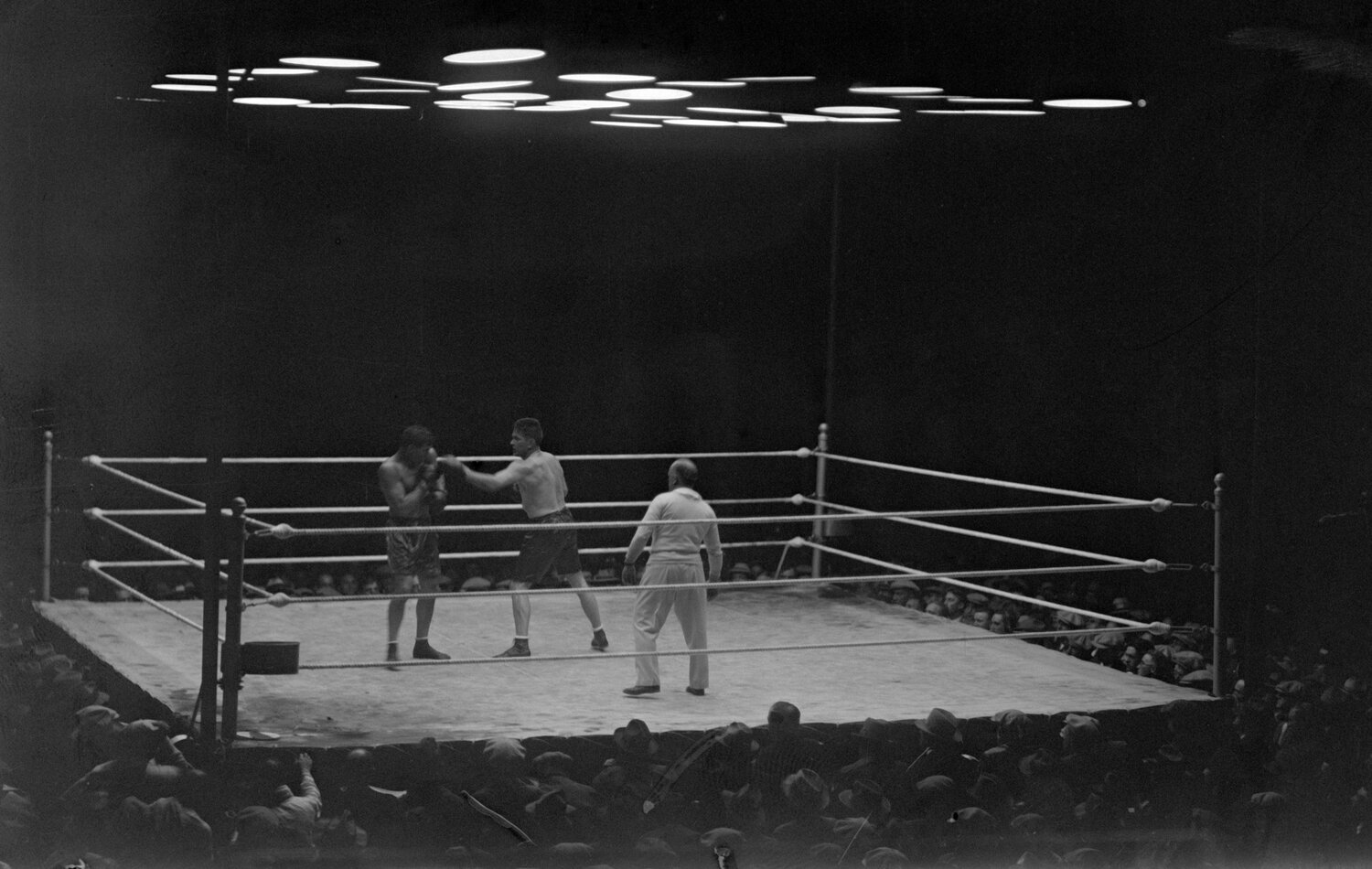
Tunney-Dempsey on September 23, 1926, at Sesquicentennial Stadium in Philadelphia

In September 1926, Dempsey fought the Irish American and former U.S. Marine Gene Tunney in Philadelphia, a fighter who had only lost once in his career. In spite of his record and Dempsey's inactivity, Tunney was considered the underdog against Dempsey.

The match ended in an upset, with Dempsey losing his title on points in 10 rounds. When the defeated Dempsey returned to his dressing room, he explained his loss to his wife by saying, "Honey, I forgot to duck." Fifty-five years later president Ronald Reagan borrowed this quote when his wife Nancy visited him in the emergency room after the attempt on his life.

=== Post-title loss ===
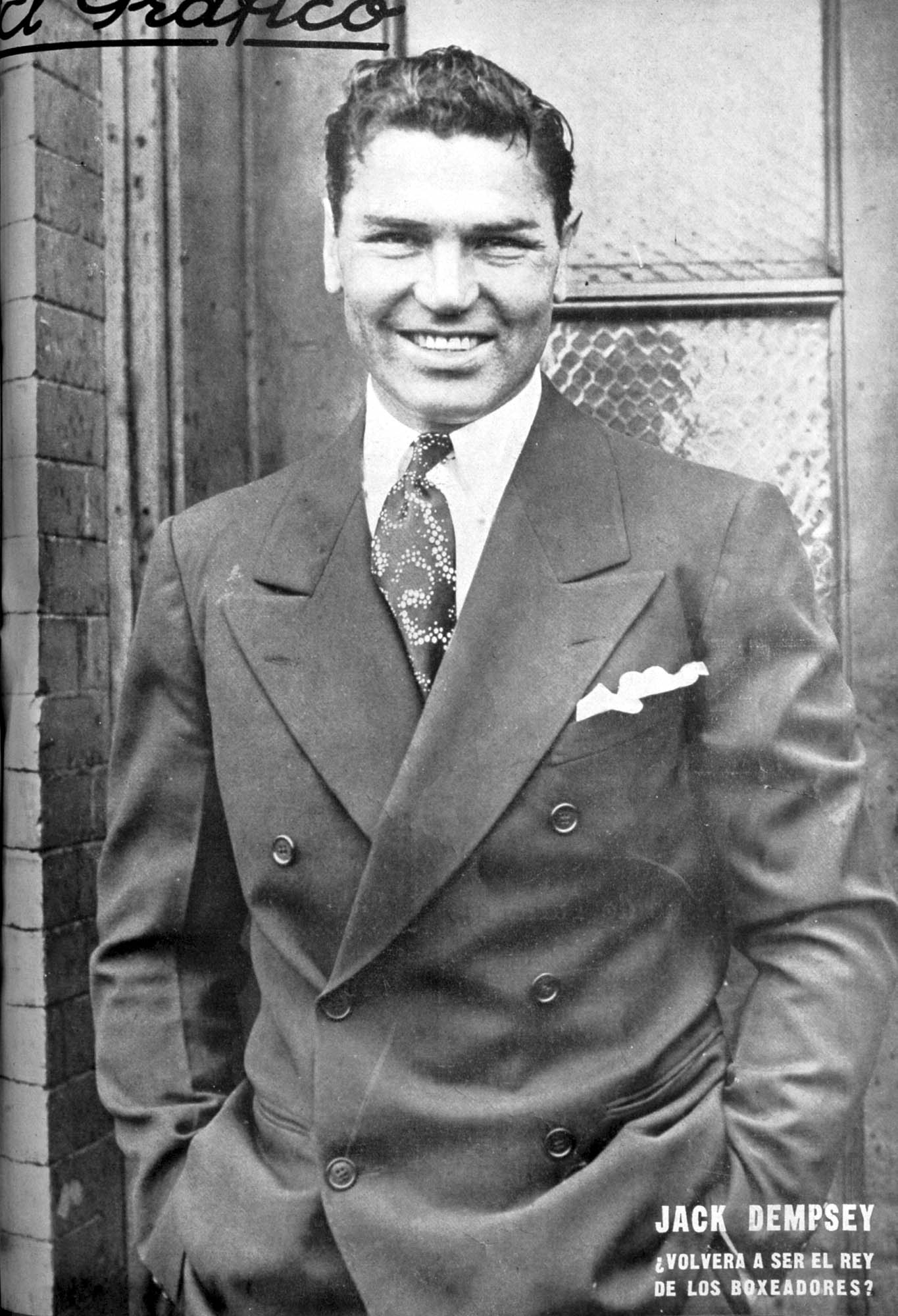
Dempsey in 1927, as he appeared on the cover of the Argentinian magazine El Gráfico

Following his loss of the heavyweight title, Dempsey contemplated retiring but decided to try a comeback. It was during this time period that tragedy struck his family when his brother, John Dempsey, shot his estranged wife Edna (aged 21) and then killed himself in a murder–suicide, leaving behind a two-year-old son, Bruce. Dempsey was called upon to identify the bodies and was emotionally affected by the incident.

During a July 21, 1927, fight at Yankee Stadium, Dempsey knocked out future heavyweight champion Jack Sharkey in the seventh round. The fight was an elimination bout for a title shot against Tunney. The fight was very competitive until the end. The fight ended controversially when Sharkey claimed Dempsey had been hitting him below the belt. When Sharkey turned to the referee to complain, he left himself unprotected and Dempsey crashed a left hook onto his foe's chin. Sharkey was unable to beat the ten-count. At the time of the knockout, Dempsey was leading on the scorecards.

=== Tunney rematch: "The Long Count" ===
The Dempsey–Tunney rematch took place in Chicago, on September 22, 1927 – one day less than a year after losing his title to Tunney. Generating more interest than the Carpentier and Firpo bouts, the fight brought in a record-setting $2 million gate. Reportedly, gangster Al Capone offered to fix the rematch in his favor, but the referee was changed to prevent that from happening. Millions around the country listened to the match by radio while hundreds of reporters covered the event. Tunney was paid a record one million dollars for the rematch. Today's equivalent in U.S. currency would be approximately $18,530,000.00.

Dempsey was losing the fight on points when in the seventh round he knocked Tunney down with a left hook to the chin then landed several more punches. A new rule instituted at the time of the fight mandated that when a fighter knocked down an opponent, he must immediately go to a neutral corner. Dempsey, however, refused to immediately move to the neutral corner when instructed by the referee. The referee had to escort Dempsey to the neutral corner, which bought Tunney at least an extra five seconds to recover. Even though the official timekeeper clocked 14 seconds Tunney was down, Tunney got up at the referee's count of 9. Dempsey then attempted to finish Tunney off before the end of the round, but failed to do so. Tunney dropped Dempsey for a count of one in round eight and won the final two rounds of the fight, retaining the title of world heavyweight champion on a unanimous decision. Ironically, the neutral corner rule was requested during negotiations by members of the Dempsey camp. Another discrepancy was, when Tunney knocked Dempsey down, the timekeeper started the count immediately, not waiting for Tunney to move to a neutral corner. Because of the controversial nature of the fight due to the neutral corner rule and conflicting counts, the Dempsey–Tunney rematch remains known as "The Long Count Fight".

== Personal life ==
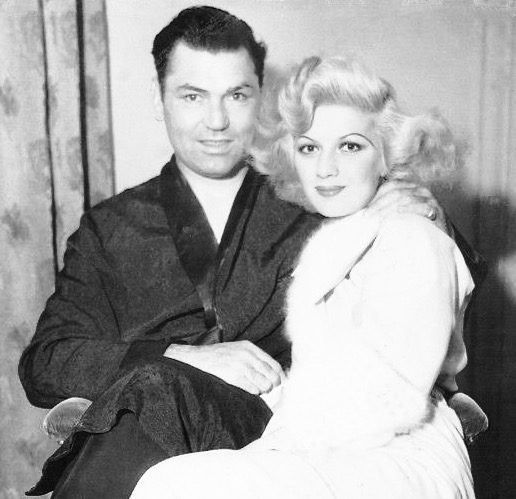
Jack Dempsey and Hannah Williams after their marriage in 1933

Dempsey married four times; his first two wives were Maxine Gates (married from 1916 to 1919) and Estelle Taylor (married in 1925). Dempsey divorced Taylor in 1931, and married Broadway singer and recent divorcee Hannah Williams in 1933. Williams was previously married to bandleader Roger Wolfe Kahn. Dempsey and Williams had two children together and divorced in 1943. Dempsey then married Deanna Piatelli, remaining married to her until his death in 1983. The couple had one child, a daughter, whom they adopted together, and who would later write a book on Dempsey's life with Piatelli.

Dempsey was also engaged to Mamie Van Doren, when she was Joan Olander, in 1951. Van Doren details the relationship in her autobiography.

One of Dempsey's best friends was Judge John Sirica, who presided over the Watergate trials.

== Later life and death ==
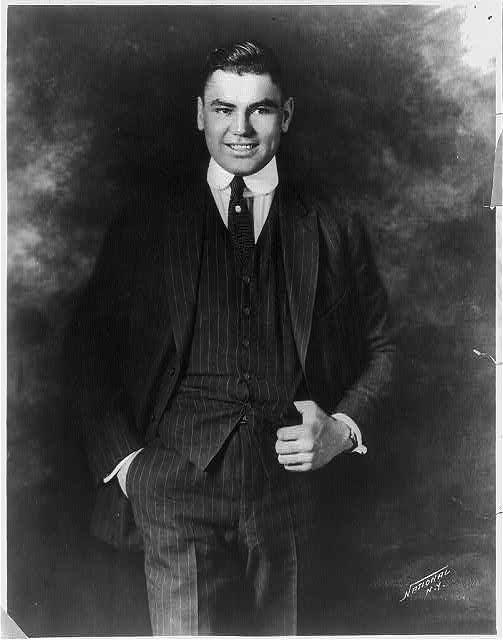
Portrait of Dempsey (date unknown)

Dempsey retired from boxing following the Tunney rematch, but continued participating in exhibition bouts, taking part in more than 100 between 1930 and 1931 alone. He also considered a professional comeback in the summer of 1932, hoping to face Tunney in a third bout, but Tunney showed no interest in coming out of retirement. Following retirement, Dempsey became known as a philanthropist. In June 1932, he sponsored the "Ride of Champions" bucking horse event at Reno, Nevada, with the "Dempsey Trophy" going to legendary bronc rider Pete Knight. In 1933, Dempsey was approached by Metro-Goldwyn-Mayer to portray a boxer in the film, The Prizefighter and the Lady, directed by W. S. Van Dyke and co-starring Myrna Loy. Dempsey portrayed himself in the role of referee of the climactic fight between Max Baer (playing the role of Steve Morgan) and Primo Carnera (playing himself), a fictional battle that foreshadowed their actual championship bout only a year later. Dempsey attempted a boxing comeback in 1940 at the age of 45, setting a match against Cowboy Luttrell on July 1. The fight resulted in Dempsey knocking Luttrell out in the second round. Dempsey won two more exhibitions with early knockouts before deciding to call off the comeback and retire for good.

The Riviera del Pacifico Cultural and Convention Center in Ensenada, Baja California, Mexico, built in 1930, was a gambling casino supposedly financed by Al Capone and managed by Dempsey. Its clientele included George Raft, Errol Flynn, Myrna Loy, Lana Turner, Rita Hayworth, and Dolores del Río.

In 1935, Dempsey opened Jack Dempsey's Restaurant in New York City on Eighth Avenue and 50th Street, across from the third Madison Square Garden. The restaurant's name was later changed to Jack Dempsey's Broadway Restaurant when it relocated to Times Square on Broadway between 49th and 50th Streets. It remained open until 1974. Dempsey was also a co-owner of the Howard Manor in Palm Springs, California.

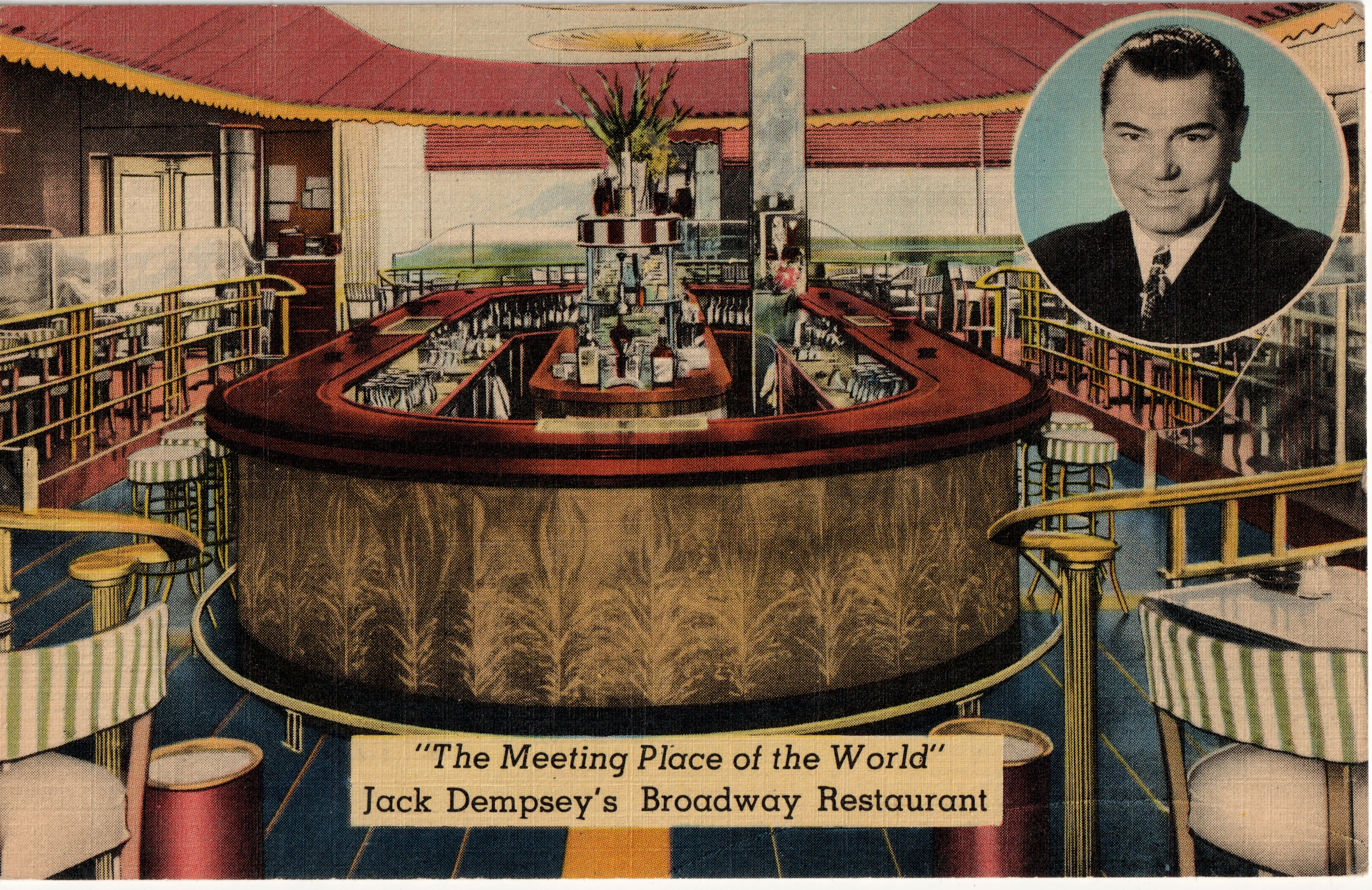
Jack Dempsey's Broadway Restaurant promotional postcard

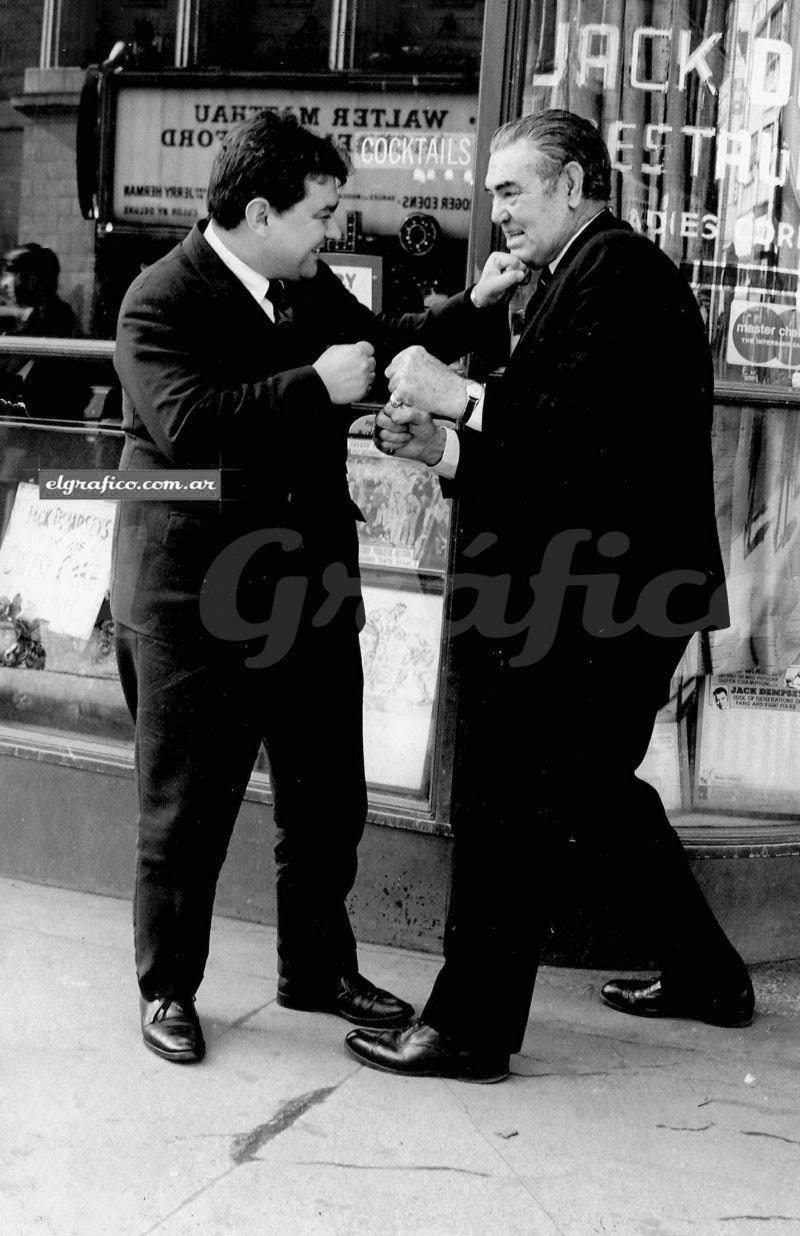
Dempsey (right) playing to box with El Gráfico journalist who interviewed him in Broadway, 1970

Dempsey wrote a book on boxing titled Championship Fighting: Explosive Punching and Aggressive Defense and published in 1950. The book emphasizes knockout power derived from enabling fast motion from one's heavy bodyweight.

After the world-famous Louis–Schmeling fight, Dempsey stated he was glad he never had to face Joe Louis in the ring; when Louis eventually fell on hard times financially, Dempsey served as honorary chairman of a relief fund to assist him.

Dempsey made friends with former opponents Wills and Tunney after retirement, with Dempsey campaigning for Tunney's son, Democrat John V. Tunney, when he successfully ran for the U.S. Senate, from California. He was also one of many boxers to attend the funeral of Feab S. Williams, who boxed under the name of George Godfrey.

=== Service during World War II ===
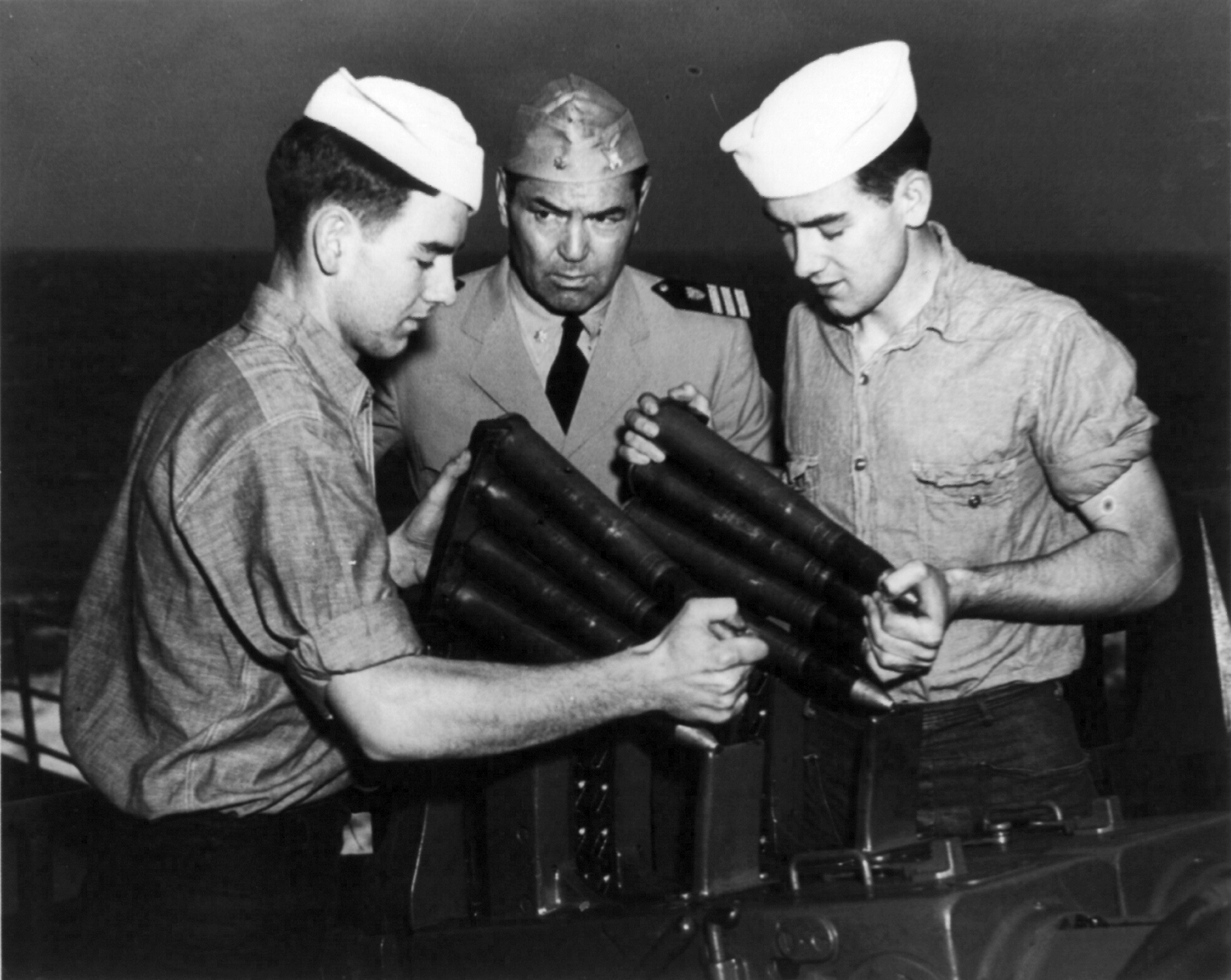
Commander Dempsey (center) looking on as two seamen load an antiaircraft gun, c. 1942–44

When the United States entered World War II, Dempsey had an opportunity to refute any remaining criticism of his war record of two decades earlier. He joined the New York State Guard and was given a commission as a first lieutenant, later resigning that commission to accept a commission as a lieutenant in the Coast Guard Reserve. He reported for duty in June 1942 at Coast Guard Training Station, Manhattan Beach, Brooklyn, New York, where he was assigned as "Director of Physical Education". As part of the ongoing war effort, he made personal appearances at fights, camps, hospitals, and war bond drives. He was promoted to lieutenant commander in December 1942 and commander in March 1944. In 1944, he was assigned to the transport USS Wakefield (AP-21). In 1945, he was on board the attack transport USS Arthur Middleton (APA-25) for the invasion of Okinawa. He also spent time aboard the USS General William Mitchell (AP-114), where he spent time showing the crew sparring techniques. He was released from active duty in September 1945 and received an honorable discharge from the Coast Guard Reserve in 1952.

=== Professional wrestling ===
After retiring from boxing, Dempsey became involved in professional wrestling as a featured attraction and a frequent referee in those said featured attractions. The first match that Dempsey refereed was at a show in Dallas on January 9, 1931, between Jim O'Dowd and Billy Edwards. In the match, Dempsey retaliated against an attack from Edwards with a straight punch, which caused O'Dowd to win the match. Six years later, on October 18, 1937, he refereed an entire show at the Jaffa Mosque in Altoona, Pennsylvania, where the main event was between Wally Dusek and Ray Steele. In April 1947, he and Jack Sharkey co-refereed a two-out-of-three falls tag team match between Emil Dusek and Ernie Dusek of the Dusek Family against Yvon Robert and Larry Moquin in Montreal. Robert and Moquin, who were the faces, defeated the brothers.

He famously refereed a match on June 21, 1950, between "Nature Boy" Buddy Rogers and the NWA World's Heavyweight Champion Lou Thesz. Thesz won the bout after getting Rogers stuck between the top and middle ropes in a choke hold, which prompted Dempsey to do a 10 count to signal a stoppage. Later that year, in December, he refereed a bout between Primo Carnera and Chief Don Eagle. The match was noted for being the first time since 1937 that Dempsey had been physically involved against a wrestler when, after Carnera, who was playing the heel in the match, drew the ire of Dempsey by way of illegal tactics during the match, Dempsey hit Carnera with two punches before Eagle pinned him.

The last match he guest refereed was a June 28, 1958 match between Pat O'Connor and Killer Kowalski. The 63 year old Dempsey took a shot to the back of the head, which prompted a scare for the promoter and ring-side crew, but did not have any major or life-threatening injuries as a result.

=== Death ===
On May 31, 1983, Dempsey died of heart failure at the age of 87 in New York City. His body was buried at Southampton Cemetery in Southampton, New York.

== Legacy ==
In 1957, Dempsey was honored with the James J. Walker Memorial Award by the Boxing Writers Association of America in recognition of his long and meritorious service to boxing. He was an inaugural 1954 inductee to The Ring magazine's Boxing Hall of Fame (disbanded in 1987), and was an inaugural 1990 inductee to the International Boxing Hall of Fame. In 1970, Dempsey became part of the "charter class" in the Utah Sports Hall of Fame. In 2025, he was inducted into the United States Athletics Hall of Fame.

He recounted an incident where he was assaulted while walking home at night, telling the press in 1971 that the two young muggers attempted to grab his arms, but he broke free and laid them both out cold on the sidewalk. The story of the encounter appeared in the Hendersonville Times-News, and reported the incident had taken place "a few years [earlier]". In 1977, in collaboration with his daughter Barbara Lynn, Dempsey published his autobiography, titled Dempsey. In tribute to his legacy and boxing career, a 2004 PBS documentary summarized "Dempsey's boxing style consisted of constantly bobbing and weaving. His attacks were furious and sustained. Behind it all was rage. His aggressive behavior prompted a rule that boxers had to retreat to a neutral corner and give opponents who had been knocked down a chance to get up." According to the Encyclopædia Britannica, constant attack was his strategic defense. In 2011, Dempsey was posthumously inducted into the Irish American Hall of Fame.

Dempsey was a Freemason and member of Kenwood Lodge #800 in Chicago.

== Professional boxing record ==
=== Official record ===
84 fights	63 wins	6 losses
By knockout	53	1
By decision	9	5
By disqualification	1	0
Draws	9	
Newspaper decisions/draws	6	

All newspaper decisions are officially regarded as "no decision" bouts and are not counted in the win/loss/draw column.

No.	Result	Record	Opponent	Type	Round, time	Date	Location	Notes
84	Loss	63–6–9 (6)	Gene Tunney	UD	10	22 Sep 1927	Soldier Field, Chicago, Chicago, Illinois, U.S.	For NYSAC, NBA, and The Ring heavyweight titles
83	Win	63–5–9 (6)	Jack Sharkey	KO	7 (15), 0:45	21 Jul 1927	Yankee Stadium, New York City, New York, U.S.	
82	Loss	62–5–9 (6)	Gene Tunney	UD	10	23 Sep 1926	Sesquicentennial Stadium, Philadelphia, Pennsylvania, U.S.	Lost NYSAC, NBA, and The Ring heavyweight titles
81	Win	62–4–9 (6)	Luis Ángel Firpo	TKO	2 (15), 0:57	14 Sep 1923	Polo Grounds, New York City, New York, U.S.	Retained NYSAC, NBA, and The Ring heavyweight titles
80	Win	61–4–9 (6)	Tommy Gibbons	PTS	15	4 Jul 1923	Arena, Shelby, Montana, U.S.	Retained NYSAC, NBA, and The Ring heavyweight titles
79	Win	60–4–9 (6)	Georges Carpentier	KO	4 (12)	2 Jul 1921	Boyle's Thirty Acres, Jersey City, New Jersey U.S.	Retained NYSAC and NBA heavyweight titles
78	Win	59–4–9 (6)	Bill Brennan	KO	12 (15), 1:57	14 Dec 1920	Madison Square Garden, New York City, New York, U.S.	Retained NYSAC heavyweight title
77	Win	58–4–9 (6)	Billy Miske	KO	3 (10), 1:13	6 Sep 1920	Floyd Fitzsimmons Arena, Benton Harbor, Michigan, U.S.	Retained NYSAC heavyweight title
76	Win	57–4–9 (6)	Jess Willard	RTD	3 (12)	4 Jul 1919	Bay View Park Arena, Toledo, Ohio, U.S.	Won world heavyweight title
75	Win	56–4–9 (6)	Tony Drake	KO	1	2 Apr 1919	New Haven, Connecticut, U.S.	
74	Win	55–4–9 (6)	Eddie Smith	KO	1	13 Feb 1919	Altoona, Pennsylvania, U.S.	
73	Win	54–4–9 (6)	Kid Harris	KO	1	29 Jan 1919	Easton, Pennsylvania, U.S.	
72	Win	53–4–9 (6)	Kid Harris	KO	1	23 Jan 1919	Reading, Pennsylvania, U.S.	
71	Win	52–4–9 (6)	Big Jack Hickey	KO	1	20 Jan 1919	Harrisburg, Pennsylvania, U.S.	
70	Win	51–4–9 (6)	Jack Maguire	KO	1	16 Jan 1919	Trenton, New Jersey, U.S.	
69	Win	50–4–9 (6)	Gunboat Smith	KO	2 (8)	16 Dec 1918	Broadway Auditorium, Buffalo, New York, U.S.	
68	Win	49–4–9 (6)	Carl Morris	KO	1 (20), 1:00	16 Dec 1918	Louisiana Auditorium, New Orleans, Louisiana, U.S.	
67	Win	48–4–9 (6)	Billy Miske	NWS	6	28 Nov 1918	Olympia Athletic Club, Philadelphia, Pennsylvania, U.S.	
66	Win	48–4–9 (5)	Dan Flynn	KO	1 (6), 2:16	18 Nov 1918	Olympia Athletic Club, Philadelphia, Pennsylvania, U.S.	
65	Win	47–4–9 (5)	Battling Levinsky	KO	3 (6)	6 Nov 1918	Olympia Athletic Club, Philadelphia, U.S.	
64	Win	46–4–9 (5)	Jack Moran	KO	1 (10), 1:10	14 Sep 1918	Moana Springs Arena, Reno, Nevada, U.S.	
63	Loss	45–4–9 (5)	Willie Meehan	PTS	4	13 Sep 1918	San Francisco Civic Auditorium, San Francisco, U.S.	
62	Win	45–3–9 (5)	Terry Kellar	TKO	5 (15)	24 Aug 1918	Westwood Field Gym, Dayton, Ohio, U.S.	
61	Win	44–3–9 (5)	Fred Fulton	KO	1 (8), 0:23	27 Jul 1918	Harrison Park, Harrison, New Jersey, U.S.	
60	Win	43–3–9 (5)	Dan Flynn	KO	1 (10)	6 Jul 1918	Municipal Auditorium, Atlanta, U.S.	
59	Win	42–3–9 (5)	Bob Devere	KO	1 (12)	4 Jul 1918	Joe Becker Stadium, Joplin, Missouri, U.S.	
58	Win	41–3–9 (5)	Tom McCarty	KO	1 (12), 0:30	1 Jul 1918	Tulsa Convention Hall, Tulsa, Oklahoma, U.S.	
57	Win	40–3–9 (5)	Arthur Pelkey	KO	1 (15), 1:00	29 May 1918	Stockyards Stadium, Denver, U.S.	
56	Win	39–3–9 (5)	Dan Ketchell	KO	2 (10)	22 May 1918	Excelsior Springs, Missouri, U.S.	
55	Win	38–3–9 (5)	Billy Miske	NWS	10	3 May 1918	Auditorium, Saint Paul, Minnesota, U.S.	
54	Win	38–3–9 (4)	Tom Riley	KO	1 (15)	25 Mar 1918	Southwest Athletic Club, Joplin, Missouri, U.S.	
53	Win	37–3–9 (4)	Fred Saddy	KO	1 (8)	16 Mar 1918	Phoenix Athletic Club, Memphis, Tennessee, U.S.	
52	Win	36–3–9 (4)	Bill Brennan	TKO	6 (10)	25 Feb 1918	Milwaukee Auditorium, Milwaukee, Wisconsin, U.S.	
51	Win	35–3–9 (4)	Fireman Jim Flynn	KO	1 (10), 1:10	14 Feb 1918	Fort Sheridan, Illinois, U.S.	
50	Win	34–3–9 (4)	Carl Morris	DQ	6 (10)	2 Feb 1918	Broadway Auditorium, Buffalo, New York, U.S.	
49	Win	33–3–9 (4)	Homer Smith	KO	1 (10), 1:15	24 Jan 1918	Racine, Wisconsin, U.S.	
48	Win	32–3–9 (4)	Carl Morris	PTS	4	2 Nov 1917	Dreamland Rink, San Francisco, U.S.	
47	Win	31–3–9 (4)	Gunboat Smith	PTS	4	2 Oct 1917	Recreation Park, San Francisco, U.S.	
46	Win	30–3–9 (4)	Bob McAllister	PTS	4	26 Sep 1917	Arena, Emeryville, California, U.S.	
45	Win	29–3–9 (4)	Charley Miller	TKO	1 (4)	19 Sep 1917	Arena, Emeryville, California, U.S.	
44	Win	28–3–9 (4)	Willie Meehan	TKO	1 (4)	19 Sep 1917	Arena, Emeryville, California, U.S.	
43	Draw	27–3–9 (4)	Willie Meehan	PTS	4	7 Sep 1917	Dreamland Rink, San Francisco, U.S.	
42	Draw	27–3–8 (4)	Willie Meehan	PTS	4	10 Aug 1917	Dreamland Rink, San Francisco, U.S.	
41	Win	27–3–7 (4)	Al Norton	KO	1 (4)	1 Aug 1917	Arena, Emeryville, California, U.S.	
40	Win	26–3–7 (4)	Willie Meehan	PTS	4	25 Jul 1917	Arena, Emeryville, California, U.S.	
39	Draw	25–3–7 (4)	Al Norton	PTS	4	11 Apr 1917	West Oakland Club, Oakland, California, U.S.	
38	Loss	25–3–6 (4)	Willie Meehan	PTS	4	28 Mar 1917	Arena, Emeryville, California, U.S.	
37	Draw	25–2–6 (4)	Al Norton	PTS	4	21 Mar 1917	West Oakland Club, Oakland, California, U.S.	
36	Loss	25–2–5 (4)	Fireman Jim Flynn	KO	1 (15), 0:25	13 Feb 1917	Trocadero Hall, Murray, Utah, U.S.	
35	Win	25–1–5 (4)	Young Hector	KO	2	29 Nov 1916	The Rink, Salida, Colorado, U.S.	
34	Win	24–1–5 (4)	Dick Gilbert	PTS	10	16 Oct 1916	Salt Lake Theater, Salt Lake City, U.S.	
33	Win	23–1–5 (4)	Terry Kellar	PTS	10	7 Oct 1916	Bijo Hall, Ely, Nevada, U.S.	
32	Win	22–1–5 (4)	Young Hector	RTD	3 (15)	28 Sep 1916	Fire Hall, Murray, Utah, U.S.	
31	Draw	21–1–5 (4)	John Lester Johnson	NWS	10	14 Jul 1916	Harlem Sporting Club, Harlem, New York, U.S.	
30	Win	21–1–5 (3)	Bert Kenny	NWS	10	8 Jul 1916	Fairmont Athletic Club, Bronx, New York, U.S.	
29	Win	21–1–5 (2)	Andre Anderson	NWS	10	24 Jun 1916	Fairmont Athletic Club, Bronx, New York, U.S.	
28	Win	21–1–5 (1)	Bob York	KO	4 (6)	30 May 1916	Eko Theatre, Price, Utah, U.S.	For Pacific Coast light-heavyweight title
27	Win	20–1–5 (1)	Dan Ketchell	TKO	3 (10)	17 May 1916	Mozart Theatre, Provo, Utah, U.S.	
26	Win	19–1–5 (1)	Terry Kellar	PTS	10	3 May 1916	Alhambra Theatre, Ogden, Utah, U.S.	
25	Win	18–1–5 (1)	Joe Bonds	PTS	10	8 Apr 1916	Bijo Hall, Ely, Nevada, U.S.	
24	Win	17–1–5 (1)	George Christian	KO	1 (15)	17 Mar 1916	Eko Theatre, Price, Utah, U.S.	
23	Win	16–1–5 (1)	Cyril Kohen	KO	4 (6)	9 Mar 1916	Mozart Theatre, Provo, Utah, U.S.	
22	Win	15–1–5 (1)	Boston Bearcat	KO	1	23 Feb 1916	Armory, Ogden, Utah, U.S.	
21	Win	14–1–5 (1)	Jack Downey	KO	2	21 Feb 1916	Grand Theater, Salt Lake City, U.S.	
20	Win	13–1–5 (1)	Swede Johnson	KO	2	5 Feb 1916	Bijo Hall, Ely, Nevada, U.S.	
19	Win	12–1–5 (1)	Johnny Sudenberg	KO	2	1 Feb 1916	Bijo Hall, Ely, Nevada, U.S.	
18	Win	11–1–5 (1)	Jack Gillian	TKO	1 (4)	20 Dec 1915	Grand Theater, Salt Lake City, U.S.	
17	Draw	10–1–5 (1)	Jack Downey	PTS	4	13 Dec 1915	Grand Theater, Salt Lake City, U.S.	
16	Win	10–1–4 (1)	George Coplen	KO	6 (10)	19 Nov 1915	Lyric Opera House, Cripple Creek, Colorado, U.S.	
15	Win	9–1–4 (1)	Andy Malloy	KO	3 (10)	23 Oct 1915	Moose Hall, Montrose, Colorado, U.S.	
14	Win	8–1–4 (1)	Andy Malloy	NWS	10	7 Oct 1915	Gem Theatre, Durango, Colorado, U.S.	
13	Win	8–1–4	Fred Woods	KO	4	23 Sep 1915	Moose Hall, Montrose, Colorado, U.S.	
12	Draw	7–1–4	Johnny Sudenberg	PTS	10	11 Jun 1915	Airdome, Tonopah, Nevada, U.S.	
11	Draw	7–1–3	Johnny Sudenberg	PTS	10	31 May 1915	Hippodrome, Goldfield, Nevada, U.S.	
10	Win	7–1–2	Emmanuel Campbell	TKO	4 (4)	26 Apr 1915	Airdrome Arena, Reno, Arizona, U.S.	
9	Loss	6–1–2	Jack Downey	PTS	10	5 Apr 1915	Garrick Theater, Salt Lake City, U.S.	
8	Win	6–0–2	Chief Gordon	KO	6	1 Apr 1915	Utah, U.S.	
7	Win	5–0–2	John Pierson	KO	7	3 Mar 1915	Utah, U.S.	
6	Draw	4–0–2	Chief Geronimo	PTS	4	26 Feb 1915	Pocatello, Idaho, U.S.	
5	Win	4–0–1	Joe Lyons	KO	9	2 Feb 1915	Utah, U.S.	
4	Win	3–0–1	Battling Johnson	KO	1	Jan 1915	Utah, U.S.	
3	Win	2–0–1	Billy Murphy	KO	1 (4)	30 Nov 1914	Garrick Theater, Salt Lake City, U.S.	
2	Win	1–0–1	Young Hancock	KO	1 (4)	2 Nov 1914	Garrick Theater, Salt Lake City, U.S.	
1	Draw	0–0–1	Young Herman	PTS	6	18 Aug 1914	Ramona Athletic Club Arena, Colorado Springs, Colorado, U.S.	

=== Unofficial record ===
84 fights	68 wins	6 losses
By knockout	53	1
By decision	14	5
By disqualification	1	0
Draws	10	

Record with the inclusion of newspaper decisions to the win/loss/draw column.

No.	Result	Record	Opponent	Type	Round, time	Date	Location	Notes
84	Loss	68–6–10	Gene Tunney	UD	10	22 Sep 1927	Soldier Field, Chicago, U.S.	For NYSAC, NBA, and The Ring heavyweight titles
83	Win	68–5–10	Jack Sharkey	KO	7 (15), 0:45	21 Jul 1927	Yankee Stadium, New York City, U.S.	
82	Loss	67–5–10	Gene Tunney	UD	10	23 Sep 1926	Sesquicentennial Stadium, Philadelphia,, U.S.	Lost NYSAC, NBA, and The Ring heavyweight titles
81	Win	67–4–10	Luis Ángel Firpo	TKO	2 (15), 0:57	14 Sep 1923	Polo Grounds, New York City, U.S.	Retained NYSAC, NBA, and The Ring heavyweight titles
80	Win	66–4–10	Tommy Gibbons	PTS	15	4 Jul 1923	Arena, Shelby, Montana, U.S.	Retained NYSAC, NBA, and The Ring heavyweight titles
79	Win	65–4–10	Georges Carpentier	KO	4 (12)	2 Jul 1921	Boyle's Thirty Acres, Jersey City, New Jersey, U.S.	Retained NYSAC and NBA heavyweight titles
78	Win	64–4–10	Bill Brennan	KO	12 (15), 1:57	14 Dec 1920	Madison Square Garden, New York City, U.S.	Retained NYSAC heavyweight title
77	Win	63–4–10	Billy Miske	KO	3 (10), 1:13	6 Sep 1920	Floyd Fitzsimmons Arena, Benton Harbor, Michigan, U.S.	Retained NYSAC heavyweight title
76	Win	62–4–10	Jess Willard	RTD	3 (12)	4 Jul 1919	Bay View Park Arena, Toledo, Ohio, U.S.	Won world heavyweight title
75	Win	61–4–10	Tony Drake	KO	1	2 Apr 1919	New Haven, Connecticut, U.S.	
74	Win	60–4–10	Eddie Smith	KO	1	13 Feb 1919	Altoona, Pennsylvania, U.S.	
73	Win	59–4–10	Kid Harris	KO	1	29 Jan 1919	Easton, Pennsylvania, U.S.	
72	Win	58–4–10	Kid Harris	KO	1	23 Jan 1919	Reading, Pennsylvania, U.S.	
71	Win	57–4–10	Big Jack Hickey	KO	1	20 Jan 1919	Harrisburg, Pennsylvania, U.S.	
70	Win	56–4–10	Jack Maguire	KO	1	16 Jan 1919	Trenton, New Jersey, U.S.	
69	Win	55–4–10	Gunboat Smith	KO	2 (8)	16 Dec 1918	Broadway Auditorium, Buffalo, New York, U.S.	
68	Win	54–4–10	Carl Morris	KO	1 (20), 1:00	16 Dec 1918	Louisiana Auditorium, New Orleans, U.S.	
67	Win	53–4–10	Billy Miske	NWS	6	28 Nov 1918	Olympia Athletic Club, Philadelphia, U.S.	
66	Win	52–4–10	Dan Flynn	KO	1 (6), 2:16	18 Nov 1918	Olympia Athletic Club, Philadelphia, U.S.	
65	Win	51–4–10	Battling Levinsky	KO	3 (6)	6 Nov 1918	Olympia Athletic Club, Philadelphia, U.S.	
64	Win	50–4–10	Jack Moran	KO	1 (10), 1:10	14 Sep 1918	Moana Springs Arena, Reno, Nevada, U.S.	
63	Loss	49–4–10	Willie Meehan	PTS	4	13 Sep 1918	San Francisco Civic Auditorium, San Francisco, California, U.S.	
62	Win	49–3–10	Terry Kellar	TKO	5 (15)	24 Aug 1918	Westwood Field Gym, Dayton, Ohio, U.S.	
61	Win	48–3–10	Fred Fulton	KO	1 (8), 0:23	27 Jul 1918	Harrison Park, Harrison, New Jersey, U.S.	
60	Win	47–3–10	Dan Flynn	KO	1 (10)	6 Jul 1918	Municipal Auditorium, Atlanta, U.S.	
59	Win	46–3–10	Bob Devere	KO	1 (12)	4 Jul 1918	Joe Becker Stadium, Joplin, Missouri, U.S.	
58	Win	45–3–10	Tom McCarty	KO	1 (12), 0:30	1 Jul 1918	Tulsa Convention Hall, Tulsa, Oklahoma, U.S.	
57	Win	44–3–10	Arthur Pelkey	KO	1 (15), 1:00	29 May 1918	Stockyards Stadium, Denver, U.S.	
56	Win	43–3–10	Dan Ketchell	KO	2 (10)	22 May 1918	Excelsior Springs, Missouri, U.S.	
55	Win	42–3–10	Billy Miske	NWS	10	3 May 1918	Auditorium, Saint Paul, Minnesota, U.S.	
54	Win	41–3–10	Tom Riley	KO	1 (15)	25 Mar 1918	Southwest Athletic Club, Joplin, Missouri, U.S.	
53	Win	40–3–10	Fred Saddy	KO	1 (8)	16 Mar 1918	Phoenix Athletic Club, Memphis, Tennessee, U.S.	
52	Win	39–3–10	Bill Brennan	TKO	6 (10)	25 Feb 1918	Milwaukee Auditorium, Milwaukee, Wisconsin, U.S.	
51	Win	38–3–10	Fireman Jim Flynn	KO	1 (10), 1:10	14 Feb 1918	Fort Sheridan, Illinois, U.S.	
50	Win	37–3–10	Carl Morris	DQ	6 (10)	2 Feb 1918	Broadway Auditorium, Buffalo, New York, U.S.	
49	Win	36–3–10	Homer Smith	KO	1 (10), 1:15	24 Jan 1918	Racine, Wisconsin, U.S.	
48	Win	35–3–10	Carl Morris	PTS	4	2 Nov 1917	Dreamland Rink, San Francisco, U.S.	
47	Win	34–3–10	Gunboat Smith	PTS	4	2 Oct 1917	Recreation Park, San Francisco, U.S.	
46	Win	33–3–10	Bob McAllister	PTS	4	26 Sep 1917	Arena, Emeryville, California, U.S.	
45	Win	32–3–10	Charley Miller	TKO	1 (4)	19 Sep 1917	Arena, Emeryville, California, U.S.	
44	Win	31–3–10	Willie Meehan	TKO	1 (4)	19 Sep 1917	Arena, Emeryville, California, U.S.	
43	Draw	30–3–10	Willie Meehan	PTS	4	7 Sep 1917	Dreamland Rink, San Francisco, U.S.	
42	Draw	30–3–9	Willie Meehan	PTS	4	10 Aug 1917	Dreamland Rink, San Francisco, U.S.	
41	Win	30–3–8	Al Norton	KO	1 (4)	1 Aug 1917	Arena, Emeryville, California, U.S.	
40	Win	29–3–8	Willie Meehan	PTS	4	25 Jul 1917	Arena, Emeryville, California, U.S.	
39	Draw	28–3–8	Al Norton	PTS	4	11 Apr 1917	West Oakland Club, Oakland, California, U.S.	
38	Loss	28–3–7	Willie Meehan	PTS	4	28 Mar 1917	Arena, Emeryville, California, U.S.	
37	Draw	28–2–7	Al Norton	PTS	4	21 Mar 1917	West Oakland Club, Oakland, California, U.S.	
36	Loss	28–2–6	Fireman Jim Flynn	KO	1 (15), 0:25	13 Feb 1917	Trocadero Hall, Murray, Utah, U.S.	
35	Win	28–1–6	Young Hector	KO	2	29 Nov 1916	The Rink, Salida, Colorado, U.S.	
34	Win	27–1–6	Dick Gilbert	PTS	10	16 Oct 1916	Salt Lake Theater, Salt Lake City, U.S.	
33	Win	26–1–6	Terry Kellar	PTS	10	7 Oct 1916	Bijo Hall, Ely, Nevada, U.S.	
32	Win	25–1–6	Young Hector	RTD	3 (15)	28 Sep 1916	Fire Hall, Murray, Utah, U.S.	
31	Draw	24–1–6	John Lester Johnson	NWS	10	14 Jul 1916	Harlem Sporting Club, Harlem, New York, U.S.	
30	Win	24–1–5	Bert Kenny	NWS	10	8 Jul 1916	Fairmont Athletic Club, Bronx, New York, U.S.	
29	Win	23–1–5	Andre Anderson	NWS	10	24 Jun 1916	Fairmont Athletic Club, Bronx, New York, U.S.	
28	Win	22–1–5	Bob York	KO	4 (6)	30 May 1916	Eko Theatre, Price, Utah, U.S.	For Pacific Coast light-heavyweight title
27	Win	21–1–5	Dan Ketchell	TKO	3 (10)	17 May 1916	Mozart Theatre, Provo, Utah, U.S.	
26	Win	20–1–5	Terry Kellar	PTS	10	3 May 1916	Alhambra Theatre, Ogden, Utah, U.S.	
25	Win	19–1–5	Joe Bonds	PTS	10	8 Apr 1916	Bijo Hall, Ely, Nevada, U.S.	
24	Win	18–1–5	George Christian	KO	1 (15)	17 Mar 1916	Eko Theatre, Price, Utah, U.S.	
23	Win	17–1–5	Cyril Kohen	KO	4 (6)	9 Mar 1916	Mozart Theatre, Provo, Utah, U.S.	
22	Win	16–1–5	Boston Bearcat	KO	1	23 Feb 1916	Armory, Ogden, Utah, U.S.	
21	Win	15–1–5	Jack Downey	KO	2	21 Feb 1916	Grand Theater, Salt Lake City, U.S.	
20	Win	14–1–5	Swede Johnson	KO	2	5 Feb 1916	Bijo Hall, Ely, Nevada, U.S.	
19	Win	13–1–5	Johnny Sudenberg	KO	2	1 Feb 1916	Bijo Hall, Ely, Nevada, U.S.	
18	Win	12–1–5	Jack Gillian	TKO	1 (4)	20 Dec 1915	Grand Theater, Salt Lake City, U.S.	
17	Draw	11–1–5	Jack Downey	PTS	4	13 Dec 1915	Grand Theater, Salt Lake City, U.S.	
16	Win	11–1–4	George Coplen	KO	6 (10)	19 Nov 1915	Lyric Opera House, Cripple Creek, Colorado, U.S.	
15	Win	10–1–4	Andy Malloy	KO	3 (10)	23 Oct 1915	Moose Hall, Montrose, Colorado, U.S.	
14	Win	9–1–4	Andy Malloy	NWS	10	7 Oct 1915	Gem Theatre, Durango, Colorado, U.S.	
13	Win	8–1–4	Fred Woods	KO	4	23 Sep 1915	Moose Hall, Montrose, Colorado, U.S.	
12	Draw	7–1–4	Johnny Sudenberg	PTS	10	11 Jun 1915	Airdome, Tonopah, Nevada, U.S.	
11	Draw	7–1–3	Johnny Sudenberg	PTS	10	31 May 1915	Hippodrome, Goldfield, Nevada U.S.	
10	Win	7–1–2	Emmanuel Campbell	TKO	4 (4)	26 Apr 1915	Airdrome Arena, Reno, Arizona, U.S.	
9	Loss	6–1–2	Jack Downey	PTS	10	5 Apr 1915	Garrick Theater, Salt Lake City, U.S.	
8	Win	6–0–2	Chief Gordon	KO	6	1 Apr 1915	Utah, U.S.	
7	Win	5–0–2	John Pierson	KO	7	3 Mar 1915	Utah, U.S.	
6	Draw	4–0–2	Chief Geronimo	PTS	4	26 Feb 1915	Pocatello, Idaho, U.S.	
5	Win	4–0–1	Joe Lyons	KO	9	2 Feb 1915	Utah, U.S.	
4	Win	3–0–1	Battling Johnson	KO	1	Jan 1915	Utah, U.S.	
3	Win	2–0–1	Billy Murphy	KO	1 (4)	30 Nov 1914	Garrick Theater, Salt Lake City, U.S.	
2	Win	1–0–1	Young Hancock	KO	1 (4)	2 Nov 1914	Garrick Theater, Salt Lake City, U.S.	
1	Draw	0–0–1	Young Herman	PTS	6	18 Aug 1914	Ramona Athletic Club Arena, Colorado Springs, Colorado, U.S.	

== Titles in boxing ==
=== Major world titles ===
- World heavyweight champion (200+ lbs)
- NYSAC heavyweight champion (Note: Inaugural champion.) (200+ lbs)
- NBA (WBA) heavyweight champion (200+ lbs)

=== The Ring magazine titles ===
- The Ring heavyweight champion (200+ lbs)

=== Undisputed titles ===
- Undisputed heavyweight champion (Note: Recognized as the first ever undisputed heavyweight champion.)

== Published works ==
- Dempsey, Lt. Jack; Cosneck, Bernard J. (2002) [1942]. How to Fight Tough (Softcover). Boulder, Colo: Paladin Press. p. 136. ISBN 978-1-58160-315-6.
- Dempsey, Jack; Menke, Frank G. (2002). How to Fight Tough (Print). Boulder, Colorado: Paladin Press. ISBN 1581603150.
- Dempsey, Jack (2015). Jack Dempsey's Championship Fighting: Explosive punching and aggressive defense. Simon & Schuster. p. 205. ISBN 978-1-5011-1148-8.
- Dempsey, Jack; Stearns, Myron Morris (1940). Round by Round (Hardcover). New York: Whittlesey House, McGraw-Hill. p. 285.
- Dempsey, Jack; Considine, Bob; Slocum, Bill (1960). Dempsey By The Man Himself As Told To Bob Considine and Bill Slocum (Hardcover). New York: Simon & Schuster.
- Dempsey, Jack; Dempsey, Barbara Piattelli (1977). Dempsey:The Autobiography of Jack Dempsey. London: W. H. Allen, Harper & Row. p. 320. ISBN 0-491-02301-4. ISBN 9780491023016

== See also ==
- List of heavyweight boxing champions

== Notes and references ==
=== References ===
Sporting positions
World boxing titles
Inaugural champion	The Ring heavyweight champion 1922 – September 23, 1926	Succeeded by Gene Tunney
Preceded by Jess Willard	World heavyweight champion July 4, 1919 – September 23, 1926	Succeeded by Gene Tunney
Records
Previous: John L. Sullivan; 2 566 days	Longest world heavyweight championship reign 2 638 days (7 years, 2 months, 19 days); 2 567 days on July 14, 1926; September 23, 1926 – September 12, 1944	Next: Joe Louis
Awards
Previous: David Lloyd George	Cover of Time magazine September 10, 1923	Next: Israel Zangwill
