= Terry Kellar =

American boxer

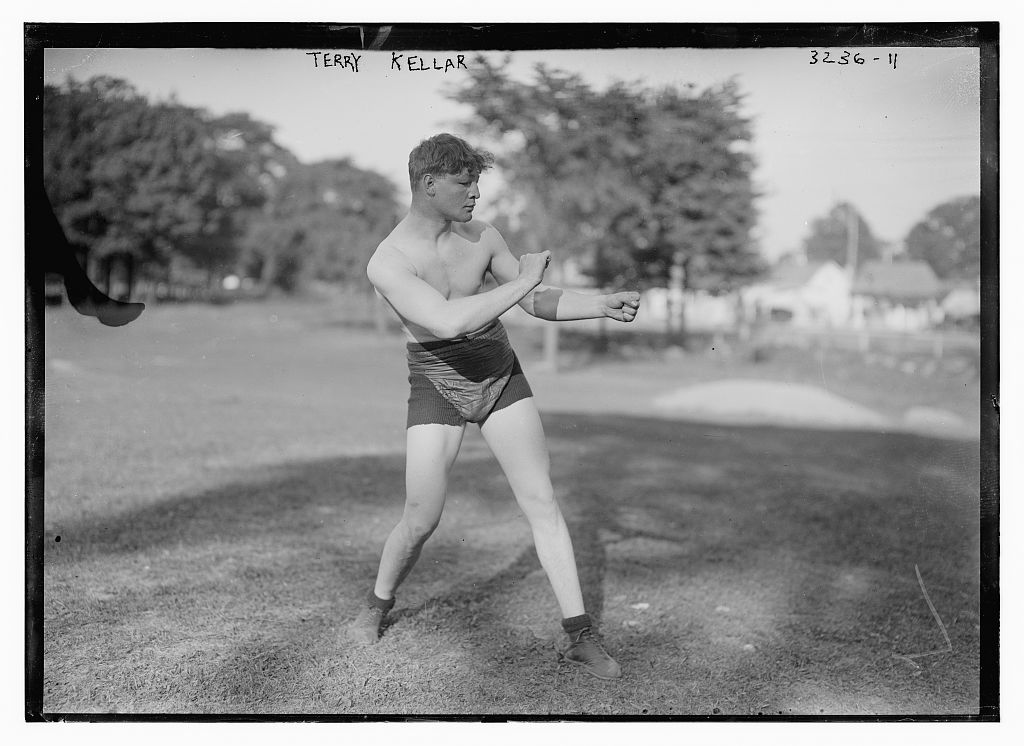
- Kellar in 1917

Personal information
- Nickname: Keller
- Born: Roy Walter Kellar; March 7, 1890 Omaha, Nebraska, U.S.
- Died: May 22, 1950 (aged 60) Camarillo, California, U.S.
- Height: 6 ft (183 cm)
- Weight: Lightweight; Welterweight; Middleweight

Boxing career
- Reach: ?
- Stance: Orthodox

Boxing record
- Total fights: 64
- Wins: 19
- Win by KO: 9
- Losses: 34
- Draws: 11

Terry Kellar (birth name Roy Walter Keller; March 7, 1890 – May 22, 1950) was an American professional boxer who won the lightweight, welterweight and middleweight championships.

== Professional boxing record ==
64 fights	19 wins	34 losses
By knockout	9	11
By decision	8	16
By disqualification	2	7
Draws	11	

No.	Result	Record	Opponent	Type	Round, time	Date	Location	Notes
64	Loss	19-34-11	(United States) Lee Anderson	PTS	4	17 May 1921	(United States) Pavilion, Seattle, Washington, US	
63	Loss	19-33-11	(United States) Sam Langford	PTS	6	9 December 1920	(United States) Aberdeen, Washington, US	
62	Loss	19-32-11	(United States) Lee Anderson	PTS	10	27 October 1920	(United States) Arena, Milwaukie, Oregon, US	
61	Win	19-31-11	(United States) Fred West	KO	2	6 October 1920	(United States) Armory, Ogden, Utah, US	
60	Loss	18-31-11	(United States) Andy Schmader	DQ	7	6 September 1920	(United States) Omaha, Nebraska, USA	
59	Loss	18-30-11	(United States) Homer Smith	TKO	5	15 June 1920	(United States) Berchel Theater, Des Moines, Iowa, US	
58	Loss	18-29-11	(United States) Homer Smith	KO	3	16 September 1919	(United States) Kalamazoo, Michigan, US	
57	Loss	18-28-11	(United States) Al Grayber	NWS	15	1 September 1919	(United States) Murphy St. Ball Park, Lima, Ohio, US	
56	Loss	18-27-11	(United States) Harry Greb	PTS	15	11 August 1919	(United States) Highland Park, Dayton, Ohio, US	
55	Loss	18-26-11	(United States) Martin Burke	PTS	15	9 June 1919	(United States) Tulane Arena, New Orleans, Louisiana, US	
54	Win	18-25-11	(United States) Jim Hosic	NWS	15	18 March 1919	(United States) Mishler Theatre, Altoona, Pennsylvania, US	
53	Loss	17-25-11	(United States) Al Grayber	NWS	6	17 March 1919	(United States) Duquesne Garden, Pittsburgh, Pennsylvania, US	
52	Loss	17-24-11	(United States) Jack Dempsey	TKO	5	24 August 1918	(United States) Westwood Field Gym, Dayton, Ohio, US	
51	Draw	17-24-11	(United States) Jim Downing	PTS	20	22 January 1918	(United States) Armory, Ogden, Utah, US	for All-Western Heavyweight Title
50	Loss	17-24-10	(United States) Harry Greb	NWS	10	4 January 1918	(United States) Orpheum Theater, McKeesport, Pennsylvania, US	
49	Loss	17-23-10	(United States) Bob Devere	DQ	2	29 October 1917	(United States) Gymnastic Club, Dayton, Ohio, US	
48	Loss	17-22-10	(United States) Al Reich	TKO	5	8 May 1917	(United States) Pioneer Sporting Club, New York, New York, US	
47	Loss	17-21-10	(United States) Homer Smith	NWS	10	24 April 1917	(United States) German Hall, Albany, New York, US	
46	Loss	17-20-10	(United States) Jim Coffey	RTD	3	27 March 1917	(United States) Brooklyn, New York, US	
45	Win	17-19-10	(United States) John Palmer	TKO	1	19 December 1916	(United States) Rose City A.C., Portland, Oregon, US	
44	Loss	16-19-10	(United States) Al Norton	PTS	4	22 November 1916	(United States) West Oakland Club, Oakland, California, US	
43	Loss	16-18-10	(United States) Jack Dempsey	PTS	10	7 October 1916	(United States) Bijo Hall, Eli, Nevada, US	
42	Loss	16-18-10	(United States) Bill Brennan	NWS	10	30 June 1916	(United States) Flower City A.C., Rochester, New York, US	
41	Loss	16-17-10	(United States) Tom McMahon	PTS	15	19 June 1916	(United States) Palace Theater, Baltimore, Maryland, US	
