= Andre Anderson (boxer) =

American boxer

Personal information
- Nationality: American
- Born: Frederick Boeseneilers; 1890 Chicago, Illinois
- Died: April 1, 1926
- Weight: Heavyweight

Boxing career
- Stance: South Paw Right Handed

Boxing record
- Total fights: 45
- Wins: 17
- Win by KO: 14
- Losses: 19
- Draws: 9
- No contests: 0

Andre Anderson (1890 in Chicago, Illinois – April 1, 1926) was an American boxer from 1915 until his death in 1926. He was best known for knocking down and fighting the World Heavyweight Champion Jack Dempsey to an official no decision (newspaper loss) on 24 June 1916 in a match held in the Bronx, New York.

It was alleged that Anderson would take dives for organized crime gamblers, which led to his shooting death, reportedly after refusing to partake in further bribes.

== Hemingway connection ==
Because of proximity (Chicago), profession and death at the hands of the mob, the young writer Ernest Hemingway was almost certainly aware of Anderson. Hemingway likely used him as the basis for Andreson 'the Swede' in his short stories 'A Matter of Colour' and 'The Killers'.
