= Bob Martin (boxer) =

American boxer

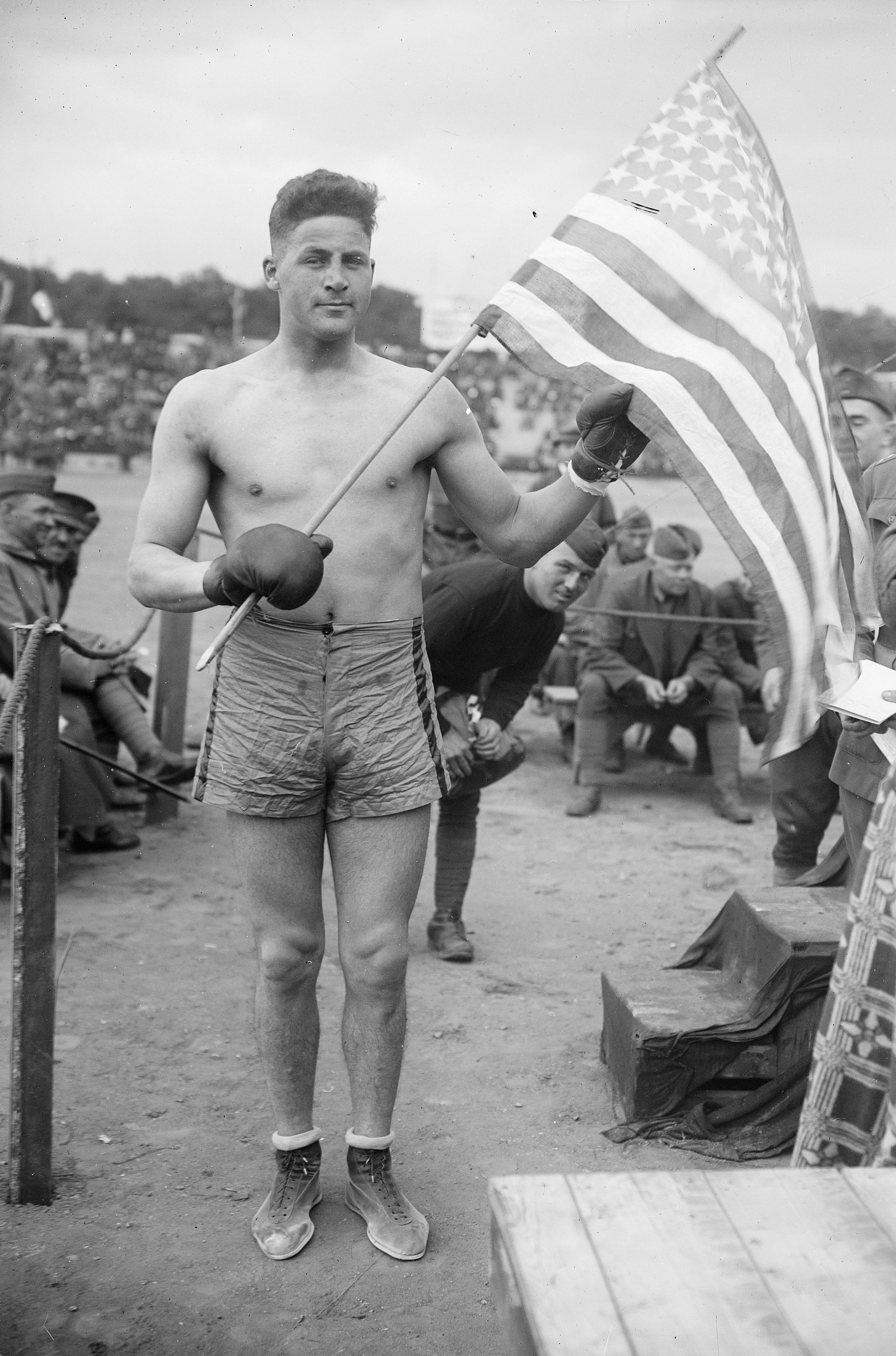
'Fighting' Bob Martin in 1919

'Fighting' Bob Martin (November 11, 1897 – 1978) was a heavyweight boxer who became the Heavyweight Champion of the American Expeditionary Forces and Inter-Allied Armies during World War I. He fought against future heavyweight champion, Gene Tunney, in 1918, but lost in 4 rounds.
