= Arthur Pelkey =

Canadian boxer (1884–1921)

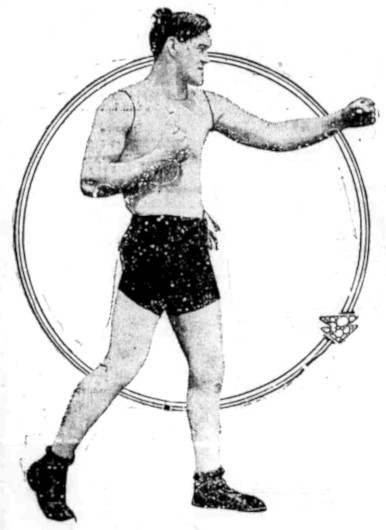
- Pelkey in 1913

Personal information
- Born: Andrew Arthur Pelletier; October 27, 1882 Chatham, Ontario, Canada
- Died: February 18, 1921 (aged 36) Windsor, Ontario, Canada
- Height: 6 ft 1 1/2 in (1.87 m)
- Weight: Heavyweight

Boxing career
- Reach: 77 in (196 cm)
- Stance: Orthodox

Boxing record
- Total fights: 56
- Wins: 27
- Win by KO: 17
- Losses: 23
- Draws: 6

Arthur Pelkey (27 October 1884 – 18 February 1921) was a Canadian boxer who fought from 1910 to 1920. Born Andrew Arthur Pelletier in Pain Court, Ontario, the 6′ 1½″ Pelkey fought in the heavyweight division at a weight of between 206 and 210 lbs. He was one of the "White Hopes" of the time that African American Jack Johnson was the world heavyweight champion.

The height of his pro career and its nadir happened simultaneously when on 24 May 1913, he met Luther McCarty at Tommy Burns's Arena in Calgary, Alberta for McCarty's World White Heavyweight title. Burns had been the world heavyweight champ who had lost his title to Jack Johnson, and the title had been created to crown a white heavyweight champ in light of the failures of successive White Hopes to wrest the title from Johnson.

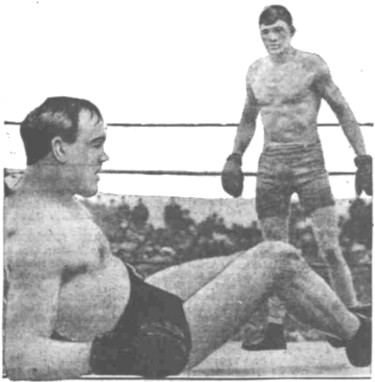
Gunboat Smith stands over a knocked-down Pelkey during a match on January 1, 1914 in San Francisco, California. Smith defeated Pelkey for the World White Heavyweight Championship.

Approximately two minutes into the first round of the scheduled 10-round bout, the 210 lbs. Pelkey K.O.-ed the 200 lbs. McCarty. Eight minutes later, McCarty was pronounced dead. Pelkey reportedly broke down and wept when told of McCarty's death. Tommy Burns's Arena burned down the following day, likely as a result of arson.

A coroner's jury ruled that McCarty had died of a cerebral hemorrhage. The ruling held that he had not been killed by a blow delivered by Pelkey but that the hemorrhage likely was the result of a previous injury. Pelkey later claimed that his legal expenses linked to McCarty's death bankrupted him.

Pelkey reportedly was never the same after killing McCarty. He lost the white heavyweight title to Gunboat Smith on New Year's Day 1914 at Coffroth's Arena in Daly City, California United States via a T.K.O. in the 15th round of the scheduled 20-round bout.

When he retired in 1920, he had compiled an official career record of 27 wins (17 by K.O.) against 21 losses (having been K.O.-ed 16 times) and three draws. This also included 10 newspaper decisions: five wins, two losses and three draws.

Titles in pretence
Preceded by Luther McCarty	World White Heavyweight Champion; May 24, 1913 – January 1, 1914	Succeeded by Gunboat Smith
