= Hozier (disambiguation) =

Hozier (Andrew John Hozier-Byrne, born 1990) is an Irish musician.

Hozier may also refer to:

== People ==
- Ambroise-Louis-Marie d'Hozier (1764–1846), last of the juges d'armes of France
- Charles-René d'Hozier (1640–1732), French historical commentator
- Clementine Spencer-Churchill, Baroness Spencer-Churchill (born Clementine Ogilvy Hozier; 1885–1977), British life peer and wife of Winston Churchill
- Henry Montague Hozier (1838–1907), secretary of Lloyd's of London and legal father of Clementine Churchill (née Hozier)
- James Hozier, 2nd Baron Newlands (1851–1929), Scottish civil servant, diplomat and politician
- Louis-Pierre d'Hozier (1685–1767), juge d'armes of France
- Pierre d'Hozier (1592–1660), French genealogist
- William Hozier, 1st Baron Newlands (1825–1906), Scottish soldier and businessman

== Other ==
- Hozier (album), 2014 album by Hozier
- Hozier baronets of the UK peerage
- Hozier Islands, Nunavut, Canada

== See also ==
- Hojer (disambiguation)
- Hoosier (disambiguation)
- Hosier (disambiguation)
