= Hoosier (disambiguation) =

Hoosier most commonly refers to a person from the U.S. state of Indiana, known as The Hoosier State.

Hoosier or Hoosiers may also refer to:

== Places ==
=== Canada ===
- Hoosier, Saskatchewan

=== United States ===
- Hoosier, Illinois
- Hoosier, Indiana
- Hoosier, Wisconsin
- Hoosier Creek, in Iowa, see List of rivers in Iowa
- Hoosier Pass, a high mountain pass in central Colorado
- Hoosier Township (disambiguation)

== Other ==
- Hoosier (1851 sidewheeler), a steamboat on the Willamette River in Oregon
- Hoosiers (film), a 1986 film based on the Milan High School Indians
- Hoosier (train) (1911–1959)
- Hoosier Bearcat, nickname of Ernest Cutler Price (1891–1942), American boxer
- The Hoosiers, an English band originally formed while in Indiana
- Indiana Hoosiers, the sports teams and players of Indiana University Bloomington
- Hoosier Racing Tire, a tire manufacturer
- Hoosier cabinet, a free-standing kitchen cupboard
- Hoosier, the Secret Service code name for Mike Pence

== See also ==
- Hosier
- Hooser
- Hoser
- Hoosierville, Indiana
- Hozier (disambiguation)
