= Charley Weinert =

American boxer (1895–1969)

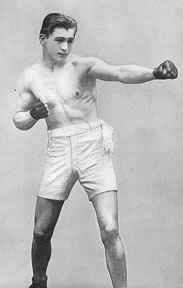

Personal information
- Nickname: Newark Adonis
- Born: October 22, 1895
- Died: May 1, 1969 (aged 73)
- Weight: Heavyweight; Light heavyweight

Boxing career

Boxing record
- Total fights: 98
- Wins: 73
- Win by KO: 27
- Losses: 17
- Draws: 8

Charley Weinert (October 22, 1895 – May 1, 1969) was a New Jersey boxer, known as the Newark Adonis. He fought most major heavyweights in his era, including two fights for the light-heavyweight championship against Jack Dillon. He was inducted into the New Jersey Boxing Hall of Fame in 1970.

== Professional career ==
Weinert either won or forced a draw is his first 31 fights. He fought Gunboat Smith to a draw, then in a rematch won by newspaper decision.

The Newark Evening Star, on December 30, 1913, following his victory over Tommy Madden:

Of all the "white hopes" I have seen, outside, perhaps, of Gunboat Smith, Weinert looks to be easily the best of the lot. ... From what he has been showing in the ring, Weinert with a year or so of age and fifteen pounds, say, of weight, has one grand chance to become the greatest heavyweight pugilist that has ever grazed the prize ring.

In 1914 and 1915, Weinert twice fought for the World Light-Heavyweight Championship and was twice defeated by Jack Dillon.

Weinert fought most major heavyweights in his era including: Gene Tunney, Harry Greb, Luis Angel Firpo, Jack Sharkey, Battling Levinsky, Billy Miske and Fred Fulton.
