= Louis-Pierre d'Hozier =

French nobleman and genealogist (1685–1767)

Louis Pierre d'Hozier
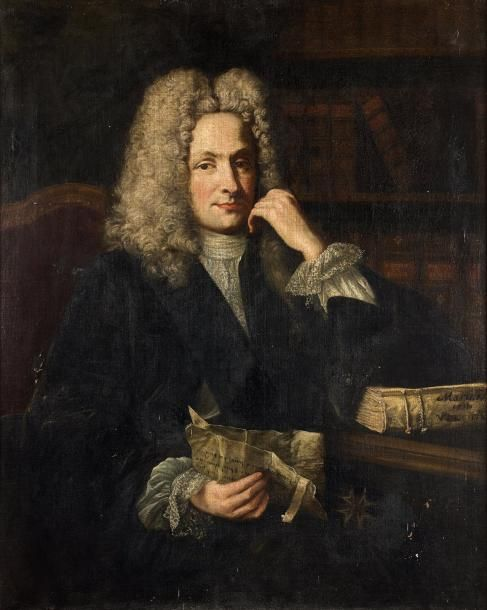
- Born: 20 November 1685; Paris
- Died: 25 September 1767 (aged 81); Paris
- Occupation: Genealogist
- Notable work: Armorial général, ou registre de la noblesse de France (1738–1768)
- Title: Juge d'armes de France
- Predecessor: Charles-René d'Hozier
- Relatives: Pierre d'Hozier (grandfather); Charles-René d'Hozier (uncle); Ambroise-Louis-Marie d'Hozier (nephew)

Louis Pierre d'Hozier (20 November 1685 – 25 September 1767) was a French nobleman and genealogist and the fourth holder of the post of juge d'armes de France. He was born and died in Paris.

The grandson of Pierre d'Hozier and nephew of Charles René d'Hozier, he collaborated with his youngest son Antoine Marie d'Hozier to produce the 10-volume l'Armorial de France (1738-1768), covering most of the French noble families of the time. He succeeded his uncle Charles in the post of juge d'armes de France.

He published the Armorial général, ou registre de la noblesse de France (10 vols, 1738–1768), which must not be confounded with the publication written by his uncle, inasmuch as it related solely to noble families and was not an official collection.

Complete copies of this work, which should contain six registres, are comparatively rare. A seventh registre, forming vol. xi, prepared by Ambroise-Louis-Marie, nephew of Louis Pierre, was published in 1847 by comte Charles d'Hozier. Louis Pierre died on 25 September 1767.

His eldest son, Antoine Marie d'Hozier de Sérigny (1721 – c. 1810), was his father's collaborator and continuator; and his fourth son, Jean-François Louis, wrote an account of the Knights of St Michael in the province of Poitou, which was published in 1896 by the vicomte P de Chabot.
