= Billy Miske =

American boxer (1894–1924)

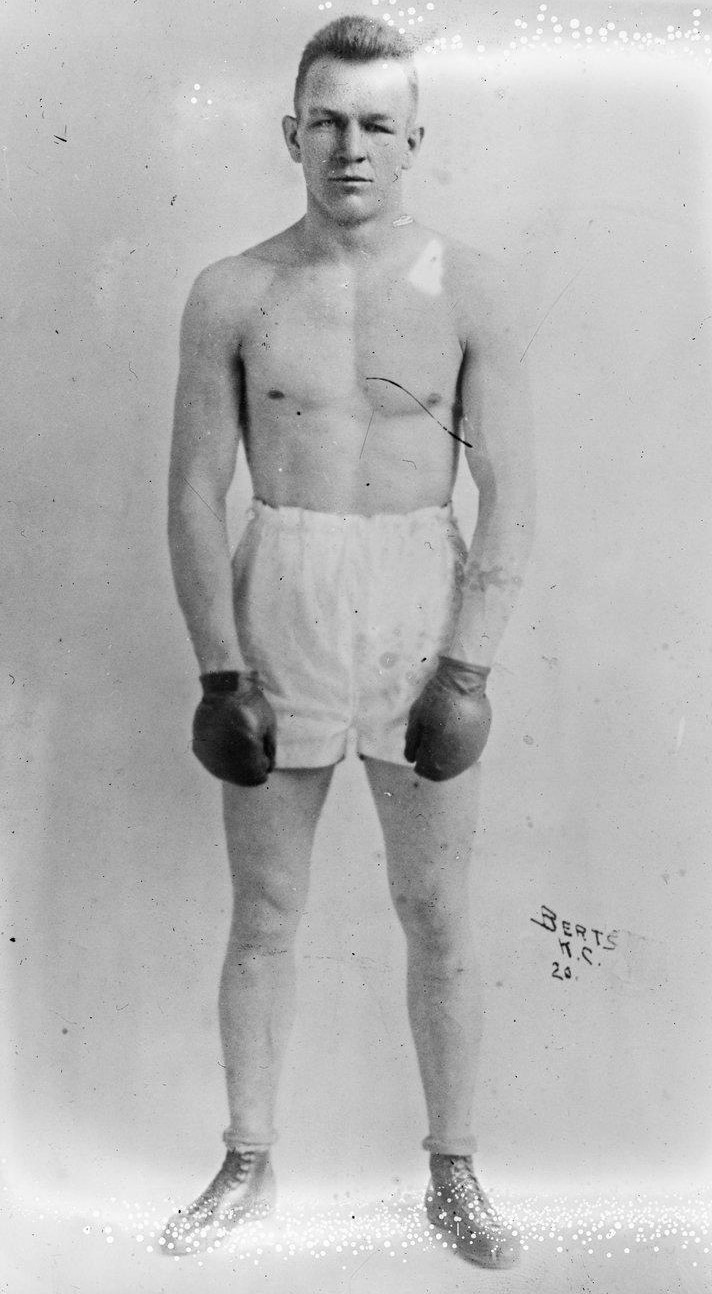

Personal information
- Nickname: The St. Paul Thunderbolt
- Born: William Arthur Miske; April 12, 1894 St. Paul, Minnesota, U.S.
- Died: January 1, 1924 (aged 29)
- Height: 6 ft 0 1/2 in (1.84 m)
- Weight: Light Heavyweight; Heavyweight

Boxing career
- Reach: 76 in (193 cm)

Boxing record
- Total fights: 105
- Wins: 74
- Win by KO: 34
- Losses: 13
- Draws: 16

Billy Miske, alias The Saint Paul Thunderbolt (April 12, 1894 – January 1, 1924), was a professional boxer from Saint Paul, Minnesota. During his tenure as a pugilist he had multiple-bout series with a plethora of all-time greats including Harry Greb, Jack Dempsey, Fred Fulton, Jack Dillon, Tommy Gibbons, Bill Brennan and Battling Levinsky, among others. Despite a career shortened by illness and an early death, statistical website BoxRec still lists Miske as the No. 26 ranked heavyweight of all time.

== Professional boxing career ==
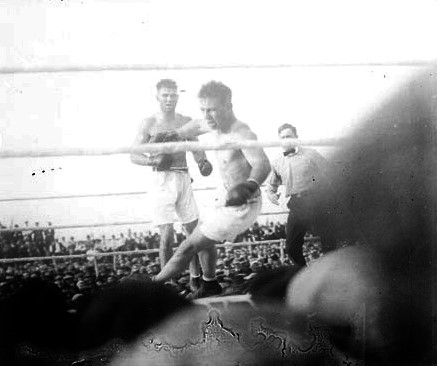
Miske falling to the mat during his 1920 bout with Jack Dempsey

An American of German descent, Miske stood at 6'0" and over the course of his career weighed between 158 and 190 lbs. He was managed by John Pearl "J.P" Smith (1913–18) and Jack Reddy (1918–23).

Miske was born in St. Paul, Minnesota. He began his career as a middleweight. During his career, he competed successfully as a light-heavyweight and heavyweight, defeating many well-known fighters. On September 6, 1920, Miske lost to Jack Dempsey in the third round of a fight to decide the World Heavyweight Boxing title. It was the first heavyweight title match to be broadcast on radio, and it was the only time Billy Miske was ever knocked out.

== Illness and death ==
Miske fought his last bout against Bill Brennan, whom he met on November 7, 1923. At this point in his life, Miske knew he did not have much time left before his kidneys gave out (doctors had told him he had only months to live because of his Bright's Disease). Due to his family's economic situation, however, Miske decided he had to step into the ring one more time. His health prevented him from training for the fight. Amazingly, though, Miske knocked Brennan out in the fourth round. Miske died in St. Paul, Minnesota of kidney failure less than 2 months later on January 1, 1924.

== Legacy ==
Miske's enduring legacy is that of an underappreciated fighter. It is argued that Miske deserved, but never received, title matches against Jack Dillon, Battling Levinsky and Georges Carpentier. His three recorded losses are against Hall of Famers Jack Dempsey, Kid Norfolk and Tommy Gibbons, while his list of defeated opponents boasts some of the most storied names in boxing history. Miske's final professional record was 72-15-14 with 33 wins by knockout. On December 8, 2009, it was announced that Miske would be inducted into the International Boxing Hall of Fame in 2010. On September 28, 2012 Miske was inducted into the Minnesota Boxing Hall of Fame.

== Professional boxing record ==
103 fights	43 wins	3 losses
By knockout	32	1
By decision	8	2
By disqualification	3	0
Draws	2	
Newspaper decisions/draws	55	

Key to abbreviations used for results
DQ	Disqualification	RTD	Corner retirement
KO	Knockout	SD	Split decision / split draw
MD	Majority decision / majority draw	TD	Technical decision / technical draw
NC	No contest	TKO	Technical knockout
PTS	Points decision	UD	Unanimous decision / unanimous draw

Boxing record
No.	Result	Record	Opponent	Type	Round(s), time	Date	Location	Notes
103	Win	43–3–2 (55)	(United States) Bill Brennan	KO	4 (10)	Nov 7, 1923	(United States) City Auditorium, Omaha, Nebraska	
102	Win	42–3–2 (55)	(United States) Harry Foley	KO	4 (10), 0:42	Jan 12, 1923	(United States) City Auditorium, Omaha, Nebraska	
101	Loss	41–3–2 (55)	(United States) Tommy Gibbons	UD	10	Dec 15, 1922	(United States) St. Paul Auditorium, Saint Paul, Minnesota	
100	Win	41–2–2 (55)	(United States) Bud Ryder	TKO	3 (10)	Nov 11, 1922	(United States) Grand Forks Auditorium, Grand Forks, North Dakota	
99	Win	40–2–2 (55)	(United States) Tommy Gibbons	DQ	10 (15), 0:27	Oct 13, 1922	(United States) Madison Square Garden, New York City, New York	
98	Draw	39–2–2 (55)	(United States) Bob Roper	PTS	12	Sep 4, 1922	(United States) Coliseum, Oklahoma City, Oklahoma	
97	Win	39–2–1 (55)	(United States) Fred Fulton	KO	1 (10)	Aug 25, 1922	(United States) Lexington Park, Saint Paul, Minnesota	
96	Win	38–2–1 (55)	(United States) Martin Burke	NWS	12	Jul 10, 1922	(United States) Stockyards Stadium, Denver, Colorado	
95	Win	38–2–1 (54)	(United States) Willie Meehan	KO	1 (10), 2:40	Jul 3, 1922	(United States) Coliseum, Oklahoma City, Oklahoma	
94	Win	37–2–1 (54)	(United States) Homer Smith	KO	1 (12)	Jun 23, 1922	(United States) Riverside Arena, Covington, Kentucky	
93	Win	36–2–1 (54)	(United States) Bob Roper	PTS	10	May 29, 1922	(United States) Dyckman Oval, Upper Manhattan, New York	
92	Win	35–2–1 (54)	(United States) Martin Burke	PTS	15	Apr 27, 1922	(United States) Orleans A.C., New Orleans, Louisiana	
91	Win	34–2–1 (54)	(United States) Billy Shade	TKO	2 (12)	Apr 10, 1922	(United States) Oak Hill Auditorium, Youngstown, Ohio	
90	Win	33–2–1 (54)	(United States) Al Roberts	KO	2 (10), 2:53	Mar 2, 1922	(United States) Madison Square Garden, New York City, New York	
89	Win	32–2–1 (54)	(United States) Bob Roper	DQ	6 (8)	Feb 20, 1922	(United States) Olympia A.C., Philadelphia, Pennsylvania	
88	Win	31–2–1 (54)	(Canada) Jack Renault	TKO	13 (15)	Jan 28, 1922	(United States) Clermont Avenue Skating Rink, Brooklyn, New York	
87	Win	30–2–1 (54)	(Hungary) Charley Weinert	NWS	12	Jan 16, 1922	(United States) Broad A.C., Newark, New Jersey	
86	Win	30–2–1 (53)	(Italy) Tony Melchior	TKO	4 (10)	Nov 11, 1921	(United States) Columbus, Ohio	
85	Win	29–2–1 (53)	(Canada) Jack Renault	NWS	8	Jul 2, 1921	(United States) Boyle's Thirty Acres, Jersey City, New Jersey	
84	Win	29–2–1 (52)	(United States) Bill Brennan	NWS	10	Jun 8, 1921	(United States) Lexington Park, Saint Paul, Minnesota	
83	Win	29–2–1 (51)	(United States) Tom McCarty	KO	2 (10)	May 9, 1921	(United States) St. Paul Auditorium, Saint Paul, Minnesota	
82	Win	28–2–1 (51)	(United States) Farmer Lodge	KO	4 (10)	Mar 7, 1921	(United States) St. Paul Auditorium, Saint Paul, Minnesota	
81	Win	27–2–1 (51)	(United States) Lee Anderson	PTS	10	Feb 9, 1921	(United States) Arena, Milwaukie, Oregon	
80	Loss	26–2–1 (51)	(United States) Jack Dempsey	KO	3 (10), 1:13	Sep 6, 1920	(United States) Floyd Fitzsimmons Arena, Benton Harbor, Michigan	For world heavyweight title
79	Win	26–1–1 (51)	(United States) Jack Moran	TKO	2 (10)	Jun 11, 1920	(United States) Nicollet Park, Minneapolis, Minnesota	
78	Loss	25–1–1 (51)	(United States) Battling Levinsky	NWS	12	Jul 7, 1919	(United States) Rossford Arena, Rossford, Ohio	
77	Draw	25–1–1 (50)	(United States) Bill Brennan	NWS	8	Jun 25, 1919	(United States) Cardinal Field, St. Louis, Missouri	
76	Draw	25–1–1 (49)	(United States) Tommy Gibbons	NWS	10	Jun 19, 1919	(United States) Nicollet Park, Minneapolis, Minnesota	
75	Loss	25–1–1 (48)	(United States) Kid Norfolk	NWS	10	Jun 9, 1919	(United States) Forbes Field, Pittsburgh, Pennsylvania	
74	Win	25–1–1 (47)	(United States) Willie Meehan	NWS	10	Jun 6, 1919	(United States) St. Paul Auditorium, Saint Paul, Minnesota	
73	Win	25–1–1 (46)	(United States) Bill Brennan	PTS	15	Apr 28, 1919	(United States) Tulsa Convention Hall, Tulsa, Oklahoma	
72	Loss	24–1–1 (46)	(United States) Harry Greb	NWS	10	Mar 31, 1919	(United States) Duquesne Garden, Pittsburgh, Pennsylvania	
71	Win	24–1–1 (45)	(United Kingdom) Tom Cowler	KO	4 (10)	Mar 28, 1919	(United States) Albaugh Theater, Baltimore, Maryland	
70	Win	23–1–1 (45)	(United Kingdom) Tom Cowler	NWS	6	Jan 11, 1919	(United States) National A.C., Philadelphia, Pennsylvania	
69	Win	23–1–1 (44)	(United States) Gus Christie	TKO	10 (10)	Dec 27, 1918	(United States) Elite Rink, Milwaukee, Wisconsin	
68	Win	22–1–1 (44)	(United States) Fireman Jim Flynn	KO	2 (15), 0:35	Dec 16, 1918	(United States) Tulsa Convention Hall, Tulsa, Oklahoma	
67	Loss	21–1–1 (44)	(United States) Jack Dempsey	NWS	6	Nov 28, 1918	(United States) Olympia A.C., Philadelphia, Pennsylvania	
66	Win	21–1–1 (43)	(United States) Tom McMahon	NWS	6	Nov 18, 1918	(United States) Forbes Field, Pittsburgh, Pennsylvania	
65	Win	21–1–1 (42)	(United States) Harry Greb	NWS	10	Sep 21, 1918	(United States) Forbes Field, Pittsburgh, Pennsylvania	
64	Draw	21–1–1 (41)	(United States) George Ashe	NWS	4	Jul 16, 1918	(United States) Madison Square Garden, New York City, New York	
63	Win	21–1–1 (40)	(United Kingdom) Bartley Madden	NWS	8	Jul 15, 1918	(United States) Armory A.A. Outdoor Arena, Jersey City, New Jersey	
62	Win	21–1–1 (39)	(United States) Gunboat Smith	NWS	8	Jul 12, 1918	(United States) International League Ballpark, Jersey City, New Jersey	
61	Win	21–1–1 (38)	(United States) Edward KO Kruvosky	PTS	4	Jun 14, 1918	(United States) Dreamland Rink, San Francisco, California	
60	Draw	20–1–1 (38)	(United States) Willie Meehan	PTS	4	Jun 7, 1918	(United States) Shrine Temple, Los Angeles, California	
59	Win	20–1 (38)	(United States) Henry Hendricks	TKO	2 (4)	May 31, 1918	(United States) San Francisco Civic Auditorium, San Francisco, California	
58	Draw	19–1 (38)	(United States) Jack Dempsey	NWS	10	May 3, 1918	(United States) St. Paul Auditorium, Saint Paul, Minnesota	
57	Win	19–1 (37)	(United States) Gunboat Smith	PTS	10	Apr 12, 1918	(United States) Municipal Auditorium, Atlanta, Georgia	
56	Win	18–1 (37)	(United Kingdom) Tom Cowler	TKO	5 (12)	Apr 8, 1918	(United States) Arcadia Rink, Minneapolis, Minnesota	
55	Win	17–1 (37)	(United States) Gus Christie	NWS	10	Feb 27, 1918	(United States) Opera House, Superior, Wisconsin	
54	Draw	17–1 (36)	(United States) Fred Fulton	NWS	10	Jan 18, 1918	(United States) St. Paul Auditorium, Saint Paul, Minnesota	
53	Win	17–1 (35)	(United States) Jack Dillon	NWS	10	Nov 13, 1917	(United States) Broadway Auditorium, Brooklyn, New York	
52	Win	17–1 (34)	(Canada) Bert Kenny	TKO	5 (12)	Oct 30, 1917	(United States) Arena (Armory A.A.), Boston, Massachusetts	
51	Loss	16–1 (34)	(United States) Kid Norfolk	PTS	12	Oct 16, 1917	(United States) Arena (Armory A.A.), Boston, Massachusetts	
50	Win	16–0 (34)	(Hungary) Charley Weinert	NWS	10	Oct 2, 1917	(United States) Broadway Arena, Brooklyn, New York	
49	Win	16–0 (33)	(United States) Carl Morris	NWS	10	Sep 28, 1917	(United States) Harlem S.C., Manhattan, New York	
48	Win	16–0 (32)	(Canada) Bert Kenny	NWS	10	Sep 18, 1917	(United States) Broadway Arena, Brooklyn, New York	
47	Win	16–0 (31)	(United States) Joe Bonds	KO	1 (10)	Jul 24, 1917	(United States) Broadway Arena, Brooklyn, New York	
46	Loss	15–0 (31)	(United States) Battling Levinsky	NWS	10	Feb 27, 1917	(United States) St. Paul Auditorium, Saint Paul, Minnesota	
45	Win	15–0 (30)	(United States) Jack Dillon	NWS	10	Jan 16, 1917	(United States) Broadway Arena, Brooklyn, New York	
44	Win	15–0 (29)	(Hungary) Charley Weinert	NWS	12	Jan 12, 1917	(United States) Harlem S.C., Manhattan, New York	
43	Win	15–0 (28)	(Greece) George KO Brown	NWS	12	Jan 1, 1917	(United States) Broadway Arena, Brooklyn, New York	
42	Win	15–0 (27)	(United States) Jack Dillon	NWS	10	Dec 19, 1916	(United States) Broadway Arena, Brooklyn, New York	
41	Win	15–0 (26)	(United States) Larry Williams	NWS	6	Nov 27, 1916	(United States) Olympia A.C., Philadelphia, Pennsylvania	
40	Win	15–0 (25)	(United States) Bob Moha	NWS	10	Nov 17, 1916	(United States) Broadway Arena, Brooklyn, New York	
39	Win	15–0 (24)	(United States) Tim O'Neil	KO	6 (10)	Nov 9, 1916	(United States) Clermont Avenue Skating Rink, Brooklyn, New York	
38	Win	14–0 (24)	(United States) Battling Levinsky	NWS	10	Oct 30, 1916	(United States) Clermont Avenue Skating Rink, Brooklyn, New York	
37	Win	14–0 (23)	(United States) Battling Levinsky	NWS	10	Oct 12, 1916	(United States) Clermont Avenue Skating Rink, Brooklyn, New York	
36	Win	14–0 (22)	(United States) Jim Barry	TKO	6 (10)	Sep 21, 1916	(United States) Clermont Avenue Skating Rink, Brooklyn, New York	
35	Win	13–0 (22)	(United States) Johnny Howard	KO	10 (10)	Aug 31, 1916	(United States) Clermont Avenue Skating Rink, Brooklyn, New York	
34	Win	12–0 (22)	(United States) Jack Hubbard	KO	9 (10)	Jun 22, 1916	(United States) Clermont Avenue Skating Rink, Brooklyn, New York	
33	Loss	11–0 (22)	(United States) Jack Dillon	NWS	10	Apr 14, 1916	(United States) St. Paul Auditorium, Saint Paul, Minnesota	
32	Win	11–0 (21)	(United States) Dick Gilbert	PTS	15	Feb 29, 1916	(United States) National A.C., Denver, Colorado	
31	Win	10–0 (21)	(United States) Jack Dillon	NWS	10	Jan 28, 1916	(United States) Opera House, Superior, Wisconsin	
30	Win	10–0 (20)	(United States) Frank Hoe	KO	2 (10)	Dec 28, 1915	(United States) Marshfield, Wisconsin	
29	Win	9–0 (20)	(Canada) Jack Clements	KO	8 (10)	Dec 17, 1915	(United States) Minneapolis Armory, Minneapolis, Minnesota	
28	Draw	8–0 (20)	(United States) Terry Kellar	NWS	10	Dec 3, 1915	(United States) Opera House, Superior, Wisconsin	
27	Draw	8–0 (19)	(Greece) George KO Brown	NWS	12	Nov 1, 1915	(Canada) Winnipeg, Manitoba	
26	Win	8–0 (18)	(United States) Jack Lester	KO	2 (10)	Sep 10, 1915	(United States) St. Paul Auditorium, Saint Paul, Minnesota	
25	Draw	7–0 (18)	(United States) Gus Christie	NWS	10	Aug 24, 1915	(United States) Riverside A.C., Dubuque, Iowa	
24	Loss	7–0 (17)	(United States) Tommy Gibbons	NWS	10	Jul 12, 1915	(United States) St. Paul Auditorium, Saint Paul, Minnesota	
23	Win	7–0 (16)	(Greece) George KO Brown	NWS	10	Apr 28, 1915	(United States) Acme Hall, Platteville, Wisconsin	
22	Win	7–0 (15)	(United States) Mike O'Dowd	NWS	10	Apr 6, 1915	(United States) Hudson Arena, Hudson, Wisconsin	
21	Win	7–0 (14)	(United States) Eddie Nearing	DQ	6 (10)	Mar 23, 1915	(United States) Hudson Arena, Hudson, Wisconsin	
20	Win	6–0 (14)	(United States) Gus Christie	NWS	8	Mar 16, 1915	(United States) Milwaukee Auditorium, Milwaukee, Wisconsin	
19	Draw	6–0 (13)	(United States) Mike Hirsch	NWS	6	Feb 25, 1915	(United States) Milwaukee Auditorium, Milwaukee, Wisconsin	
18	Loss	6–0 (12)	(United States) Jack McCarron	NWS	6	Jan 16, 1915	(United States) National A.C., Philadelphia, Pennsylvania	
17	Draw	6–0 (11)	(United States) Harry Greb	NWS	6	Jan 12, 1915	(United States) Fairmont A.C., Philadelphia, Pennsylvania	
16	Win	6–0 (10)	(United States) Billy Maxwell	NWS	6	Jan 9, 1915	(United States) National A.C., Philadelphia, Pennsylvania	
15	Win	6–0 (9)	(United States) Billy Maxwell	NWS	6	Jan 1, 1915	(United States) National A.C., Philadelphia, Pennsylvania	
14	Draw	6–0 (8)	(United States) Al Thiel	NWS	10	Dec 10, 1914	(United States) Academy of Music, Pottsville, Pennsylvania	
13	Win	6–0 (7)	(United States) Ralph Erne	TKO	4 (10)	Nov 23, 1914	(United States) O'Hara Theatre, Shenandoah, Pennsylvania	
12	Win	5–0 (7)	(United States) Jimmy Dougherty	TKO	3 (6)	Nov 14, 1914	(United States) National A.C., Philadelphia, Pennsylvania	
11	Win	4–0 (7)	(United States) Theodore Thompson	KO	2 (6)	Jun 15, 1914	(United States) St. Paul Auditorium, Saint Paul, Minnesota	
10	Win	3–0 (7)	(United States) Young Griffo	NWS	10	Jun 1, 1914	(United States) O'Hara Theatre, Shenandoah, Pennsylvania	
9	Draw	3–0 (6)	(United States) Jack McCarron	NWS	10	May 26, 1914	(United States) Academy of Music, Pottsville, Pennsylvania	
8	Draw	3–0 (5)	(United States) George Ashe	NWS	6	May 16, 1914	(United States) National A.C., Philadelphia, Pennsylvania	
7	Loss	3–0 (4)	(United States) Tommy Gibbons	NWS	10	Mar 24, 1914	(United States) Hudson Arena, Hudson, Wisconsin	
6	Draw	3–0 (3)	(United States) Spike Kelly	NWS	10	Feb 17, 1914	(United States) Eighth Street Arena, Superior, Wisconsin	
5	Draw	3–0 (2)	(United States) Bill Scott	NWS	10	Sep 30, 1913	(United States) Superior Athletic Arena, Superior, Wisconsin	
4	Win	3–0 (1)	(United States) Danny Ritt	TKO	2 (10)	Jun 10, 1913	(United States) Opera House, Superior, Wisconsin	
3	Draw	2–0 (1)	(United States) Theodore Thompson	NWS	6	Apr 29, 1913	(United States) Opera House, Superior, Wisconsin	
2	Win	2–0	(United States) Soldier Gregory	KO	2 (6)	Apr 7, 1913	(United States) Opera House, Superior, Wisconsin	
1	Win	1–0	(United States) Joe Christie	PTS	6	Mar 5, 1913	(United States) Opera House, Superior, Wisconsin	Professional debut
