= Hosier (surname) =

Hosier is an occupational surname. It originates from either the Old English word "hosa", meaning a maker or seller of legwear, or from the French word "heuse", later "hosier", meaning a maker of footwear. The modern surname appears to derive from the English meaning but uses the French spelling.

A variant origin of the Hosier surname occurred sometime between 1850 and 1950 with conversion of the surname "Hueshaw" to "Hosier".

Notable people with the surname include:

- David Hosier (1955–2024), American convicted murderer
- Edward Hosier (died 1571), English politician
- Francis Hosier (1673–1727), British Royal Navy officer
- "Black Harry" Hosier (c. 1750–1806), a black Methodist preacher during the Second Great Awakening
- Gerald D. Hosier (born 1941), American lawyer
- John Hosier (1928–2000), English musician
- Tom Hosier (1942–2015), American football coach

== See also ==
- Hozier (disambiguation)
