= Charles-René d'Hozier =

French historical commentator

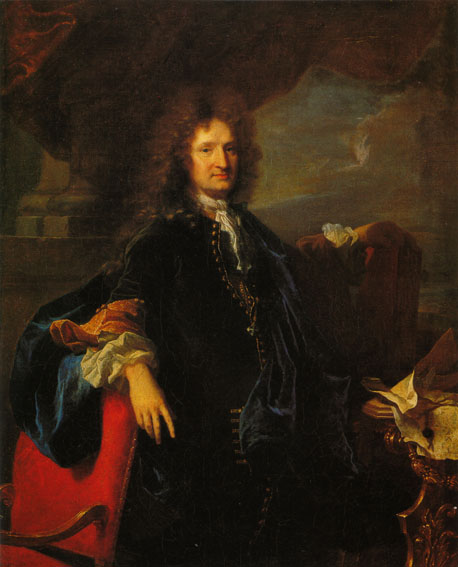
Charles-René d'Hozier by Hyacinthe Rigaud

Charles-René d'Hozier (24 February 1640 – 13 February 1732) was a French historical commentator. The younger son of Pierre d'Hozier, he was the true successor of his father.

In addition to his commentary appended to Antoine Varillas's history of King Charles IX (1686 ed.), he published Recherches sur la noblesse de Champagne (1673). On the promulgation in 1696 of an edict directing all who had armorial bearings to register them on payment of 20 livres, he was employed to collect the declarations returned in the various généralités, and established the Armorial général de France. This work, which contained not only the armorial bearings of noble families, but also of those commoners who were entitled to bear arms, is not complete, inasmuch as many refused to register their arms, either from vanity or from a desire to evade the fee.

d'Hozier Coat of Arms

The collection (now in the Bibliothèque nationale de France) consists of 34 volumes of text and 35 of coloured armorial bearings, and, in spite of its deficiencies, is a useful store of information for the history of the old French families. It contains 60,000 names, grouped according to provinces and provincial subdivisions. The sections relating to Burgundy and Franche-Comté were published by Henri Bouchot (1875-1876): those relating to the généralité of Limoges, by Moreau de Pravieux (1895); and those for the election of Reims, by P. Cosset (1903).

In 1717, in consequence of a quarrel with his nephew Louis Pierre, son of Louis Roger, Charles sold his collection to the king. It then comprised 160 portfolios of genealogical papers arranged alphabetically, 175 volumes of documents, and numerous printed books profusely annotated. In 1720, it was inventoried by Pierre de Clairambault, royal genealogist, who added a certain number of genealogies taken from the papers of Gaignières, increasing the total to 217 boxes and portfolios. Thus originated the Cabinet des titres of the Bibliothèque Nationale. Charles subsequently became reconciled to Ambroise-Louis-Marie d'Hozier, his nephew, to whom he left all the papers he had accumulated from the date of the quarrel until his death, which occurred in Paris.

He was succeeded as juge d’armes by his nephew, Louis Pierre.
