= Jack Dillon =

American boxer

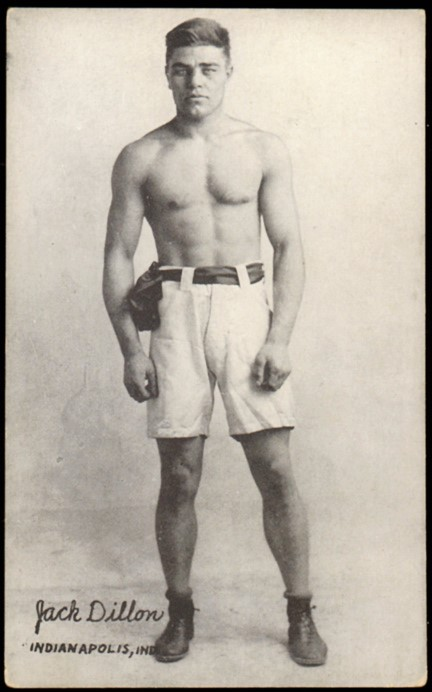

Personal information
- Nicknames: Hoosier Bearcat; Jack the Giant Killer
- Born: Ernest Cutler Price; February 2, 1891 Frankfort, Indiana, US
- Died: August 7, 1942 (aged 51) Chattahoochee, Florida, US
- Height: 5 ft 7.5 in (1.71 m)
- Weight: Light Heavyweight; Middleweight

Boxing career
- Reach: 72 in (180 cm)
- Stance: Orthodox

Boxing record
- Total fights: 254
- Wins: 191
- Win by KO: 65
- Losses: 31
- Draws: 28
- No contests: 4

Ernest Cutler Price (February 2, 1891 – August 7, 1942), better known as Jack Dillon, was an American boxer who held the Light-heavyweight Championship of the World. Dillon was often referred to as "Jack the Giant Killer" for his ability to handle the most dangerous heavyweights of his era. Ring Magazine founder Nat Fleischer ranked Dillon as the #3 Light Heavyweight of all time, while boxing promoter Charley Rose placed him at #2. The International Boxing Research Organization rates Dillon as the 16th best Light-Heavyweight ever. He was inducted into the Ring Magazine Hall of Fame in 1959 and the International Boxing Hall of Fame in 1995. His managers included Sam Murbarger, and later Steve Harter.

== Early life and career ==
Price was born in Frankfort, Indiana, on February 2, 1891, where his father, who died when Price was young, ran a grocery.

Price took the name "Jack Dillon" from the famous racehorse, Sidney Lou Dillon. Price worked at the farm/stable where the horse was housed. At his first fight, Price appeared very nervous. When asked his name, he said Sidney Dillon. The referee misunderstood him, and bawled out "Jack Dillon!".

== Taking the World Light-Heavyweight Championship ==
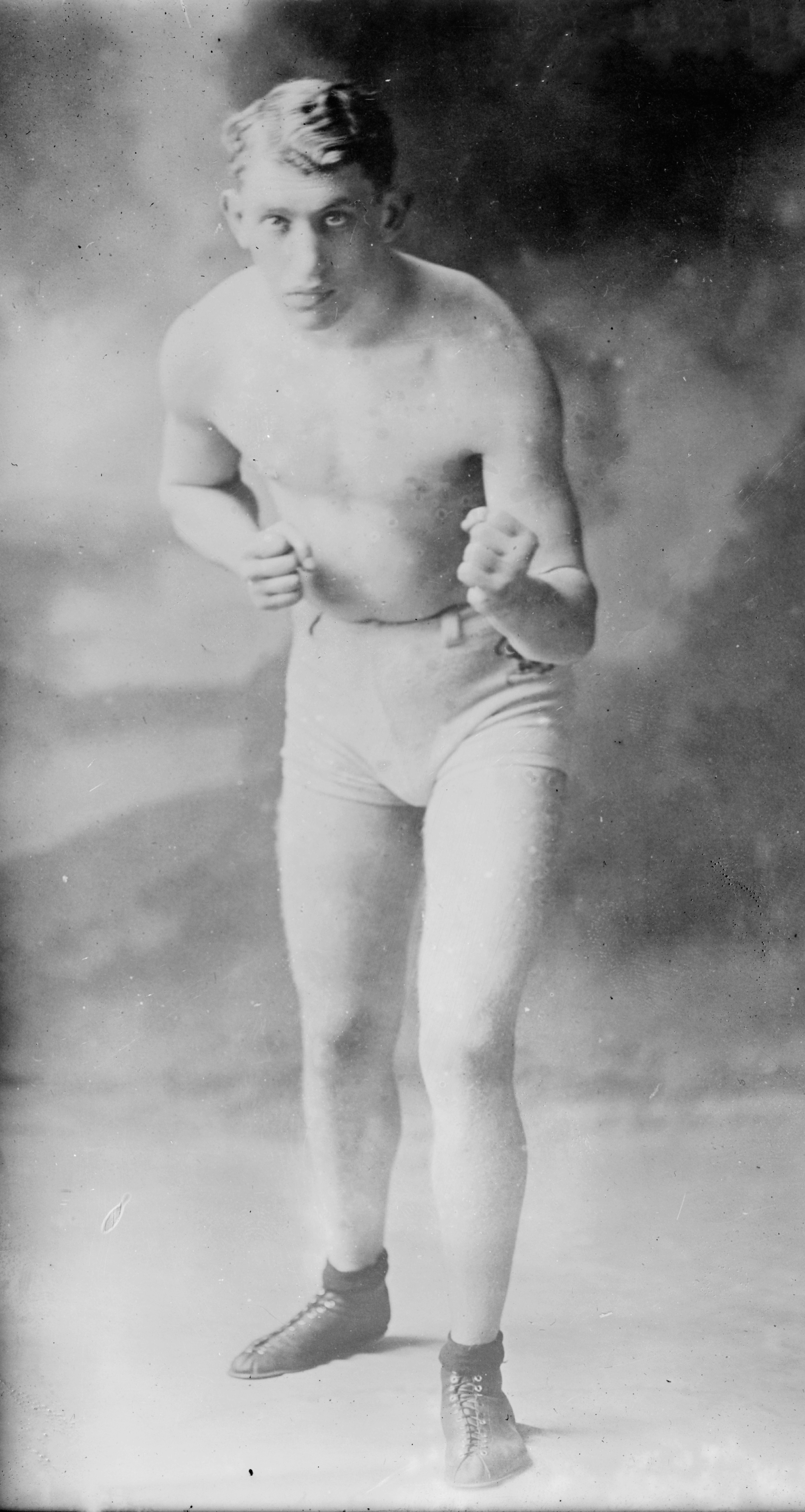
Full-length portrait of Levinsky

Dillon turned pro in 1908 and claimed the vacant World Light Heavyweight title with a win over Battling Levinsky on April 14, 1914, in a twelve-round points decision in Butte, Montana, though at the time his claim to the title was not universally recognized. The Los Angeles Times wrote of their title match that Dillon showed more aggression and tenacity than his opponent and that by the third Levinsky was showing signs of fatigue.

Dillon defeated Levinsky again on May 29, 1914, in a twelve-round points decision in Dillon's hometown of Indianapolis, Indiana. With mixed results, Dillon had met Levinsky twice in his earlier career in October 1911 in Philadelphia, and April 1913 in Rochester.

Dillon would eventually earn official recognition as light-heavyweight champ when he defeated NYSAC champion Bob Moha on June 15, 1914. After twelve rounds, Dillon was declared the winner and the new NYSAC light-heavyweight champion.

=== Top competitors Dillon faced ===
Dillon truly fought the greatest competitors of his era, during the time of the greatest middleweights history had ever known. He rarely if ever shirked a challenge. Between 1910 and 1918, Dillon fought the great middleweight champion George Chip twelve times, often beating him in newspaper decisions. He fought hard punching German-American Middleweight Champion Frank Klaus four times between 1911 and 1913. He fought the great Billy Miske five times from 1916 to 1917 in hotly contested contests before large crowds, though Miske usually won. He lost twice to Mike Gibbons, in the decision of most newspapers, in November 1916, and September 1917. He fought Middleweight champion Al McCoy three times, impressively winning twice in ten round newspaper wins, once in Brooklyn in 1917, and once in Muncie, Indiana in August 1918. On independence Day in 1918, Dillon and McCoy fought a close fight declared a draw in Charleston, South Carolina.

== Losing the World Light Heavyweight Championship to Battling Levinsky ==
On October 24, 1916, Dillon lost the belt in a twelve-round points decision against Levinsky in Boston. Dillon opened strongly but weakened in the final rounds when Levinsky landed blows to his face, jaw, and body.

Still facing tough competition, Dillon faced the great Middleweight Champion Harry Greb twice, once on July 30, 1917, in Pittsburgh, and once on March 14, 1918, in Toledo, Ohio. Though losing in Pittsburgh by a wide margin, he was able to defend himself well against his opponent. Later in Toledo in 1918, Dillon was pummeled more fiercely and seemed to have lost his championship form.

Dillon retired from the ring in 1923.

== Life after boxing ==
Prior to prohibition, he operated a saloon in Indianapolis which eventually failed.

In retirement in Florida, Dillon lived next door to a restaurant that he owned and operated. Dillon died on August 7, 1942, at the State Hospital in Chattahoochee, Florida, where he had spent five months with an illness. He was only 51 at the time of his death.

== Professional boxing record ==
All information in this section is derived from BoxRec, unless otherwise stated.

=== Official record ===
254 fights	95 wins	8 losses
By knockout	65	2
By decision	29	6
By disqualification	1	0
Draws	15	
No contests	4	
Newspaper decisions/draws	132	

All newspaper decisions are officially regarded as "no decision" bouts and are not counted in the win/loss/draw column.

No.	Result	Record	Opponent	Type	Round	Date	Age	Location	Notes
254	Loss	95–8–15 (136)	Johnny Mack	NWS	10	Mar 21, 1923	32 years, 47 days	Greensburg, Indiana, U.S.	
253	Win	95–8–15 (135)	Sailor Joe Walters	NWS	10	Jan 12, 1923	31 years, 344 days	Bicknell, Indiana, U.S.	
252	Loss	95–8–15 (134)	Ed Warner	PTS	10	Feb 18, 1921	30 years, 16 days	Grand Opera House, Helena, Arkansas, U.S.	
251	Win	95–7–15 (134)	Jack Denham	TKO	6 (10)	Feb 15, 1921	30 years, 13 days	Auditorium, Atlanta, Georgia, U.S.	
250	Win	94–7–15 (134)	Billy Edwards	KO	3 (15)	Feb 11, 1921	30 years, 9 days	Auditorium, Alexandria, Louisiana, U.S.	
249	Win	93–7–15 (134)	Eddie Brown	TKO	7 (12)	Jan 25, 1921	29 years, 358 days	Jefferson Theatre, Louisville, Kentucky, U.S.	
248	Loss	92–7–15 (134)	Charley Nashert	PTS	12	Dec 28, 1920	29 years, 310 days	Beethoven Hall, San Antonio, Texas, U.S.	
247	Win	92–6–15 (134)	Jack Moran	TKO	2 (10)	Nov 25, 1920	29 years, 297 days	Victory Athletic Club, Shreveport, Louisiana, U.S.	
246	ND	91–6–15 (134)	Battling Halstead	ND	10	Nov 2, 1920	29 years, 274 days	Fort Smith, Arkansas, U.S.	
245	ND	91–6–15 (133)	Battling Logan	ND	10	Oct 9, 1920	29 years, 250 days	Clarksville, Arkansas, U.S.	
244	Loss	91–6–15 (132)	Battling Halstead	NWS	10	Oct 4, 1920	29 years, 245 days	Frisco A.C., Springfield, Missouri, U.S.	
243	Loss	91–6–15 (131)	Bud Clancy	NWS	10	Sep 4, 1920	29 years, 215 days	Auditorium, Cedar Rapids, Iowa, U.S.	
242	Loss	91–6–15 (130)	Charley Nashert	NWS	10	Jul 26, 1920	29 years, 175 days	Scammon, Kansas, U.S.	
241	Win	91–6–15 (129)	Pat Weiss	PTS	10	Jul 23, 1920	29 years, 172 days	El Reno, Oklahoma, U.S.	
240	Win	90–6–15 (129)	K.O. Sweeney	KO	5 (8)	Jun 3, 1920	29 years, 122 days	Sipe Theatre, Kokomo, Indiana, U.S.	
239	Win	89–6–15 (129)	Jack Riley	KO	8 (?)	May 16, 1920	29 years, 104 days	Gary, Indiana, U.S.	
238	Loss	88–6–15 (129)	Charley Nashert	NWS	10	May 3, 1920	29 years, 91 days	Wichita Falls, Texas, U.S.	
237	Loss	88–6–15 (128)	Paul Roman	NWS	10	Mar 18, 1920	29 years, 45 days	Lake Cliff Casino, Dallas, Texas, U.S.	
236	Loss	88–6–15 (127)	Charley Nashert	PTS	10	Mar 11, 1920	29 years, 38 days	Auditorium, Hot Springs, Arkansas, U.S.	
235	Loss	88–5–15 (127)	Battling Halstead	NWS	8	Feb 20, 1920	29 years, 18 days	Armory, West Palm Beach, Florida, U.S.	
234	Draw	88–5–15 (126)	Battling Halstead	NWS	10	Feb 9, 1920	29 years, 7 days	Fair Building, Miami, Florida, U.S.	
233	Loss	88–5–15 (125)	Phil Harrison	KO	2 (8)	May 24, 1919	28 years, 111 days	New Lyric Theater, Memphis, Tennessee, U.S.	
232	Draw	88–4–15 (125)	Ted Block	NWS	6	Dec 13, 1918	27 years, 314 days	Loyal Moose, Detroit, Michigan, U.S.	
231	Win	88–4–15 (124)	Bob York	NWS	10	Nov 21, 1918	27 years, 292 days	Empire Theatre, Rock Island, Illinois, U.S.	
230	Win	88–4–15 (123)	Harry Krohn	NWS	6	Nov 16, 1918	27 years, 287 days	Camp Sherman, Chillicothe, Ohio, U.S.	
229	Win	88–4–15 (122)	Jack Duffy	NWS	10	Oct 4, 1918	27 years, 244 days	Auditorium, Cedar Rapids, Iowa, U.S.	
228	Win	88–4–15 (121)	Billy Ryan	NWS	10	Sep 25, 1918	27 years, 235 days	Armory Arena, Charleston, West Virginia, U.S.	
227	Win	88–4–15 (120)	Al McCoy	NWS	10	Aug 21, 1918	27 years, 200 days	Muncie A.C., Muncie, Indiana, U.S.	
226	Draw	88–4–15 (119)	Wilmington Jack Daly	PTS	6	Aug 8, 1918	27 years, 187 days	Army Drill Grounds, Valparaiso, Indiana, U.S.	
225	Draw	88–4–14 (119)	Al McCoy	NWS	10	Jul 4, 1918	27 years, 152 days	Charleston, West Virginia, U.S.	
224	Draw	88–4–14 (118)	Frank Hoe	PTS	10	Jul 1, 1918	27 years, 149 days	Fort Benjamin Harrison, Lawrence, Indiana, U.S.	
223	Win	88–4–13 (118)	Hugh Walker	NWS	12	Jun 17, 1918	27 years, 135 days	Mid-Continent Arena, Tulsa, Oklahoma, U.S.	
222	Win	88–4–13 (117)	Sailor Joe Walters	KO	3 (10)	May 29, 1918	27 years, 116 days	Connersville, Indiana, U.S.	
221	Loss	87–4–13 (117)	Frank Farmer	PTS	6	May 7, 1918	27 years, 94 days	Eagles Hall, Tacoma, Washington, U.S.	For Pacific Coast heavyweight title
220	Win	87–3–13 (117)	Hugh Walker	PTS	8	Apr 15, 1918	27 years, 72 days	Phoenix A.C., Memphis, Tennessee, U.S.	
219	Draw	86–3–13 (117)	Bill Scott	PTS	10	Mar 22, 1918	27 years, 48 days	Muncie, Indiana, U.S.	
218	Loss	86–3–12 (117)	Harry Greb	NWS	12	Mar 4, 1918	27 years, 30 days	Coliseum, Toledo, Ohio, U.S.	
217	Draw	86–3–12 (116)	Hugh Walker	PTS	12	Feb 22, 1918	27 years, 20 days	Joplin, Missouri, U.S.	
216	Loss	86–3–11 (116)	George Chip	NWS	10	Jan 25, 1918	26 years, 357 days	Civic Auditorium, Duluth, Minnesota, U.S.	
215	Draw	86–3–11 (115)	Hugh Walker	PTS	10	Nov 29, 1917	26 years, 300 days	Army A.C., North Little Rock, Arkansas, U.S.	
214	Loss	86–3–10 (115)	Billy Miske	NWS	10	Nov 13, 1917	26 years, 284 days	Broadway Arena, Brooklyn, New York City, New York, U.S.	
213	Win	86–3–10 (114)	Soldier Joe Stanley	KO	2 (10)	Nov 3, 1917	26 years, 274 days	Empire Theater, Indianapolis, Indiana, U.S.	
212	Win	85–3–10 (114)	Zulu Kid	PTS	10	Oct 17, 1917	26 years, 257 days	Sohmer Park, Montreal, Quebec, Canada	
211	Loss	84–3–10 (114)	Willie Meehan	NWS	6	Oct 15, 1917	26 years, 255 days	Olympia A.C., Philadelphia, Pennsylvania, U.S.	
210	ND	84–3–10 (113)	Hugh Walker	ND	10	Oct 5, 1917	26 years, 245 days	Fort Riley, Kansas, U.S.	Referee left ring without giving a decision
209	Loss	84–3–10 (112)	Mike Gibbons	NWS	10	Sep 3, 1917	26 years, 213 days	Fair Grounds, Terre Haute, Indiana, U.S.	
208	Loss	84–3–10 (111)	Harry Greb	NWS	10	Jul 30, 1917	26 years, 178 days	Forbes Field, Pittsburgh, Pennsylvania, U.S.	
207	Win	84–3–10 (110)	Jack Clifford	NWS	10	Jul 10, 1917	26 years, 158 days	Broadway S.C., Brooklyn, New York City, New York, U.S.	
206	Win	84–3–10 (109)	Sergeant Ray Smith	KO	1 (10)	Jul 4, 1917	26 years, 152 days	Terre Haute, Indiana, U.S.	
205	Win	83–3–10 (109)	Len Rowlands	PTS	8	Jun 25, 1917	26 years, 143 days	Phoenix A.C., Memphis, Tennessee, U.S.	
204	Win	82–3–10 (109)	George Chip	NWS	10	May 29, 1917	26 years, 116 days	Redland Field, Cincinnati, Ohio, U.S.	
203	Win	82–3–10 (108)	Jack McCarron	NWS	10	May 21, 1917	26 years, 108 days	Coliseum, Toledo, Ohio, U.S.	
202	Draw	82–3–10 (107)	Tom McMahon	PTS	15	May 14, 1917	26 years, 101 days	Dayton, Ohio, U.S.	
201	Win	82–3–9 (107)	Howard Wiggam	TKO	3 (?)	Mar 30, 1917	26 years, 56 days	Auditorium, Hot Springs, Arkansas, U.S.	
200	Win	81–3–9 (107)	Jack Moran	TKO	6 (8)	Mar 19, 1917	26 years, 45 days	Memphis, Tennessee, U.S.	
199	Win	80–3–9 (107)	Al McCoy	NWS	10	Feb 27, 1917	26 years, 25 days	Broadway S.C., Brooklyn, New York City, New York, U.S.	
198	Win	80–3–9 (106)	Gunboat Smith	PTS	20	Feb 16, 1917	26 years, 14 days	Louisiana Auditorium, New Orleans, Louisiana, U.S.	
197	Loss	79–3–9 (106)	Billy Miske	NWS	10	Jan 16, 1917	25 years, 349 days	Broadway Arena, Brooklyn, New York City, New York, U.S.	
196	Win	79–3–9 (105)	Bob Moha	PTS	15	Jan 1, 1917	25 years, 334 days	Miami Club, Dayton, Ohio, U.S.	
195	Loss	78–3–9 (105)	Billy Miske	NWS	10	Dec 19, 1916	25 years, 321 days	Broadway Arena, Brooklyn, New York City, New York, U.S.	
194	Loss	78–3–9 (104)	Mike Gibbons	NWS	10	Nov 10, 1916	25 years, 282 days	Auditorium, Saint Paul, Minnesota, U.S.	
193	Loss	78–3–9 (103)	Battling Levinsky	PTS	12	Oct 24, 1916	25 years, 265 days	Arena, Boston, Massachusetts, U.S.	Lost ABA and NYSAC light-heavyweight titles
192	Win	78–2–9 (103)	Larry Williams	NWS	6	Oct 23, 1916	25 years, 264 days	Olympia A.C., Philadelphia, Pennsylvania, U.S.	
191	Win	78–2–9 (102)	Tim O'Neil	NWS	10	Oct 17, 1916	25 years, 258 days	Broadway Arena, Brooklyn, New York City, New York, U.S.	ABA and NYSAC light-heavyweight titles at stake; (via KO only)
190	Win	78–2–9 (101)	Sailor Grande	KO	2 (10)	Oct 10, 1916	25 years, 251 days	Broadway Arena, Brooklyn, New York City, New York, U.S.	
189	Draw	77–2–9 (101)	Battling Levinsky	NWS	8	Sep 12, 1916	25 years, 223 days	Phoenix A.C., Memphis, Tennessee, U.S.	ABA and NYSAC light-heavyweight titles at stake; (via KO only)
188	Loss	77–2–9 (100)	Battling Levinsky	NWS	10	Jul 13, 1916	25 years, 162 days	Oriole Park, Baltimore, Maryland, U.S.	
187	Win	77–2–9 (99)	Fireman Jim Flynn	KO	4 (15)	Jul 4, 1916	25 years, 153 days	Dewey, Oklahoma, U.S.	
186	Win	76–2–9 (99)	Frank Moran	NWS	10	Jun 29, 1916	25 years, 148 days	Washington Park A.C., Brooklyn, New York City, New York, U.S.	
185	Win	76–2–9 (98)	Bob Devere	NWS	10	May 23, 1916	25 years, 111 days	Broadway Auditorium, Buffalo, New York, U.S.	
184	Win	76–2–9 (97)	Battling Levinsky	PTS	15	Apr 25, 1916	25 years, 83 days	Convention Hall, Kansas City, Missouri, U.S.	Retained ABA and NYSAC light-heavyweight titles
183	Win	75–2–9 (97)	Billy Miske	NWS	10	Apr 14, 1916	25 years, 72 days	Auditorium, Saint Paul, Minnesota, U.S.	
182	Win	75–2–9 (96)	Battling Levinsky	NWS	10	Mar 28, 1916	25 years, 55 days	Broadway Arena, Brooklyn, New York City, New York, U.S.	
181	Win	75–2–9 (95)	Whitey Allen	KO	4 (10)	Mar 18, 1916	25 years, 45 days	Clermont Avenue Rink, Brooklyn, New York City, New York, U.S.	
180	Win	74–2–9 (95)	Gunboat Smith	NWS	10	Mar 14, 1916	25 years, 41 days	Broadway Arena, Brooklyn, New York City, New York, U.S.	
179	Win	74–2–9 (94)	Fireman Jim Flynn	NWS	10	Mar 10, 1916	25 years, 37 days	Manhattan A.C., Manhattan, New York City, New York, U.S.	
178	Win	74–2–9 (93)	Vic Hansen	PTS	8	Feb 14, 1916	25 years, 12 days	Phoenix A.C., Memphis, Tennessee, U.S.	Retained ABA and NYSAC light-heavyweight titles
177	Win	73–2–9 (93)	Battling Levinsky	NWS	10	Feb 8, 1916	25 years, 6 days	Broadway Arena, Brooklyn, New York City, New York, U.S.	
176	Win	73–2–9 (92)	Tom Cowler	KO	2 (10)	Feb 1, 1916	24 years, 364 days	Broadway Arena, Brooklyn, New York City, New York, U.S.	
175	Loss	72–2–9 (92)	Billy Miske	NWS	10	Jan 28, 1916	24 years, 360 days	Opera House, Superior, Wisconsin, U.S.	
174	Win	72–2–9 (91)	Porky Dan Flynn	PTS	8	Jan 10, 1916	24 years, 342 days	Memphis, Tennessee, U.S.	
173	Win	71–2–9 (91)	Al Norton	TKO	4 (8)	Dec 20, 1915	24 years, 321 days	Memphis, Tennessee, U.S.	
172	Win	70–2–9 (91)	Yankee Gilbert	TKO	4 (15)	Dec 17, 1915	24 years, 318 days	Dayton, Ohio, U.S.	
171	Win	69–2–9 (91)	Porky Dan Flynn	NWS	10	Dec 7, 1915	24 years, 308 days	Broadway S.C., Brooklyn, New York City, New York, U.S.	
170	Win	69–2–9 (90)	Fireman Jim Flynn	NWS	10	Nov 30, 1915	24 years, 301 days	Broadway S.C., Brooklyn, New York City, New York, U.S.	
169	Win	69–2–9 (89)	Frank Farmer	KO	4 (10)	Nov 18, 1915	24 years, 289 days	Armory B, Oshkosh, Wisconsin, U.S.	
168	Win	68–2–9 (89)	Charley Weinert	NWS	10	Nov 1, 1915	24 years, 272 days	Madison Square Garden, New York City, New York, U.S.	ABA and NYSAC light-heavyweight titles at stake; (via KO only)
167	Win	68–2–9 (88)	Jim Savage	NWS	10	Oct 5, 1915	24 years, 245 days	Broadway Arena, Brooklyn, New York City, New York, U.S.	
166	Win	68–2–9 (87)	Tom McMahon	NWS	6	Sep 25, 1915	24 years, 235 days	Duquesne Garden, Pittsburgh, Pennsylvania, U.S.	
165	Win	68–2–9 (86)	Sailor Grande	NWS	6	Aug 30, 1915	24 years, 209 days	Olympia A.C., Philadelphia, Pennsylvania, U.S.	
164	Draw	68–2–9 (85)	Tom McCarty	PTS	10	Aug 17, 1915	24 years, 196 days	Judith Theatre, Lewistown, Montana, U.S.	
163	Win	68–2–8 (85)	Zulu Kid	NWS	10	Jul 16, 1915	24 years, 164 days	Brown's Gym A.A., Far Rockaway, Queens, New York City, New York, U.S.	Not to be confused with Young Zulu Kid
162	Win	68–2–8 (84)	Johnny Howard	NWS	10	Jul 12, 1915	24 years, 160 days	Brown's Gym A.A., Far Rockaway, Queens, New York City, New York, U.S.	
161	Draw	68–2–8 (83)	George Chip	PTS	10	Jul 5, 1915	24 years, 153 days	Kansas City, Missouri, U.S.	
160	Win	68–2–7 (83)	Frank Mantell	NWS	10	Jun 11, 1915	24 years, 129 days	Redland Field, Cincinnati, Ohio, U.S.	
159	Loss	68–2–7 (82)	Tom McMahon	NWS	10	Jun 7, 1915	24 years, 125 days	Airdome A.C., Rochester, New York, U.S.	
158	Win	68–2–7 (81)	Jack Lester	PTS	15	May 20, 1915	24 years, 107 days	Joplin, Missouri, U.S.	
157	Win	67–2–7 (81)	Andre Anderson	KO	6 (10)	May 4, 1915	24 years, 91 days	Lexington Opera House, Lexington, Kentucky, U.S.	
156	Win	66–2–7 (81)	Marty Cutler	TKO	6 (10)	Apr 28, 1915	24 years, 85 days	Ben Ali Theater, Lexington, Kentucky, U.S.	
155	Win	65–2–7 (81)	Billy Murray	NWS	10	Apr 6, 1915	24 years, 63 days	Arena, Hudson, Wisconsin, U.S.	
154	Win	65–2–7 (80)	Gunboat Smith	NWS	10	Mar 16, 1915	24 years, 42 days	Auditorium, Milwaukee, Wisconsin, U.S.	
153	Win	65–2–7 (79)	Tom McCarty	NWS	10	Mar 2, 1915	24 years, 28 days	Broadway S.C., Brooklyn, New York City, New York, U.S.	
152	Win	65–2–7 (78)	Johnny Howard	NWS	10	Feb 23, 1915	24 years, 21 days	Broadway Arena, Brooklyn, New York City, New York, U.S.	
151	Win	65–2–7 (77)	Frank Mantell	NWS	10	Feb 20, 1915	24 years, 18 days	Federal A.C., Manhattan, New York City, New York, U.S.	
150	Win	65–2–7 (76)	Larry English	TKO	4 (?)	Jan 25, 1915	23 years, 357 days	Phoenix A.C., Memphis, Tennessee, U.S.	
149	Win	64–2–7 (76)	Battling Halstead	KO	3 (?)	Jan 22, 1915	23 years, 354 days	Christopher, Illinois, U.S.	
148	Win	63–2–7 (76)	Porky Dan Flynn	NWS	10	Jan 16, 1915	23 years, 348 days	Broadway S.C., Brooklyn, New York City, New York, U.S.	
147	Draw	63–2–7 (75)	Young Ahearn	NWS	6	Jan 1, 1915	23 years, 333 days	Olympia A.C., Philadelphia, Pennsylvania, U.S.	
146	Win	63–2–7 (74)	Dick Gilbert	PTS	15	Nov 24, 1914	23 years, 295 days	Colorado A.C., Denver, Colorado, U.S.	
145	Win	62–2–7 (74)	Charley Weinert	TKO	2 (6)	Nov 9, 1914	23 years, 280 days	Olympia A.C., Philadelphia, Pennsylvania, U.S.	Retained NYSAC light-heavyweight title
144	NC	61–2–7 (74)	George K.O. Brown	NC	4 (8)	Oct 14, 1914	23 years, 254 days	Coliseum, Saint Louis, Missouri, U.S.	Stopped for "neither fighter trying"
143	Win	61–2–7 (73)	Fireman Jim Flynn	PTS	10	Oct 5, 1914	23 years, 245 days	Association Park, Kansas City, Missouri, U.S.	
142	Win	60–2–7 (73)	Frank Mantell	NWS	12	Sep 28, 1914	23 years, 238 days	Goodale Arena, Columbus, Ohio, U.S.	NYSAC light-heavyweight title at stake; (via KO only)
141	Draw	60–2–7 (72)	George K.O. Brown	NWS	10	Sep 15, 1914	23 years, 225 days	Knox County Fair Grounds, Vincennes, Indiana, U.S.	
140	Win	60–2–7 (71)	Sailor Einert	NWS	10	Sep 7, 1914	23 years, 217 days	Terre Haute, Indiana, U.S.	
139	Win	60–2–7 (70)	Howard Morrow	NWS	6	Aug 12, 1914	23 years, 191 days	Fuller Theatre, Kalamazoo, Michigan, U.S.	
138	Win	60–2–7 (69)	Joe Mace	TKO	4 (10)	Jul 24, 1914	23 years, 172 days	Muncie, Indiana, U.S.	
137	Win	59–2–7 (69)	George K.O. Brown	NWS	10	Jul 21, 1914	23 years, 169 days	Ball Park, Terre Haute, Indiana, U.S.	
136	Win	59–2–7 (68)	Sailor Ed Petroskey	PTS	10	Jul 3, 1914	23 years, 151 days	Association Park, Kansas City, Missouri, U.S.	
135	Win	58–2–7 (68)	Bob Moha	PTS	12	Jun 15, 1914	23 years, 133 days	Holland Arena, Butte, Montana, U.S.	Retained world light-heavyweight title claim; Won NYSAC light-heavyweight title
134	Win	57–2–7 (68)	Battling Levinsky	NWS	10	May 29, 1914	23 years, 116 days	Federal Park, Indianapolis, Indiana, U.S.	World light-heavyweight title claim at stake; (via KO only)
133	Win	57–2–7 (67)	Al Norton	PTS	10	Apr 28, 1914	23 years, 85 days	Grand Avenue A.C., Kansas City, Missouri, U.S.	
132	Win	56–2–7 (67)	Battling Levinsky	PTS	12	Apr 14, 1914	23 years, 71 days	Holland Arena, Butte, Montana, U.S.	Claimed vacant world light-heavyweight title
131	Win	55–2–7 (67)	George K.O. Brown	PTS	8	Mar 23, 1914	23 years, 49 days	Phoenix A.C., Memphis, Tennessee, U.S.	
130	Win	54–2–7 (67)	Dick Gilbert	NWS	10	Mar 17, 1914	23 years, 43 days	Hot Springs, Arkansas, U.S.	
129	Win	54–2–7 (66)	Jack Lester	TKO	10 (15)	Mar 10, 1914	23 years, 36 days	Colorado A.C., Denver, Colorado, U.S.	
128	Draw	53–2–7 (66)	Fireman Jim Flynn	PTS	10	Mar 3, 1914	23 years, 29 days	Grand Avenue A.C., Kansas City, Missouri, U.S.	
127	Win	53–2–6 (66)	Marshall Claiborne	TKO	3 (?)	Feb 17, 1914	23 years, 15 days	Whittington Park Theater, Hot Springs, Arkansas, U.S.	
126	Win	52–2–6 (66)	Tommy Danforth	TKO	2 (8)	Feb 9, 1914	23 years, 7 days	Phoenix A.C., Memphis, Tennessee, U.S.	
125	Win	51–2–6 (66)	Freddie Hicks	NWS	8	Feb 4, 1914	23 years, 2 days	Windsor A.C., Windsor, Ontario, Canada	
124	Win	51–2–6 (65)	Harry Baker	KO	1 (10)	Jan 30, 1914	22 years, 362 days	Tomlinson Hall, Indianapolis, Indiana, U.S.	
123	Win	50–2–6 (65)	Vic Hansen	PTS	12	Jan 20, 1914	22 years, 352 days	Denver, Colorado, U.S.	
122	Win	49–2–6 (65)	Gus Christie	NWS	10	Jan 1, 1914	22 years, 333 days	South Delaware St. Arena, Indianapolis, Indiana, U.S.	
121	Win	49–2–6 (64)	Sailor Ed Petroskey	PTS	12	Nov 27, 1913	22 years, 298 days	Butte, Montana, U.S.	
120	Win	48–2–6 (64)	Gus Christie	NWS	10	Nov 3, 1913	22 years, 274 days	Queensberry A.C., Milwaukee, Wisconsin, U.S.	
119	Win	48–2–6 (63)	Walter Monaghan	TKO	4 (12)	Oct 14, 1913	22 years, 254 days	Akron, Ohio, U.S.	
118	Loss	47–2–6 (63)	Leo Florian Hauck	NWS	6	Oct 9, 1913	22 years, 249 days	Rocky Springs Park, Lancaster, Pennsylvania, U.S.	
117	Win	47–2–6 (62)	Tony Caponi	KO	8 (12)	Sep 17, 1913	22 years, 227 days	Winnipeg, Manitoba, Canada	
116	Win	46–2–6 (62)	Jack Williams	KO	3 (?)	Aug 11, 1913	22 years, 68 days	Peru, Indiana, U.S.	
115	Win	45–2–6 (62)	George Ashe	NWS	12	Aug 8, 1913	22 years, 187 days	Winnipeg, Manitoba, Canada	
114	Win	45–2–6 (61)	Bill MacKinnon	KO	10 (?)	Jul 3, 1913	22 years, 151 days	Washington Park, Indianapolis, Indiana, U.S.	
113	Win	44–2–6 (61)	Frank Klaus	NWS	10	May 29, 1913	22 years, 116 days	Washington Park, Indianapolis, Indiana, U.S.	
112	Win	44–2–6 (60)	Bob Moha	NWS	10	Apr 28, 1913	22 years, 85 days	Southside A.C., Milwaukee, Wisconsin, U.S.	
111	Draw	44–2–6 (59)	Battling Levinsky	NWS	10	Apr 17, 1913	22 years, 74 days	Rochester, New York, U.S.	
110	Win	44–2–6 (58)	George Chip	NWS	12	Apr 14, 1913	22 years, 71 days	Anderson Auditorium, Youngstown, Ohio, U.S.	
109	Win	44–2–6 (57)	Buck Crouse	NWS	6	Apr 10, 1913	22 years, 67 days	Kenwood Lawn, Pittsburgh, Pennsylvania, U.S.	
108	Win	44–2–6 (56)	Willie KO Brennan	NWS	10	Mar 12, 1913	22 years, 38 days	Auditorium, Indianapolis, Indiana, U.S.	
107	Win	44–2–6 (55)	Al Rogers	NWS	6	Mar 10, 1913	22 years, 36 days	Mishler Theatre, Altoona, Pennsylvania, U.S.	
106	Win	44–2–6 (54)	Jack Denning	KO	2 (10)	Feb 19, 1913	22 years, 17 days	Auditorium, Indianapolis, Indiana, U.S.	
105	Draw	43–2–6 (54)	Bill MacKinnon	PTS	15	Feb 10, 1913	22 years, 8 days	Rhode Island A.C., Thornton, Rhode Island, U.S.	
104	Win	43–2–5 (54)	Frank Logan	NWS	6	Jan 24, 1913	21 years, 357 days	Nonpareil A.C., Philadelphia, Pennsylvania, U.S.	
103	Win	43–2–5 (53)	Leo Florian Hauck	NWS	6	Jan 22, 1913	21 years, 355 days	Olympia A.C., Philadelphia, Pennsylvania, U.S.	
102	Win	43–2–5 (52)	Al Rogers	NWS	6	Jan 18, 1913	21 years, 351 days	Old City Hall, Pittsburgh, Pennsylvania, U.S.	
101	Win	43–2–5 (51)	Frank Mantell	TKO	15 (15)	Jan 9, 1913	21 years, 342 days	Thornton, Rhode Island, U.S.	
100	Win	42–2–5 (51)	Gus Christie	NWS	10	Jan 1, 1913	21 years, 334 days	Auditorium (Virginia Ave.), Indianapolis, Indiana, U.S.	
99	Win	42–2–5 (50)	Harry Ramsey	NWS	10	Dec 19, 1912	21 years, 321 days	Cincinnati, Ohio, U.S.	
98	Win	42–2–5 (49)	Gus Christie	NWS	10	Dec 11, 1912	21 years, 313 days	Auditorium, Indianapolis, Indiana, U.S.	
97	Win	42–2–5 (48)	Grant Clark	TKO	2 (?)	Nov 22, 1912	21 years, 294 days	Empire Theater, Indianapolis, Indiana, U.S.	
96	Win	41–2–5 (48)	George Chip	NWS	10	Nov 11, 1912	21 years, 283 days	Columbus, Ohio, U.S.	
95	Win	41–2–5 (47)	Jimmy Howard	PTS	8	Nov 8, 1912	21 years, 280 days	Memphis, Tennessee, U.S.	
94	Win	40–2–5 (47)	Jack Flynn	KO	4 (10)	Nov 4, 1912	21 years, 276 days	Eagles' Theater, Wabash, Indiana, U.S.	
93	Win	39–2–5 (47)	Battling Conners	KO	7 (?)	Oct 25, 1912	21 years, 266 days	Empire Theater, Indianapolis, Indiana, U.S.	
92	Win	38–2–5 (47)	Gus Christie	PTS	15	Oct 23, 1912	21 years, 264 days	Dayton, Ohio, U.S.	
91	Win	37–2–5 (47)	George Chip	NWS	6	Oct 19, 1912	21 years, 260 days	Old City Hall, Pittsburgh, Pennsylvania, U.S.	
90	Win	37–2–5 (46)	Emmett 'Kid' Wagner	NWS	10	Oct 17, 1912	21 years, 258 days	Johnstown, Pennsylvania, U.S.	
89	Win	37–2–5 (45)	Harry Ramsey	NWS	6	Oct 11, 1912	21 years, 252 days	Nonpareil A.C., Philadelphia, Pennsylvania, U.S.	
88	Win	37–2–5 (44)	Billy Donovan	KO	4 (?)	Aug 12, 1912	21 years, 192 days	Coliseum, Richmond, Indiana, U.S.	
87	Win	36–2–5 (44)	George Chip	NWS	10	Jul 25, 1912	21 years, 174 days	Empire Theater, Indianapolis, Indiana, U.S.	
86	Win	36–2–5 (43)	Joe Gorman	KO	6 (?)	Jul 22, 1912	21 years, 171 days	Southern A.C., Memphis, Tennessee, U.S.	
85	Win	35–2–5 (43)	Joe Thomas	TKO	8 (10)	Jul 4, 1912	21 years, 153 days	Terre Haute, Indiana, U.S.	
84	Win	34–2–5 (43)	George K.O. Brown	NWS	12	Jun 16, 1912	21 years, 135 days	Winnipeg, Manitoba, Canada	
83	Win	34–2–5 (42)	Jack Twin Sullivan	NWS	10	Jun 12, 1912	21 years, 131 days	Convention Hall, Buffalo, New York, U.S.	
82	Win	34–2–5 (41)	Hugo Kelly	KO	3 (10)	May 28, 1912	21 years, 116 days	Empire Theater, Indianapolis, Indiana, U.S.	
81	Loss	33–2–5 (41)	Frank Klaus	NWS	10	May 3, 1912	21 years, 91 days	Madison Square Garden, Manhattan, New York City, New York, U.S.	
80	Loss	33–2–5 (40)	Frank Klaus	PTS	20	Mar 23, 1912	21 years, 50 days	Coffroth's Arena, Daly City, California, U.S.	Lost world middleweight title claim; For Klaus' world middleweight title claim
79	Win	33–1–5 (40)	Walter Coffey	PTS	10	Mar 7, 1912	21 years, 34 days	Wheelmen's Club, Oakland, California, U.S.	
78	Draw	32–1–5 (40)	Grant Clark	NWS	10	Feb 22, 1912	21 years, 20 days	Chamber of Commerce Arena, Columbus, Ohio, U.S.	
77	Win	32–1–5 (39)	George Chip	NWS	6	Feb 10, 1912	21 years, 8 days	Old City Hall, Pittsburgh, Pennsylvania, U.S.	
76	Win	32–1–5 (38)	Paddy Lavin	NWS	10	Feb 8, 1912	21 years, 6 days	Convention Hall, Buffalo, New York, U.S.	
75	Win	32–1–5 (37)	Jimmy Gardner	NWS	6	Feb 3, 1912	21 years, 1 day	National A.C., Philadelphia, Pennsylvania, U.S.	
74	Win	32–1–5 (36)	Billy Berger	NWS	12	Feb 1, 1912	20 years, 364 days	The Auditorium, Youngstown, Ohio, U.S.	
73	Win	32–1–5 (35)	Howard Wiggam	KO	2 (10)	Jan 26, 1912	20 years, 358 days	Tomlinson Hall, Indianapolis, Indiana, U.S.	
72	Win	31–1–5 (35)	Billy Griffith	NWS	6	Jan 20, 1912	20 years, 352 days	Old City Hall, Pittsburgh, Indiana, U.S.	
71	Win	31–1–5 (34)	Leo Florian Hauck	TKO	6 (10)	Jan 1, 1912	20 years, 333 days	Auditorium (Virginia Ave.), Indianapolis, Indiana, U.S.	Won world middleweight title claim
70	Draw	30–1–5 (34)	Frank Klaus	NWS	6	Dec 6, 1911	20 years, 307 days	Old City Hall, Pittsburgh, Pennsylvania, U.S.	
69	Win	30–1–5 (33)	George Chip	NWS	12	Nov 22, 1911	20 years, 293 days	Olympic A.C., Youngstown, Ohio, U.S.	
68	Win	30–1–5 (32)	George K.O. Brown	NWS	6	Nov 11, 1911	20 years, 282 days	Old City Hall, Pittsburgh, Pennsylvania, U.S.	
67	Win	30–1–5 (31)	Eddie McGoorty	NWS	10	Nov 1, 1911	20 years, 272 days	Auditorium (Virginia Ave.), Indianapolis, Indiana, U.S.	
66	Win	30–1–5 (30)	Ralph Erne	NWS	6	Oct 28, 1911	20 years, 268 days	Old City Hall, Pittsburgh, Pennsylvania, U.S.	
65	Win	30–1–5 (29)	Battling Levinsky	NWS	6	Oct 23, 1911	20 years, 263 days	American A.C., Philadelphia, Pennsylvania, U.S.	
64	Win	30–1–5 (28)	Jack Herrick	NWS	10	Oct 20, 1911	20 years, 260 days	South Bend, Indiana, U.S.	
63	Win	30–1–5 (27)	Jack Graham	KO	4 (10)	Oct 4, 1911	20 years, 244 days	Lakewood Park, Vincennes, Indiana, U.S.	
62	Loss	29–1–5 (27)	Eddie McGoorty	TKO	4 (10)	Sep 4, 1911	20 years, 214 days	Orleans A.C., New Orleans, Louisiana, U.S.	
61	Win	29–0–5 (27)	Glenn Coakley	NWS	10	Aug 23, 1911	20 years, 202 days	Lakewood Park, Vincennes, Indiana, U.S.	
60	Draw	29–0–5 (26)	Bob Moha	NWS	10	Jul 3, 1911	20 years, 151 days	International A.C., Buffalo, New York, U.S.	
59	Draw	29–0–5 (25)	Paddy Lavin	NWS	10	Jun 21, 1911	20 years, 139 days	Auditorium (Virginia Ave.), Indianapolis, Indiana, U.S.	
58	Win	29–0–5 (24)	Ralph Erne	NWS	10	Jun 5, 1911	20 years, 123 days	Muncie, Indiana, U.S.	
57	Win	29–0–5 (23)	Jack Herrick	NWS	6	May 20, 1911	20 years, 107 days	Pittsburgh A.A., Pittsburgh, Pennsylvania, U.S.	
56	Win	29–0–5 (22)	Bob Moha	NWS	10	May 3, 1911	20 years, 90 days	Auditorium (Virginia Ave.), Indianapolis, Indiana, U.S.	
55	Win	29–0–5 (21)	George Chip	NWS	10	Apr 28, 1911	20 years, 85 days	Fair Grounds Casino, Terre Haute, Indiana, U.S.	
54	Win	29–0–5 (20)	Jimmy Gardner	NWS	6	Apr 22, 1911	20 years, 79 days	Duquesne Garden, Pittsburgh, Pennsylvania, U.S.	
53	Win	29–0–5 (19)	Jack Stevens	KO	1 (?)	Apr 12, 1911	20 years, 69 days	Mt. Vernon, Indiana, U.S.	
52	Win	28–0–5 (19)	Billy Mayfield	KO	1 (8)	Apr 10, 1911	20 years, 67 days	Crawfordsville, Indiana, U.S.	
51	Win	27–0–5 (19)	Frank Mantell	PTS	12	Apr 4, 1911	20 years, 61 days	Armory A.A., Boston, Massachusetts, U.S.	
50	Win	26–0–5 (19)	Billy Clark	KO	4 (6)	Apr 1, 1911	20 years, 58 days	Old City Hall, Pittsburgh, Pennsylvania, U.S.	
49	Win	25–0–5 (19)	Mike "Twin" Sullivan	NWS	10	Mar 17, 1911	20 years, 43 days	International A.C., Buffalo, New York, U.S.	
48	Win	25–0–5 (18)	Young Loughrey	NWS	10	Mar 15, 1911	20 years, 41 days	Auditorium (Virginia Ave.), Indianapolis, Indiana, U.S.	
47	Win	25–0–5 (17)	Jimmy Mellody	TKO	3 (?)	Mar 14, 1911	20 years, 40 days	Brazil, Indiana, U.S.	
46	Win	24–0–5 (17)	Billy Berger	NWS	6	Mar 4, 1911	20 years, 30 days	Old City Hall, Pittsburgh, Pennsylvania, U.S.	
45	Win	24–0–5 (16)	Jimmy Gardner	NWS	10	Feb 22, 1911	20 years, 20 days	Auditorium (Virginia Ave.), Indianapolis, Indiana, U.S.	
44	Win	24–0–5 (15)	Young Loughrey	NWS	6	Feb 18, 1911	20 years, 16 days	Old City Hall, Pittsburgh, Pennsylvania, U.S.	
43	Draw	24–0–5 (14)	Mike Glover	NWS	6	Feb 4, 1911	20 years, 2 days	Old City Hall, Pittsburgh, Pennsylvania, U.S.	
42	Win	24–0–5 (13)	George Chip	PTS	15	Jan 25, 1911	19 years, 357 days	Gymnastic Club, Dayton, Ohio, U.S.	
41	Draw	23–0–5 (13)	Eddie McGoorty	NWS	12	Jan 11, 1911	19 years, 343 days	Selkirk Hall, Winnipeg, Manitoba, Canada	
40	Win	23–0–5 (12)	Harry Mansfield	NWS	6	Jan 2, 1911	19 years, 334 days	Old City Hall, Pittsburgh, Pennsylvania, U.S.	
39	Loss	23–0–5 (11)	Eddie McGoorty	NWS	10	Dec 16, 1910	19 years, 317 days	Fond du Lac, Wisconsin, U.S.	
38	Win	23–0–5 (10)	George K.O. Brown	PTS	20	Nov 28, 1910	19 years, 299 days	Springfield, Ohio, U.S.	
37	Win	22–0–5 (10)	Jack Herrick	NWS	12	Nov 11, 1910	19 years, 282 days	Auditorium Rink, Winnipeg, Manitoba, Canada	
36	Win	22–0–5 (9)	Billy Berger	NWS	6	Oct 29, 1910	19 years, 269 days	Old City Hall, Pittsburgh, Pennsylvania, U.S.	
35	Win	22–0–5 (8)	George Chip	NWS	6	Oct 21, 1910	19 years, 19 days	Old City Hall, Pittsburgh, Pennsylvania, U.S.	
34	Win	22–0–5 (7)	Jack Herrick	NWS	12	Oct 3, 1910	19 years, 243 days	Auditorium Rink, Winnipeg, Manitoba, Canada	
33	Loss	22–0–5 (6)	Jimmy Perry	NWS	6	Sep 17, 1910	19 years, 227 days	Old City Hall, Pittsburgh, Pennsylvania, U.S.	
32	Win	22–0–5 (5)	Jack Ryan	KO	6 (12)	Jul 28, 1910	19 years, 176 days	Grand Opera House, Anderson, Indiana, U.S.	
31	Win	21–0–5 (5)	Freddie Hicks	NWS	15	Jun 20, 1910	19 years, 138 days	Auditorium, Newark, New Jersey, U.S.	
30	Win	21–0–5 (4)	Howard Morrow	NWS	8	May 30, 1910	19 years, 117 days	Grand Opera House, Anderson, Indiana, U.S.	
29	Win	21–0–5 (3)	Dick Fitzpatrick	NWS	10	Apr 21, 1910	19 years, 78 days	Grand Opera House, Anderson, Indiana, U.S.	
28	Win	21–0–5 (2)	Rube May	TKO	5 (10)	Apr 2, 1910	19 years, 59 days	Grand Opera House, Anderson, Indiana, U.S.	
27	Win	20–0–5 (2)	Ike Garfinkle	NWS	?	Mar 11, 1910	19 years, 37 days	Elks Club, Olean, New York, U.S.	
26	Draw	20–0–5 (1)	Ray Bronson	PTS	8 (10)	Mar 8, 1910	19 years, 34 days	Grand Opera House, Anderson, Indiana, U.S.	The referee declared it a draw in the 8th, although the bout was scheduled for 10 rounds
25	Draw	20–0–4 (1)	Jimmy Cooley	PTS	6	Feb 8, 1910	19 years, 6 days	Mitchell Club, Indianapolis, Indiana, U.S.	
24	Win	20–0–3 (1)	Jap Roberts	KO	2 (10)	Jan 31, 1910	18 years, 363 days	Huber's Garden, Newport, Kentucky, U.S.	
23	Win	19–0–3 (1)	Jimmy Cooley	PTS	6	Dec 22, 1909	18 years, 323 days	Mitchell Club, Indianapolis, Indiana, U.S.	
22	Win	18–0–3 (1)	Kid Sparks	KO	2 (10)	Sep 19, 1909	18 years, 229 days	West Side A.C., McDonoughville, Louisiana, U.S.	
21	Win	17–0–3 (1)	Everett Reeves	KO	6 (8)	Jul 22, 1909	18 years, 170 days	Grand Opera House, Anderson, Indiana, U.S.	
20	Win	16–0–3 (1)	Tommy Scanlon	TKO	6 (10)	Jul 2, 1909	18 years, 150 days	Lakeview Theater, Terre Haute, Indiana, U.S.	
19	Win	15–0–3 (1)	Kid Sullivan	KO	3 (10)	May 28, 1909	18 years, 115 days	Terre Haute, Indiana, U.S.	
18	Win	14–0–3 (1)	Young Connors	PTS	5	May 10, 1909	18 years, 97 days	K of C Auditorium, Indianapolis, Indiana, U.S.	
17	Win	13–0–3 (1)	Kid Gray	TKO	2 (6)	Apr 2, 1909	18 years, 59 days	Mitchell Club, Indianapolis, Indiana, U.S.	
16	Win	12–0–3 (1)	Bobby Long	TKO	5 (6)	Mar 31, 1909	18 years, 57 days	Auditorium, Indianapolis, Indiana, U.S.	
15	Draw	11–0–3 (1)	Ray Bronson	PTS	6	Mar 12, 1909	18 years, 38 days	Hartford City A.C., Hartford City, Indiana, U.S.	
14	Win	11–0–2 (1)	Kid Griffin	KO	4 (?)	Mar 5, 1909	18 years, 31 days	Indianapolis, Indiana, U.S.	
13	Win	10–0–2 (1)	Pat Lark	NWS	6	Mar 3, 1909	18 years, 29 days	Auditorium, Indianapolis, Indiana, U.S.	
12	Win	10–0–2	Grant Clark	KO	6 (?)	Feb 24, 1909	18 years, 22 days	Columbus, Ohio, U.S.	
11	Win	9–0–2	Charles Humphries	KO	2 (10)	Feb 20, 1909	18 years, 18 days	Marion Club, Indianapolis, Indiana, U.S.	
10	Win	8–0–2	Kid Simms	KO	3 (4)	Feb 3, 1909	18 years, 1 day	Auditorium, Indianapolis, Indiana, U.S.	
9	Win	7–0–2	Joe McAree	DQ	4 (6)	Jan 22, 1909	17 years, 355 days	Auditorium, Indianapolis, Indiana, U.S.	
8	Win	6–0–2	Tommy Clark	PTS	10	Dec 19, 1908	17 years, 321 days	Marion Club, Indianapolis, Indiana, U.S.	
7	Draw	5–0–2	Ted Malone	PTS	10	Nov 20, 1908	17 years, 292 days	Gymnastic Club, Dayton, Ohio, U.S.	
6	Win	5–0–1	Pat Lark	KO	4 (?)	Nov 13, 1908	17 years, 285 days	Indianapolis, Indiana, U.S.	
5	Win	4–0–1	Tom DeLane	KO	4 (?)	Oct 27, 1908	17 years, 268 days	Columbus, Ohio, U.S.	
4	Win	3–0–1	Lem Potter	KO	4 (?)	Oct 5, 1908	17 years, 246 days	Indianapolis, Indiana, U.S.	
3	Win	2–0–1	Jack Laffey	KO	4 (6)	Sep 19, 1908	17 years, 230 days	Marion Club, Indianapolis, Indiana, U.S.	
2	Win	1–0–1	Joe McAree	PTS	6	Jul 20, 1908	17 years, 169 days	Indianapolis, Indiana, U.S.	
1	Draw	0–0–1	Fortville Kid Brown	PTS	6	Apr 18, 1908	17 years, 76 days	Marion Club, Indianapolis, Indiana, U.S.	

=== Unofficial record ===
254 fights	191 wins	31 losses
By knockout	65	2
By decision	125	29
By disqualification	1	0
Draws	28	
No contests	4	

Record with the inclusion of newspaper decisions in the win/loss/draw column.

No.	Result	Record	Opponent	Type	Round	Date	Age	Location	Notes
254	Loss	191–31–28 (3)	Johnny Mack	NWS	10	Mar 21, 1923	32 years, 47 days	Greensburg, Indiana, U.S.	
253	Win	191–30–28 (3)	Sailor Joe Walters	NWS	10	Jan 12, 1923	31 years, 344 days	Bicknell, Indiana, U.S.	
252	Loss	190–30–28 (3)	Ed Warner	PTS	10	Feb 18, 1921	30 years, 16 days	Grand Opera House, Helena, Arkansas, U.S.	
251	Win	190–29–28 (3)	Jack Denham	TKO	6 (10)	Feb 15, 1921	30 years, 13 days	Auditorium, Atlanta, Georgia, U.S.	
250	Win	189–29–28 (3)	Billy Edwards	KO	3 (15)	Feb 11, 1921	30 years, 9 days	Auditorium, Alexandria, Louisiana, U.S.	
249	Win	188–29–28 (3)	Eddie Brown	TKO	7 (12)	Jan 25, 1921	29 years, 358 days	Jefferson Theatre, Louisville, Kentucky, U.S.	
248	Loss	187–29–28 (3)	Charley Nashert	PTS	12	Dec 28, 1920	29 years, 310 days	Beethoven Hall, San Antonio, Texas, U.S.	
247	Win	187–28–28 (3)	Jack Moran	TKO	2 (10)	Nov 25, 1920	29 years, 297 days	Victory Athletic Club, Shreveport, Louisiana, U.S.	
246	ND	186–28–28 (3)	Battling Halstead	ND	10	Nov 2, 1920	29 years, 274 days	Fort Smith, Arkansas, U.S.	
245	ND	186–28–28 (3)	Battling Logan	ND	10	Oct 9, 1920	29 years, 250 days	Clarksville, Arkansas, U.S.	
244	Loss	186–28–28 (2)	Battling Halstead	NWS	10	Oct 4, 1920	29 years, 245 days	Frisco A.C., Springfield, Missouri, U.S.	
243	Loss	186–27–28 (2)	Bud Clancy	NWS	10	Sep 4, 1920	29 years, 215 days	Auditorium, Cedar Rapids, Iowa, U.S.	
242	Loss	186–26–28 (2)	Charley Nashert	NWS	10	Jul 26, 1920	29 years, 175 days	Scammon, Kansas, U.S.	
241	Win	186–25–28 (2)	Pat Weiss	PTS	10	Jul 23, 1920	29 years, 172 days	El Reno, Oklahoma, U.S.	
240	Win	185–25–28 (2)	K.O. Sweeney	KO	5 (8)	Jun 3, 1920	29 years, 122 days	Sipe Theatre, Kokomo, Indiana, U.S.	
239	Win	184–25–28 (2)	Jack Riley	KO	8 (?)	May 16, 1920	29 years, 104 days	Gary, Indiana, U.S.	
238	Loss	183–25–28 (2)	Charley Nashert	NWS	10	May 3, 1920	29 years, 91 days	Wichita Falls, Texas, U.S.	
237	Loss	183–24–28 (2)	Paul Roman	NWS	10	Mar 18, 1920	29 years, 45 days	Lake Cliff Casino, Dallas, Texas, U.S.	
236	Loss	183–23–28 (2)	Charley Nashert	PTS	10	Mar 11, 1920	29 years, 38 days	Auditorium, Hot Springs, Arkansas, U.S.	
235	Loss	183–22–28 (2)	Battling Halstead	NWS	8	Feb 20, 1920	29 years, 18 days	Armory, West Palm Beach, Florida, U.S.	
234	Draw	183–21–28 (2)	Battling Halstead	NWS	10	Feb 9, 1920	29 years, 7 days	Fair Building, Miami, Florida, U.S.	
233	Loss	183–21–27 (2)	Phil Harrison	KO	2 (8)	May 24, 1919	28 years, 111 days	New Lyric Theater, Memphis, Tennessee, U.S.	
232	Draw	183–20–27 (2)	Ted Block	NWS	6	Dec 13, 1918	27 years, 314 days	Loyal Moose, Detroit, Michigan, U.S.	
231	Win	183–20–26 (2)	Bob York	NWS	10	Nov 21, 1918	27 years, 292 days	Empire Theatre, Rock Island, Illinois, U.S.	
230	Win	182–20–26 (2)	Harry Krohn	NWS	6	Nov 16, 1918	27 years, 287 days	Camp Sherman, Chillicothe, Ohio, U.S.	
229	Win	181–20–26 (2)	Jack Duffy	NWS	10	Oct 4, 1918	27 years, 244 days	Auditorium, Cedar Rapids, Iowa, U.S.	
228	Win	180–20–26 (2)	Billy Ryan	NWS	10	Sep 25, 1918	27 years, 235 days	Armory Arena, Charleston, West Virginia, U.S.	
227	Win	179–20–26 (2)	Al McCoy	NWS	10	Aug 21, 1918	27 years, 200 days	Muncie A.C., Muncie, Indiana, U.S.	
226	Draw	178–20–26 (2)	Wilmington Jack Daly	PTS	6	Aug 8, 1918	27 years, 187 days	Army Drill Grounds, Valparaiso, Indiana, U.S.	
225	Draw	178–20–25 (2)	Al McCoy	NWS	10	Jul 4, 1918	27 years, 152 days	Charleston, West Virginia, U.S.	
224	Draw	178–20–24 (2)	Frank Hoe	PTS	10	Jul 1, 1918	27 years, 149 days	Fort Benjamin Harrison, Lawrence, Indiana, U.S.	
223	Win	178–20–23 (2)	Hugh Walker	NWS	12	Jun 17, 1918	27 years, 135 days	Mid-Continent Arena, Tulsa, Oklahoma, U.S.	
222	Win	177–20–23 (2)	Sailor Joe Walters	KO	3 (10)	May 29, 1918	27 years, 116 days	Connersville, Indiana, U.S.	
221	Loss	176–20–23 (2)	Frank Farmer	PTS	6	May 7, 1918	27 years, 94 days	Eagles Hall, Tacoma, Washington, U.S.	For Pacific Coast heavyweight title
220	Win	176–19–23 (2)	Hugh Walker	PTS	8	Apr 15, 1918	27 years, 72 days	Phoenix A.C., Memphis, Tennessee, U.S.	
219	Draw	175–19–23 (2)	Bill Scott	PTS	10	Mar 22, 1918	27 years, 48 days	Muncie, Indiana, U.S.	
218	Loss	175–19–22 (2)	Harry Greb	NWS	12	Mar 4, 1918	27 years, 30 days	Coliseum, Toledo, Ohio, U.S.	
217	Draw	175–18–22 (2)	Hugh Walker	PTS	12	Feb 22, 1918	27 years, 20 days	Joplin, Missouri, U.S.	
216	Loss	175–18–21 (2)	George Chip	NWS	10	Jan 25, 1918	26 years, 357 days	Civic Auditorium, Duluth, Minnesota, U.S.	
215	Draw	175–17–21 (2)	Hugh Walker	PTS	10	Nov 29, 1917	26 years, 300 days	Army A.C., North Little Rock, Arkansas, U.S.	
214	Loss	175–17–20 (2)	Billy Miske	NWS	10	Nov 13, 1917	26 years, 284 days	Broadway Arena, New York City, New York, U.S.	
213	Win	175–16–20 (2)	Soldier Joe Stanley	KO	2 (10)	Nov 3, 1917	26 years, 274 days	Empire Theater, Indianapolis, Indiana, U.S.	
212	Win	174–16–20 (2)	Zulu Kid	PTS	10	Oct 17, 1917	26 years, 257 days	Sohmer Park, Montreal, Quebec, Canada	
211	Loss	173–16–20 (2)	Willie Meehan	NWS	6	Oct 15, 1917	26 years, 255 days	Olympia A.C., Philadelphia, Pennsylvania, U.S.	
210	ND	173–15–20 (2)	Hugh Walker	ND	10	Oct 5, 1917	26 years, 245 days	Fort Riley, Kansas, U.S.	Referee left ring without giving a decision
209	Loss	173–15–20 (1)	Mike Gibbons	NWS	10	Sep 3, 1917	26 years, 213 days	Fair Grounds, Terre Haute, Indiana, U.S.	
208	Loss	173–14–20 (1)	Harry Greb	NWS	10	Jul 30, 1917	26 years, 178 days	Forbes Field, Pittsburgh, Pennsylvania, U.S.	
207	Win	173–13–20 (1)	Jack Clifford	NWS	10	Jul 10, 1917	26 years, 158 days	Broadway S.C., New York City, New York, U.S.	
206	Win	172–13–20 (1)	Sergeant Ray Smith	KO	1 (10)	Jul 4, 1917	26 years, 152 days	Terre Haute, Indiana, U.S.	
205	Win	171–13–20 (1)	Len Rowlands	PTS	8	Jun 25, 1917	26 years, 143 days	Phoenix A.C., Memphis, Tennessee, U.S.	
204	Win	170–13–20 (1)	George Chip	NWS	10	May 29, 1917	26 years, 116 days	Redland Field, Cincinnati, Ohio, U.S.	
203	Win	169–13–20 (1)	Jack McCarron	NWS	10	May 21, 1917	26 years, 108 days	Coliseum, Toledo, Ohio, U.S.	
202	Draw	168–13–20 (1)	Tom McMahon	PTS	15	May 14, 1917	26 years, 101 days	Dayton, Ohio, U.S.	
201	Win	168–13–19 (1)	Howard Wiggam	TKO	3 (?)	Mar 30, 1917	26 years, 56 days	Auditorium, Hot Springs, Arkansas, U.S.	
200	Win	167–13–19 (1)	Jack Moran	TKO	6 (8)	Mar 19, 1917	26 years, 45 days	Memphis, Tennessee, U.S.	
199	Win	166–13–19 (1)	Al McCoy	NWS	10	Feb 27, 1917	26 years, 25 days	Broadway S.C., New York City, New York, U.S.	
198	Win	165–13–19 (1)	Gunboat Smith	PTS	20	Feb 16, 1917	26 years, 14 days	Louisiana Auditorium, New Orleans, Louisiana, U.S.	
197	Loss	164–13–19 (1)	Billy Miske	NWS	10	Jan 16, 1917	25 years, 349 days	Broadway Arena, New York City, New York, U.S.	
196	Win	164–12–19 (1)	Bob Moha	PTS	15	Jan 1, 1917	25 years, 334 days	Miami Club, Dayton, Ohio, U.S.	
195	Loss	163–12–19 (1)	Billy Miske	NWS	10	Dec 19, 1916	25 years, 321 days	Broadway Arena, New York City, New York, U.S.	
194	Loss	163–11–19 (1)	Mike Gibbons	NWS	10	Nov 10, 1916	25 years, 282 days	Auditorium, Saint Paul, Minnesota, U.S.	
193	Loss	163–10–19 (1)	Battling Levinsky	PTS	12	Oct 24, 1916	25 years, 265 days	Arena, Boston, Massachusetts, U.S.	Lost ABA and NYSAC light-heavyweight titles
192	Win	163–9–19 (1)	Larry Williams	NWS	6	Oct 23, 1916	25 years, 264 days	Olympia A.C., Philadelphia, Pennsylvania, U.S.	
191	Win	162–9–19 (1)	Tim O'Neil	NWS	10	Oct 17, 1916	25 years, 258 days	Broadway Arena, New York City, New York, U.S.	ABA and NYSAC light-heavyweight titles at stake; (via KO only)
190	Win	161–9–19 (1)	Sailor Grande	KO	2 (10)	Oct 10, 1916	25 years, 251 days	Broadway Arena, New York City, New York, U.S.	
189	Draw	160–9–19 (1)	Battling Levinsky	NWS	8	Sep 12, 1916	25 years, 223 days	Phoenix A.C., Memphis, Tennessee, U.S.	ABA and NYSAC light-heavyweight titles at stake; (via KO only)
188	Loss	160–9–18 (1)	Battling Levinsky	NWS	10	Jul 13, 1916	25 years, 162 days	Oriole Park, Baltimore, Maryland, U.S.	
187	Win	160–8–18 (1)	Fireman Jim Flynn	KO	4 (15)	Jul 4, 1916	25 years, 153 days	Dewey, Oklahoma, U.S.	
186	Win	159–8–18 (1)	Frank Moran	NWS	10	Jun 29, 1916	25 years, 148 days	Washington Park A.C., New York City, New York, U.S.	
185	Win	158–8–18 (1)	Bob Devere	NWS	10	May 23, 1916	25 years, 111 days	Broadway Auditorium, Buffalo, New York, U.S.	
184	Win	157–8–18 (1)	Battling Levinsky	PTS	15	Apr 25, 1916	25 years, 83 days	Convention Hall, Kansas City, Missouri, U.S.	Retained ABA and NYSAC light-heavyweight titles
183	Win	156–8–18 (1)	Billy Miske	NWS	10	Apr 14, 1916	25 years, 72 days	Auditorium, Saint Paul, Minnesota, U.S.	
182	Win	155–8–18 (1)	Battling Levinsky	NWS	10	Mar 28, 1916	25 years, 55 days	Broadway Arena, New York City, New York, U.S.	
181	Win	154–8–18 (1)	Whitey Allen	KO	4 (10)	Mar 18, 1916	25 years, 45 days	Clermont Avenue Rink, New York City, New York, U.S.	
180	Win	153–8–18 (1)	Gunboat Smith	NWS	10	Mar 14, 1916	25 years, 41 days	Broadway Arena, New York City, New York, U.S.	
179	Win	152–8–18 (1)	Fireman Jim Flynn	NWS	10	Mar 10, 1916	25 years, 37 days	Manhattan A.C., New York City, New York, U.S.	
178	Win	151–8–18 (1)	Vic Hansen	PTS	8	Feb 14, 1916	25 years, 12 days	Phoenix A.C., Memphis, Tennessee, U.S.	Retained ABA and NYSAC light-heavyweight titles
177	Win	150–8–18 (1)	Battling Levinsky	NWS	10	Feb 8, 1916	25 years, 6 days	Broadway Arena, New York City, New York, U.S.	
176	Win	149–8–18 (1)	Tom Cowler	KO	2 (10)	Feb 1, 1916	24 years, 364 days	Broadway Arena, New York City, New York, U.S.	
175	Loss	148–8–18 (1)	Billy Miske	NWS	10	Jan 28, 1916	24 years, 360 days	Opera House, Superior, Wisconsin, U.S.	
174	Win	148–7–18 (1)	Porky Dan Flynn	PTS	8	Jan 10, 1916	24 years, 342 days	Memphis, Tennessee, U.S.	
173	Win	147–7–18 (1)	Al Norton	TKO	4 (8)	Dec 20, 1915	24 years, 321 days	Memphis, Tennessee, U.S.	
172	Win	146–7–18 (1)	Yankee Gilbert	TKO	4 (15)	Dec 17, 1915	24 years, 318 days	Dayton, Ohio, U.S.	
171	Win	145–7–18 (1)	Porky Dan Flynn	NWS	10	Dec 7, 1915	24 years, 308 days	Broadway S.C., New York City, New York, U.S.	
170	Win	144–7–18 (1)	Fireman Jim Flynn	NWS	10	Nov 30, 1915	24 years, 301 days	Broadway S.C., New York City, New York, U.S.	
169	Win	143–7–18 (1)	Frank Farmer	KO	4 (10)	Nov 18, 1915	24 years, 289 days	Armory B, Oshkosh, Wisconsin, U.S.	
168	Win	142–7–18 (1)	Charley Weinert	NWS	10	Nov 1, 1915	24 years, 272 days	Madison Square Garden, New York City, New York, U.S.	ABA and NYSAC light-heavyweight titles at stake; (via KO only)
167	Win	141–7–18 (1)	Jim Savage	NWS	10	Oct 5, 1915	24 years, 245 days	Broadway Arena, New York City, New York, U.S.	
166	Win	140–7–18 (1)	Tom McMahon	NWS	6	Sep 25, 1915	24 years, 235 days	Duquesne Garden, Pittsburgh, Pennsylvania, U.S.	
165	Win	139–7–18 (1)	Sailor Grande	NWS	6	Aug 30, 1915	24 years, 209 days	Olympia A.C., Philadelphia, Pennsylvania, U.S.	
164	Draw	138–7–18 (1)	Tom McCarty	PTS	10	Aug 17, 1915	24 years, 196 days	Judith Theatre, Lewistown, Montana, U.S.	
163	Win	138–7–17 (1)	Zulu Kid	NWS	10	Jul 16, 1915	24 years, 164 days	Brown's Gym A.A., Far Rockaway, New York City, New York, U.S.	Not to be confused with Young Zulu Kid
162	Win	137–7–17 (1)	Johnny Howard	NWS	10	Jul 12, 1915	24 years, 160 days	Brown's Gym A.A., Far Rockaway, New York City, New York, U.S.	
161	Draw	136–7–17 (1)	George Chip	PTS	10	Jul 5, 1915	24 years, 153 days	Kansas City, Missouri, U.S.	
160	Win	136–7–16 (1)	Frank Mantell	NWS	10	Jun 11, 1915	24 years, 129 days	Redland Field, Cincinnati, Ohio, U.S.	
159	Loss	135–7–16 (1)	Tom McMahon	NWS	10	Jun 7, 1915	24 years, 125 days	Airdome A.C., Rochester, New York, U.S.	
158	Win	135–6–16 (1)	Jack Lester	PTS	15	May 20, 1915	24 years, 107 days	Joplin, Missouri, U.S.	
157	Win	134–6–16 (1)	Andre Anderson	KO	6 (10)	May 4, 1915	24 years, 91 days	Lexington Opera House, Lexington, Kentucky, U.S.	
156	Win	133–6–16 (1)	Marty Cutler	TKO	6 (10)	Apr 28, 1915	24 years, 85 days	Ben Ali Theater, Lexington, Kentucky, U.S.	
155	Win	132–6–16 (1)	Billy Murray	NWS	10	Apr 6, 1915	24 years, 63 days	Arena, Hudson, Wisconsin, U.S.	
154	Win	131–6–16 (1)	Gunboat Smith	NWS	10	Mar 16, 1915	24 years, 42 days	Auditorium, Milwaukee, Wisconsin, U.S.	
153	Win	130–6–16 (1)	Tom McCarty	NWS	10	Mar 2, 1915	24 years, 28 days	Broadway S.C., New York City, New York, U.S.	
152	Win	129–6–16 (1)	Johnny Howard	NWS	10	Feb 23, 1915	24 years, 21 days	Broadway Arena, New York City, New York, U.S.	
151	Win	128–6–16 (1)	Frank Mantell	NWS	10	Feb 20, 1915	24 years, 18 days	Federal A.C., New York City, New York, U.S.	
150	Win	127–6–16 (1)	Larry English	TKO	4 (?)	Jan 25, 1915	23 years, 357 days	Phoenix A.C., Memphis, Tennessee, U.S.	
149	Win	126–6–16 (1)	Battling Halstead	KO	3 (?)	Jan 22, 1915	23 years, 354 days	Christopher, Illinois, U.S.	
148	Win	125–6–16 (1)	Porky Dan Flynn	NWS	10	Jan 16, 1915	23 years, 348 days	Broadway S.C., New York City, New York, U.S.	
147	Draw	124–6–16 (1)	Young Ahearn	NWS	6	Jan 1, 1915	23 years, 333 days	Olympia A.C., Philadelphia, Pennsylvania, U.S.	
146	Win	124–6–15 (1)	Dick Gilbert	PTS	15	Nov 24, 1914	23 years, 295 days	Colorado A.C., Denver, Colorado, U.S.	
145	Win	123–6–15 (1)	Charley Weinert	TKO	2 (6)	Nov 9, 1914	23 years, 280 days	Olympia A.C., Philadelphia, Pennsylvania, U.S.	Retained NYSAC light-heavyweight title
144	NC	122–6–15 (1)	George K.O. Brown	NC	4 (8)	Oct 14, 1914	23 years, 254 days	Coliseum, Saint Louis, Missouri, U.S.	Stopped for "neither fighter trying"
143	Win	122–6–15	Fireman Jim Flynn	PTS	10	Oct 5, 1914	23 years, 245 days	Association Park, Kansas City, Missouri, U.S.	
142	Win	121–6–15	Frank Mantell	NWS	12	Sep 28, 1914	23 years, 238 days	Goodale Arena, Columbus, Ohio, U.S.	NYSAC light-heavyweight title at stake; (via KO only)
141	Draw	120–6–15	George K.O. Brown	NWS	10	Sep 15, 1914	23 years, 225 days	Knox County Fair Grounds, Vincennes, Indiana, U.S.	
140	Win	120–6–14	Sailor Einert	NWS	10	Sep 7, 1914	23 years, 217 days	Terre Haute, Indiana, U.S.	
139	Win	119–6–14	Howard Morrow	NWS	6	Aug 12, 1914	23 years, 191 days	Fuller Theatre, Kalamazoo, Michigan, U.S.	
138	Win	118–6–14	Joe Mace	TKO	4 (10)	Jul 24, 1914	23 years, 172 days	Muncie, Indiana, U.S.	
137	Win	117–6–14	George K.O. Brown	NWS	10	Jul 21, 1914	23 years, 169 days	Ball Park, Terre Haute, Indiana, U.S.	
136	Win	116–6–14	Sailor Ed Petroskey	PTS	10	Jul 3, 1914	23 years, 151 days	Association Park, Kansas City, Missouri, U.S.	
135	Win	115–6–14	Bob Moha	PTS	12	Jun 15, 1914	23 years, 133 days	Holland Arena, Butte, Montana, U.S.	Retained world light-heavyweight title claim; Won NYSAC light-heavyweight title
134	Win	114–6–14	Battling Levinsky	NWS	10	May 29, 1914	23 years, 116 days	Federal Park, Indianapolis, Indiana, U.S.	World light-heavyweight title claim at stake; (via KO only)
133	Win	113–6–14	Al Norton	PTS	10	Apr 28, 1914	23 years, 85 days	Grand Avenue A.C., Kansas City, Missouri, U.S.	
132	Win	112–6–14	Battling Levinsky	PTS	12	Apr 14, 1914	23 years, 71 days	Holland Arena, Butte, Montana, U.S.	Claimed vacant world light-heavyweight title
131	Win	111–6–14	George K.O. Brown	PTS	8	Mar 23, 1914	23 years, 49 days	Phoenix A.C., Memphis, Tennessee, U.S.	
130	Win	110–6–14	Dick Gilbert	NWS	10	Mar 17, 1914	23 years, 43 days	Hot Springs, Arkansas, U.S.	
129	Win	109–6–14	Jack Lester	TKO	10 (15)	Mar 10, 1914	23 years, 36 days	Colorado A.C., Denver, Colorado, U.S.	
128	Draw	108–6–14	Fireman Jim Flynn	PTS	10	Mar 3, 1914	23 years, 29 days	Grand Avenue A.C., Kansas City, Missouri, U.S.	
127	Win	108–6–13	Marshall Claiborne	TKO	3 (?)	Feb 17, 1914	23 years, 15 days	Whittington Park Theater, Hot Springs, Arkansas, U.S.	
126	Win	107–6–13	Tommy Danforth	TKO	2 (8)	Feb 9, 1914	23 years, 7 days	Phoenix A.C., Memphis, Tennessee, U.S.	
125	Win	106–6–13	Freddie Hicks	NWS	8	Feb 4, 1914	23 years, 2 days	Windsor A.C., Windsor, Ontario, Canada	
124	Win	105–6–13	Harry Baker	KO	1 (10)	Jan 30, 1914	22 years, 362 days	Tomlinson Hall, Indianapolis, Indiana, U.S.	
123	Win	104–6–13	Vic Hansen	PTS	12	Jan 20, 1914	22 years, 352 days	Denver, Colorado, U.S.	
122	Win	103–6–13	Gus Christie	NWS	10	Jan 1, 1914	22 years, 333 days	South Delaware St. Arena, Indianapolis, Indiana, U.S.	
121	Win	102–6–13	Sailor Ed Petroskey	PTS	12	Nov 27, 1913	22 years, 298 days	Butte, Montana, U.S.	
120	Win	101–6–13	Gus Christie	NWS	10	Nov 3, 1913	22 years, 274 days	Queensberry A.C., Milwaukee, Wisconsin, U.S.	
119	Win	100–6–13	Walter Monaghan	TKO	4 (12)	Oct 14, 1913	22 years, 254 days	Akron, Ohio, U.S.	
118	Loss	99–6–13	Leo Florian Hauck	NWS	6	Oct 9, 1913	22 years, 249 days	Rocky Springs Park, Lancaster, Pennsylvania, U.S.	
117	Win	99–5–13	Tony Caponi	KO	8 (12)	Sep 17, 1913	22 years, 227 days	Winnipeg, Manitoba, Canada	
116	Win	98–5–13	Jack Williams	KO	3 (?)	Aug 11, 1913	22 years, 68 days	Peru, Indiana, U.S.	
115	Win	97–5–13	George Ashe	NWS	12	Aug 8, 1913	22 years, 187 days	Winnipeg, Manitoba, Canada	
114	Win	96–5–13	Bill MacKinnon	KO	10 (?)	Jul 3, 1913	22 years, 151 days	Washington Park, Indianapolis, Indiana, U.S.	
113	Win	95–5–13	Frank Klaus	NWS	10	May 29, 1913	22 years, 116 days	Washington Park, Indianapolis, Indiana, U.S.	
112	Win	94–5–13	Bob Moha	NWS	10	Apr 28, 1913	22 years, 85 days	Southside A.C., Milwaukee, Wisconsin, U.S.	
111	Draw	93–5–13	Battling Levinsky	NWS	10	Apr 17, 1913	22 years, 74 days	Rochester, New York, U.S.	
110	Win	93–5–12	George Chip	NWS	12	Apr 14, 1913	22 years, 71 days	Anderson Auditorium, Youngstown, Ohio, U.S.	
109	Win	92–5–12	Buck Crouse	NWS	6	Apr 10, 1913	22 years, 67 days	Kenwood Lawn, Pittsburgh, Pennsylvania, U.S.	
108	Win	91–5–12	Willie KO Brennan	NWS	10	Mar 12, 1913	22 years, 38 days	Auditorium, Indianapolis, Indiana, U.S.	
107	Win	90–5–12	Al Rogers	NWS	6	Mar 10, 1913	22 years, 36 days	Mishler Theatre, Altoona, Pennsylvania, U.S.	
106	Win	89–5–12	Jack Denning	KO	2 (10)	Feb 19, 1913	22 years, 17 days	Auditorium, Indianapolis, Indiana, U.S.	
105	Draw	88–5–12	Bill MacKinnon	PTS	15	Feb 10, 1913	22 years, 8 days	Rhode Island A.C., Thornton, Rhode Island, U.S.	
104	Win	88–5–11	Frank Logan	NWS	6	Jan 24, 1913	21 years, 357 days	Nonpareil A.C., Philadelphia, Pennsylvania, U.S.	
103	Win	87–5–11	Leo Florian Hauck	NWS	6	Jan 22, 1913	21 years, 355 days	Olympia A.C., Philadelphia, Pennsylvania, U.S.	
102	Win	86–5–11	Al Rogers	NWS	6	Jan 18, 1913	21 years, 351 days	Old City Hall, Pittsburgh, Pennsylvania, U.S.	
101	Win	85–5–11	Frank Mantell	TKO	15 (15)	Jan 9, 1913	21 years, 342 days	Thornton, Rhode Island, U.S.	
100	Win	84–5–11	Gus Christie	NWS	10	Jan 1, 1913	21 years, 334 days	Auditorium (Virginia Ave.), Indianapolis, Indiana, U.S.	
99	Win	83–5–11	Harry Ramsey	NWS	10	Dec 19, 1912	21 years, 321 days	Cincinnati, Ohio, U.S.	
98	Win	82–5–11	Gus Christie	NWS	10	Dec 11, 1912	21 years, 313 days	Auditorium, Indianapolis, Indiana, U.S.	
97	Win	81–5–11	Grant Clark	TKO	2 (?)	Nov 22, 1912	21 years, 294 days	Empire Theater, Indianapolis, Indiana, U.S.	
96	Win	80–5–11	George Chip	NWS	10	Nov 11, 1912	21 years, 283 days	Columbus, Ohio, U.S.	
95	Win	79–5–11	Jimmy Howard	PTS	8	Nov 8, 1912	21 years, 280 days	Memphis, Tennessee, U.S.	
94	Win	78–5–11	Jack Flynn	KO	4 (10)	Nov 4, 1912	21 years, 276 days	Eagles' Theater, Wabash, Indiana, U.S.	
93	Win	77–5–11	Battling Conners	KO	7 (?)	Oct 25, 1912	21 years, 266 days	Empire Theater, Indianapolis, Indiana, U.S.	
92	Win	76–5–11	Gus Christie	PTS	15	Oct 23, 1912	21 years, 264 days	Dayton, Ohio, U.S.	
91	Win	75–5–11	George Chip	NWS	6	Oct 19, 1912	21 years, 260 days	Old City Hall, Pittsburgh, Pennsylvania, U.S.	
90	Win	74–5–11	Emmett 'Kid' Wagner	NWS	10	Oct 17, 1912	21 years, 258 days	Johnstown, Pennsylvania, U.S.	
89	Win	73–5–11	Harry Ramsey	NWS	6	Oct 11, 1912	21 years, 252 days	Nonpareil A.C., Philadelphia, Pennsylvania, U.S.	
88	Win	72–5–11	Billy Donovan	KO	4 (?)	Aug 12, 1912	21 years, 192 days	Coliseum, Richmond, Indiana, U.S.	
87	Win	71–5–11	George Chip	NWS	10	Jul 25, 1912	21 years, 174 days	Empire Theater, Indianapolis, Indiana, U.S.	
86	Win	70–5–11	Joe Gorman	KO	6 (?)	Jul 22, 1912	21 years, 171 days	Southern A.C., Memphis, Tennessee, U.S.	
85	Win	69–5–11	Joe Thomas	TKO	8 (10)	Jul 4, 1912	21 years, 153 days	Terre Haute, Indiana, U.S.	
84	Win	68–5–11	George K.O. Brown	NWS	12	Jun 16, 1912	21 years, 135 days	Winnipeg, Manitoba, Canada	
83	Win	67–5–11	Jack Twin Sullivan	NWS	10	Jun 12, 1912	21 years, 131 days	Convention Hall, Buffalo, New York, U.S.	
82	Win	66–5–11	Hugo Kelly	KO	3 (10)	May 28, 1912	21 years, 116 days	Empire Theater, Indianapolis, Indiana, U.S.	
81	Loss	65–5–11	Frank Klaus	NWS	10	May 3, 1912	21 years, 91 days	Madison Square Garden, New York City, New York, U.S.	
80	Loss	65–4–11	Frank Klaus	PTS	20	Mar 23, 1912	21 years, 50 days	Coffroth's Arena, Daly City, California, U.S.	Lost world middleweight title claim; For Klaus' world middleweight title claim
79	Win	65–3–11	Walter Coffey	PTS	10	Mar 7, 1912	21 years, 34 days	Wheelmen's Club, Oakland, California, U.S.	
78	Draw	64–3–11	Grant Clark	NWS	10	Feb 22, 1912	21 years, 20 days	Chamber of Commerce Arena, Columbus, Ohio, U.S.	
77	Win	64–3–10	George Chip	NWS	6	Feb 10, 1912	21 years, 8 days	Old City Hall, Pittsburgh, Pennsylvania, U.S.	
76	Win	63–3–10	Paddy Lavin	NWS	10	Feb 8, 1912	21 years, 6 days	Convention Hall, Buffalo, New York, U.S.	
75	Win	62–3–10	Jimmy Gardner	NWS	6	Feb 3, 1912	21 years, 1 day	National A.C., Philadelphia, Pennsylvania, U.S.	
74	Win	61–3–10	Billy Berger	NWS	12	Feb 1, 1912	20 years, 364 days	The Auditorium, Youngstown, Ohio, U.S.	
73	Win	60–3–10	Howard Wiggam	KO	2 (10)	Jan 26, 1912	20 years, 358 days	Tomlinson Hall, Indianapolis, Indiana, U.S.	
72	Win	59–3–10	Billy Griffith	NWS	6	Jan 20, 1912	20 years, 352 days	Old City Hall, Pittsburgh, Indiana, U.S.	
71	Win	58–3–10	Leo Florian Hauck	TKO	6 (10)	Jan 1, 1912	20 years, 333 days	Auditorium (Virginia Ave.), Indianapolis, Indiana, U.S.	Won world middleweight title claim
70	Draw	57–3–10	Frank Klaus	NWS	6	Dec 6, 1911	20 years, 307 days	Old City Hall, Pittsburgh, Pennsylvania, U.S.	
69	Win	57–3–9	George Chip	NWS	12	Nov 22, 1911	20 years, 293 days	Olympic A.C., Youngstown, Ohio, U.S.	
68	Win	56–3–9	George K.O. Brown	NWS	6	Nov 11, 1911	20 years, 282 days	Old City Hall, Pittsburgh, Pennsylvania, U.S.	
67	Win	55–3–9	Eddie McGoorty	NWS	10	Nov 1, 1911	20 years, 272 days	Auditorium (Virginia Ave.), Indianapolis, Indiana, U.S.	
66	Win	54–3–9	Ralph Erne	NWS	6	Oct 28, 1911	20 years, 268 days	Old City Hall, Pittsburgh, Pennsylvania, U.S.	
65	Win	53–3–9	Battling Levinsky	NWS	6	Oct 23, 1911	20 years, 263 days	American A.C., Philadelphia, Pennsylvania, U.S.	
64	Win	52–3–9	Jack Herrick	NWS	10	Oct 20, 1911	20 years, 260 days	South Bend, Indiana, U.S.	
63	Win	51–3–9	Jack Graham	KO	4 (10)	Oct 4, 1911	20 years, 244 days	Lakewood Park, Vincennes, Indiana, U.S.	
62	Loss	50–3–9	Eddie McGoorty	TKO	4 (10)	Sep 4, 1911	20 years, 214 days	Orleans A.C., New Orleans, Louisiana, U.S.	
61	Win	50–2–9	Glenn Coakley	NWS	10	Aug 23, 1911	20 years, 202 days	Lakewood Park, Vincennes, Indiana, U.S.	
60	Draw	49–2–9	Bob Moha	NWS	10	Jul 3, 1911	20 years, 151 days	International A.C., Buffalo, New York, U.S.	
59	Draw	49–2–8	Paddy Lavin	NWS	10	Jun 21, 1911	20 years, 139 days	Auditorium (Virginia Ave.), Indianapolis, Indiana, U.S.	
58	Win	49–2–7	Ralph Erne	NWS	10	Jun 5, 1911	20 years, 123 days	Muncie, Indiana, U.S.	
57	Win	48–2–7	Jack Herrick	NWS	6	May 20, 1911	20 years, 107 days	Pittsburgh A.A., Pittsburgh, Pennsylvania, U.S.	
56	Win	47–2–7	Bob Moha	NWS	10	May 3, 1911	20 years, 90 days	Auditorium (Virginia Ave.), Indianapolis, Indiana, U.S.	
55	Win	46–2–7	George Chip	NWS	10	Apr 28, 1911	20 years, 85 days	Fair Grounds Casino, Terre Haute, Indiana, U.S.	
54	Win	45–2–7	Jimmy Gardner	NWS	6	Apr 22, 1911	20 years, 79 days	Duquesne Garden, Pittsburgh, Pennsylvania, U.S.	
53	Win	44–2–7	Jack Stevens	KO	1 (?)	Apr 12, 1911	20 years, 69 days	Mt. Vernon, Indiana, U.S.	
52	Win	43–2–7	Billy Mayfield	KO	1 (8)	Apr 10, 1911	20 years, 67 days	Crawfordsville, Indiana, U.S.	
51	Win	42–2–7	Frank Mantell	PTS	12	Apr 4, 1911	20 years, 61 days	Armory A.A., Boston, Massachusetts, U.S.	
50	Win	41–2–7	Billy Clark	KO	4 (6)	Apr 1, 1911	20 years, 58 days	Old City Hall, Pittsburgh, Pennsylvania, U.S.	
49	Win	40–2–7	Mike "Twin" Sullivan	NWS	10	Mar 17, 1911	20 years, 43 days	International A.C., Buffalo, New York, U.S.	
48	Win	39–2–7	Young Loughrey	NWS	10	Mar 15, 1911	20 years, 41 days	Auditorium (Virginia Ave.), Indianapolis, Indiana, U.S.	
47	Win	38–2–7	Jimmy Mellody	TKO	3 (?)	Mar 14, 1911	20 years, 40 days	Brazil, Indiana, U.S.	
46	Win	37–2–7	Billy Berger	NWS	6	Mar 4, 1911	20 years, 30 days	Old City Hall, Pittsburgh, Pennsylvania, U.S.	
45	Win	36–2–7	Jimmy Gardner	NWS	10	Feb 22, 1911	20 years, 20 days	Auditorium (Virginia Ave.), Indianapolis, Indiana, U.S.	
44	Win	35–2–7	Young Loughrey	NWS	6	Feb 18, 1911	20 years, 16 days	Old City Hall, Pittsburgh, Pennsylvania, U.S.	
43	Draw	34–2–7	Mike Glover	NWS	6	Feb 4, 1911	20 years, 2 days	Old City Hall, Pittsburgh, Pennsylvania, U.S.	
42	Win	34–2–6	George Chip	PTS	15	Jan 25, 1911	19 years, 357 days	Gymnastic Club, Dayton, Ohio, U.S.	
41	Draw	33–2–6	Eddie McGoorty	NWS	12	Jan 11, 1911	19 years, 343 days	Selkirk Hall, Winnipeg, Manitoba, Canada	
40	Win	33–2–5	Harry Mansfield	NWS	6	Jan 2, 1911	19 years, 334 days	Old City Hall, Pittsburgh, Pennsylvania, U.S.	
39	Loss	32–2–5	Eddie McGoorty	NWS	10	Dec 16, 1910	19 years, 317 days	Fond du Lac, Wisconsin, U.S.	
38	Win	32–1–5	George K.O. Brown	PTS	20	Nov 28, 1910	19 years, 299 days	Springfield, Ohio, U.S.	
37	Win	31–1–5	Jack Herrick	NWS	12	Nov 11, 1910	19 years, 282 days	Auditorium Rink, Winnipeg, Manitoba, Canada	
36	Win	30–1–5	Billy Berger	NWS	6	Oct 29, 1910	19 years, 269 days	Old City Hall, Pittsburgh, Pennsylvania, U.S.	
35	Win	29–1–5	George Chip	NWS	6	Oct 21, 1910	19 years, 19 days	Old City Hall, Pittsburgh, Pennsylvania, U.S.	
34	Win	28–1–5	Jack Herrick	NWS	12	Oct 3, 1910	19 years, 243 days	Auditorium Rink, Winnipeg, Manitoba, Canada	
33	Loss	27–1–5	Jimmy Perry	NWS	6	Sep 17, 1910	19 years, 227 days	Old City Hall, Pittsburgh, Pennsylvania, U.S.	
32	Win	27–0–5	Jack Ryan	KO	6 (12)	Jul 28, 1910	19 years, 176 days	Grand Opera House, Anderson, Indiana, U.S.	
31	Win	26–0–5	Freddie Hicks	NWS	15	Jun 20, 1910	19 years, 138 days	Auditorium, Newark, New Jersey, U.S.	
30	Win	25–0–5	Howard Morrow	NWS	8	May 30, 1910	19 years, 117 days	Grand Opera House, Anderson, Indiana, U.S.	
29	Win	24–0–5	Dick Fitzpatrick	NWS	10	Apr 21, 1910	19 years, 78 days	Grand Opera House, Anderson, Indiana, U.S.	
28	Win	23–0–5	Rube May	TKO	5 (10)	Apr 2, 1910	19 years, 59 days	Grand Opera House, Anderson, Indiana, U.S.	
27	Win	22–0–5	Ike Garfinkle	NWS	?	Mar 11, 1910	19 years, 37 days	Elks Club, Olean, New York, U.S.	
26	Draw	21–0–5	Ray Bronson	PTS	8 (10)	Mar 8, 1910	19 years, 34 days	Grand Opera House, Anderson, Indiana, U.S.	The referee declared it a draw in the 8th, although the bout was scheduled for 10 rounds
25	Draw	21–0–4	Jimmy Cooley	PTS	6	Feb 8, 1910	19 years, 6 days	Mitchell Club, Indianapolis, Indiana, U.S.	
24	Win	21–0–3	Jap Roberts	KO	2 (10)	Jan 31, 1910	18 years, 363 days	Huber's Garden, Newport, Kentucky, U.S.	
23	Win	20–0–3	Jimmy Cooley	PTS	6	Dec 22, 1909	18 years, 323 days	Mitchell Club, Indianapolis, Indiana, U.S.	
22	Win	19–0–3	Kid Sparks	KO	2 (10)	Sep 19, 1909	18 years, 229 days	West Side A.C., McDonoughville, Louisiana, U.S.	
21	Win	18–0–3	Everett Reeves	KO	6 (8)	Jul 22, 1909	18 years, 170 days	Grand Opera House, Anderson, Indiana, U.S.	
20	Win	17–0–3	Tommy Scanlon	TKO	6 (10)	Jul 2, 1909	18 years, 150 days	Lakeview Theater, Terre Haute, Indiana, U.S.	
19	Win	16–0–3	Kid Sullivan	KO	3 (10)	May 28, 1909	18 years, 115 days	Terre Haute, Indiana, U.S.	
18	Win	15–0–3	Young Connors	PTS	5	May 10, 1909	18 years, 97 days	K of C Auditorium, Indianapolis, Indiana, U.S.	
17	Win	14–0–3	Kid Gray	TKO	2 (6)	Apr 2, 1909	18 years, 59 days	Mitchell Club, Indianapolis, Indiana, U.S.	
16	Win	13–0–3	Bobby Long	TKO	5 (6)	Mar 31, 1909	18 years, 57 days	Auditorium, Indianapolis, Indiana, U.S.	
15	Draw	12–0–3	Ray Bronson	PTS	6	Mar 12, 1909	18 years, 38 days	Hartford City A.C., Hartford City, Indiana, U.S.	
14	Win	12–0–2	Kid Griffin	KO	4 (?)	Mar 5, 1909	18 years, 31 days	Indianapolis, Indiana, U.S.	
13	Win	11–0–2	Pat Lark	NWS	6	Mar 3, 1909	18 years, 29 days	Auditorium, Indianapolis, Indiana, U.S.	
12	Win	10–0–2	Grant Clark	KO	6 (?)	Feb 24, 1909	18 years, 22 days	Columbus, Ohio, U.S.	
11	Win	9–0–2	Charles Humphries	KO	2 (10)	Feb 20, 1909	18 years, 18 days	Marion Club, Indianapolis, Indiana, U.S.	
10	Win	8–0–2	Kid Simms	KO	3 (4)	Feb 3, 1909	18 years, 1 day	Auditorium, Indianapolis, Indiana, U.S.	
9	Win	7–0–2	Joe McAree	DQ	4 (6)	Jan 22, 1909	17 years, 355 days	Auditorium, Indianapolis, Indiana, U.S.	
8	Win	6–0–2	Tommy Clark	PTS	10	Dec 19, 1908	17 years, 321 days	Marion Club, Indianapolis, Indiana, U.S.	
7	Draw	5–0–2	Ted Malone	PTS	10	Nov 20, 1908	17 years, 292 days	Gymnastic Club, Dayton, Ohio, U.S.	
6	Win	5–0–1	Pat Lark	KO	4 (?)	Nov 13, 1908	17 years, 285 days	Indianapolis, Indiana, U.S.	
5	Win	4–0–1	Tom DeLane	KO	4 (?)	Oct 27, 1908	17 years, 268 days	Columbus, Ohio, U.S.	
4	Win	3–0–1	Lem Potter	KO	4 (?)	Oct 5, 1908	17 years, 246 days	Indianapolis, Indiana, U.S.	
3	Win	2–0–1	Jack Laffey	KO	4 (6)	Sep 19, 1908	17 years, 230 days	Marion Club, Indianapolis, Indiana, U.S.	
2	Win	1–0–1	Joe McAree	PTS	6	Jul 20, 1908	17 years, 169 days	Indianapolis, Indiana, U.S.	
1	Draw	0–0–1	Fortville Kid Brown	PTS	6	Apr 18, 1908	17 years, 76 days	Marion Club, Indianapolis, Indiana, U.S.	

== Primary boxing achievements ==
Awards and achievements
Preceded by Philadelphia Jack O'Brien; Abandoned	World Light Heavyweight Champion; 14 April 1914 – 24 October 1916	Succeeded by Battling Levinsky

== See also ==
- List of light heavyweight boxing champions
