= Hojer (surname) =

Hojer, Højer or Höjer is the surname of the following people

- Antonín Hojer (1894–1964), Czechoslovak footballer
- Axel Höjer (1890–1974), Swedish physician
- František Hojer (1896–1940), Czechoslovak footballer, brother of Antonín
- Gerda Höjer (1893–1974), Swedish nurse and politician
- Gunnar Höjer (1875–1936), Swedish gymnast
- Jesper Højer (born 1978/79), Danish businessman, CEO of Lidl
- Ladislav Hojer (1958–1986), Czechoslovak serial killer
- Lars Højer (born 1970), Danish footballer
- Steffen Højer (born 1973), Danish footballer
