= Hoosier Township =

Hoosier Township may refer to the following townships in the United States:

- Hoosier Township, Clay County, Illinois
- Hoosier Township, Kingman County, Kansas
- List of Indiana townships
