= Ambroise-Louis-Marie d'Hozier =

French officer of arms (1764–1846)

- Born: 1764
- Died: 1846 (aged 81–82)
- Other name: President d'Hozier
- Title: Juge d'armes of France; President of the cour des comptes, aides et finances of Normandy
- Relatives: Louis-Pierre d'Hozier (uncle)

Coat of arms

Ambroise-Louis-Marie d'Hozier (1764–1846), nephew of Louis-Pierre d'Hozier, was the last of the juges d'armes of France. He held the position of president of the cour des comptes, aides et finances of Normandy, and was therefore generally known as President d'Hozier, to distinguish him from the other members of the family.

After the Bourbon Restoration he was employed to verify French armorial bearings for the conseil du sceau des titres. He died in obscurity.

His collection, which was purchased in 1851 by the Bibliothèque Nationale, comprised 136 volumes, 165 portfolios of documents and 200 packets of extracts from title-deeds, known as the Carrés d'Hozier.
