= Pierre d'Hozier =

French genealogist (1592–1660)

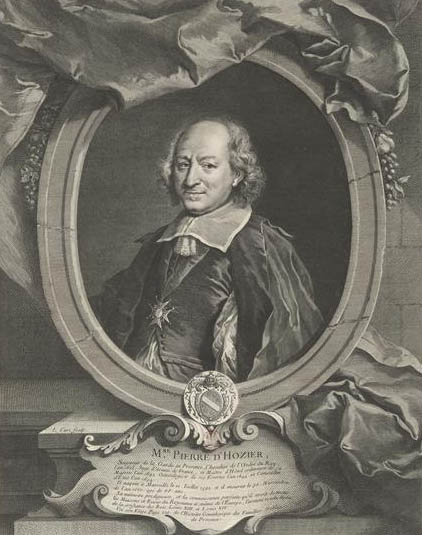
Portrait of d'Hosier

Pierre d'Hozier, seigneur de la Garde (July 10, 1592 – December 1, 1660), was a French genealogist.

== Life ==
He was born in Marseille. He belonged to the household of the Marshal de Créqui and gave him aid in his genealogical investigations.

In 1616 he entered upon some extensive researches into the genealogy of the noble families of the kingdom, in which work he was aided by his prodigious memory for dates, names and family relationships, as well as by his profound knowledge of heraldry. In 1634 he was appointed historiographer and genealogist of France, and in 1641 juge d'armes of France, an officer corresponding nearly to the Garter king-of-arms in England. In 1643 he was employed to verify the claims to nobility of the pages and equerries of the king's household.

He accumulated a large number of documents, but published comparatively little, his principal works being Recueil armorial des anciennes maisons de Bretagne (1638); Les noms, surnoms, qualitez, armes et blasons des chevaliers ct officiers de l'ordre du Saint-Esprit (1634); and the genealogies of the houses of La Rochefoucauld (1654), Bournonville (1657) and Amanze (1659).

== Death and legacy ==
He died in Paris on 1 December 1660. At his death his collections comprised more than 150 volumes or portfolios of documents and papers relating to the genealogy of the principal families in France.

Of his six sons, only two survived him. His eldest son, Louis Roger d'Hozier (1634–1708), succeeded him as juge d'armes, but became blind in 1675, and was obliged to surrender his office to his brother, Charles René d'Hozier.
