= Dan Flynn (boxer) =

American boxer

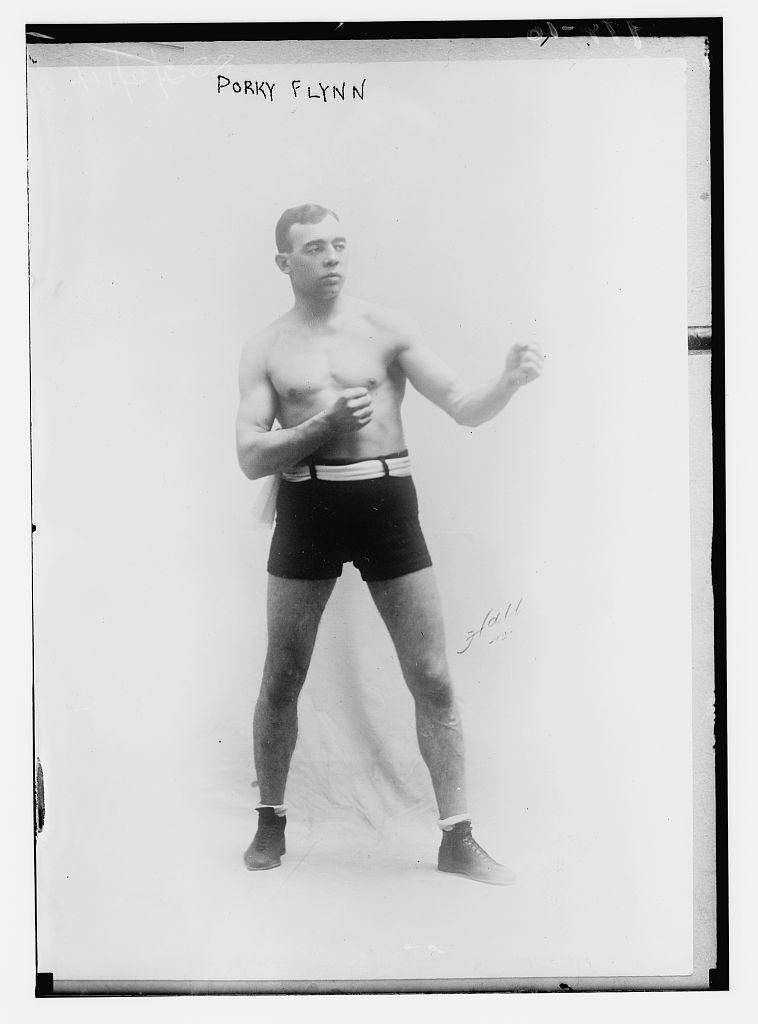

Personal information
- Nationality: AmericanUSA
- Born: Dan Flynn; April 5, 1888 Boston, Massachusetts
- Died: 1946 (aged 57–58)
- Weight: Heavyweight

Boxing career

Boxing record
- Total fights: 92
- Wins: 26
- Win by KO: 6
- Losses: 22
- Draws: 8
- No contests: 36

Dan Flynn (April 5, 1888 – 1946) was an American Boxer known as much for his ring skills as for his punch and dirty tactics. He apparently earned the nickname "Porky" from his pre-boxing days working in a sausage factory. He had a record of 26 wins (6 by knockout), 22 losses, 8 draws, and 36 no decisions.

== Biography ==
He was born on April 5, 1888. His first fight was in 1906. In his career, he fought the likes of Jack Dempsey twice (losing both times by first round knockout), Fred Fulton (losing by foul in the 4th round), Joe Jeanette, and Battling Levinsky. He retired in 1923. He spent the remainder of his life as an iron-worker. He died in 1946.
