= Jim Coffey =

Irish boxer

Personal information
- Nicknames: The Roscommon Giant, The Dublin Giant
- Nationality: Irish
- Born: 27 January 1890 County Roscommon, Ireland
- Died: 20 December 1959 (aged 69) Dublin, Ireland
- Height: 6 ft 3 in (1.91 m)
- Weight: Heavyweight

Boxing career
- Stance: Orthodox

Boxing record
- Total fights: 70
- Wins: 49
- Win by KO: 38
- Losses: 15
- Draws: 3

James Coffey (27 January 1890 – 20 December 1959) was an Irish heavyweight boxer. Despite only taking up boxing upon emigrating to the United States of America at the age of 20, Jim rapidly rose through the rankings to become an acknowledged contender for the World title during the so-called "Great White Hope" era of the sport.

== Early life ==
Jim Coffey was born in the small village of Tully in the north west corner of County Roscommon, in the West of Ireland. Although his birth is often listed at 16 January 1891, his birth certificate shows he was born on 27 January 1890. The fifth of 10 children born to John Coffey and his wife Ann née Quinn), as a youth his main sporting interest lay in the game of gaelic handball. In 1910, at the age of 20, he left Ireland and emigrated to New York.

In New York he found employment as a trolley motorman on Third Avenue. On a cold day in Autumn 1911, he had a chance meeting on his trolley with a policeman called Tom Shaw. Shaw was a boxer and wrestler of note in New York police circles and suggested that they have a little wrestling match in the snow to keep warm. In less than a minute the policeman was lying flat on his back. Shaw invited Coffey to come around to the policemans’ gym and it was there the Irishman first donned the gloves.

== Boxing career ==
Jim Coffey made his debut against Nick Muller in the New York Polo A.C. on 26 January 1912. Watching Jim's performance that night was Billy Gibson, a boxing promoter and manager. Following Coffey's victory over Muller, Gibson went to the dressing rooms and offered to take over the Irishman's affairs. As a member of the Gibson stable of boxers, Coffey got to train with famous names such as Joe Jeanette and Bombardier Billy Wells.

Over the next three years he developed a large following, particularly amongst the Irish-American population of New York. A noted fan was famous tenor Count John McCormack.

His career progressed with victories over established heavyweight contenders of the day, such as Fireman Jim Flynn, Alfred "Soldier" Kearns, Arthur Pelkey and Ed "Gunboat" Smith. Between October 1915 and January 1916, he twice fought Frank Moran in Madison Square Garden, with the second bout being an eliminator for who would go on to challenge new Heavyweight World Champion Jess Willard. Unfortunately for Coffey, Moran won both contests.

Following his losses to Moran, Coffey continued to box, taking on other famous names from the time, including Carl Morris, Battling Levinsky, Joe Jeanette and Harry Greb. However, he never again came close to challenging for the world title.

Jim Coffey's last professional fight was a 15th round defeat to Martin Burke in the Tulane Arena, New Orleans, on 18 November 1921.

== Later life ==
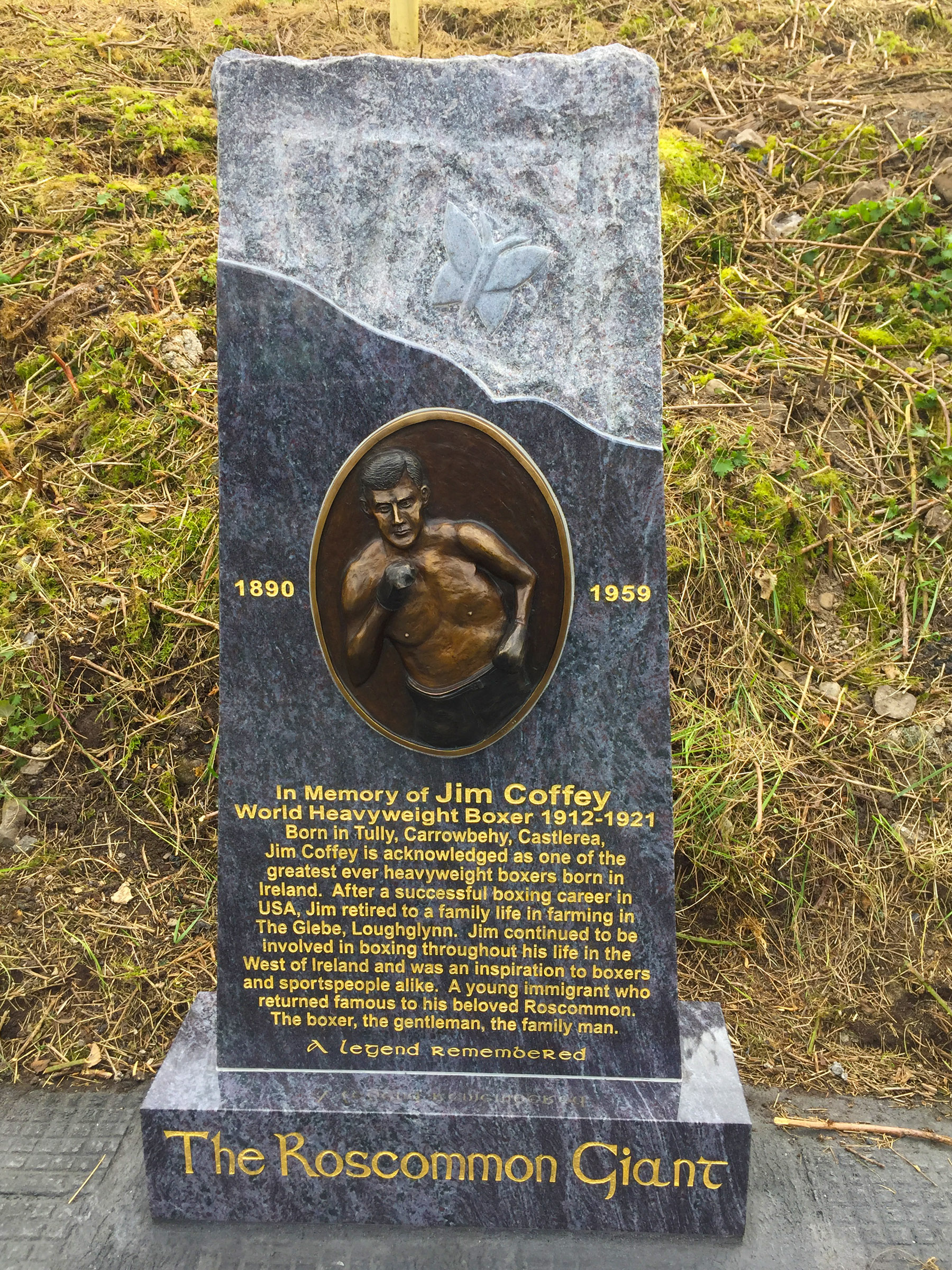
Monument erected in memory of Jim Coffey in his native Tully, County Roscommon.

Jim Coffey returned to Ireland for good in 1923 and married schoolteacher Kate Kenny in December of that year. Following his retirement from boxing, Jim took up a career in farming, having bought the Glebe Farm in the village of Kilruddane near Loughglynn during his illustrious sporting career. Jim and Kate had four children: Paul, Kathleen, James (Seamus) and Patrick. Jim Coffey retired to Dublin and died on 20 December 1959.

== Legacy ==
Jim Coffey was the founder of the Loughglynn Boxing Club which exists to the present day.

On 16 April 2017, the community of Loughglynn and Gorthaganny unveiled a monument to Jim Coffey adjacent to his place of birth in the townland of Tully. The commemorative committee behind the monument also published a book Jim Coffey: The Roscommon Giant celebrating his life and career.

== Sources ==
- The Roscommon Giant: A boxing biography, Seamus Coffey, 2008
