= Battling Levinsky =

American boxer (1890–1949)

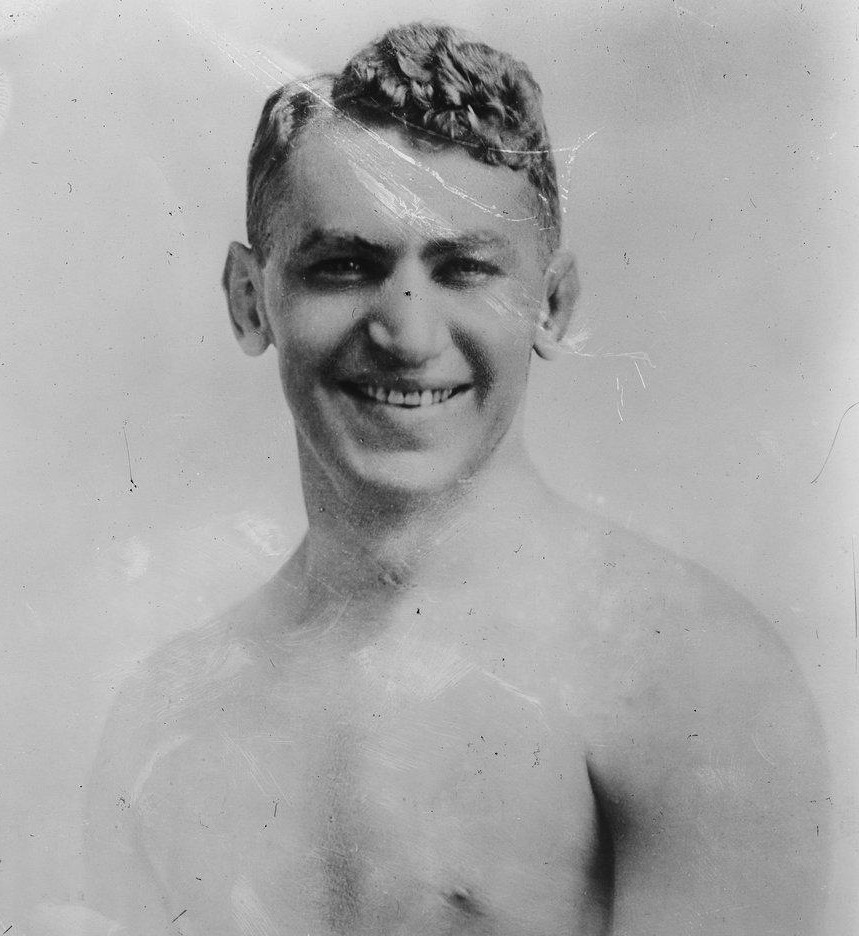
- Levinsky in 1920

Personal information
- Born: Barney Lebowitz; June 10, 1890 Philadelphia, Pennsylvania, U.S.
- Died: February 12, 1949 (aged 58) Philadelphia, Pennsylvania, U.S.
- Height: 5 ft 11 in (1.80 m)
- Weight: Light Heavyweight

Boxing career
- Reach: 70 in (178 cm)
- Stance: Orthodox

Boxing record
- Total fights: 289
- Wins: 196
- Win by KO: 30
- Losses: 55
- Draws: 38

Barney "Battling" Levinsky (born Lebowitz; June 10, 1890 – February 12, 1949) was an American boxer who was the world light heavyweight champion from 1916 to 1920. Statistical boxing website BoxRec lists Levinsky as the #12 ranked light heavyweight of all time, while The Ring Magazine founder Nat Fleischer placed him at #9. The International Boxing Research Organization rates Levinsky as the 20th best light heavyweight ever. He was inducted into the Ring Magazine Hall of Fame in 1966, the International Jewish Sports Hall of Fame in 1982, and the International Boxing Hall of Fame in 2000.

== Early life ==
Levinsky was born in 1890 in Philadelphia, the third son of seven children of Samuel and Lena Lebrowitz, Russian Jews who had emigrated from London. His father was a tailor, and Barney shined shoes and sold newspapers after school to help his six siblings. In his earliest boxing days, he sold jewelry during the day, but boxed in the evening at the clubs in Philadelphia, probably to hide his fledgling boxing career from his parents.

== Boxing career ==
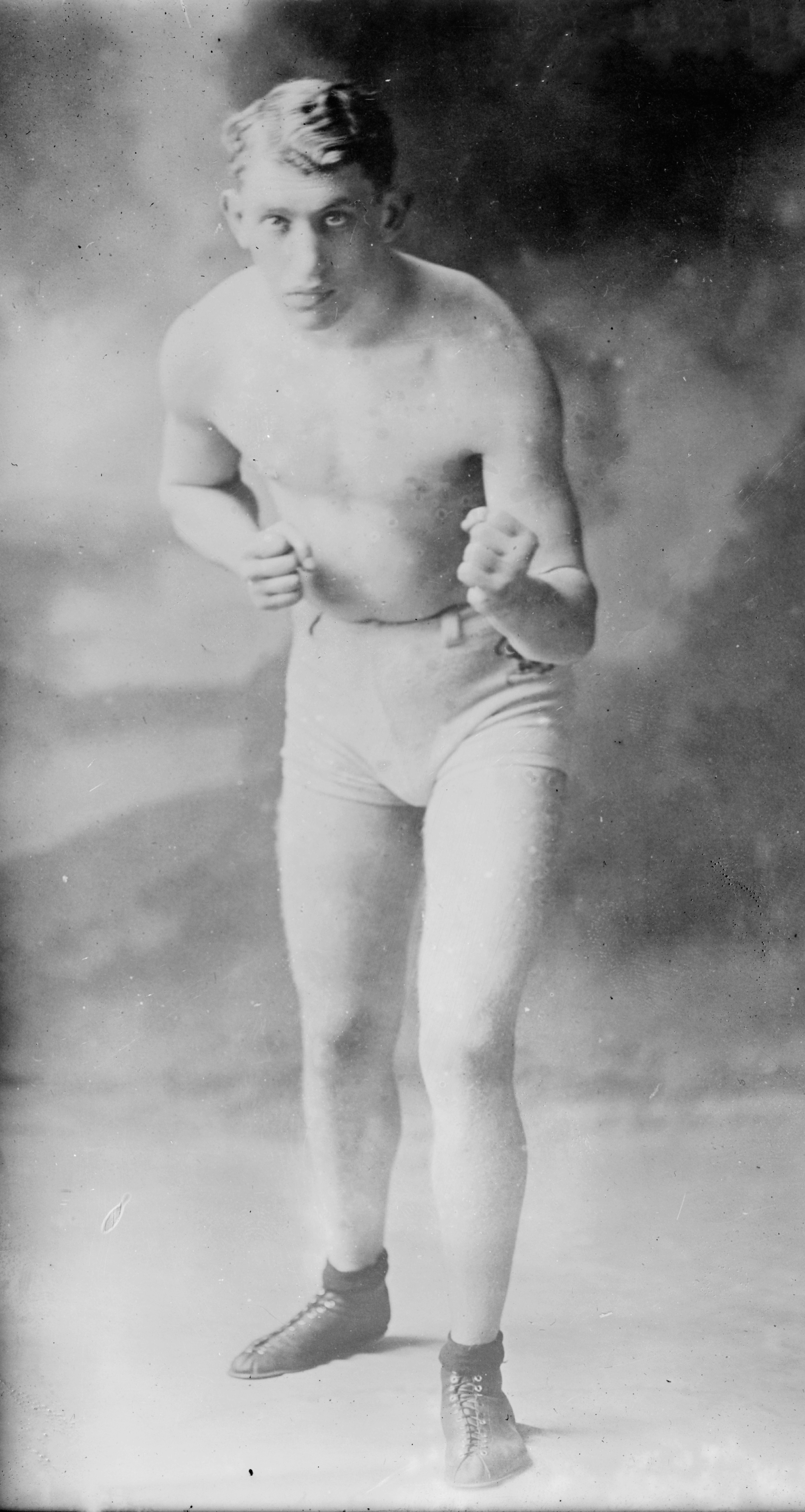
Full-length portrait of Levinsky

=== Career beginnings ===
Battling Levinsky began his boxing career under the name Barney Williams. He fought his first recorded match in 1910 at Philadelphia's Diamond Lew Bailey's Broadway Athletic Club, with a first-round knockout of his opponent, Mat Ryan, who outweighed him by over sixty pounds. He received little attention until he took on "Dumb" Dan Morgan as his manager in 1913, who changed Barney's name along with his boxing fortunes. He was known for possessing incredible defensive skills, not frequently winning by knockout, but often leaving the ring at the end of a fight without having received a truly damaging blow.

Morgan came up with his name of "Battling Levinsky" to obscure the fact that Barney's boxing style was actually more defensive than aggressive in order to give his opposition the impression that he was an aggressive puncher.

Because Levinsky first entered the pro ranks as Barney Williams around 1906, many of his fights between 1906 and 1910, when he became "Battling Levinsky", were not recorded by boxing publications, particularly Nat Fleischer's Ring Record Book. He did not officially become "Battling Levinsky" until 1913. In his first 100 fights between 1910 and 1914, he lost only three of his bouts.

Between 1914 and 1918, Levinsky fought 127 times, averaging an impressive 37 fights a year, even for his era. Levinsky fought 37 times in 1914 — 9 times in the month of January alone. In January 1915, he began the year with two 10-round bouts on New Year's Day — 1 each in Brooklyn, New York City and 12 round bout in Waterbury, Connecticut.

=== World light heavyweight champion, 1916 ===
After two title-match losses to world light heavyweight champion Jack Dillon, (April 1914 and April 1916), Levinsky finally wrested the crown from him on October 24, 1916, in a twelve-round points decision in Boston. The new champion was believed by many to have won every round but the fifth which was even. Levinsky had around a three-inch advantage in height, a few extra inches in reach, and as much as a ten-pound weight advantage. Though he was not known as a strong puncher, his defensive skills were considered exceptional, and they weighed heavily in his victory. His better blows were landed with his left, often to the jaw and body of Dillon. Fatigued by the fifth, Levinsky carried the match after the sixth, landing blows to the face, jaw and body of Dillon, who landed only a few blows that usually lacked steam. The referee's decision was met with approval by the fans. Some reporters speculated that Dillon's hands were still sore from his bout the previous night with Larry Williams, a very capable light heavyweight, in Philadelphia. Many of Dillon's blows were body punches, but he tried to go to the face or jaw on several occasions, often missing due to Levinsky's fluid defense. Dillon's dangerous right, which landed on a few occasions in the second, usually glanced off Levinsky's face for the remainder of the bout, as the Philadelphia fighter showed his ability to move away from Dillon's most valuable blow, while occasionally countering with rapid left jabs.

Harry Greb defeated Levinsky in a somewhat close six-round newspaper decision of a no decision bout on August 6, 1918, at Philadelphia's Shibe Park. Though the Wilkes-Barre Times Leader had Levinsky winning four of the six rounds, the majority of local papers had Levinsky winning the battle. In their ten-round bout in Buffalo on February 17, 1919, Levinsky countered and blocked well against Greb's characteristic aggressive two handed attack, and the Pittsburgh Post wrote that the contest was "one of the most brilliant big glove exhibitions ever staged", but many local papers agreed with the Buffalo Enquirer, that "Greb won by his aggressive attack."

Levinsky met future champion Jack Dempsey on November 6, 1918, and lost in Philadelphia from a third-round knockout administered by a left to the jaw. Dempsey connected on several occasions in the first two rounds, landing short rights and lefts that seriously affected his opponent. Dempsey was particularly effective with his left, which he often followed with a right to the body. Dempsey had an advantage in height, weight and reach, which he used to his benefit throughout the match. He was not bothered by Levinsky's frequently used left jabs, and set a very fast pace for Levinsky who at twenty-seven was a critical five years older. By most records, it was the first time Levinsky had ever lost a match by knockout.

==== Loss of light heavy title, 1920 ====
On October 12, 1920, fifty-nine bouts later, and almost four years to the day after he took the title, he lost his championship in a fourth round knock out to France's enormously popular Georges Carpentier in Jersey City, New Jersey. Before a crowd of 15,000, after a series of rights and lefts from Carpentier, Levinsky lost his title as he fell from a heavy right to the jaw, one minute and seven seconds into the fourth round. Levinsky received his largest purse of $25,000 for the fight. Carpentier had dominated the battle, and sent Levinsky down twice for counts of eight. Struggling to rise after being counted out, the vanquished Levinsky had to be brought to his feet and partly carried to his corner by Jack Britton, who had assisted him with the bout.

Though not unique for his boxing era, Levinsky fought many of his opponents multiple times. According to historian Ken Blady, Levinsky fought Dillon a total of ten times in his career. Perhaps his worthiest opponent, Nat Fleischer once rated Dillon the third greatest Light Heavyweight of all time while boxing promoter Charley Rose placed him at #2. Levinsky met Jim Flynn, the only man to ever knock out Jack Dempsey, and heavyweight "Porky" Flynn a total of nine times. In his New York bout with Flynn on July 30, 1913, Levinsky's strong rally in the last round allowed him to end the match with a draw as Flynn had taken the third, fourth, seventh, eighth and ninth rounds.

=== Career record ===
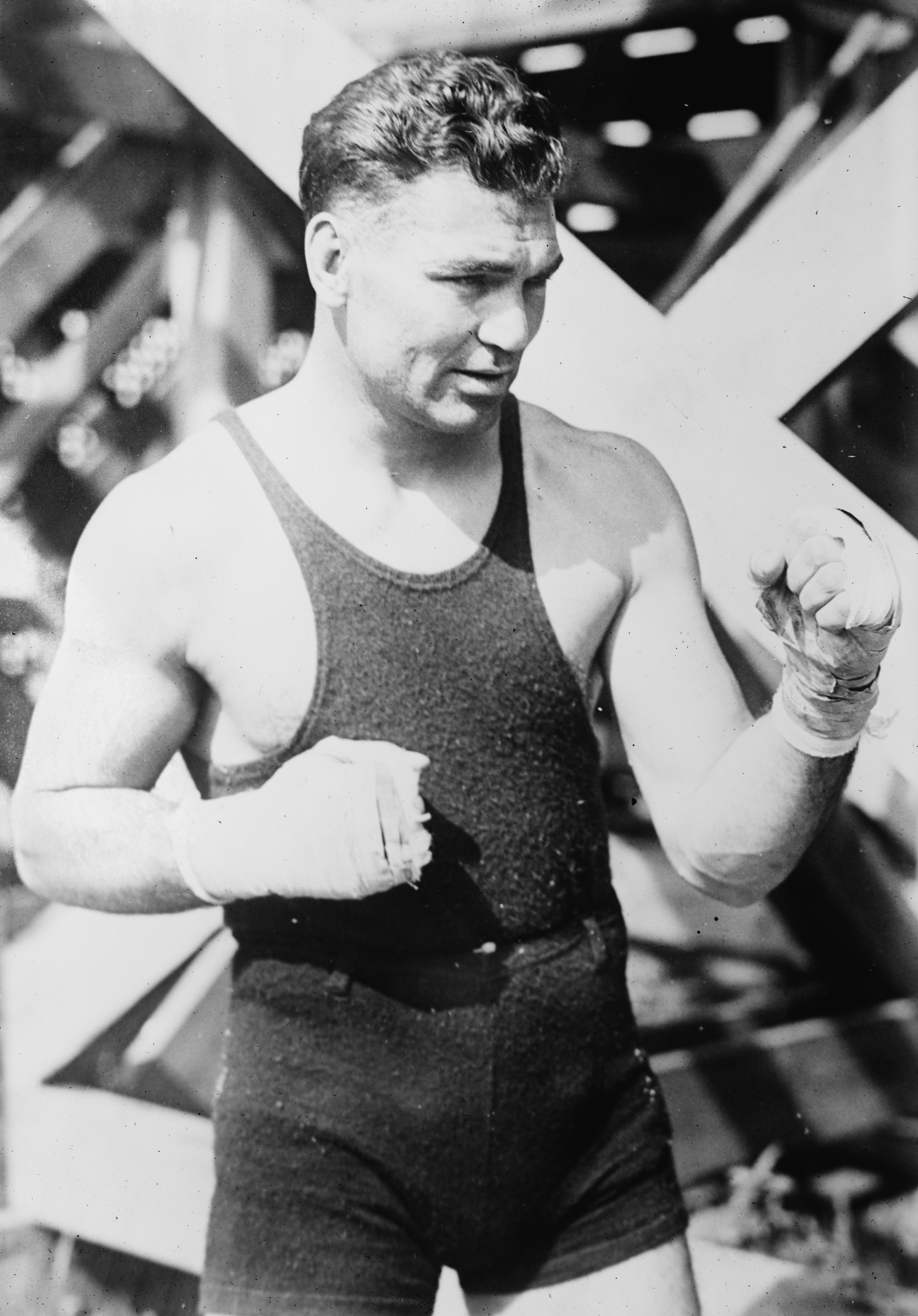
Jack Dempsey, future heavyweight champion

In an era when the winners of bouts could not be decided by the votes of referees and boxing judges, and titles changed hands only in the case of a knockout, Levinsky fought all comers, including losses to future heavyweight champions Gene Tunney and Jack Dempsey.

He also fought the 1923 World Middleweight Champion Harry Greb at least three times between 1918 and 1919, successfully defending his Light Heavyweight title in each meeting. Levinsky loved to fight, although his claim to having fought close to 500 bouts has not been fully substantiated.

His official professional record: 287 bouts – won 196 (30 KOs), lost 54, drew 37.

In his early career, Levinsky was managed by Fred Douglas (1910–11) and Jack Hanlon (1911–13), and then fell primarily under the management of Dan Morgan until 1922. Al Lippe managed him in his comeback, from 1926 to 1929.

== Life after boxing ==
After his loss to Gene Tunney on January 13, 1922, Levinsky attempted to retire from boxing and entered the Real Estate business. Around 1926, he returned to the ring as a heavyweight after a series of financial losses and faced Tommy Madden, beginning his four-year comeback. He fought around forty-two times in his comeback, losing only twelve matches. After losing badly to Herman Weiner on January 15, 1929, he seriously discussed retirement before boxing one more time the following year in October 1930 in New York, beating Joe Simms in three rounds.

Levinsky's son Stanley was killed in the Battle of the Bulge, WWII. His daughter Harriet, a graduate and valedictorian at West Philadelphia High School, currently resides in Lancaster, PA. Levinsky's grandchildren are Stanley Solodky, Barry Solodky, and Susan Oldham.

Levinsky invested much of his total boxing winnings of $250,000 in real estate, but lost most of it in the Depression of the early 1930s. During the height of the depression, in the mid-1930s Levinsky worked for the Works Progress Administration (WPA). After his retirement from the ring in 1930, he sold many of the remaining Apartment houses he owned, and purchased a Meat Slaughtering House in Chicago which he retained until around 1947, though continuing to live in Philadelphia.

After an illness of several months that had been aggravated by a car accident on January 17, Levinsky died at his home on February 12, 1949, in Philadelphia, Pennsylvania, at the age of 59. He was buried at Har Zion Cemetery.

He was inducted into the Boxing Hall of Fame in 1966, and is in both the Pennsylvania Hall of Fame and Jewish Sports Hall of Fame in Israel.

== Professional boxing record ==
All information in this section is derived from BoxRec, unless otherwise stated.

=== Official record ===
| 289 fights | 70 wins | 20 losses |
|---|---|---|
| By knockout | 30 | 4 |
| By decision | 38 | 14 |
| By disqualification | 2 | 2 |
| Draws | 14 | |
| Newspaper decisions/draws | 185 | |

All newspaper decisions are officially regarded as "no decision" bouts and are not counted in the win/loss/draw column.

| No. | Result | Record | Opponent | Type | Round | Date | Location | Notes |
|---|---|---|---|---|---|---|---|---|
| 289 | Win | 70–20–14 (185) | Joe Sims | TKO | 3 (10) | Oct 21, 1930 | Broadway Arena, Brooklyn, New York City, New York, U.S. | |
| 288 | Loss | 69–20–14 (185) | Herman Weiner | TKO | 1 (8) | Jan 15, 1929 | Armory, Hagerstown, Maryland, U.S. | |
| 287 | Loss | 69–19–14 (185) | Otto von Porat | TKO | 5 (10) | Jan 11, 1929 | Armory, Grand Rapids, Michigan, U.S. | |
| 286 | Win | 69–18–14 (185) | Pietro Corri | PTS | 10 | Jan 4, 1929 | Red Men's Hall, Bridgeport, Connecticut, U.S. | |
| 285 | Loss | 68–18–14 (185) | Marty Gallagher | PTS | 12 | Dec 3, 1928 | 104th Regiment Armory, Baltimore, Maryland, U.S. | |
| 284 | Draw | 68–17–14 (185) | Tom Toner | PTS | 8 | Nov 1, 1928 | New Broadway A.C., Philadelphia, Pennsylvania, U.S. | |
| 283 | Win | 68–17–13 (185) | Bill Daring | PTS | 8 | Oct 19, 1928 | Grimes Battery, Portsmouth, Virginia, U.S. | |
| 282 | Win | 67–17–13 (185) | Pietro Corri | PTS | 8 | Oct 18, 1928 | Passaic, New Jersey, U.S. | |
| 281 | Win | 66–17–13 (185) | Herman Weiner | PTS | 8 | Sep 21, 1928 | Riverview Park, Baltimore, Maryland, U.S. | |
| 280 | Win | 65–17–13 (185) | Billy Henderson | NWS | 6 | Sep 18, 1928 | Greenville, Maine, U.S. | |
| 279 | Loss | 65–17–13 (184) | Tony Youkonis | UD | 10 | Aug 20, 1928 | Fair Grounds Arena, Allentown, Pennsylvania, U.S. | |
| 278 | Loss | 65–16–13 (184) | Phil Mercurio | NWS | 10 | Jul 13, 1928 | Boardwalk Arena, Long Branch, New Jersey, U.S. | |
| 277 | Win | 65–16–13 (183) | Chuck Wiggins | DQ | 5 (10) | Jul 4, 1928 | Memorial Stadium, Greensboro, North Carolina, U.S. | |
| 276 | Win | 64–16–13 (183) | Tex McEwan | DQ | 4 (10) | Jul 2, 1928 | Tacoma Bowl, Dayton, Ohio, U.S. | |
| 275 | Loss | 63–16–13 (183) | Emmett Rocco | UD | 10 | Jun 25, 1928 | Jolly Bowl, New Castle, Pennsylvania, U.S. | |
| 274 | Win | 63–15–13 (183) | Emmett Rocco | NWS | 10 | Jun 6, 1928 | Armory, Akron, Ohio, U.S. | |
| 273 | Win | 63–15–13 (182) | Benny Ross | PTS | 10 | May 21, 1928 | Laurel Garden, Newark, New Jersey, U.S. | |
| 272 | Win | 62–15–13 (182) | Clem Johnson | PTS | 8 | Apr 30, 1928 | Chestnut Street Auditorium, Harrisburg, Pennsylvania, U.S. | |
| 271 | Win | 61–15–13 (182) | Jim Sigman | PTS | 10 | Apr 23, 1928 | Saginaw, Michigan, U.S. | |
| 270 | Loss | 60–15–13 (182) | Jack McAuliffe II | NWS | 10 | Apr 17, 1928 | Coliseum, Saint Louis, Missouri, U.S. | |
| 269 | Draw | 60–15–13 (181) | Tiny Roebuck | NWS | 10 | Apr 11, 1928 | Convention Hall, Kansas City, Missouri, U.S. | |
| 268 | Win | 60–15–13 (180) | James Jay Lawless | PTS | 10 | Apr 2, 1928 | Laurel Garden, Newark, New Jersey, U.S. | |
| 267 | Win | 59–15–13 (180) | K.O. Samson | TKO | 2 (8) | Mar 26, 1928 | Waltz Dream Arena, Atlantic City, New Jersey, U.S. | |
| 266 | Loss | 58–15–13 (180) | Jack Gagnon | PTS | 10 | Mar 9, 1928 | New Bedford, Massachusetts, U.S. | |
| 265 | Win | 58–14–13 (180) | Earl Blue | PTS | 6 | Mar 5, 1928 | Broadway Arena, Brooklyn, New York City, New York, U.S. | |
| 264 | Win | 57–14–13 (180) | Marcel DeRose | TKO | 2 (10) | Feb 27, 1928 | Bristol Arena, New Bedford, Massachusetts, U.S. | |
| 263 | Win | 56–14–13 (180) | Jack Gagnon | PTS | 10 | Feb 17, 1928 | Mechanics Building, Boston, Massachusetts, U.S. | |
| 262 | Draw | 55–14–13 (180) | Sandy Seifert | PTS | 10 | Feb 6, 1928 | Motor Square Garden, Pittsburgh, Pennsylvania, U.S. | |
| 261 | Win | 55–14–12 (180) | Joe Lohman | PTS | 10 | Nov 28, 1927 | Arena, Philadelphia, Pennsylvania, U.S. | |
| 260 | Win | 54–14–12 (180) | Matt Adgie | PTS | 10 | Nov 16, 1927 | 108th Field Artillery Armory, Philadelphia, Pennsylvania, U.S. | |
| 259 | Win | 53–14–12 (180) | George Gemas | PTS | 10 | Nov 2, 1927 | 108th Field Artillery Armory, Philadelphia, Pennsylvania, U.S. | |
| 258 | Win | 52–14–12 (180) | Willie Walker | PTS | 8 | Oct 28, 1927 | Auditorium, Norristown, Pennsylvania, U.S. | |
| 257 | Win | 51–14–12 (180) | Teddy Jackson | KO | 4 (10) | Oct 24, 1927 | Floral Park Arena, North Bergen, New Jersey, U.S. | |
| 256 | Win | 50–14–12 (180) | Clem Johnson | PTS | 10 | Sep 29, 1927 | Carnival Park, West Manayunk, Pennsylvania, U.S. | |
| 255 | Loss | 49–14–12 (180) | Matt Adgie | MD | 10 | Sep 8, 1927 | Baker Bowl, Philadelphia, Pennsylvania, U.S. | |
| 254 | Loss | 49–13–12 (180) | Cuban Bobby Brown | NWS | 8 | Aug 15, 1927 | Dog Track, Atlantic City, New Jersey, U.S. | |
| 253 | Win | 49–13–12 (179) | Ray Neuman | PTS | 10 | Feb 7, 1927 | Arena, Philadelphia, Pennsylvania, U.S. | |
| 252 | Win | 48–13–12 (179) | George Gemas | PTS | 8 | Jan 1, 1927 | Norristown, Pennsylvania, U.S. | |
| 251 | Loss | 47–13–12 (179) | Jack Gagnon | PTS | 10 | Dec 23, 1926 | Crescent Rink, Lowell, Massachusetts, U.S. | |
| 250 | Win | 47–12–12 (179) | Jimmy Moran | KO | 1 (8) | Nov 18, 1926 | Waltz Dream Arena, Atlantic City, New Jersey, U.S. | |
| 249 | Loss | 46–12–12 (179) | Young Stribling | NWS | 10 | Nov 11, 1926 | Coliseum, Des Moines, Iowa, U.S. | |
| 248 | Win | 46–12–12 (178) | George Gemas | PTS | 10 | Sep 13, 1926 | Carnival Park, West Manayunk, Pennsylvania, U.S. | |
| 247 | Win | 45–12–12 (178) | Tommy Madden | KO | 1 (8) | Aug 31, 1926 | Lauer's Park, Reading, Pennsylvania, U.S. | |
| 246 | Loss | 44–12–12 (178) | Gene Tunney | PTS | 12 | Jan 13, 1922 | Madison Square Garden, Manhattan, New York City, New York, U.S. | For vacant ABA light-heavyweight title |
| 245 | Draw | 44–11–12 (178) | Bob Roper | PTS | 12 | Nov 24, 1921 | Broadway Auditorium, Buffalo, New York, U.S. | |
| 244 | Win | 44–11–11 (178) | Mike McTigue | NWS | 10 | Sep 14, 1921 | Mount Royal Arena, Montreal, Quebec, Canada | |
| 243 | Win | 44–11–11 (177) | Sergeant Ray Smith | NWS | 10 | Sep 8, 1921 | Exhibition Grounds, Quebec City, Quebec, Canada | |
| 242 | Win | 44–11–11 (176) | Eddie Ricord | NWS | 10 | Jul 20, 1921 | Mount Royal Arena, Montreal, Quebec, Canada | |
| 241 | Loss | 44–11–11 (175) | Carl E. Morris | DQ | 6 (12) | Jul 2, 1921 | Convention Hall, Tulsa, Oklahoma, U.S. | |
| 240 | Win | 44–10–11 (175) | Soldier Jones | PTS | 10 | May 30, 1921 | Exhibition Grounds, Quebec City, Quebec, Canada | |
| 239 | Win | 43–10–11 (175) | Bill Reed | PTS | 12 | Apr 29, 1921 | Arena, Syracuse, New York, U.S. | |
| 238 | Win | 42–10–11 (175) | Dan O'Dowd | PTS | 12 | Apr 15, 1921 | Arena, Syracuse, New York, U.S. | |
| 237 | Loss | 41–10–11 (175) | Charley Weinert | PTS | 15 | Mar 18, 1921 | Flatbush A.C., Brooklyn, New York City, New York, U.S. | |
| 236 | Win | 41–9–11 (175) | Homer Smith | PTS | 12 | Mar 10, 1921 | Madison Square Garden, Manhattan, New York City, New York, U.S. | |
| 235 | Loss | 40–9–11 (175) | Noel "Boy" McCormick | DQ | 7 (10) | Dec 8, 1920 | Arena, Milwaukie, Oregon, U.S. | |
| 234 | Loss | 40–8–11 (175) | Georges Carpentier | KO | 4 (12) | Oct 12, 1920 | Westside Ballpark, Jersey City, New Jersey, U.S. | Lost world light-heavyweight title; For vacant NYSAC light-heavyweight title |
| 233 | Win | 40–7–11 (175) | Sergeant Ray Smith | NWS | 10 | Jun 26, 1920 | League Park, Cleveland, Ohio, U.S. | |
| 232 | Draw | 40–7–11 (174) | Chuck Wiggins | PTS | 12 | May 21, 1920 | Westwood Field, Dayton, Ohio, U.S. | |
| 231 | Draw | 40–7–10 (174) | Jack Renault | NWS | 12 | May 5, 1920 | Lewiston, Maine, U.S. | |
| 230 | Win | 40–7–10 (173) | Clay Turner | NWS | 12 | May 3, 1920 | Exposition Building, Portland, Oregon, U.S. | |
| 229 | Win | 40–7–10 (172) | Tony Melchior | NWS | 10 | Apr 28, 1920 | Kenosha, Wisconsin, U.S. | |
| 228 | Win | 40–7–10 (171) | Silas Green | NWS | 10 | Apr 19, 1920 | Monument National, Montreal, Quebec, Canada | |
| 227 | Win | 40–7–10 (170) | Clay Turner | NWS | 10 | Mar 26, 1920 | Auditorium, Hartford, Connecticut, U.S. | |
| 226 | Win | 40–7–10 (169) | Al Benedict | NWS | 8 | Mar 22, 1920 | West Hoboken A.C., West Hoboken, New Jersey, U.S. | |
| 225 | Win | 40–7–10 (168) | Clay Turner | NWS | 10 | Feb 16, 1920 | Arena Gardens, Detroit, Michigan, U.S. | |
| 224 | Win | 40–7–10 (167) | Johnny Howard | NWS | 8 | Jan 23, 1920 | Lotus A.C., Perth Amboy, New Jersey, U.S. | |
| 223 | Win | 40–7–10 (166) | Bert Kenny | TKO | 8 (10) | Jan 1, 1920 | Arena Gardens, Toronto, Quebec, Canada | |
| 222 | Draw | 39–7–10 (166) | Clay Turner | NWS | 10 | Nov 24, 1919 | Roller Palace Rink, Detroit, Michigan, U.S. | ABA and world light-heavyweight titles at stake; (via KO only) |
| 221 | Win | 39–7–10 (165) | Bartley Madden | NWS | 10 | Nov 17, 1919 | Monument National, Montreal, Quebec, Canada | |
| 220 | Loss | 39–7–10 (164) | Harry Greb | NWS | 10 | Sep 3, 1919 | State Fair Grounds, Wheeling, West Virginia, U.S. | ABA and world light-heavyweight titles at stake; (via KO only) |
| 219 | Win | 39–7–10 (163) | Clay Turner | NWS | 8 | Aug 11, 1919 | Open-Air Arena, Jersey City, New Jersey, U.S. | |
| 218 | Win | 39–7–10 (162) | Jim Tulle | KO | 1 (10) | Aug 9, 1919 | Tully Coliseum, Saratoga Springs, New York, U.S. | |
| 217 | Win | 38–7–10 (162) | Ed Kinley | NWS | 8 | Jul 25, 1919 | DeForest Gymnasium, Long Branch, New Jersey, U.S. | |
| 216 | Loss | 38–7–10 (161) | Harry Greb | NWS | 6 | Jul 14, 1919 | Shibe Park, Philadelphia, Pennsylvania, U.S. | |
| 215 | Win | 38–7–10 (160) | Billy Miske | NWS | 12 | Jul 3, 1919 | Rossford Arena, Rossford, Ohio, U.S. | ABA and world light-heavyweight titles at stake; (via KO only) |
| 214 | Draw | 38–7–10 (159) | Tim Logan | NWS | 6 | May 20, 1919 | Armory, Chester, Pennsylvania, U.S. | |
| 213 | Loss | 38–7–10 (158) | Johnny Howard | NWS | 8 | May 2, 1919 | Bayonne Pavillion, Bayonne, New Jersey, U.S. | |
| 212 | Loss | 38–7–10 (157) | Harry Greb | NWS | 12 | Apr 28, 1919 | Canton Auditorium, Canton, Ohio, U.S. | |
| 211 | Win | 38–7–10 (156) | Ed Kinley | NWS | 8 | Apr 14, 1919 | McGuigan's Arena, Harrison, New Jersey, U.S. | |
| 210 | Loss | 38–7–10 (155) | Harry Greb | NWS | 10 | Feb 17, 1919 | Broadway Auditorium, Buffalo, New York, U.S. | ABA and world light-heavyweight titles at stake; (via KO only) |
| 209 | Win | 38–7–10 (154) | Jim Coffey | PTS | 12 | Feb 12, 1919 | Arena, Boston, Massachusetts, U.S. | |
| 208 | Win | 37–7–10 (154) | Leo Houck | NWS | 6 | Dec 25, 1918 | Frank Erne Club, Lancaster, Pennsylvania, U.S. | |
| 207 | Loss | 37–7–10 (153) | Jack Dempsey | KO | 3 (6) | Nov 6, 1918 | Olympia A.C., Philadelphia, Pennsylvania, U.S. | |
| 206 | Win | 37–6–10 (153) | Clay Turner | NWS | 8 | Aug 26, 1918 | Jersey City, New Jersey, U.S. | |
| 205 | Loss | 37–6–10 (152) | Harry Greb | NWS | 6 | Aug 6, 1918 | Shibe Park, Philadelphia, Pennsylvania, U.S. | |
| 204 | Loss | 37–6–10 (151) | Bartley Madden | NWS | 8 | Jul 20, 1918 | Atlantic City A.C., Atlantic City, New Jersey, U.S. | |
| 203 | Win | 37–6–10 (150) | Charley Weinert | NWS | 8 | Jun 17, 1918 | Open-Air Arena, Jersey City, New Jersey, U.S. | |
| 202 | Win | 37–6–10 (149) | Jim Coffey | NWS | 6 | Jun 6, 1918 | Broadway Auditorium, Buffalo, New York, U.S. | |
| 201 | Win | 37–6–10 (148) | Bartley Madden | NWS | 15 | May 27, 1918 | Casino Hall, Bridgeport, Connecticut, U.S. | |
| 200 | Draw | 37–6–10 (147) | Bill Brennan | PTS | 12 | Jan 15, 1918 | Grand Opera House, Boston, Massachusetts, U.S. | |
| 199 | Draw | 37–6–9 (147) | Bartley Madden | PTS | 12 | Dec 11, 1917 | Grand Opera House, Boston, Massachusetts, U.S. | |
| 198 | Win | 37–6–8 (147) | Bill Brennan | PTS | 12 | Nov 27, 1917 | Arena, Boston, Massachusetts, U.S. | |
| 197 | Win | 36–6–8 (147) | Zulu Kid | NWS | 10 | Oct 31, 1917 | Sohmer Park, Montreal, Quebec, Canada | |
| 196 | Loss | 36–6–8 (146) | Bill Brennan | PTS | 12 | Oct 23, 1917 | Arena (Armory A.A.), Boston, Massachusetts, U.S. | |
| 195 | Win | 36–5–8 (146) | Tom McMahon | PTS | 12 | Oct 15, 1917 | Winnipeg, Manitoba, Canada | |
| 194 | Draw | 35–5–8 (146) | Bill Brennan | PTS | 12 | Oct 2, 1917 | Arena (Armory A.A.), Boston, Massachusetts, U.S. | |
| 193 | Draw | 35–5–7 (146) | Jim Coffey | PTS | 12 | Sep 11, 1917 | Arena, Boston, Massachusetts, U.S. | |
| 192 | Loss | 35–5–6 (146) | Harry Greb | NWS | 10 | Sep 6, 1917 | Forbes Field, Pittsburgh, Pennsylvania, U.S. | |
| 191 | Win | 35–5–6 (145) | Jack London | TKO | 4 (10) | Aug 6, 1917 | Military A.C., Brooklyn, New York City, New York, U.S. | |
| 190 | Win | 34–5–6 (145) | Al Benedict | NWS | 10 | Jul 16, 1917 | Military A.C., Brooklyn, New York City, New York, U.S. | |
| 189 | Win | 34–5–6 (144) | Al Benedict | NWS | 10 | Jun 25, 1917 | Military A.C., Brooklyn, New York City, New York, U.S. | |
| 188 | Win | 34–5–6 (143) | Johnny Howard | PTS | 12 | Jun 20, 1917 | Marieville Gardens, North Providence, Rhode Island, U.S. | Retained ABA and NYSAC light-heavyweight titles |
| 187 | Win | 33–5–6 (143) | Bartley Madden | NWS | 10 | Jun 15, 1917 | Brown's Gym A.A., Far Rockaway, Queens, New York City, New York, U.S. | |
| 186 | Win | 33–5–6 (142) | Bert Kenny | NWS | 10 | May 26, 1917 | Fairmont A.C., Bronx, New York City, New York, U.S. | |
| 185 | Win | 33–5–6 (141) | Leo Houck | NWS | 6 | May 16, 1917 | York Opera House, York, Pennsylvania, U.S. | |
| 184 | Draw | 33–5–6 (140) | Bob McAllister | NWS | 10 | May 9, 1917 | Fairmont A.C., Bronx, New York City, New York, U.S. | |
| 183 | Loss | 33–5–6 (139) | Tommy Gibbons | NWS | 10 | Mar 23, 1917 | Auditorium, Saint Paul, Minnesota, U.S. | ABA and NYSAC light-heavyweight titles at stake; (via KO only) |
| 182 | Win | 33–5–6 (138) | Jack Moran | PTS | 12 | Mar 6, 1917 | Coliseum, Saint Louis, Missouri, U.S. | |
| 181 | Win | 32–5–6 (138) | Billy Miske | NWS | 10 | Feb 27, 1917 | Auditorium, Saint Paul, Minnesota, U.S. | ABA and NYSAC light-heavyweight titles at stake; (via KO only) |
| 180 | Win | 32–5–6 (137) | Bob Moha | NWS | 12 | Jan 17, 1917 | Grand Opera House, Youngstown, Ohio, U.S. | |
| 179 | Win | 32–5–6 (136) | Jim Smith | NWS | 10 | Jan 12, 1917 | Village A.C., Manhattan, New York City, New York, U.S. | |
| 178 | Win | 32–5–6 (135) | Gunboat Smith | NWS | 10 | Jan 1, 1917 | Clermont Avenue Rink, Brooklyn, New York City, New York, U.S. | |
| 177 | Draw | 32–5–6 (134) | Gus Christie | PTS | 15 | Dec 8, 1916 | Gymnastic Club, Dayton, Ohio, U.S. | |
| 176 | Loss | 32–5–5 (134) | Carl E. Morris | PTS | 15 | Nov 16, 1916 | Convention Hall, Kansas City, Missouri, U.S. | |
| 175 | Loss | 32–4–5 (134) | Billy Miske | NWS | 10 | Oct 30, 1916 | Clermont Avenue Rink, Brooklyn, New York City, New York, U.S. | |
| 174 | Win | 32–4–5 (133) | Jack Dillon | PTS | 12 | Oct 24, 1916 | Arena, Boston, Massachusetts, U.S. | Won ABA and NYSAC light-heavyweight titles |
| 173 | Loss | 31–4–5 (133) | Billy Miske | NWS | 10 | Oct 12, 1916 | Clermont Avenue Rink, Brooklyn, New York City, New York, U.S. | |
| 172 | Win | 31–4–5 (132) | Gunboat Smith | PTS | 12 | Oct 10, 1916 | Arena (Armory A.A.), Boston, Massachusetts, U.S. | |
| 171 | Draw | 30–4–5 (132) | Gus Christie | PTS | 8 | Oct 3, 1916 | Phoenix A.C., Memphis, Tennessee, U.S. | |
| 170 | Win | 30–4–4 (132) | Battling Brandt | NWS | 12 | Sep 26, 1916 | Olympic Coliseum, Columbus, Ohio, U.S. | |
| 169 | Draw | 30–4–4 (131) | Jack Dillon | NWS | 8 | Sep 12, 1916 | Phoenix A.C., Memphis, Tennessee, U.S. | ABA and NYSAC light-heavyweight titles at stake; (via KO only) |
| 168 | Win | 30–4–4 (130) | George K.O. Brown | NWS | 10 | Sep 4, 1916 | East Chicago, Indiana, U.S. | |
| 167 | Win | 30–4–4 (129) | Tommy Burke | PTS | 12 | Jul 25, 1916 | Coliseum, Saint Louis, Missouri, U.S. | |
| 166 | Win | 29–4–4 (129) | George Ashe | NWS | 10 | Jul 21, 1916 | Brown's Gym A.A., Far Rockaway, Queens, New York City, New York, U.S. | |
| 165 | Win | 29–4–4 (128) | Jack Dillon | NWS | 10 | Jul 13, 1916 | Oriole Park, Baltimore, Maryland, U.S. | |
| 164 | Win | 29–4–4 (127) | Jim Barry | NWS | 10 | Jun 30, 1916 | Arena, Syracuse, New York, U.S. | |
| 163 | Draw | 29–4–4 (126) | Porky Dan Flynn | PTS | 8 | May 30, 1916 | Rose A.C., Chattanooga, Tennessee, U.S. | |
| 162 | Win | 29–4–3 (126) | Gunboat Smith | NWS | 6 | May 15, 1916 | Olympia A.C., Philadelphia, Pennsylvania, U.S. | |
| 161 | Loss | 29–4–3 (125) | Jack Dillon | PTS | 15 | Apr 25, 1916 | Convention Hall, Kansas City, Missouri, U.S. | For ABA and NYSAC light-heavyweight titles |
| 160 | Win | 29–3–3 (125) | Mike Fitzgerald | KO | 2 (10) | Apr 19, 1916 | Arena, Toronto, Quebec, Canada | |
| 159 | Loss | 28–3–3 (125) | Jack Dillon | NWS | 10 | Mar 28, 1916 | Broadway Arena, Brooklyn, New York City, New York, U.S. | |
| 158 | Win | 28–3–3 (124) | Jim Savage | TKO | 6 (10) | Mar 25, 1916 | Madison Square Garden, Manhattan, New York City, New York, U.S. | |
| 157 | Win | 27–3–3 (124) | Jack Keating | NWS | 10 | Mar 20, 1916 | Hudson Theatre, Schenectady, Pennsylvania, U.S. | |
| 156 | Win | 27–3–3 (123) | Bob Devere | NWS | 10 | Mar 17, 1916 | Arena, Syracuse, New York, U.S. | |
| 155 | Win | 27–3–3 (122) | Jack Connors | NWS | 10 | Mar 14, 1916 | Hillside Casino, Yonkers, New York, U.S. | |
| 154 | Win | 27–3–3 (121) | Sailor Jack Carroll | NWS | 10 | Mar 9, 1916 | Greenwood A.C., New London, Connecticut, U.S. | |
| 153 | Win | 27–3–3 (120) | Bert Kenny | NWS | 10 | Mar 7, 1916 | Park Theatre, Bridgeport, Connecticut, U.S. | |
| 152 | Win | 27–3–3 (119) | Jack Hanlon | TKO | 3 (10) | Mar 3, 1916 | East New York A.C., Brooklyn, New York City, New York, U.S. | |
| 151 | Win | 26–3–3 (119) | Jack Driscoll | TKO | 3 (10) | Feb 28, 1916 | Long Acre A.C., Manhattan, New York City, New York, U.S. | |
| 150 | Loss | 25–3–3 (119) | Jack Dillon | NWS | 10 | Feb 8, 1916 | Broadway Arena, Brooklyn, New York City, New York, U.S. | |
| 149 | Win | 25–3–3 (118) | Zulu Kid | NWS | 10 | Jan 28, 1916 | Long Acre A.C., Manhattan, New York City, New York, U.S. | |
| 148 | Win | 25–3–3 (117) | Al Reich | PTS | 12 | Jan 25, 1916 | Hippodrome, Boston, Massachusetts, U.S. | |
| 147 | Win | 24–3–3 (117) | Silas Green | NWS | 10 | Jan 21, 1916 | Canadian A.C., Montreal, Quebec, Canada | |
| 146 | Win | 24–3–3 (116) | Tom Cowler | PTS | 12 | Jan 11, 1916 | Hippodrome, Boston, Massachusetts, U.S. | |
| 145 | Win | 23–3–3 (116) | Tom McMahon | NWS | 10 | Jan 1, 1916 | Town Hall, Scranton, Pennsylvania, U.S. | |
| 144 | Win | 23–3–3 (115) | Fireman Jim Flynn | NWS | 10 | Dec 25, 1915 | Broadway S.C., Brooklyn, New York City, New York, U.S. | |
| 143 | Win | 23–3–3 (114) | Jack Connors | NWS | 10 | Dec 20, 1915 | Olympic A.C., Manhattan, New York City, New York, U.S. | |
| 142 | Win | 23–3–3 (113) | Porky Dan Flynn | NWS | 10 | Nov 26, 1915 | Harlem S.C., Manhattan, New York City, New York, U.S. | |
| 141 | Win | 23–3–3 (112) | Tom Cowler | NWS | 10 | Nov 15, 1915 | Olympia Boxing Club, Manhattan, New York City, New York, U.S. | |
| 140 | Win | 23–3–3 (111) | Tom McCarty | NWS | 10 | Nov 13, 1915 | Broadway S.C., Brooklyn, New York City, New York, U.S. | |
| 139 | Win | 23–3–3 (110) | Jack Geyer | NWS | 10 | Nov 8, 1915 | O'Hara Theatre, Shenandoah, Pennsylvania, U.S. | |
| 138 | Draw | 23–3–3 (109) | Porky Dan Flynn | NWS | 6 | Oct 25, 1915 | Exposition Building, Portland, Oregon, U.S. | |
| 137 | Win | 23–3–3 (108) | Soldier Kearns | NWS | 10 | Sep 28, 1915 | Clermont Avenue Rink, Brooklyn, New York City, New York, U.S. | |
| 136 | Win | 23–3–3 (107) | Sandy Ferguson | PTS | 12 | Sep 14, 1915 | Atlas A.A., Boston, Massachusetts, U.S. | |
| 135 | Win | 22–3–3 (107) | Soldier Kearns | NWS | 10 | Aug 28, 1915 | Broadway S.C., Brooklyn, New York City, New York, U.S. | |
| 134 | Win | 22–3–3 (106) | Sailor Jack Carroll | NWS | 10 | Aug 14, 1915 | Broadway S.C., Brooklyn, New York City, New York, U.S. | |
| 133 | Win | 22–3–3 (105) | Colin Bell | NWS | 10 | Aug 6, 1915 | Brown's Gym A.A., Far Rockaway, Queens, New York City, New York, U.S. | |
| 132 | Win | 22–3–3 (104) | Joe Rosen | NWS | 6 | Jul 13, 1915 | Douglas A.C., Philadelphia, Pennsylvania, U.S. | |
| 131 | Win | 22–3–3 (103) | Porky Dan Flynn | NWS | 10 | Jul 9, 1915 | Brown's Gym A.A., Far Rockaway, Queens, New York City, New York, U.S. | |
| 130 | Win | 22–3–3 (102) | K.O. Sullivan | NWS | 10 | Jul 2, 1915 | O'Hara Theatre, Shenandoah, Pennsylvania, U.S. | |
| 129 | Win | 22–3–3 (101) | Porky Dan Flynn | NWS | 10 | May 31, 1915 | Ebbets Field, Brooklyn, New York City, New York, U.S. | |
| 128 | Win | 22–3–3 (100) | George Ashe | NWS | 10 | May 28, 1915 | Brown's Gym A.A., Far Rockaway, Queens, New York City, New York, U.S. | |
| 127 | Win | 22–3–3 (99) | Jack Connors | NWS | 10 | May 14, 1915 | Vanderbilt A.C., Brooklyn, New York City, New York, U.S. | |
| 126 | Win | 22–3–3 (98) | Zulu Kid | NWS | 10 | Apr 3, 1915 | Federal A.C., Manhattan, New York City, New York, U.S. | |
| 125 | Win | 22–3–3 (97) | Tom McCarty | NWS | 10 | Mar 27, 1915 | Broadway S.C., Brooklyn, New York City, New York, U.S. | |
| 124 | Win | 22–3–3 (96) | Jack Hanlon | NWS | 10 | Mar 23, 1915 | Astoria S C, Astoria, New York, U.S. | |
| 123 | Win | 22–3–3 (95) | Billy Ketchell | NWS | 10 | Mar 19, 1915 | 135th Street A.C., Manhattan, New York City, New York, U.S. | |
| 122 | Win | 22–3–3 (94) | George Ashe | NWS | 6 | Mar 8, 1915 | Olympia A.C., Philadelphia, Pennsylvania, U.S. | |
| 121 | Draw | 22–3–3 (93) | Sailor Fred Fritts | NWS | 10 | Mar 6, 1915 | Irving A.C., Brooklyn, New York City, New York, U.S. | |
| 120 | Loss | 22–3–3 (92) | Gunboat Smith | PTS | 20 | Jan 27, 1915 | Greenwall Theater, New Orleans, Louisiana, U.S. | |
| 119 | Win | 22–2–3 (92) | Jack Keating | NWS | 10 | Jan 6, 1915 | Federal A.C., Manhattan, New York City, New York, U.S. | |
| 118 | Draw | 22–2–3 (91) | Gunboat Smith | PTS | 12 | Jan 1, 1915 | Auditorium, Waterbury, Connecticut, U.S. | |
| 117 | Draw | 22–2–2 (91) | Porky Dan Flynn | NWS | 10 | Dec 25, 1914 | Broadway S.C., Brooklyn, New York City, New York, U.S. | |
| 116 | Loss | 22–2–2 (90) | Tom McCarty | NWS | 10 | Nov 26, 1914 | Irving A.C., Brooklyn, New York City, New York, U.S. | |
| 115 | Win | 22–2–2 (89) | Zulu Kid | NWS | 10 | Nov 21, 1914 | Irving A.C., Brooklyn, New York City, New York, U.S. | Not to be confused with Young Zulu Kid |
| 114 | Draw | 22–2–2 (88) | Frank Mantell | PTS | 12 | Nov 5, 1914 | Rhode Island A.C., Providence, Rhode Island, U.S. | |
| 113 | Win | 22–2–1 (88) | Terry Kellar | NWS | 10 | Oct 31, 1914 | Fairmont A.C., Bronx, New York City, New York, U.S. | |
| 112 | Win | 22–2–1 (87) | Sailor Fred Fritts | NWS | 10 | Oct 30, 1914 | Empire A.C., Manhattan, New York City, New York, U.S. | |
| 111 | Win | 22–2–1 (86) | Fireman Jim Flynn | NWS | 10 | Oct 20, 1914 | Broadway S.C., Brooklyn, New York City, New York, U.S. | |
| 110 | Win | 22–2–1 (85) | Gunboat Smith | NWS | 10 | Oct 9, 1914 | Manhattan Casino, Manhattan, New York City, New York, U.S. | |
| 109 | Loss | 22–2–1 (84) | George Davis | NWS | 10 | Sep 18, 1914 | Broadway Auditorium, Buffalo, New York, U.S. | |
| 108 | Win | 22–2–1 (83) | Jack Nevins | KO | 2 (10) | Aug 31, 1914 | Brown's Gym A.A., Far Rockaway, Queens, New York City, New York, U.S. | |
| 107 | Win | 21–2–1 (83) | Bartley Madden | NWS | 10 | Aug 19, 1914 | St. Nicholas Arena, Manhattan, New York City, New York, U.S. | |
| 106 | Draw | 21–2–1 (82) | Sailor Fred Fritts | NWS | 10 | Aug 18, 1914 | Broadway S.C., Brooklyn, New York City, New York, U.S. | |
| 105 | Win | 21–2–1 (81) | Jack Driscoll | NWS | 10 | Jul 31, 1914 | Brown's Gym A.A., Far Rockaway, Queens, New York City, New York, U.S. | |
| 104 | Win | 21–2–1 (80) | Porky Dan Flynn | NWS | 10 | Jul 21, 1914 | Broadway S.C., Brooklyn, New York City, New York, U.S. | |
| 103 | Win | 21–2–1 (79) | Charley Weinert | NWS | 10 | Jun 30, 1914 | Broadway Arena, Brooklyn, New York City, New York, U.S. | |
| 102 | Win | 21–2–1 (78) | Bert Kenny | NWS | 10 | Jun 26, 1914 | Brown's Gym A.A., Far Rockaway, Queens, New York City, New York, U.S. | |
| 101 | Win | 21–2–1 (77) | Jack Davies | KO | 7 (10) | Jun 6, 1914 | Fairmont A.C., Bronx, New York City, New York, U.S. | |
| 100 | Loss | 20–2–1 (77) | Jack Dillon | NWS | 10 | May 29, 1914 | Federal Park, Indianapolis, Indiana, U.S. | World light-heavyweight title at stake; (via KO only) |
| 99 | Win | 20–2–1 (76) | Carl Lewis | NWS | 10 | May 19, 1914 | Broadway S.C., Brooklyn, New York City, New York, U.S. | |
| 98 | Loss | 20–2–1 (75) | Jack Dillon | PTS | 12 | Apr 14, 1914 | Holland Arena, Butte, Montana, U.S. | Dillon claimed vacant world light-heavyweight title |
| 97 | Loss | 20–1–1 (75) | Bob Moha | NWS | 10 | Mar 23, 1914 | Southside A.A., Milwaukee, Wisconsin, U.S. | |
| 96 | Win | 20–1–1 (74) | Sailor Fred Fritts | NWS | 10 | Mar 17, 1914 | Broadway S.C., Brooklyn, New York City, New York, U.S. | |
| 95 | Win | 20–1–1 (73) | Tim O'Neil | NWS | 6 | Mar 14, 1914 | National A.C., Philadelphia, Pennsylvania, U.S. | |
| 94 | Win | 20–1–1 (72) | Jim Coffey | NWS | 10 | Mar 9, 1914 | Madison Square Garden, Manhattan, New York City, New York, U.S. | |
| 93 | Win | 20–1–1 (71) | Jack Keating | NWS | 10 | Mar 7, 1914 | Broadway S.C., Brooklyn, New York City, New York, U.S. | |
| 92 | Win | 20–1–1 (70) | Fred McKay | NWS | 10 | Mar 3, 1914 | Broadway S.C., Brooklyn, New York City, New York, U.S. | |
| 91 | Win | 20–1–1 (69) | Tom McMahon | NWS | 10 | Feb 6, 1914 | Empire A.C., New Star Casino, Manhattan, New York City, New York, U.S. | |
| 90 | Win | 20–1–1 (68) | Tony Ross | NWS | 6 | Jan 31, 1914 | National A.C., Philadelphia, Pennsylvania, U.S. | |
| 89 | Win | 20–1–1 (67) | Soldier Kearns | NWS | 10 | Jan 27, 1914 | Atlantic Garden A.C., Manhattan, New York City, New York, U.S. | |
| 88 | Win | 20–1–1 (66) | Bob Kenny | TKO | 3 (10) | Jan 22, 1914 | Allentown, Pennsylvania, U.S. | |
| 87 | Win | 19–1–1 (66) | Jack Keating | NWS | 10 | Jan 20, 1914 | Liberty A.C., Bridgeport, Connecticut, U.S. | |
| 86 | Win | 19–1–1 (65) | Jack Connors | NWS | 10 | Jan 19, 1914 | Sharkey A.C., Manhattan, New York City, New York, U.S. | |
| 85 | Win | 19–1–1 (64) | Porky Dan Flynn | NWS | 10 | Jan 13, 1914 | National S.C., Manhattan, New York City, New York, U.S. | |
| 84 | Loss | 19–1–1 (63) | Bob McAllister | NWS | 10 | Jan 5, 1914 | Madison Square Garden, Manhattan, New York City, New York, U.S. | |
| 83 | Win | 19–1–1 (62) | Jim Coffey | NWS | 6 | Jan 3, 1914 | National A.C., Philadelphia, Pennsylvania, U.S. | |
| 82 | Win | 19–1–1 (61) | Tommy Daly | KO | 2 (10) | Jan 1, 1914 | Atlantic Garden A.C., Manhattan, New York City, New York, U.S. | |
| 81 | Win | 18–1–1 (61) | Jack Driscoll | NWS | 10 | Dec 25, 1913 | Irving A.C., Brooklyn, New York City, New York, U.S. | |
| 80 | Win | 18–1–1 (60) | Jim Coffey | NWS | 10 | Dec 22, 1913 | Madison Square Garden, Manhattan, New York City, New York, U.S. | |
| 79 | Win | 18–1–1 (59) | Fireman Jim Flynn | NWS | 10 | Dec 9, 1913 | Atlantic Garden A.C., Manhattan, New York City, New York, U.S. | |
| 78 | Draw | 18–1–1 (58) | Charley Weinert | NWS | 10 | Dec 2, 1913 | Brown's Gym, Manhattan, New York City, New York, U.S. | |
| 77 | Win | 18–1–1 (57) | Yankee Gilbert | TKO | 4 (10) | Nov 24, 1913 | Olympic A.C., Manhattan, New York City, New York, U.S. | |
| 76 | Win | 17–1–1 (57) | Ed Hagen | KO | 7 (10) | Nov 20, 1913 | Atlantic Garden A.C., Manhattan, New York City, New York, U.S. | |
| 75 | Win | 16–1–1 (57) | Tim Logan | NWS | 10 | Nov 18, 1913 | Brown's Gym, Manhattan, New York City, New York, U.S. | |
| 74 | Win | 16–1–1 (56) | Soldier Bachus | KO | 9 (10) | Nov 15, 1913 | Sharkey A.C., Manhattan, New York City, New York, U.S. | |
| 73 | Win | 15–1–1 (56) | Jack Keating | NWS | 10 | Sep 30, 1913 | Atlantic Garden A.C., Manhattan, New York City, New York, U.S. | |
| 72 | Win | 15–1–1 (55) | Jack "Twin" Sullivan | NWS | 10 | Sep 27, 1913 | Irving A.C., Brooklyn, New York City, New York, U.S. | |
| 71 | Win | 15–1–1 (54) | Frank McGuinness | KO | 6 (10) | Sep 23, 1913 | Atlantic Garden A.C., Manhattan, New York City, New York, U.S. | |
| 70 | Win | 14–1–1 (54) | Whitey Allen | TKO | 3 (10) | Sep 17, 1913 | St. Nicholas Arena, Manhattan, New York City, New York, U.S. | |
| 69 | Loss | 13–1–1 (54) | Eddie McGoorty | NWS | 10 | Sep 10, 1913 | St. Nicholas Arena, Manhattan, New York City, New York, U.S. | |
| 68 | Win | 13–1–1 (53) | Nick Muller | TKO | 6 (10) | Aug 27, 1913 | St. Nicholas Arena, Manhattan, New York City, New York, U.S. | |
| 67 | Win | 12–1–1 (53) | Sailor White | NWS | 10 | Aug 19, 1913 | Atlantic A.A., Rockaway Beach, Queens, New York City, New York, U.S. | |
| 66 | Win | 12–1–1 (52) | Tim Logan | NWS | 10 | Aug 13, 1913 | St. Nicholas Arena, Manhattan, New York City, New York, U.S. | |
| 65 | Draw | 12–1–1 (51) | Porky Dan Flynn | NWS | 10 | Jul 30, 1913 | St. Nicholas Arena, Manhattan, New York City, New York, U.S. | |
| 64 | Loss | 12–1–1 (50) | Jack "Twin" Sullivan | NWS | 10 | Jul 3, 1913 | Broadway Auditorium, Buffalo, New York, U.S. | |
| 63 | Draw | 12–1–1 (49) | Jack Dillon | NWS | 10 | Apr 17, 1913 | Rochester, New York, U.S. | |
| 62 | Draw | 12–1–1 (48) | George Davis | NWS | 10 | Mar 7, 1913 | Broadway Auditorium, Buffalo, New York, U.S. | |
| 61 | Win | 12–1–1 (47) | Tom McMahon | NWS | 10 | Feb 10, 1913 | Broadway Auditorium, Buffalo, New York, U.S. | |
| 60 | Win | 12–1–1 (46) | Dick Gilbert | PTS | 25 | Dec 20, 1912 | Jacksonville, Florida, U.S. | |
| 59 | Win | 11–1–1 (46) | Tom Kennedy | NWS | 6 | Nov 28, 1912 | Olympia A.C., Philadelphia, Pennsylvania, U.S. | |
| 58 | Win | 11–1–1 (45) | Harry Ramsey | NWS | 6 | Nov 12, 1912 | Spring Garden A.C., Philadelphia, Pennsylvania, U.S. | |
| 57 | Win | 11–1–1 (44) | Eddie McGoorty | NWS | 6 | Sep 28, 1912 | National A.C., Philadelphia, Pennsylvania, U.S. | |
| 56 | Loss | 11–1–1 (43) | Dave Smith | NWS | 6 | Sep 21, 1912 | National A.C., Philadelphia, Pennsylvania, U.S. | |
| 55 | Win | 11–1–1 (42) | Emmett "Kid" Wagner | NWS | 6 | Sep 7, 1912 | National A.C., Philadelphia, Pennsylvania, U.S. | |
| 54 | Win | 11–1–1 (41) | Harry Wuest | NWS | 15 | Jul 19, 1912 | Jacksonville, Florida, U.S. | |
| 53 | Win | 11–1–1 (40) | Dick Gilbert | PTS | 20 | Jun 14, 1912 | Jacksonville, Florida, U.S. | |
| 52 | Win | 10–1–1 (40) | Dick Gilbert | PTS | 15 | Jun 7, 1912 | Jacksonville, Florida, U.S. | |
| 51 | Win | 9–1–1 (40) | Dick Gilbert | PTS | 15 | May 24, 1912 | Jacksonville, Florida, U.S. | |
| 50 | Win | 8–1–1 (40) | Emmett "Kid" Wagner | NWS | 10 | May 17, 1912 | Luzerne Theater, Wilkes-Barre, Pennsylvania, U.S. | |
| 49 | Win | 8–1–1 (39) | Eddie Palmer | NWS | 10 | May 3, 1912 | Wilkes-Barre, Pennsylvania, U.S. | |
| 48 | Draw | 8–1–1 (38) | Tony Caponi | PTS | 10 | Apr 16, 1912 | Gate City A.C., Atlanta, Georgia, U.S. | |
| 47 | Win | 8–1 (38) | Larry Williams | NWS | 6 | Apr 4, 1912 | Broadway A.C., Philadelphia, Pennsylvania, U.S. | |
| 46 | Win | 8–1 (37) | Peck Miller | PTS | 10 | Mar 21, 1912 | Keystone A.C., Allentown, Pennsylvania, U.S. | |
| 45 | Draw | 7–1 (37) | Bill MacKinnon | NWS | 10 | Mar 19, 1912 | Brown's Gym, Manhattan, New York City, New York, U.S. | |
| 44 | Draw | 7–1 (36) | Eddie Palmer | NWS | 6 | Mar 12, 1912 | Douglas A.C., Philadelphia, Pennsylvania, U.S. | |
| 43 | Loss | 7–1 (35) | Eddie McGoorty | NWS | 6 | Feb 12, 1912 | Old City Hall, Pittsburgh, Pennsylvania, U.S. | |
| 42 | Win | 7–1 (34) | George Ashe | TKO | 13 (15) | Feb 8, 1912 | Monumental Theater, Baltimore, Maryland, U.S. | |
| 41 | Draw | 6–1 (34) | George Ashe | NWS | 6 | Jan 18, 1912 | Broadway A.C., Philadelphia, Pennsylvania, U.S. | |
| 40 | Win | 6–1 (33) | Joe Grim | NWS | 6 | Jan 11, 1912 | Broadway A.C., Philadelphia, Pennsylvania, U.S. | |
| 39 | Loss | 6–1 (32) | Jeff Clark | NWS | 15 | Dec 27, 1911 | Southwest A.C., Joplin, Missouri, U.S. | |
| 38 | Loss | 6–1 (31) | Jeff Clark | NWS | 15 | Dec 14, 1911 | Joplin, Missouri, U.S. | |
| 37 | Loss | 6–1 (30) | Leo Houck | PTS | 12 | Oct 24, 1911 | Arena (Armory A.A.), Boston, Massachusetts, U.S. | |
| 36 | Loss | 6–0 (30) | Jack Dillon | NWS | 6 | Oct 23, 1911 | American A.C., Philadelphia, Pennsylvania, U.S. | |
| 35 | Draw | 6–0 (29) | Jim Barry | NWS | 6 | Oct 2, 1911 | American A.C., Philadelphia, Pennsylvania, U.S. | |
| 34 | Win | 6–0 (28) | Jumbo Wells | NWS | 6 | Sep 18, 1911 | American A.C., Philadelphia, Pennsylvania, U.S. | |
| 33 | Draw | 6–0 (27) | Jack Mitchell | NWS | 10 | Aug 12, 1911 | Tamaqua AC., Tamaqua, Pennsylvania, U.S. | |
| 32 | Win | 6–0 (26) | Billy West | NWS | 10 | Aug 8, 1911 | Brown's Gym A.A., Far Rockaway, Queens, New York City, New York, U.S. | |
| 31 | Loss | 6–0 (25) | Frank Mantell | NWS | 10 | Jul 11, 1911 | Brown's Gym, Manhattan, New York City, New York, U.S. | |
| 30 | Win | 6–0 (24) | Ralph Calloway | NWS | 10 | Jun 26, 1911 | Lark Street Auditorium, Albany, New York, U.S. | |
| 29 | Win | 6–0 (23) | Al Kubiak | NWS | 6 | May 23, 1911 | Douglas A.C., Philadelphia, Pennsylvania, U.S. | |
| 28 | Draw | 6–0 (22) | Mike Glover | NWS | 6 | Apr 3, 1911 | American A.C., Philadelphia, Pennsylvania, U.S. | |
| 27 | Draw | 6–0 (21) | Tom McMahon | NWS | 6 | Mar 25, 1911 | National A.C., Philadelphia, Pennsylvania, U.S. | |
| 26 | Loss | 6–0 (20) | Leo Houck | NWS | 6 | Mar 16, 1911 | Lancaster, Pennsylvania, U.S. | |
| 25 | Loss | 6–0 (19) | Leo Houck | NWS | 6 | Feb 2, 1911 | Lancaster, Pennsylvania, U.S. | |
| 24 | Draw | 6–0 (18) | Mike Glover | NWS | 6 | Jan 28, 1911 | American A.C., Philadelphia, Pennsylvania, U.S. | |
| 23 | Win | 6–0 (17) | Jack Doyle | NWS | 6 | Jan 24, 1911 | Douglas A.C., Philadelphia, Pennsylvania, U.S. | |
| 22 | Win | 6–0 (16) | Jimmy Howard | NWS | 6 | Jan 7, 1911 | National A.C., Philadelphia, Pennsylvania, U.S. | |
| 21 | Win | 6–0 (15) | Jack Fitzgerald | NWS | 6 | Jan 2, 1911 | American A.C., Philadelphia, Pennsylvania, U.S. | |
| 20 | Win | 6–0 (14) | Young Tommy Coleman | NWS | 6 | Dec 23, 1910 | National A.C., Philadelphia, Pennsylvania, U.S. | |
| 19 | Win | 6–0 (13) | Jackie Clark | NWS | 6 | Dec 17, 1910 | National A.C., Philadelphia, Pennsylvania, U.S. | |
| 18 | Draw | 6–0 (12) | Jimmy Glavin | NWS | 6 | Dec 10, 1910 | National A.C., Philadelphia, Pennsylvania, U.S. | |
| 17 | Loss | 6–0 (11) | Jack Fitzgerald | NWS | 6 | Dec 5, 1910 | West End A.C., Philadelphia, Pennsylvania, U.S. | |
| 16 | Win | 6–0 (10) | Mickey McDonough | NWS | 6 | Nov 24, 1910 | Nonpareil A.C., Philadelphia, Pennsylvania, U.S. | |
| 15 | Win | 6–0 (9) | Billy Burke | NWS | 6 | Oct 25, 1910 | Douglas A.C., Philadelphia, Pennsylvania, U.S. | |
| 14 | Win | 6–0 (8) | Jack Ferry | KO | 1 (6) | Oct 11, 1910 | Douglas A.C., Philadelphia, Pennsylvania, U.S. | |
| 13 | Loss | 5–0 (8) | Peck Miller | NWS | 6 | Oct 1, 1910 | National A.C., Philadelphia, Pennsylvania, U.S. | |
| 12 | Win | 5–0 (7) | Jack Doyle | NWS | 6 | Sep 17, 1910 | National A.C., Philadelphia, Pennsylvania, U.S. | |
| 11 | Win | 5–0 (6) | Johnny Dugan | TKO | 3 (6) | Sep 6, 1910 | Douglas A.C., Philadelphia, Pennsylvania, U.S. | |
| 10 | Win | 4–0 (6) | Joe Page | NWS | 6 | Aug 30, 1910 | Douglas A.C., Philadelphia, Pennsylvania, U.S. | |
| 9 | Win | 4–0 (5) | Farmer Harris | NWS | 6 | Aug 16, 1910 | Douglas A.C., Philadelphia, Pennsylvania, U.S. | |
| 8 | Win | 4–0 (4) | Al Fox | TKO | 3 (6) | Jun 27, 1910 | West End A.C., Philadelphia, Pennsylvania, U.S. | |
| 7 | Loss | 3–0 (4) | Kid Selb | NWS | 6 | May 2, 1910 | Willis A.C., Philadelphia, Pennsylvania, U.S. | |
| 6 | Win | 3–0 (3) | Joe O'Neill | KO | 3 (6) | Apr 26, 1910 | Douglas A.C., Philadelphia, Pennsylvania, U.S. | |
| 5 | Win | 2–0 (3) | Joe Sandy | KO | 2 (6) | Apr 19, 1910 | Douglas A.C., Philadelphia, Pennsylvania, U.S. | |
| 4 | Win | 1–0 (3) | Jimmy Dolan | NWS | 6 | Apr 4, 1910 | West End A.C., Philadelphia, Pennsylvania, U.S. | |
| 3 | Win | 1–0 (2) | Reddy Hogan | NWS | 6 | Mar 14, 1910 | Willis A.C., Philadelphia, Pennsylvania, U.S. | |
| 2 | Draw | 1–0 (1) | Lew Diamond | NWS | 6 | Mar 5, 1910 | National A.C., Philadelphia, Pennsylvania, U.S. | |
| 1 | Win | 1–0 | Matt Ryan | TKO | 1 (6) | Feb 3, 1910 | Broadway A.C., Philadelphia, Pennsylvania, U.S. | |

=== Unofficial record ===
| 289 fights | 196 wins | 55 losses |
|---|---|---|
| By knockout | 30 | 4 |
| By decision | 164 | 49 |
| By disqualification | 2 | 2 |
| Draws | 38 | |

Record with the inclusion of newspaper decisions in the win/loss/draw column.

| No. | Result | Record | Opponent | Type | Round | Date | Location | Notes |
|---|---|---|---|---|---|---|---|---|
| 289 | Win | 196–55–38 | Joe Sims | TKO | 3 (10) | Oct 21, 1930 | Broadway Arena, Brooklyn, New York City, New York, U.S. | |
| 288 | Loss | 195–55–38 | Herman Weiner | TKO | 1 (8) | Jan 15, 1929 | Armory, Hagerstown, Maryland, U.S. | |
| 287 | Loss | 195–54–38 | Otto von Porat | TKO | 5 (10) | Jan 11, 1929 | Armory, Grand Rapids, Michigan, U.S. | |
| 286 | Win | 195–53–38 | Pietro Corri | PTS | 10 | Jan 4, 1929 | Red Men's Hall, Bridgeport, Connecticut, U.S. | |
| 285 | Loss | 194–53–38 | Marty Gallagher | PTS | 12 | Dec 3, 1928 | 104th Regiment Armory, Baltimore, Maryland, U.S. | |
| 284 | Draw | 194–52–38 | Tom Toner | PTS | 8 | Nov 1, 1928 | New Broadway A.C., Philadelphia, Pennsylvania, U.S. | |
| 283 | Win | 194–52–37 | Bill Daring | PTS | 8 | Oct 19, 1928 | Grimes Battery, Portsmouth, Virginia, U.S. | |
| 282 | Win | 193–52–37 | Pietro Corri | PTS | 8 | Oct 18, 1928 | Passaic, New Jersey, U.S. | |
| 281 | Win | 192–52–37 | Herman Weiner | PTS | 8 | Sep 21, 1928 | Riverview Park, Baltimore, Maryland, U.S. | |
| 280 | Win | 191–52–37 | Billy Henderson | NWS | 6 | Sep 18, 1928 | Greenville, Maine, U.S. | |
| 279 | Loss | 190–52–37 | Tony Youkonis | UD | 10 | Aug 20, 1928 | Fair Grounds Arena, Allentown, Pennsylvania, U.S. | |
| 278 | Loss | 190–51–37 | Phil Mercurio | NWS | 10 | Jul 13, 1928 | Boardwalk Arena, Long Branch, New Jersey, U.S. | |
| 277 | Win | 190–50–37 | Chuck Wiggins | DQ | 5 (10) | Jul 4, 1928 | Memorial Stadium, Greensboro, North Carolina, U.S. | |
| 276 | Win | 189–50–37 | Tex McEwan | DQ | 4 (10) | Jul 2, 1928 | Tacoma Bowl, Dayton, Ohio, U.S. | |
| 275 | Loss | 188–50–37 | Emmett Rocco | UD | 10 | Jun 25, 1928 | Jolly Bowl, New Castle, Pennsylvania, U.S. | |
| 274 | Win | 188–49–37 | Emmett Rocco | NWS | 10 | Jun 6, 1928 | Armory, Akron, Ohio, U.S. | |
| 273 | Win | 187–49–37 | Benny Ross | PTS | 10 | May 21, 1928 | Laurel Garden, Newark, New Jersey, U.S. | |
| 272 | Win | 186–49–37 | Clem Johnson | PTS | 8 | Apr 30, 1928 | Chestnut Street Auditorium, Harrisburg, Pennsylvania, U.S. | |
| 271 | Win | 185–49–37 | Jim Sigman | PTS | 10 | Apr 23, 1928 | Saginaw, Michigan, U.S. | |
| 270 | Loss | 184–49–37 | Jack McAuliffe II | NWS | 10 | Apr 17, 1928 | Coliseum, Saint Louis, Missouri, U.S. | |
| 269 | Draw | 184–48–37 | Tiny Roebuck | NWS | 10 | Apr 11, 1928 | Convention Hall, Kansas City, Missouri, U.S. | |
| 268 | Win | 184–48–36 | James Jay Lawless | PTS | 10 | Apr 2, 1928 | Laurel Garden, Newark, New Jersey, U.S. | |
| 267 | Win | 183–48–36 | K.O. Samson | TKO | 2 (8) | Mar 26, 1928 | Waltz Dream Arena, Atlantic City, New Jersey, U.S. | |
| 266 | Loss | 182–48–36 | Jack Gagnon | PTS | 10 | Mar 9, 1928 | New Bedford, Massachusetts, U.S. | |
| 265 | Win | 182–47–36 | Earl Blue | PTS | 6 | Mar 5, 1928 | Broadway Arena, Brooklyn, New York City, New York, U.S. | |
| 264 | Win | 181–47–36 | Marcel DeRose | TKO | 2 (10) | Feb 27, 1928 | Bristol Arena, New Bedford, Massachusetts, U.S. | |
| 263 | Win | 180–47–36 | Jack Gagnon | PTS | 10 | Feb 17, 1928 | Mechanics Building, Boston, Massachusetts, U.S. | |
| 262 | Draw | 179–47–36 | Sandy Seifert | PTS | 10 | Feb 6, 1928 | Motor Square Garden, Pittsburgh, Pennsylvania, U.S. | |
| 261 | Win | 179–47–35 | Joe Lohman | PTS | 10 | Nov 28, 1927 | Arena, Philadelphia, Pennsylvania, U.S. | |
| 260 | Win | 178–47–35 | Matt Adgie | PTS | 10 | Nov 16, 1927 | 108th Field Artillery Armory, Philadelphia, Pennsylvania, U.S. | |
| 259 | Win | 177–47–35 | George Gemas | PTS | 10 | Nov 2, 1927 | 108th Field Artillery Armory, Philadelphia, Pennsylvania, U.S. | |
| 258 | Win | 176–47–35 | Willie Walker | PTS | 8 | Oct 28, 1927 | Auditorium, Norristown, Pennsylvania, U.S. | |
| 257 | Win | 175–47–35 | Teddy Jackson | KO | 4 (10) | Oct 24, 1927 | Floral Park Arena, North Bergen, New Jersey, U.S. | |
| 256 | Win | 174–47–35 | Clem Johnson | PTS | 10 | Sep 29, 1927 | Carnival Park, West Manayunk, Pennsylvania, U.S. | |
| 255 | Loss | 173–47–35 | Matt Adgie | MD | 10 | Sep 8, 1927 | Baker Bowl, Philadelphia, Pennsylvania, U.S. | |
| 254 | Loss | 173–46–35 | Cuban Bobby Brown | NWS | 8 | Aug 15, 1927 | Dog Track, Atlantic City, New Jersey, U.S. | |
| 253 | Win | 173–45–35 | Ray Neuman | PTS | 10 | Feb 7, 1927 | Arena, Philadelphia, Pennsylvania, U.S. | |
| 252 | Win | 172–45–35 | George Gemas | PTS | 8 | Jan 1, 1927 | Norristown, Pennsylvania, U.S. | |
| 251 | Loss | 171–45–35 | Jack Gagnon | PTS | 10 | Dec 23, 1926 | Crescent Rink, Lowell, Massachusetts, U.S. | |
| 250 | Win | 171–44–35 | Jimmy Moran | KO | 1 (8) | Nov 18, 1926 | Waltz Dream Arena, Atlantic City, New Jersey, U.S. | |
| 249 | Loss | 170–44–35 | Young Stribling | NWS | 10 | Nov 11, 1926 | Coliseum, Des Moines, Iowa, U.S. | |
| 248 | Win | 170–43–35 | George Gemas | PTS | 10 | Sep 13, 1926 | Carnival Park, West Manayunk, Pennsylvania, U.S. | |
| 247 | Win | 169–43–35 | Tommy Madden | KO | 1 (8) | Aug 31, 1926 | Lauer's Park, Reading, Pennsylvania, U.S. | |
| 246 | Loss | 168–43–35 | Gene Tunney | PTS | 12 | Jan 13, 1922 | Madison Square Garden, Manhattan, New York City, New York, U.S. | For vacant ABA light-heavyweight title |
| 245 | Draw | 168–42–35 | Bob Roper | PTS | 12 | Nov 24, 1921 | Broadway Auditorium, Buffalo, New York, U.S. | |
| 244 | Win | 168–42–34 | Mike McTigue | NWS | 10 | Sep 14, 1921 | Mount Royal Arena, Montreal, Quebec, Canada | |
| 243 | Win | 167–42–34 | Sergeant Ray Smith | NWS | 10 | Sep 8, 1921 | Exhibition Grounds, Quebec City, Quebec, Canada | |
| 242 | Win | 166–42–34 | Eddie Ricord | NWS | 10 | Jul 20, 1921 | Mount Royal Arena, Montreal, Quebec, Canada | |
| 241 | Loss | 165–42–34 | Carl E. Morris | DQ | 6 (12) | Jul 2, 1921 | Convention Hall, Tulsa, Oklahoma, U.S. | |
| 240 | Win | 165–41–34 | Soldier Jones | PTS | 10 | May 30, 1921 | Exhibition Grounds, Quebec City, Quebec, Canada | |
| 239 | Win | 164–41–34 | Bill Reed | PTS | 12 | Apr 29, 1921 | Arena, Syracuse, New York, U.S. | |
| 238 | Win | 163–41–34 | Dan O'Dowd | PTS | 12 | Apr 15, 1921 | Arena, Syracuse, New York, U.S. | |
| 237 | Loss | 162–41–34 | Charley Weinert | PTS | 15 | Mar 18, 1921 | Flatbush A.C., Brooklyn, New York City, New York, U.S. | |
| 236 | Win | 162–40–34 | Homer Smith | PTS | 12 | Mar 10, 1921 | Madison Square Garden, Manhattan, New York City, New York, U.S. | |
| 235 | Loss | 161–40–34 | Noel "Boy" McCormick | DQ | 7 (10) | Dec 8, 1920 | Arena, Milwaukie, Oregon, U.S. | |
| 234 | Loss | 161–39–34 | Georges Carpentier | KO | 4 (12) | Oct 12, 1920 | Westside Ballpark, Jersey City, New Jersey, U.S. | Lost world light-heavyweight title; For vacant NYSAC light-heavyweight title |
| 233 | Win | 161–38–34 | Sergeant Ray Smith | NWS | 10 | Jun 26, 1920 | League Park, Cleveland, Ohio, U.S. | |
| 232 | Draw | 160–38–34 | Chuck Wiggins | PTS | 12 | May 21, 1920 | Westwood Field, Dayton, Ohio, U.S. | |
| 231 | Draw | 160–38–33 | Jack Renault | NWS | 12 | May 5, 1920 | Lewiston, Maine, U.S. | |
| 230 | Win | 160–38–32 | Clay Turner | NWS | 12 | May 3, 1920 | Exposition Building, Portland, Oregon, U.S. | |
| 229 | Win | 159–38–32 | Tony Melchior | NWS | 10 | Apr 28, 1920 | Kenosha, Wisconsin, U.S. | |
| 228 | Win | 158–38–32 | Silas Green | NWS | 10 | Apr 19, 1920 | Monument National, Montreal, Quebec, Canada | |
| 227 | Win | 157–38–32 | Clay Turner | NWS | 10 | Mar 26, 1920 | Auditorium, Hartford, Connecticut, U.S. | |
| 226 | Win | 156–38–32 | Al Benedict | NWS | 8 | Mar 22, 1920 | West Hoboken A.C., West Hoboken, New Jersey, U.S. | |
| 225 | Win | 155–38–32 | Clay Turner | NWS | 10 | Feb 16, 1920 | Arena Gardens, Detroit, Michigan, U.S. | |
| 224 | Win | 154–38–32 | Johnny Howard | NWS | 8 | Jan 23, 1920 | Lotus A.C., Perth Amboy, New Jersey, U.S. | |
| 223 | Win | 153–38–32 | Bert Kenny | TKO | 8 (10) | Jan 1, 1920 | Arena Gardens, Toronto, Quebec, Canada | |
| 222 | Draw | 152–38–32 | Clay Turner | NWS | 10 | Nov 24, 1919 | Roller Palace Rink, Detroit, Michigan, U.S. | ABA and world light-heavyweight titles at stake; (via KO only) |
| 221 | Win | 152–38–31 | Bartley Madden | NWS | 10 | Nov 17, 1919 | Monument National, Montreal, Quebec, Canada | |
| 220 | Loss | 151–38–31 | Harry Greb | NWS | 10 | Sep 3, 1919 | State Fair Grounds, Wheeling, West Virginia, U.S. | ABA and world light-heavyweight titles at stake; (via KO only) |
| 219 | Win | 151–37–31 | Clay Turner | NWS | 8 | Aug 11, 1919 | Open-Air Arena, Jersey City, New Jersey, U.S. | |
| 218 | Win | 150–37–31 | Jim Tulle | KO | 1 (10) | Aug 9, 1919 | Tully Coliseum, Saratoga Springs, New York, U.S. | |
| 217 | Win | 149–37–31 | Ed Kinley | NWS | 8 | Jul 25, 1919 | DeForest Gymnasium, Long Branch, New Jersey, U.S. | |
| 216 | Loss | 148–37–31 | Harry Greb | NWS | 6 | Jul 14, 1919 | Shibe Park, Philadelphia, Pennsylvania, U.S. | |
| 215 | Win | 148–36–31 | Billy Miske | NWS | 12 | Jul 3, 1919 | Rossford Arena, Rossford, Ohio, U.S. | ABA and world light-heavyweight titles at stake; (via KO only) |
| 214 | Draw | 147–36–31 | Tim Logan | NWS | 6 | May 20, 1919 | Armory, Chester, Pennsylvania, U.S. | |
| 213 | Loss | 147–36–30 | Johnny Howard | NWS | 8 | May 2, 1919 | Bayonne Pavillion, Bayonne, New Jersey, U.S. | |
| 212 | Loss | 147–35–30 | Harry Greb | NWS | 12 | Apr 28, 1919 | Canton Auditorium, Canton, Ohio, U.S. | |
| 211 | Win | 147–34–30 | Ed Kinley | NWS | 8 | Apr 14, 1919 | McGuigan's Arena, Harrison, New Jersey, U.S. | |
| 210 | Loss | 146–34–30 | Harry Greb | NWS | 10 | Feb 17, 1919 | Broadway Auditorium, Buffalo, New York, U.S. | ABA and world light-heavyweight titles at stake; (via KO only) |
| 209 | Win | 146–33–30 | Jim Coffey | PTS | 12 | Feb 12, 1919 | Arena, Boston, Massachusetts, U.S. | |
| 208 | Win | 145–33–30 | Leo Houck | NWS | 6 | Dec 25, 1918 | Frank Erne Club, Lancaster, Pennsylvania, U.S. | |
| 207 | Loss | 144–33–30 | Jack Dempsey | KO | 3 (6) | Nov 6, 1918 | Olympia A.C., Philadelphia, Pennsylvania, U.S. | |
| 206 | Win | 144–32–30 | Clay Turner | NWS | 8 | Aug 26, 1918 | Jersey City, New Jersey, U.S. | |
| 205 | Loss | 143–32–30 | Harry Greb | NWS | 6 | Aug 6, 1918 | Shibe Park, Philadelphia, Pennsylvania, U.S. | |
| 204 | Loss | 143–31–30 | Bartley Madden | NWS | 8 | Jul 20, 1918 | Atlantic City A.C., Atlantic City, New Jersey, U.S. | |
| 203 | Win | 143–30–30 | Charley Weinert | NWS | 8 | Jun 17, 1918 | Open-Air Arena, Jersey City, New Jersey, U.S. | |
| 202 | Win | 142–30–30 | Jim Coffey | NWS | 6 | Jun 6, 1918 | Broadway Auditorium, Buffalo, New York, U.S. | |
| 201 | Win | 141–30–30 | Bartley Madden | NWS | 15 | May 27, 1918 | Casino Hall, Bridgeport, Connecticut, U.S. | |
| 200 | Draw | 140–30–30 | Bill Brennan | PTS | 12 | Jan 15, 1918 | Grand Opera House, Boston, Massachusetts, U.S. | |
| 199 | Draw | 140–30–29 | Bartley Madden | PTS | 12 | Dec 11, 1917 | Grand Opera House, Boston, Massachusetts, U.S. | |
| 198 | Win | 140–30–28 | Bill Brennan | PTS | 12 | Nov 27, 1917 | Arena, Boston, Massachusetts, U.S. | |
| 197 | Win | 139–30–28 | Zulu Kid | NWS | 10 | Oct 31, 1917 | Sohmer Park, Montreal, Quebec, Canada | |
| 196 | Loss | 138–30–28 | Bill Brennan | PTS | 12 | Oct 23, 1917 | Arena (Armory A.A.), Boston, Massachusetts, U.S. | |
| 195 | Win | 138–29–28 | Tom McMahon | PTS | 12 | Oct 15, 1917 | Winnipeg, Manitoba, Canada | |
| 194 | Draw | 137–29–28 | Bill Brennan | PTS | 12 | Oct 2, 1917 | Arena (Armory A.A.), Boston, Massachusetts, U.S. | |
| 193 | Draw | 137–29–27 | Jim Coffey | PTS | 12 | Sep 11, 1917 | Arena, Boston, Massachusetts, U.S. | |
| 192 | Loss | 137–29–26 | Harry Greb | NWS | 10 | Sep 6, 1917 | Forbes Field, Pittsburgh, Pennsylvania, U.S. | |
| 191 | Win | 137–28–26 | Jack London | TKO | 4 (10) | Aug 6, 1917 | Military A.C., Brooklyn, New York City, New York, U.S. | |
| 190 | Win | 136–28–26 | Al Benedict | NWS | 10 | Jul 16, 1917 | Military A.C., Brooklyn, New York City, New York, U.S. | |
| 189 | Win | 135–28–26 | Al Benedict | NWS | 10 | Jun 25, 1917 | Military A.C., Brooklyn, New York City, New York, U.S. | |
| 188 | Win | 134–28–26 | Johnny Howard | PTS | 12 | Jun 20, 1917 | Marieville Gardens, North Providence, Rhode Island, U.S. | Retained ABA and NYSAC light-heavyweight titles |
| 187 | Win | 133–28–26 | Bartley Madden | NWS | 10 | Jun 15, 1917 | Brown's Gym A.A., Far Rockaway, Queens, New York City, New York, U.S. | |
| 186 | Win | 132–28–26 | Bert Kenny | NWS | 10 | May 26, 1917 | Fairmont A.C., Bronx, New York City, New York, U.S. | |
| 185 | Win | 131–28–26 | Leo Houck | NWS | 6 | May 16, 1917 | York Opera House, York, Pennsylvania, U.S. | |
| 184 | Draw | 130–28–26 | Bob McAllister | NWS | 10 | May 9, 1917 | Fairmont A.C., Bronx, New York City, New York, U.S. | |
| 183 | Loss | 130–28–25 | Tommy Gibbons | NWS | 10 | Mar 23, 1917 | Auditorium, Saint Paul, Minnesota, U.S. | ABA and NYSAC light-heavyweight titles at stake; (via KO only) |
| 182 | Win | 130–27–25 | Jack Moran | PTS | 12 | Mar 6, 1917 | Coliseum, Saint Louis, Missouri, U.S. | |
| 181 | Win | 129–27–25 | Billy Miske | NWS | 10 | Feb 27, 1917 | Auditorium, Saint Paul, Minnesota, U.S. | ABA and NYSAC light-heavyweight titles at stake; (via KO only) |
| 180 | Win | 128–27–25 | Bob Moha | NWS | 12 | Jan 17, 1917 | Grand Opera House, Youngstown, Ohio, U.S. | |
| 179 | Win | 127–27–25 | Jim Smith | NWS | 10 | Jan 12, 1917 | Village A.C., Manhattan, New York City, New York, U.S. | |
| 178 | Win | 126–27–25 | Gunboat Smith | NWS | 10 | Jan 1, 1917 | Clermont Avenue Rink, Brooklyn, New York City, New York, U.S. | |
| 177 | Draw | 125–27–25 | Gus Christie | PTS | 15 | Dec 8, 1916 | Gymnastic Club, Dayton, Ohio, U.S. | |
| 176 | Loss | 125–27–24 | Carl E. Morris | PTS | 15 | Nov 16, 1916 | Convention Hall, Kansas City, Missouri, U.S. | |
| 175 | Loss | 125–26–24 | Billy Miske | NWS | 10 | Oct 30, 1916 | Clermont Avenue Rink, Brooklyn, New York City, New York, U.S. | |
| 174 | Win | 125–25–24 | Jack Dillon | PTS | 12 | Oct 24, 1916 | Arena, Boston, Massachusetts, U.S. | Won ABA and NYSAC light-heavyweight titles |
| 173 | Loss | 124–25–24 | Billy Miske | NWS | 10 | Oct 12, 1916 | Clermont Avenue Rink, Brooklyn, New York City, New York, U.S. | |
| 172 | Win | 124–24–24 | Gunboat Smith | PTS | 12 | Oct 10, 1916 | Arena (Armory A.A.), Boston, Massachusetts, U.S. | |
| 171 | Draw | 123–24–24 | Gus Christie | PTS | 8 | Oct 3, 1916 | Phoenix A.C., Memphis, Tennessee, U.S. | |
| 170 | Win | 123–24–23 | Battling Brandt | NWS | 12 | Sep 26, 1916 | Olympic Coliseum, Columbus, Ohio, U.S. | |
| 169 | Draw | 122–24–23 | Jack Dillon | NWS | 8 | Sep 12, 1916 | Phoenix A.C., Memphis, Tennessee, U.S. | ABA and NYSAC light-heavyweight titles at stake; (via KO only) |
| 168 | Win | 122–24–22 | George K.O. Brown | NWS | 10 | Sep 4, 1916 | East Chicago, Indiana, U.S. | |
| 167 | Win | 121–24–22 | Tommy Burke | PTS | 12 | Jul 25, 1916 | Coliseum, Saint Louis, Missouri, U.S. | |
| 166 | Win | 120–24–22 | George Ashe | NWS | 10 | Jul 21, 1916 | Brown's Gym A.A., Far Rockaway, Queens, New York City, New York, U.S. | |
| 165 | Win | 119–24–22 | Jack Dillon | NWS | 10 | Jul 13, 1916 | Oriole Park, Baltimore, Maryland, U.S. | |
| 164 | Win | 118–24–22 | Jim Barry | NWS | 10 | Jun 30, 1916 | Arena, Syracuse, New York, U.S. | |
| 163 | Draw | 117–24–22 | Porky Dan Flynn | PTS | 8 | May 30, 1916 | Rose A.C., Chattanooga, Tennessee, U.S. | |
| 162 | Win | 117–24–21 | Gunboat Smith | NWS | 6 | May 15, 1916 | Olympia A.C., Philadelphia, Pennsylvania, U.S. | |
| 161 | Loss | 116–24–21 | Jack Dillon | PTS | 15 | Apr 25, 1916 | Convention Hall, Kansas City, Missouri, U.S. | For ABA and NYSAC light-heavyweight titles |
| 160 | Win | 116–23–21 | Mike Fitzgerald | KO | 2 (10) | Apr 19, 1916 | Arena, Toronto, Quebec, Canada | |
| 159 | Loss | 115–23–21 | Jack Dillon | NWS | 10 | Mar 28, 1916 | Broadway Arena, Brooklyn, New York City, New York, U.S. | |
| 158 | Win | 115–22–21 | Jim Savage | TKO | 6 (10) | Mar 25, 1916 | Madison Square Garden, Manhattan, New York City, New York, U.S. | |
| 157 | Win | 114–22–21 | Jack Keating | NWS | 10 | Mar 20, 1916 | Hudson Theatre, Schenectady, Pennsylvania, U.S. | |
| 156 | Win | 113–22–21 | Bob Devere | NWS | 10 | Mar 17, 1916 | Arena, Syracuse, New York, U.S. | |
| 155 | Win | 112–22–21 | Jack Connors | NWS | 10 | Mar 14, 1916 | Hillside Casino, Yonkers, New York, U.S. | |
| 154 | Win | 111–22–21 | Sailor Jack Carroll | NWS | 10 | Mar 9, 1916 | Greenwood A.C., New London, Connecticut, U.S. | |
| 153 | Win | 110–22–21 | Bert Kenny | NWS | 10 | Mar 7, 1916 | Park Theatre, Bridgeport, Connecticut, U.S. | |
| 152 | Win | 109–22–21 | Jack Hanlon | TKO | 3 (10) | Mar 3, 1916 | East New York A.C., Brooklyn, New York City, New York, U.S. | |
| 151 | Win | 108–22–21 | Jack Driscoll | TKO | 3 (10) | Feb 28, 1916 | Long Acre A.C., Manhattan, New York City, New York, U.S. | |
| 150 | Loss | 107–22–21 | Jack Dillon | NWS | 10 | Feb 8, 1916 | Broadway Arena, Brooklyn, New York City, New York, U.S. | |
| 149 | Win | 107–21–21 | Zulu Kid | NWS | 10 | Jan 28, 1916 | Long Acre A.C., Manhattan, New York City, New York, U.S. | |
| 148 | Win | 106–21–21 | Al Reich | PTS | 12 | Jan 25, 1916 | Hippodrome, Boston, Massachusetts, U.S. | |
| 147 | Win | 105–21–21 | Silas Green | NWS | 10 | Jan 21, 1916 | Canadian A.C., Montreal, Quebec, Canada | |
| 146 | Win | 104–21–21 | Tom Cowler | PTS | 12 | Jan 11, 1916 | Hippodrome, Boston, Massachusetts, U.S. | |
| 145 | Win | 103–21–21 | Tom McMahon | NWS | 10 | Jan 1, 1916 | Town Hall, Scranton, Pennsylvania, U.S. | |
| 144 | Win | 102–21–21 | Fireman Jim Flynn | NWS | 10 | Dec 25, 1915 | Broadway S.C., Brooklyn, New York City, New York, U.S. | |
| 143 | Win | 101–21–21 | Jack Connors | NWS | 10 | Dec 20, 1915 | Olympic A.C., Manhattan, New York City, New York, U.S. | |
| 142 | Win | 100–21–21 | Porky Dan Flynn | NWS | 10 | Nov 26, 1915 | Harlem S.C., Manhattan, New York City, New York, U.S. | |
| 141 | Win | 99–21–21 | Tom Cowler | NWS | 10 | Nov 15, 1915 | Olympia Boxing Club, Manhattan, New York City, New York, U.S. | |
| 140 | Win | 98–21–21 | Tom McCarty | NWS | 10 | Nov 13, 1915 | Broadway S.C., Brooklyn, New York City, New York, U.S. | |
| 139 | Win | 97–21–21 | Jack Geyer | NWS | 10 | Nov 8, 1915 | O'Hara Theatre, Shenandoah, Pennsylvania, U.S. | |
| 138 | Draw | 96–21–21 | Porky Dan Flynn | NWS | 6 | Oct 25, 1915 | Exposition Building, Portland, Oregon, U.S. | |
| 137 | Win | 96–21–20 | Soldier Kearns | NWS | 10 | Sep 28, 1915 | Clermont Avenue Rink, Brooklyn, New York City, New York, U.S. | |
| 136 | Win | 95–21–20 | Sandy Ferguson | PTS | 12 | Sep 14, 1915 | Atlas A.A., Boston, Massachusetts, U.S. | |
| 135 | Win | 94–21–20 | Soldier Kearns | NWS | 10 | Aug 28, 1915 | Broadway S.C., Brooklyn, New York City, New York, U.S. | |
| 134 | Win | 93–21–20 | Sailor Jack Carroll | NWS | 10 | Aug 14, 1915 | Broadway S.C., Brooklyn, New York City, New York, U.S. | |
| 133 | Win | 92–21–20 | Colin Bell | NWS | 10 | Aug 6, 1915 | Brown's Gym A.A., Far Rockaway, Queens, New York City, New York, U.S. | |
| 132 | Win | 91–21–20 | Joe Rosen | NWS | 6 | Jul 13, 1915 | Douglas A.C., Philadelphia, Pennsylvania, U.S. | |
| 131 | Win | 90–21–20 | Porky Dan Flynn | NWS | 10 | Jul 9, 1915 | Brown's Gym A.A., Far Rockaway, Queens, New York City, New York, U.S. | |
| 130 | Win | 89–21–20 | K.O. Sullivan | NWS | 10 | Jul 2, 1915 | O'Hara Theatre, Shenandoah, Pennsylvania, U.S. | |
| 129 | Win | 88–21–20 | Porky Dan Flynn | NWS | 10 | May 31, 1915 | Ebbets Field, Brooklyn, New York City, New York, U.S. | |
| 128 | Win | 87–21–20 | George Ashe | NWS | 10 | May 28, 1915 | Brown's Gym A.A., Far Rockaway, Queens, New York City, New York, U.S. | |
| 127 | Win | 86–21–20 | Jack Connors | NWS | 10 | May 14, 1915 | Vanderbilt A.C., Brooklyn, New York City, New York, U.S. | |
| 126 | Win | 85–21–20 | Zulu Kid | NWS | 10 | Apr 3, 1915 | Federal A.C., Manhattan, New York City, New York, U.S. | |
| 125 | Win | 84–21–20 | Tom McCarty | NWS | 10 | Mar 27, 1915 | Broadway S.C., Brooklyn, New York City, New York, U.S. | |
| 124 | Win | 83–21–20 | Jack Hanlon | NWS | 10 | Mar 23, 1915 | Astoria S C, Astoria, New York, U.S. | |
| 123 | Win | 82–21–20 | Billy Ketchell | NWS | 10 | Mar 19, 1915 | 135th Street A.C., Manhattan, New York City, New York, U.S. | |
| 122 | Win | 81–21–20 | George Ashe | NWS | 6 | Mar 8, 1915 | Olympia A.C., Philadelphia, Pennsylvania, U.S. | |
| 121 | Draw | 80–21–20 | Sailor Fred Fritts | NWS | 10 | Mar 6, 1915 | Irving A.C., Brooklyn, New York City, New York, U.S. | |
| 120 | Loss | 80–21–19 | Gunboat Smith | PTS | 20 | Jan 27, 1915 | Greenwall Theater, New Orleans, Louisiana, U.S. | |
| 119 | Win | 80–20–19 | Jack Keating | NWS | 10 | Jan 6, 1915 | Federal A.C., Manhattan, New York City, New York, U.S. | |
| 118 | Draw | 79–20–19 | Gunboat Smith | PTS | 12 | Jan 1, 1915 | Auditorium, Waterbury, Connecticut, U.S. | |
| 117 | Draw | 79–20–18 | Porky Dan Flynn | NWS | 10 | Dec 25, 1914 | Broadway S.C., Brooklyn, New York City, New York, U.S. | |
| 116 | Loss | 79–20–17 | Tom McCarty | NWS | 10 | Nov 26, 1914 | Irving A.C., Brooklyn, New York City, New York, U.S. | |
| 115 | Win | 79–19–17 | Zulu Kid | NWS | 10 | Nov 21, 1914 | Irving A.C., Brooklyn, New York City, New York, U.S. | Not to be confused with Young Zulu Kid |
| 114 | Draw | 78–19–17 | Frank Mantell | PTS | 12 | Nov 5, 1914 | Rhode Island A.C., Providence, Rhode Island, U.S. | |
| 113 | Win | 78–19–16 | Terry Kellar | NWS | 10 | Oct 31, 1914 | Fairmont A.C., Bronx, New York City, New York, U.S. | |
| 112 | Win | 77–19–16 | Sailor Fred Fritts | NWS | 10 | Oct 30, 1914 | Empire A.C., Manhattan, New York City, New York, U.S. | |
| 111 | Win | 76–19–16 | Fireman Jim Flynn | NWS | 10 | Oct 20, 1914 | Broadway S.C., Brooklyn, New York City, New York, U.S. | |
| 110 | Win | 75–19–16 | Gunboat Smith | NWS | 10 | Oct 9, 1914 | Manhattan Casino, Manhattan, New York City, New York, U.S. | |
| 109 | Loss | 74–19–16 | George Davis | NWS | 10 | Sep 18, 1914 | Broadway Auditorium, Buffalo, New York, U.S. | |
| 108 | Win | 74–18–16 | Jack Nevins | KO | 2 (10) | Aug 31, 1914 | Brown's Gym A.A., Far Rockaway, Queens, New York City, New York, U.S. | |
| 107 | Win | 73–18–16 | Bartley Madden | NWS | 10 | Aug 19, 1914 | St. Nicholas Arena, Manhattan, New York City, New York, U.S. | |
| 106 | Draw | 72–18–16 | Sailor Fred Fritts | NWS | 10 | Aug 18, 1914 | Broadway S.C., Brooklyn, New York City, New York, U.S. | |
| 105 | Win | 72–18–15 | Jack Driscoll | NWS | 10 | Jul 31, 1914 | Brown's Gym A.A., Far Rockaway, Queens, New York City, New York, U.S. | |
| 104 | Win | 71–18–15 | Porky Dan Flynn | NWS | 10 | Jul 21, 1914 | Broadway S.C., Brooklyn, New York City, New York, U.S. | |
| 103 | Win | 70–18–15 | Charley Weinert | NWS | 10 | Jun 30, 1914 | Broadway Arena, Brooklyn, New York City, New York, U.S. | |
| 102 | Win | 69–18–15 | Bert Kenny | NWS | 10 | Jun 26, 1914 | Brown's Gym A.A., Far Rockaway, Queens, New York City, New York, U.S. | |
| 101 | Win | 68–18–15 | Jack Davies | KO | 7 (10) | Jun 6, 1914 | Fairmont A.C., Bronx, New York City, New York, U.S. | |
| 100 | Loss | 67–18–15 | Jack Dillon | NWS | 10 | May 29, 1914 | Federal Park, Indianapolis, Indiana, U.S. | World light-heavyweight title at stake; (via KO only) |
| 99 | Win | 67–17–15 | Carl Lewis | NWS | 10 | May 19, 1914 | Broadway S.C., Brooklyn, New York City, New York, U.S. | |
| 98 | Loss | 66–17–15 | Jack Dillon | PTS | 12 | Apr 14, 1914 | Holland Arena, Butte, Montana, U.S. | Dillon claimed vacant world light-heavyweight title |
| 97 | Loss | 66–16–15 | Bob Moha | NWS | 10 | Mar 23, 1914 | Southside A.A., Milwaukee, Wisconsin, U.S. | |
| 96 | Win | 66–15–15 | Sailor Fred Fritts | NWS | 10 | Mar 17, 1914 | Broadway S.C., Brooklyn, New York City, New York, U.S. | |
| 95 | Win | 65–15–15 | Tim O'Neil | NWS | 6 | Mar 14, 1914 | National A.C., Philadelphia, Pennsylvania, U.S. | |
| 94 | Win | 64–15–15 | Jim Coffey | NWS | 10 | Mar 9, 1914 | Madison Square Garden, Manhattan, New York City, New York, U.S. | |
| 93 | Win | 63–15–15 | Jack Keating | NWS | 10 | Mar 7, 1914 | Broadway S.C., Brooklyn, New York City, New York, U.S. | |
| 92 | Win | 62–15–15 | Fred McKay | NWS | 10 | Mar 3, 1914 | Broadway S.C., Brooklyn, New York City, New York, U.S. | |
| 91 | Win | 61–15–15 | Tom McMahon | NWS | 10 | Feb 6, 1914 | Empire A.C., New Star Casino, Manhattan, New York City, New York, U.S. | |
| 90 | Win | 60–15–15 | Tony Ross | NWS | 6 | Jan 31, 1914 | National A.C., Philadelphia, Pennsylvania, U.S. | |
| 89 | Win | 59–15–15 | Soldier Kearns | NWS | 10 | Jan 27, 1914 | Atlantic Garden A.C., Manhattan, New York City, New York, U.S. | |
| 88 | Win | 58–15–15 | Bob Kenny | TKO | 3 (10) | Jan 22, 1914 | Allentown, Pennsylvania, U.S. | |
| 87 | Win | 57–15–15 | Jack Keating | NWS | 10 | Jan 20, 1914 | Liberty A.C., Bridgeport, Connecticut, U.S. | |
| 86 | Win | 56–15–15 | Jack Connors | NWS | 10 | Jan 19, 1914 | Sharkey A.C., Manhattan, New York City, New York, U.S. | |
| 85 | Win | 55–15–15 | Porky Dan Flynn | NWS | 10 | Jan 13, 1914 | National S.C., Manhattan, New York City, New York, U.S. | |
| 84 | Loss | 54–15–15 | Bob McAllister | NWS | 10 | Jan 5, 1914 | Madison Square Garden, Manhattan, New York City, New York, U.S. | |
| 83 | Win | 54–14–15 | Jim Coffey | NWS | 6 | Jan 3, 1914 | National A.C., Philadelphia, Pennsylvania, U.S. | |
| 82 | Win | 53–14–15 | Tommy Daly | KO | 2 (10) | Jan 1, 1914 | Atlantic Garden A.C., Manhattan, New York City, New York, U.S. | |
| 81 | Win | 52–14–15 | Jack Driscoll | NWS | 10 | Dec 25, 1913 | Irving A.C., Brooklyn, New York City, New York, U.S. | |
| 80 | Win | 51–14–15 | Jim Coffey | NWS | 10 | Dec 22, 1913 | Madison Square Garden, Manhattan, New York City, New York, U.S. | |
| 79 | Win | 50–14–15 | Fireman Jim Flynn | NWS | 10 | Dec 9, 1913 | Atlantic Garden A.C., Manhattan, New York City, New York, U.S. | |
| 78 | Draw | 49–14–15 | Charley Weinert | NWS | 10 | Dec 2, 1913 | Brown's Gym, Manhattan, New York City, New York, U.S. | |
| 77 | Win | 49–14–14 | Yankee Gilbert | TKO | 4 (10) | Nov 24, 1913 | Olympic A.C., Manhattan, New York City, New York, U.S. | |
| 76 | Win | 48–14–14 | Ed Hagen | KO | 7 (10) | Nov 20, 1913 | Atlantic Garden A.C., Manhattan, New York City, New York, U.S. | |
| 75 | Win | 47–14–14 | Tim Logan | NWS | 10 | Nov 18, 1913 | Brown's Gym, Manhattan, New York City, New York, U.S. | |
| 74 | Win | 46–14–14 | Soldier Bachus | KO | 9 (10) | Nov 15, 1913 | Sharkey A.C., Manhattan, New York City, New York, U.S. | |
| 73 | Win | 45–14–14 | Jack Keating | NWS | 10 | Sep 30, 1913 | Atlantic Garden A.C., Manhattan, New York City, New York, U.S. | |
| 72 | Win | 44–14–14 | Jack "Twin" Sullivan | NWS | 10 | Sep 27, 1913 | Irving A.C., Brooklyn, New York City, New York, U.S. | |
| 71 | Win | 43–14–14 | Frank McGuinness | KO | 6 (10) | Sep 23, 1913 | Atlantic Garden A.C., Manhattan, New York City, New York, U.S. | |
| 70 | Win | 42–14–14 | Whitey Allen | TKO | 3 (10) | Sep 17, 1913 | St. Nicholas Arena, Manhattan, New York City, New York, U.S. | |
| 69 | Loss | 41–14–14 | Eddie McGoorty | NWS | 10 | Sep 10, 1913 | St. Nicholas Arena, Manhattan, New York City, New York, U.S. | |
| 68 | Win | 41–13–14 | Nick Muller | TKO | 6 (10) | Aug 27, 1913 | St. Nicholas Arena, Manhattan, New York City, New York, U.S. | |
| 67 | Win | 40–13–14 | Sailor White | NWS | 10 | Aug 19, 1913 | Atlantic A.A., Rockaway Beach, Queens, New York City, New York, U.S. | |
| 66 | Win | 39–13–14 | Tim Logan | NWS | 10 | Aug 13, 1913 | St. Nicholas Arena, Manhattan, New York City, New York, U.S. | |
| 65 | Draw | 38–13–14 | Porky Dan Flynn | NWS | 10 | Jul 30, 1913 | St. Nicholas Arena, Manhattan, New York City, New York, U.S. | |
| 64 | Loss | 38–13–13 | Jack "Twin" Sullivan | NWS | 10 | Jul 3, 1913 | Broadway Auditorium, Buffalo, New York, U.S. | |
| 63 | Draw | 38–12–13 | Jack Dillon | NWS | 10 | Apr 17, 1913 | Rochester, New York, U.S. | |
| 62 | Draw | 38–12–12 | George Davis | NWS | 10 | Mar 7, 1913 | Broadway Auditorium, Buffalo, New York, U.S. | |
| 61 | Win | 38–12–11 | Tom McMahon | NWS | 10 | Feb 10, 1913 | Broadway Auditorium, Buffalo, New York, U.S. | |
| 60 | Win | 37–12–11 | Dick Gilbert | PTS | 25 | Dec 20, 1912 | Jacksonville, Florida, U.S. | |
| 59 | Win | 36–12–11 | Tom Kennedy | NWS | 6 | Nov 28, 1912 | Olympia A.C., Philadelphia, Pennsylvania, U.S. | |
| 58 | Win | 35–12–11 | Harry Ramsey | NWS | 6 | Nov 12, 1912 | Spring Garden A.C., Philadelphia, Pennsylvania, U.S. | |
| 57 | Win | 34–12–11 | Eddie McGoorty | NWS | 6 | Sep 28, 1912 | National A.C., Philadelphia, Pennsylvania, U.S. | |
| 56 | Loss | 33–12–11 | Dave Smith | NWS | 6 | Sep 21, 1912 | National A.C., Philadelphia, Pennsylvania, U.S. | |
| 55 | Win | 33–11–11 | Emmett "Kid" Wagner | NWS | 6 | Sep 7, 1912 | National A.C., Philadelphia, Pennsylvania, U.S. | |
| 54 | Win | 32–11–11 | Harry Wuest | NWS | 15 | Jul 19, 1912 | Jacksonville, Florida, U.S. | |
| 53 | Win | 31–11–11 | Dick Gilbert | PTS | 20 | Jun 14, 1912 | Jacksonville, Florida, U.S. | |
| 52 | Win | 30–11–11 | Dick Gilbert | PTS | 15 | Jun 7, 1912 | Jacksonville, Florida, U.S. | |
| 51 | Win | 29–11–11 | Dick Gilbert | PTS | 15 | May 24, 1912 | Jacksonville, Florida, U.S. | |
| 50 | Win | 28–11–11 | Emmett "Kid" Wagner | NWS | 10 | May 17, 1912 | Luzerne Theater, Wilkes-Barre, Pennsylvania, U.S. | |
| 49 | Win | 27–11–11 | Eddie Palmer | NWS | 10 | May 3, 1912 | Wilkes-Barre, Pennsylvania, U.S. | |
| 48 | Draw | 26–11–11 | Tony Caponi | PTS | 10 | Apr 16, 1912 | Gate City A.C., Atlanta, Georgia, U.S. | |
| 47 | Win | 26–11–10 | Larry Williams | NWS | 6 | Apr 4, 1912 | Broadway A.C., Philadelphia, Pennsylvania, U.S. | |
| 46 | Win | 25–11–10 | Peck Miller | PTS | 10 | Mar 21, 1912 | Keystone A.C., Allentown, Pennsylvania, U.S. | |
| 45 | Draw | 24–11–10 | Bill MacKinnon | NWS | 10 | Mar 19, 1912 | Brown's Gym, Manhattan, New York City, New York, U.S. | |
| 44 | Draw | 24–11–9 | Eddie Palmer | NWS | 6 | Mar 12, 1912 | Douglas A.C., Philadelphia, Pennsylvania, U.S. | |
| 43 | Loss | 24–11–8 | Eddie McGoorty | NWS | 6 | Feb 12, 1912 | Old City Hall, Pittsburgh, Pennsylvania, U.S. | |
| 42 | Win | 24–10–8 | George Ashe | TKO | 13 (15) | Feb 8, 1912 | Monumental Theater, Baltimore, Maryland, U.S. | |
| 41 | Draw | 23–10–8 | George Ashe | NWS | 6 | Jan 18, 1912 | Broadway A.C., Philadelphia, Pennsylvania, U.S. | |
| 40 | Win | 23–10–7 | Joe Grim | NWS | 6 | Jan 11, 1912 | Broadway A.C., Philadelphia, Pennsylvania, U.S. | |
| 39 | Loss | 22–10–7 | Jeff Clark | NWS | 15 | Dec 27, 1911 | Southwest A.C., Joplin, Missouri, U.S. | |
| 38 | Loss | 22–9–7 | Jeff Clark | NWS | 15 | Dec 14, 1911 | Joplin, Missouri, U.S. | |
| 37 | Loss | 22–8–7 | Leo Houck | PTS | 12 | Oct 24, 1911 | Arena (Armory A.A.), Boston, Massachusetts, U.S. | |
| 36 | Loss | 22–7–7 | Jack Dillon | NWS | 6 | Oct 23, 1911 | American A.C., Philadelphia, Pennsylvania, U.S. | |
| 35 | Draw | 22–6–7 | Jim Barry | NWS | 6 | Oct 2, 1911 | American A.C., Philadelphia, Pennsylvania, U.S. | |
| 34 | Win | 22–6–6 | Jumbo Wells | NWS | 6 | Sep 18, 1911 | American A.C., Philadelphia, Pennsylvania, U.S. | |
| 33 | Draw | 21–6–6 | Jack Mitchell | NWS | 10 | Aug 12, 1911 | Tamaqua AC., Tamaqua, Pennsylvania, U.S. | |
| 32 | Win | 21–6–5 | Billy West | NWS | 10 | Aug 8, 1911 | Brown's Gym A.A., Far Rockaway, Queens, New York City, New York, U.S. | |
| 31 | Loss | 20–6–5 | Frank Mantell | NWS | 10 | Jul 11, 1911 | Brown's Gym, Manhattan, New York City, New York, U.S. | |
| 30 | Win | 20–5–5 | Ralph Calloway | NWS | 10 | Jun 26, 1911 | Lark Street Auditorium, Albany, New York, U.S. | |
| 29 | Win | 19–5–5 | Al Kubiak | NWS | 6 | May 23, 1911 | Douglas A.C., Philadelphia, Pennsylvania, U.S. | |
| 28 | Draw | 18–5–5 | Mike Glover | NWS | 6 | Apr 3, 1911 | American A.C., Philadelphia, Pennsylvania, U.S. | |
| 27 | Draw | 18–5–4 | Tom McMahon | NWS | 6 | Mar 25, 1911 | National A.C., Philadelphia, Pennsylvania, U.S. | |
| 26 | Loss | 18–5–3 | Leo Houck | NWS | 6 | Mar 16, 1911 | Lancaster, Pennsylvania, U.S. | |
| 25 | Loss | 18–4–3 | Leo Houck | NWS | 6 | Feb 2, 1911 | Lancaster, Pennsylvania, U.S. | |
| 24 | Draw | 18–3–3 | Mike Glover | NWS | 6 | Jan 28, 1911 | American A.C., Philadelphia, Pennsylvania, U.S. | |
| 23 | Win | 18–3–2 | Jack Doyle | NWS | 6 | Jan 24, 1911 | Douglas A.C., Philadelphia, Pennsylvania, U.S. | |
| 22 | Win | 17–3–2 | Jimmy Howard | NWS | 6 | Jan 7, 1911 | National A.C., Philadelphia, Pennsylvania, U.S. | |
| 21 | Win | 16–3–2 | Jack Fitzgerald | NWS | 6 | Jan 2, 1911 | American A.C., Philadelphia, Pennsylvania, U.S. | |
| 20 | Win | 15–3–2 | Young Tommy Coleman | NWS | 6 | Dec 23, 1910 | National A.C., Philadelphia, Pennsylvania, U.S. | |
| 19 | Win | 14–3–2 | Jackie Clark | NWS | 6 | Dec 17, 1910 | National A.C., Philadelphia, Pennsylvania, U.S. | |
| 18 | Draw | 13–3–2 | Jimmy Glavin | NWS | 6 | Dec 10, 1910 | National A.C., Philadelphia, Pennsylvania, U.S. | |
| 17 | Loss | 13–3–1 | Jack Fitzgerald | NWS | 6 | Dec 5, 1910 | West End A.C., Philadelphia, Pennsylvania, U.S. | |
| 16 | Win | 13–2–1 | Mickey McDonough | NWS | 6 | Nov 24, 1910 | Nonpareil A.C., Philadelphia, Pennsylvania, U.S. | |
| 15 | Win | 12–2–1 | Billy Burke | NWS | 6 | Oct 25, 1910 | Douglas A.C., Philadelphia, Pennsylvania, U.S. | |
| 14 | Win | 11–2–1 | Jack Ferry | KO | 1 (6) | Oct 11, 1910 | Douglas A.C., Philadelphia, Pennsylvania, U.S. | |
| 13 | Loss | 10–2–1 | Peck Miller | NWS | 6 | Oct 1, 1910 | National A.C., Philadelphia, Pennsylvania, U.S. | |
| 12 | Win | 10–1–1 | Jack Doyle | NWS | 6 | Sep 17, 1910 | National A.C., Philadelphia, Pennsylvania, U.S. | |
| 11 | Win | 9–1–1 | Johnny Dugan | TKO | 3 (6) | Sep 6, 1910 | Douglas A.C., Philadelphia, Pennsylvania, U.S. | |
| 10 | Win | 8–1–1 | Joe Page | NWS | 6 | Aug 30, 1910 | Douglas A.C., Philadelphia, Pennsylvania, U.S. | |
| 9 | Win | 7–1–1 | Farmer Harris | NWS | 6 | Aug 16, 1910 | Douglas A.C., Philadelphia, Pennsylvania, U.S. | |
| 8 | Win | 6–1–1 | Al Fox | TKO | 3 (6) | Jun 27, 1910 | West End A.C., Philadelphia, Pennsylvania, U.S. | |
| 7 | Loss | 5–1–1 | Kid Selb | NWS | 6 | May 2, 1910 | Willis A.C., Philadelphia, Pennsylvania, U.S. | |
| 6 | Win | 5–0–1 | Joe O'Neill | KO | 3 (6) | Apr 26, 1910 | Douglas A.C., Philadelphia, Pennsylvania, U.S. | |
| 5 | Win | 4–0–1 | Joe Sandy | KO | 2 (6) | Apr 19, 1910 | Douglas A.C., Philadelphia, Pennsylvania, U.S. | |
| 4 | Win | 3–0–1 | Jimmy Dolan | NWS | 6 | Apr 4, 1910 | West End A.C., Philadelphia, Pennsylvania, U.S. | |
| 3 | Win | 2–0–1 | Reddy Hogan | NWS | 6 | Mar 14, 1910 | Willis A.C., Philadelphia, Pennsylvania, U.S. | |
| 2 | Draw | 1–0–1 | Lew Diamond | NWS | 6 | Mar 5, 1910 | National A.C., Philadelphia, Pennsylvania, U.S. | |
| 1 | Win | 1–0 | Matt Ryan | TKO | 1 (6) | Feb 3, 1910 | Broadway A.C., Philadelphia, Pennsylvania, U.S. | |

== See also ==
- List of light heavyweight boxing champions
- List of select Jewish boxers

Awards and achievements
| Preceded by Jack Dillon | World Light Heavyweight Champion; 24 October 1916–12 October 1920 | Succeeded by Georges Carpentier |
