= Jackie Burke =

Jackie Burke may refer to:

- Jack Burke Jr. (1923–2024), American professional golfer, commonly known as Jackie Burke
- Jackie Burke (boxer) (1914–1978), American professional boxer born Jacob Berkenpas
- Jack Burke (boxer) (1869–1913), American professional boxer
