= Rube Ferns =

American boxer

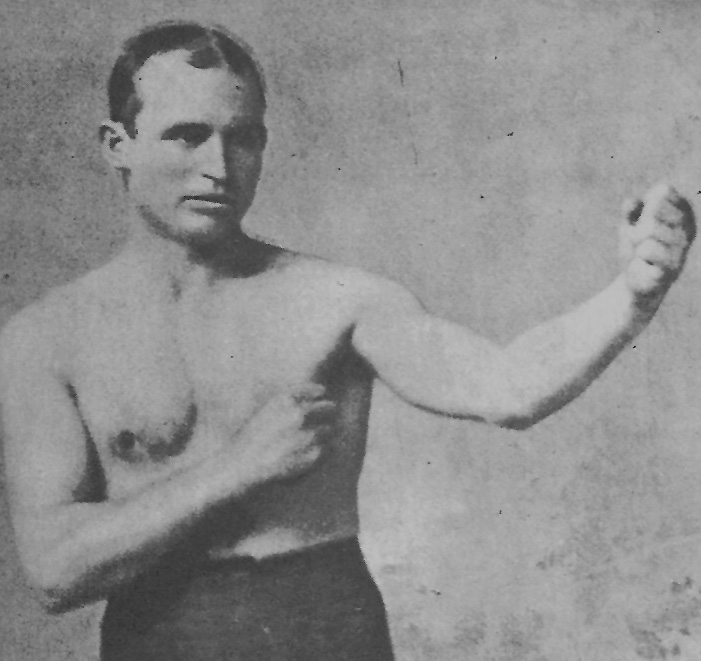

Personal information
- Nickname: The Kansas Rube
- Nationality: American
- Born: James Ferns; October 30, 1873 Pittsburgh, Pennsylvania
- Died: June 11, 1952 (aged 78) Scammon, Kansas
- Height: 5 ft 8 in (1.73 m)
- Weight: Welterweight

Boxing career
- Stance: Orthodox

Boxing record
- Total fights: 74
- Wins: 46
- Win by KO: 33
- Losses: 19
- Draws: 9

Rube Ferns (born James Ferns; October 30, 1873 – June 11, 1952) was an American boxer of the early 20th century. Nicknamed "The Kansas Rube", he held the World Welterweight Championship in 1900 and 1901. He was formidable and scrappy with a good punch.

He defeated such men as "Mysterious" Billy Smith, Eddie Connolly, Bobby Dobbs, William "Matty" Matthews, Frank Erne, Owen Zeigler, "Scaldy" Bill Quinn, Harry Pigeon, Frank "Dutch" Neal, Paddy Purtell and Shorty Ahearn. He lost his title to Barbados Joe Walcott in December 1901. He was known as a powerful hitter with an impressive knockout record.

== Early career ==
One reporter described Ferns as "one of the queerest and most eccentric practitioners in a profession that has attracted many freaks". He was born into a coal-mining family in Pennsylvania. In 1880 they moved to Central Illinois and finally settled in Scammon, Kansas in 1886. Many of his early bouts took place in nearby Pittsburg, Kansas thus creating confusion about his early years. He always dressed like a stage farmer in go-to-meeting clothes...Ferns was tall and angular and did not look like a fighter. According to BoxRec, Ferns began his career by 1896 with six straight knockouts of boxers Jack Dougherty, Tom Mackey, Harry Pigeon, Cass Whitman, Ed Doyle, and Fred Ross. Half of these fights were known to have been in the Southeast Kansas area, in Cherokee and Crawford counties. In 1897, Ferns fought in some larger cities and New England venues, meeting Kid Gardner in a draw in Chicago in February, and Izzy Straus and Lou Demonge in Brooklyn Clubs in June. In July, he lost to Bobby Dobbs in Hartford, Connecticut.

== Taking the World Welterweight Title ==
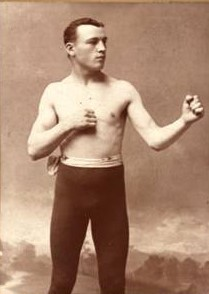
Mysterious Billy Smith

On January 15, 1900, Ferns fought his first bout billed as a World Welterweight Title, defeating "Mysterious" Billy Smith at the Hawthorne Athletic Club in Buffalo, New York. According to BoxRec, Smith knocked Ferns down fifteen times before fouling him and losing the fight in the twenty first of twenty-five rounds, indicating Fern's claim to the title was not firmly established by this bout. Ferns' second defeat of Smith on August 30 gave him a more authoritative claim to the title as he won a more decisive victory and had defeated several important contenders prior to the fight.

Smith was legendary for his dirty fighting tactics. Eddie McBride, referee for the January 15, 1900 bout in Buffalo bout between Smith and Ferns wrote, "The nastiest fight I ever refereed was between Rube Ferns and Mysterious Billy Smith, the toughest mortal that ever entered a ring. Smith was exceptionally dirty that night and repeated warnings for hitting in clinches having no effect. I disqualified him...in the 23rd. Smith had deliberately leaned over Fern's shoulder and expectorated in my face". McBride had actually disqualified Smith in the 21st round, and it was an important bout, marking the assumption of the World Welterweight Title by Ferns according to many sources.

On August 13, 1900, Ferns defended his World Welterweight Championship against contender Eddie Connolly, before a crowd of 1800 at the Olympic Club in Buffalo in a fifteenth-round technical knockout of a planned twenty-five. In the final round, Connolly through up his hands after three light shots to the ribs, indicating he could not continue the bout, and his seconds threw in the towel.

Ferns fought three more bouts in 1900 that increased his recognition as the primary World Welterweight Title contender, and helped him to gain full recognition as the champion. In February, he defeated Mike Donovan again at the Hawthorne Athletic Club in Baltimore in a 20-round points decision listed as the 145 pound championship of the world. He knocked out Jack Hanley on March 20, 1900, in a non-title bout in six rounds in Fort Erie, Ontario. More significantly, Ferns convincingly knocked out Jack Bennett in the first of twenty rounds in Toronto, Ontario, Canada. The BBBC recognized this title as both the American and World Welterweight boxing title in their 2004 Boxing Yearbook.

=== Historic bouts with Matty Matthews ===
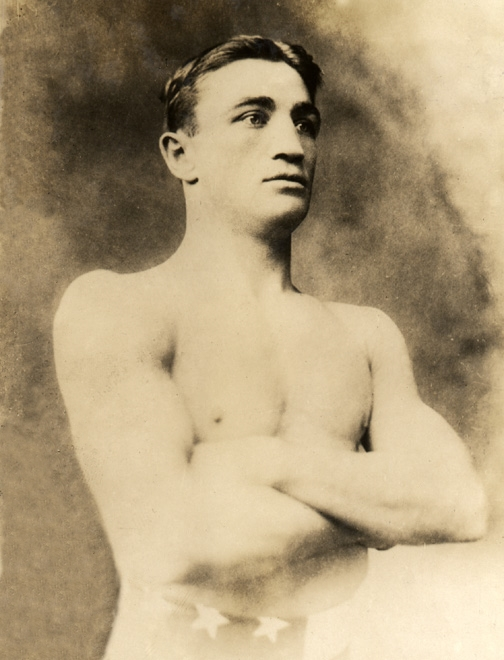
Matty Matthews

Continuing to establish his legacy as the Welterweight Championship, Ferns defeated Matty Matthews on August 30, 1900, at the Lightguard Armory in Detroit, Michigan in a fifteen-round points decision. The Detroit Free Press wrote, "Rube Ferns demonstrated that he is a hard hitting, game and dangerous man and clearly entitled to the honor which he now holds, that of welterweight champion."

In two rematches with Matthews for the World Title, Ferns lost on October 16, 1900, in a full fifteen round points decision losing the title though suffering from open sores. Ferns re-took the title on May 24, 1901, in Toronto, Ontario, Canada in a tenth-round knockout which may have been a close bout prior to the final blow. The Bridgeport Herald wrote "that in the tenth round Ferns landed a stomach blow, followed by a punch to the head that knocked out Matthews. The Pittsburgh Press further authenticated the passing of the title from Matty Matthews to Ferns, when it wrote of the May 24, 1901 bout, "Matty Matthews, the New Yorker, who held the title stacked up against Rube Ferns, of Kansas, and was laid low in ten rounds." Showing there was some flex among boxing reporters as to when Ferns first took the title, the Milwaukee-Journal recognized that Ferns first took the title in his defeat of Mysterious Smith, passing the title to Ferns in the process as early as January 1900, but Fern's assumption of the title is also widely recognized with his October 16, 1900 defeat of Matty Matthews.

Ferns had two more important defenses of the Welterweight title, first on September 23, 1901, against the lightweight champion Frank Erne in front of an enthusiastic crowd of 4,500 at the International Athletic Club in Ft. Erie, Ontario, Canada in a ninth-round knockout.

In another bout which was very likely a title defense, Ferns defeated Charles Dutch Thurston on November 28, 1901, at the Light Guard Armory in Detroit, Michigan in a full fifteen round points decision.

== Losing the Welterweight World Championship ==
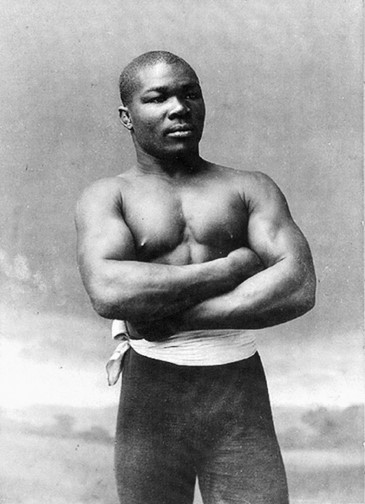
Joe Walcott

On December 18, 1901, Ferns lost the Welterweight Championship of the World to the great Barbados Joe Walcott, one of the greatest lightweights in boxing history. Walcott defeated Ferns in a fifth-round TKO at the International Athletic Club in Fort Erie, Ontario. The Toronto Star wrote "Walcott battered down Ferns with terrific body blows, and right and left swings to the head. To save Ferns from being completely knocked out, Referee McBride stopped the bout." The Richmond Dispatch, running the same story, continued, "In the fifth and last round Walcott sent Ferns to the boards on two occasions, and Rube twice took the count. When he rose the second time, he was in a weakened condition." The bout was described as "the fastest and fiercest ever fought in the new club-house."

== Boxing achievements ==
When Ferns first took the welterweight title may be in minor dispute, as many sources recognize Fern's claim to the title as early as his defeat of Mysterious Billy Smith on January 15, 1900, though Smith did not as he claimed he was winning the fight before his disqualification, and the claim had some validity. Ferns defeat of Matty Matthew's on August 30, 1900, is probably the welterweight title bout that gained the widest publicity of the title passing, though Ferns won title bouts earlier in the year. Fern's loss of the title on December 18, 1901, to Joe Walcott was widely recognized as the date the welterweight title passed to Walcott from Ferns, as the bout garnered a great deal of publicity and Ferns lost decisively by knockout to a well known opponent.

Ferns continued boxing until around 1910 and took on some high-profile contenders, including three more bouts with Matty Matthews, and two each with Martin Duffy and Charley Sieger. One of his last bouts was a loss to Wildcat Ferns on April 5, 1910, in Oklahoma City, Oklahoma.

== Retirement from boxing and work as referee ==
Ferns worked as a referee from his early days in boxing, throughout his career, and into his retirement. He refereed at least fourteen bouts between November 1899 and December 1922, including bouts with Wildcat Ferns, Kid Stein, Otto Knopp, Joe Leonard, and brothers Art and Dennis Magirl. He refereed primarily in the New York area, and out west after his retirement from boxing.

Ferns died on June 11, 1952.

== Official Professional boxing record ==
74 fights	43 wins	18 losses
By knockout	32	9
By decision	10	8
By disqualification	1	1
Draws	10	
Newspaper decisions/draws	3	

All Newspaper decisions are regarded as “no decision” bouts as they have “resulted in neither boxer winning or losing, and would therefore not count as part of their official fight record."

No.	Result	Record	Opponent	Type	Round	Date	Location	Notes
74	Loss	43–18–10 (3)	Wildcat Ferns	TKO	4 (15)	Apr 5, 1910	Auditorium, Oklahoma City, Oklahoma, U.S.	
73	Loss	43–17–10 (3)	Kid Farmer	TKO	5 (10)	Sep 27, 1907	Springfield, Illinois, U.S.	
72	Draw	43–16–10 (3)	John Dukelow	PTS	10	Dec 19, 1906	Rochester, New York, U.S.	
71	Draw	43–16–9 (3)	Charley Sieger	PTS	20	Jun 20, 1906	Lock City A.C., Lockport, New York, U.S.	
70	Win	43–16–8 (3)	Art Mason	PTS	15	Jun 1, 1906	Ortner's Hall, Buffalo, New York, U.S.	
69	Win	42–16–8 (3)	Charlie Conkle	DQ	3 (10)	May 15, 1906	Lyceum Theater, Niagara Falls, New York, U.S.	
68	Loss	41–16–8 (3)	Charley Hitte	DQ	7 (20)	Apr 18, 1906	Albany, New York, U.S.	
67	Draw	41–15–8 (3)	Charley Sieger	PTS	15	Mar 21, 1906	Miller's Hall, Buffalo, New York, U.S.	
66	Draw	41–15–7 (3)	Mike Donovan	NWS	6	Mar 17, 1906	18th Regiment Armory, Pittsburgh, Pennsylvania, U.S.	
65	Win	41–15–7 (2)	Matty Matthews	KO	9 (15)	Mar 16, 1906	International A.C., Buffalo, New York, U.S.	
64	Win	40–15–7 (2)	Billy Delaney	KO	4 (15)	Feb 22, 1906	Godfroy's Pavilion, Reed's Lake, Michigan, U.S.	
63	Win	39–15–7 (2)	Gus Gardner	NWS	15	Feb 12, 1906	International A.C., Buffalo, New York, U.S.	
62	Loss	39–15–7 (1)	Billy Rhodes	TKO	3 (20)	Sep 24, 1905	Island Park, Kansas City, Missouri, U.S.	
61	Draw	39–14–7 (1)	Jack Dunleavy	PTS	17	Aug 20, 1905	Island Park, Kansas City, Missouri, U.S.	
60	Win	39–14–6 (1)	Eugene Bezenah	NWS	20	Mar 28, 1904	Weir, Kansas, U.S.	
59	Loss	39–14–6	Martin Duffy	PTS	20	Feb 26, 1904	Whittington Park, Hot Springs, Arkansas, U.S.	
58	Draw	39–13–6	Dick O'Brien	PTS	10	Dec 19, 1903	Edwards Theater, Parsons, Kansas, U.S.	
57	Loss	39–13–5	Martin Duffy	KO	13 (20)	May 28, 1903	Music Hall, Louisville, Kentucky, U.S.	Lost world white welterweight title claim
56	Win	39–12–5	Matty Matthews	TKO	19 (20)	Apr 27, 1903	International A.C., Fort Erie, Ontario, Canada	Won world white welterweight title claim
55	Loss	38–12–5	Matty Matthews	PTS	10	Dec 22, 1902	Kenyon's Hall, Allegheny, Pennsylvania, U.S.	For vacant world white welterweight title claim
54	Loss	38–11–5	Hugo Kelly	PTS	10	Nov 27, 1902	Delaware Club, Kansas City, Missouri, U.S.	
53	Win	38–10–5	Billy Emerson	PTS	10	Jul 18, 1902	Eureka Springs, Arkansas, U.S.	
52	Win	37–10–5	Owen Ziegler	KO	3 (20)	May 29, 1902	Joplin, Missouri, U.S.	
51	Loss	36–10–5	Al Neill	KO	12 (20)	Mar 21, 1902	Exposition Building, Portland, Oregon, U.S.	
50	Loss	36–9–5	Tom Tracey	PTS	20	Feb 26, 1902	Exposition Building, Portland, Oregon, U.S.	
49	Win	36–8–5	Tim Draffin Murphy	PTS	6	Jan 27, 1902	American A.C., Chicago, Illinois, U.S.	
48	Win	35–8–5	Jack Bennett	KO	2 (6)	Jan 3, 1902	Industrial A.C., Philadelphia, Pennsylvania, U.S.	
47	Loss	34–8–5	Barbados Joe Walcott	TKO	5 (20)	Dec 18, 1901	International A.C., Fort Erie, Ontario, Canada	Lost world welterweight title
46	Win	34–7–5	Charles Dutch Thurston	PTS	15	Nov 28, 1901	Light Guard Armory, Detroit, Michigan, U.S.	Retained world welterweight title
45	Win	33–7–5	Frank Erne	KO	9 (20)	Sep 23, 1901	International A.C., Fort Erie, Ontario, Canada	Retained world welterweight title
44	Win	32–7–5	Matty Matthews	KO	10 (20)	May 24, 1901	Mutual Street Rink, Toronto, Ontario, Canada	Won world welterweight title
43	Loss	31–7–5	Matty Matthews	PTS	15	Oct 16, 1900	Light Guard Armory, Detroit, Michigan, U.S.	Lost world welterweight title
42	Win	31–6–5	Matty Matthews	PTS	15	Aug 30, 1900	Light Guard Armory, Detroit, Michigan, U.S.	Retained world welterweight title
41	Win	30–6–5	Eddie Connolly	TKO	15 (20)	Aug 13, 1900	Olympic A.C., Buffalo, New York, U.S.	Won world welterweight title; Retained world welterweight title claim
40	Win	29–6–5	Joe Reptie	TKO	2 (10)	Jul 19, 1900	Ortner's Hall, Buffalo, New York, U.S.	
39	Win	28–6–5	Otto Knop	KO	4 (10)	Jul 19, 1900	Ortner's Hall, Buffalo, New York, U.S.	
38	Win	27–6–5	Jack Bennett	KO	1 (20)	May 24, 1900	Mutual Street Rink, Toronto, Ontario, Canada	
37	Win	26–6–5	Jack Hanley	KO	7 (20)	Mar 20, 1900	Opera House, Weir, Kansas, U.S.	
36	Win	25–6–5	Mike Donovan	PTS	20	Feb 22, 1900	Hawthorne A.C., Buffalo, New York, U.S.	Retained world welterweight title claim
35	Win	24–6–5	Mysterious Billy Smith	DQ	21 (25)	Jan 15, 1900	Hawthorne A.C., Buffalo, New York, U.S.	Claimed world welterweight title; Ferns claims Smith's title and Smith continues to claim the title also. Smith knocked Ferns down 15 times before fouling him
34	Win	23–6–5	Walter Burgo	KO	2 (15)	Dec 28, 1899	Lake City A.C., Erie, Pennsylvania, U.S.	
33	Win	22–6–5	Sammy Callahan	KO	1 (20)	Nov 30, 1899	Hawthorne A.C., Buffalo, New York, U.S.	
32	Win	21–6–5	Bobby Dobbs	PTS	20	Sep 29, 1899	Hawthorne A.C., Buffalo, New York, U.S.	
31	Loss	20–6–5	Bert Young	TKO	9 (20)	Jul 18, 1899	Aylor's Hall, Webb City, Missouri, U.S.	
30	Win	20–5–5	Shorty Ahearn	KO	6 (?)	Jun 22, 1899	Chicago, Illinois, U.S.	
29	Win	19–5–5	Shorty Ahearn	PTS	6	May 27, 1899	Howard Theater, Chicago, Illinois, U.S.	
28	Win	18–5–5	Otto Mauke	KO	7 (30)	Apr 11, 1899	Scammon, Kansas, U.S.	
27	Draw	17–5–5	Shorty Ahearn	PTS	6	Feb 9, 1899	Calhoun Madison AC, Chicago, Illinois, U.S.	
26	Loss	17–5–4	Charlie McKeever	PTS	6	Feb 7, 1899	Tattersall's, Chicago, Illinois, U.S.	
25	Win	17–4–4	Walter Montgomery	KO	9 (15)	Dec 23, 1898	Chicopee, Kansas, U.S.	
24	Win	16–4–4	Spot Robinson	KO	2 (?)	Dec 23, 1898	U.S.	Exact location unknown
23	Win	15–4–4	Paddy Purtell	KO	5 (20)	Nov 30, 1898	Sapp's Opera House, Galena, Kansas, U.S.	
22	Draw	14–4–4	Ben Smith	PTS	12	Oct 6, 1898	Carnival AC, Kansas City, Kansas, U.S.	
21	Win	14–4–3	George Fitzgerald	KO	3 (?)	Jul 11, 1898	Sapp's Opera House, Galena, Kansas, U.S.	
20	Win	13–4–3	Frank 'Dutch' Neal	KO	8 (20)	Jun 8, 1898	Sapp's Opera House, Galena, Kansas, U.S.	
19	Loss	12–4–3	George Fitzgerald	KO	2 (?)	May 2, 1898	Opera House, Weir, Kansas, U.S.	
18	Win	12–3–3	Frank 'Dutch' Neal	KO	6 (?)	Apr 1, 1898	Sapp's Opera House, Galena, Kansas, U.S.	
17	Win	11–3–3	Billy Emerson	PTS	10	Mar 17, 1898	Springfield, Missouri, U.S.	
16	Win	10–3–3	Hugh McManus	KO	23 (25)	Dec 13, 1897	Opera House, Weir, Kansas, U.S.	
15	Draw	9–3–3	Walter Montgomery	PTS	10	Oct 25, 1897	Weir, Kansas, U.S.	
14	Loss	9–3–2	Bobby Dobbs	PTS	8	Jul 2, 1897	Charter Oak A.C., Hartford, Connecticut, U.S.	
13	Win	9–2–2	Lou DeMonge	KO	8 (10)	Jun 7, 1897	Greenpoint S.C., Brooklyn, New York City, New York, U.S.	
12	Loss	8–2–2	Izzy Strauss	DQ	1 (10)	Jun 4, 1897	Broadway A.C., Brooklyn, New York City, New York, U.S.	
11	Draw	8–1–2	Oscar Gardner	PTS	6	May 10, 1897	Chicopee, Kansas, U.S.	
10	Win	8–1–1	Bill Mahan	KO	6 (?)	Mar 22, 1897	Opera House, Weir, Kansas, U.S.	
9	Draw	7–1–1	Scaldy Bill Quinn	PTS	6	Mar 8, 1897	Frontenac, Kansas, U.S.	
8	Win	7–1	Bill Mahan	TKO	6 (20)	Dec 31, 1896	Opera House, Weir, Kansas, U.S.	
7	Win	6–1	Caswell Whitman	TKO	3 (10)	Dec 22, 1896	Opera House, Weir, Kansas, U.S.	
6	Loss	5–1	Paddy Purtell	KO	3 (10)	Nov 9, 1896	Galena, Kansas, U.S.	
5	Win	5–0	Ed Doyle	TKO	13 (20)	Sep 25, 1896	Opera House, Weir, Kansas, U.S.	
4	Win	4–0	Fred Ross	TKO	13 (?)	Aug 28, 1896	Sapp's Opera House, Galena, Kansas, U.S.	
3	Win	3–0	Harry Pigeon	KO	19 (?)	Jul 29, 1896	Sapp's Opera House, Galena, Kansas, U.S.	
2	Win	2–0	Jack Dougherty	KO	2 (?)	Jul 15, 1896	Mineral City, Kansas, U.S.	
1	Win	1–0	Tom Mackey	TKO	10 (25)	Jun 29, 1896	Opera House, Weir, Kansas, U.S.	

== Unofficial Professional boxing record ==
71 fights	43 wins	18 losses
By knockout	32	9
By decision	10	8
By disqualification	1	1
Draws	10	

Record with the inclusion of Newspaper decisions to the win/loss/draw column.

No.	Result	Record	Opponent	Type	Round	Date	Location	Notes
74	Loss	45–18–11	Wildcat Ferns	TKO	4 (15)	Apr 5, 1910	Auditorium, Oklahoma City, Oklahoma, U.S.	
73	Loss	45–17–11	Kid Farmer	TKO	5 (10)	Sep 27, 1907	Springfield, Illinois, U.S.	
72	Draw	45–16–11	John Dukelow	PTS	10	Dec 19, 1906	Rochester, New York, U.S.	
71	Draw	45–16–10	Charley Sieger	PTS	20	Jun 20, 1906	Lock City A.C., Lockport, New York, U.S.	
70	Win	45–16–9	Art Mason	PTS	15	Jun 1, 1906	Ortner's Hall, Buffalo, New York, U.S.	
69	Win	44–16–9	Charlie Conkle	DQ	3 (10)	May 15, 1906	Lyceum Theater, Niagara Falls, New York, U.S.	
68	Loss	43–16–9	Charley Hitte	DQ	7 (20)	Apr 18, 1906	Albany, New York, U.S.	
67	Draw	43–15–9	Charley Sieger	PTS	15	Mar 21, 1906	Miller's Hall, Buffalo, New York, U.S.	
66	Draw	43–15–8	Mike Donovan	NWS	6	Mar 17, 1906	18th Regiment Armory, Pittsburgh, Pennsylvania, U.S.	
65	Win	43–15–7	Matty Matthews	KO	9 (15)	Mar 16, 1906	International A.C., Buffalo, New York, U.S.	
64	Win	42–15–7	Billy Delaney	KO	4 (15)	Feb 22, 1906	Godfroy's Pavilion, Reed's Lake, Michigan, U.S.	
63	Win	41–15–7	Gus Gardner	NWS	15	Feb 12, 1906	International A.C., Buffalo, New York, U.S.	
62	Loss	40–15–7	Billy Rhodes	TKO	3 (20)	Sep 24, 1905	Island Park, Kansas City, Missouri, U.S.	
61	Draw	40–14–7	Jack Dunleavy	PTS	17	Aug 20, 1905	Island Park, Kansas City, Missouri, U.S.	
60	Win	40–14–6	Eugene Bezenah	NWS	20	Mar 28, 1904	Weir, Kansas, U.S.	
59	Loss	39–14–6	Martin Duffy	PTS	20	Feb 26, 1904	Whittington Park, Hot Springs, Arkansas, U.S.	
58	Draw	39–13–6	Dick O'Brien	PTS	10	Dec 19, 1903	Edwards Theater, Parsons, Kansas, U.S.	
57	Loss	39–13–5	Martin Duffy	KO	13 (20)	May 28, 1903	Music Hall, Louisville, Kentucky, U.S.	Lost world white welterweight title claim
56	Win	39–12–5	Matty Matthews	TKO	19 (20)	Apr 27, 1903	International A.C., Fort Erie, Ontario, Canada	Won world white welterweight title claim
55	Loss	38–12–5	Matty Matthews	PTS	10	Dec 22, 1902	Kenyon's Hall, Allegheny, Pennsylvania, U.S.	For vacant world white welterweight title claim
54	Loss	38–11–5	Hugo Kelly	PTS	10	Nov 27, 1902	Delaware Club, Kansas City, Missouri, U.S.	
53	Win	38–10–5	Billy Emerson	PTS	10	Jul 18, 1902	Eureka Springs, Arkansas, U.S.	
52	Win	37–10–5	Owen Ziegler	KO	3 (20)	May 29, 1902	Joplin, Missouri, U.S.	
51	Loss	36–10–5	Al Neill	KO	12 (20)	Mar 21, 1902	Exposition Building, Portland, Oregon, U.S.	
50	Loss	36–9–5	Tom Tracey	PTS	20	Feb 26, 1902	Exposition Building, Portland, Oregon, U.S.	
49	Win	36–8–5	Tim Draffin Murphy	PTS	6	Jan 27, 1902	American A.C., Chicago, Illinois, U.S.	
48	Win	35–8–5	Jack Bennett	KO	2 (6)	Jan 3, 1902	Industrial A.C., Philadelphia, Pennsylvania, U.S.	
47	Loss	34–8–5	Barbados Joe Walcott	TKO	5 (20)	Dec 18, 1901	International A.C., Fort Erie, Ontario, Canada	Lost world welterweight title
46	Win	34–7–5	Charles Dutch Thurston	PTS	15	Nov 28, 1901	Light Guard Armory, Detroit, Michigan, U.S.	Retained world welterweight title
45	Win	33–7–5	Frank Erne	KO	9 (20)	Sep 23, 1901	International A.C., Fort Erie, Ontario, Canada	Retained world welterweight title
44	Win	32–7–5	Matty Matthews	KO	10 (20)	May 24, 1901	Mutual Street Rink, Toronto, Ontario, Canada	Won world welterweight title
43	Loss	31–7–5	Matty Matthews	PTS	15	Oct 16, 1900	Light Guard Armory, Detroit, Michigan, U.S.	Lost world welterweight title
42	Win	31–6–5	Matty Matthews	PTS	15	Aug 30, 1900	Light Guard Armory, Detroit, Michigan, U.S.	Retained world welterweight title
41	Win	30–6–5	Eddie Connolly	TKO	15 (20)	Aug 13, 1900	Olympic A.C., Buffalo, New York, U.S.	Won world welterweight title; Retained world welterweight title claim
40	Win	29–6–5	Joe Reptie	TKO	2 (10)	Jul 19, 1900	Ortner's Hall, Buffalo, New York, U.S.	
39	Win	28–6–5	Otto Knop	KO	4 (10)	Jul 19, 1900	Ortner's Hall, Buffalo, New York, U.S.	
38	Win	27–6–5	Jack Bennett	KO	1 (20)	May 24, 1900	Mutual Street Rink, Toronto, Ontario, Canada	
37	Win	26–6–5	Jack Hanley	KO	7 (20)	Mar 20, 1900	Opera House, Weir, Kansas, U.S.	
36	Win	25–6–5	Mike Donovan	PTS	20	Feb 22, 1900	Hawthorne A.C., Buffalo, New York, U.S.	Retained world welterweight title claim
35	Win	24–6–5	Mysterious Billy Smith	DQ	21 (25)	Jan 15, 1900	Hawthorne A.C., Buffalo, New York, U.S.	Claimed world welterweight title; Ferns claims Smith's title and Smith continues to claim the title also. Smith knocked Ferns down 15 times before fouling him
34	Win	23–6–5	Walter Burgo	KO	2 (15)	Dec 28, 1899	Lake City A.C., Erie, Pennsylvania, U.S.	
33	Win	22–6–5	Sammy Callahan	KO	1 (20)	Nov 30, 1899	Hawthorne A.C., Buffalo, New York, U.S.	
32	Win	21–6–5	Bobby Dobbs	PTS	20	Sep 29, 1899	Hawthorne A.C., Buffalo, New York, U.S.	
31	Loss	20–6–5	Bert Young	TKO	9 (20)	Jul 18, 1899	Aylor's Hall, Webb City, Missouri, U.S.	
30	Win	20–5–5	Shorty Ahearn	KO	6 (?)	Jun 22, 1899	Chicago, Illinois, U.S.	
29	Win	19–5–5	Shorty Ahearn	PTS	6	May 27, 1899	Howard Theater, Chicago, Illinois, U.S.	
28	Win	18–5–5	Otto Mauke	KO	7 (30)	Apr 11, 1899	Scammon, Kansas, U.S.	
27	Draw	17–5–5	Shorty Ahearn	PTS	6	Feb 9, 1899	Calhoun Madison AC, Chicago, Illinois, U.S.	
26	Loss	17–5–4	Charlie McKeever	PTS	6	Feb 7, 1899	Tattersall's, Chicago, Illinois, U.S.	
25	Win	17–4–4	Walter Montgomery	KO	9 (15)	Dec 23, 1898	Chicopee, Kansas, U.S.	
24	Win	16–4–4	Spot Robinson	KO	2 (?)	Dec 23, 1898	U.S.	Exact location unknown
23	Win	15–4–4	Paddy Purtell	KO	5 (20)	Nov 30, 1898	Sapp's Opera House, Galena, Kansas, U.S.	
22	Draw	14–4–4	Ben Smith	PTS	12	Oct 6, 1898	Carnival AC, Kansas City, Kansas, U.S.	
21	Win	14–4–3	George Fitzgerald	KO	3 (?)	Jul 11, 1898	Sapp's Opera House, Galena, Kansas, U.S.	
20	Win	13–4–3	Frank 'Dutch' Neal	KO	8 (20)	Jun 8, 1898	Sapp's Opera House, Galena, Kansas, U.S.	
19	Loss	12–4–3	George Fitzgerald	KO	2 (?)	May 2, 1898	Opera House, Weir, Kansas, U.S.	
18	Win	12–3–3	Frank 'Dutch' Neal	KO	6 (?)	Apr 1, 1898	Sapp's Opera House, Galena, Kansas, U.S.	
17	Win	11–3–3	Billy Emerson	PTS	10	Mar 17, 1898	Springfield, Missouri, U.S.	
16	Win	10–3–3	Hugh McManus	KO	23 (25)	Dec 13, 1897	Opera House, Weir, Kansas, U.S.	
15	Draw	9–3–3	Walter Montgomery	PTS	10	Oct 25, 1897	Weir, Kansas, U.S.	
14	Loss	9–3–2	Bobby Dobbs	PTS	8	Jul 2, 1897	Charter Oak A.C., Hartford, Connecticut, U.S.	
13	Win	9–2–2	Lou DeMonge	KO	8 (10)	Jun 7, 1897	Greenpoint S.C., Brooklyn, New York City, New York, U.S.	
12	Loss	8–2–2	Izzy Strauss	DQ	1 (10)	Jun 4, 1897	Broadway A.C., Brooklyn, New York City, New York, U.S.	
11	Draw	8–1–2	Oscar Gardner	PTS	6	May 10, 1897	Chicopee, Kansas, U.S.	
10	Win	8–1–1	Bill Mahan	KO	6 (?)	Mar 22, 1897	Opera House, Weir, Kansas, U.S.	
9	Draw	7–1–1	Scaldy Bill Quinn	PTS	6	Mar 8, 1897	Frontenac, Kansas, U.S.	
8	Win	7–1	Bill Mahan	TKO	6 (20)	Dec 31, 1896	Opera House, Weir, Kansas, U.S.	
7	Win	6–1	Caswell Whitman	TKO	3 (10)	Dec 22, 1896	Opera House, Weir, Kansas, U.S.	
6	Loss	5–1	Paddy Purtell	KO	3 (10)	Nov 9, 1896	Galena, Kansas, U.S.	
5	Win	5–0	Ed Doyle	TKO	13 (20)	Sep 25, 1896	Opera House, Weir, Kansas, U.S.	
4	Win	4–0	Fred Ross	TKO	13 (?)	Aug 28, 1896	Sapp's Opera House, Galena, Kansas, U.S.	
3	Win	3–0	Harry Pigeon	KO	19 (?)	Jul 29, 1896	Sapp's Opera House, Galena, Kansas, U.S.	
2	Win	2–0	Jack Dougherty	KO	2 (?)	Jul 15, 1896	Mineral City, Kansas, U.S.	
1	Win	1–0	Tom Mackey	TKO	10 (25)	Jun 29, 1896	Opera House, Weir, Kansas, U.S.	

Achievements
Preceded by Eddie Connolly	World Welterweight Championship; August 13, 1900 – October 16, 1900	Succeeded by William "Matty" Matthews
Preceded by William "Matty" Matthews	World Welterweight Championship; May 24, 1901 – December 18, 1901	Succeeded by Joe Walcott

== See also ==
- Lineal championship
- List of welterweight boxing champions
