= Andy Bowen =

American boxer

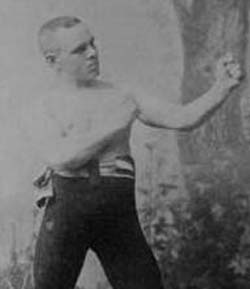

Personal information
- Nationality: (United States) American
- Born: Andy Bowen; May 3, 1867 New Orleans, Louisiana, U.S.
- Died: December 15, 1894 (aged 27) New Orleans, Louisiana, U.S.
- Height: 5 ft 6 in (168 cm)
- Weight: Lightweight

Boxing career
- Stance: Orthodox

Boxing record
- Total fights: 27
- Wins: 16
- Win by KO: 7
- Losses: 3
- Draws: 7
- No contests: 1

Andy Bowen (May 3, 1867 – December 15, 1894) was an American lightweight boxer best known for fighting the world's longest boxing match, which took place in 1893 against Jack Burke.

== Biography ==
=== Early life ===
Born on May 3, 1867, in New Orleans, Louisiana, Bowen's first fight was in 1887. He was undefeated in his first 14 fights, with 12 wins and two draws. In September 1890, he successfully defended his title against Jimmy Carroll at the Olympic Club in New Orleans (the same club where James J. Corbett would defeat John L. Sullivan for the World Heavyweight Championship two years later).

=== The longest fight ===
On April 6, 1893, Bowen and Jack Burke fought the longest fight in history. Bowen had originally scheduled the fight with another opponent, however after dropping out of the fight, Jack Burke, who was the latter's trainer, fought the bout instead. The fight took place at the same Olympics Club Bowen had defended his title from Carroll. The fight lasted 110 rounds over seven hours and 19 minutes (each round lasting three minutes). It was reported that the fight went on for so long, that the spectators who stayed to watch the fight had fallen asleep in their seats. It was also recorded that at round 108, with no clear end in sight, referee John Duffy made the decision that if no winner had emerged in the next 2 rounds, the bout would be ruled a "no contest". With both men having become too dazed and tired to come out of their corners, Duffy declared the match a no contest. Burke broke all the bones in both of his hands and was bedridden for six weeks. He had considered retiring after the fight but chose to continue competing. Bowen fought four more times after the fight. The club where the fight took place would burn to the ground four years later.

=== Last fight and death ===
Bowen's fight against Kid Lavigne was his 27th and last fight. The injury that killed him was inflicted in the 18th round, when Lavigne knocked him down and he hit his head on the wooden canvas. Bowen never regained consciousness and died at 7:00 am the next morning, aged 27. At first Lavigne was arrested for Bowen's death, but was found to be innocent of any wrongdoing following a coroner's inquest. Bowen's death was listed as from hitting his head on the ring floor.

== Professional boxing record ==
26 fights	15 wins	4 losses
By knockout	7	3
By decision	8	1
Draws	5	
No contests	2	

No.	Result	Record	Opponent	Type	Round, time	Date	Location	Notes
26	Loss	15–4–5 (2)	George Lavigne	KO	18 (25)	Dec 14, 1894	Olympic Club, New Orleans, Louisiana, U.S.	Bowen died of injuries sustained from the fight
25	Draw	15–3–5 (2)	Jim Carroll	RTD	25	Aug 8, 1894	Auditorium Club, New Orleans, Louisiana, U.S.	
24	Draw	15–3–4 (2)	Stanton Abbott	RTD	10	May 7, 1894	Olympic Club, New Orleans, Louisiana, U.S.	
23	Win	15–3–3 (2)	Jack Everhardt	RTD	85	May 31, 1893	Olympic Club, New Orleans, Louisiana, U.S.	
22	NC	14–3–3 (2)	Jack Burke	NC	110 (?)	Apr 6, 1893	Olympic Club, New Orleans, Louisiana, U.S.	This is the longest glove fight on record, lasting 7 hours and 20 minutes. The bout was called a 'no contest' by the referee after 110 rounds.
21	Win	14–3–3 (1)	Joe Fielden	KO	22 (?)	Jan 5, 1893	Crescent City A.C., New Orleans, Louisiana, U.S.	
20	Win	13–3–3 (1)	Johnny Eckert	KO	18 (?)	Oct 23, 1892	Plaquemine, U.S.	
19	NC	12–3–3 (1)	Jimmy Murphy	NC	8	Feb 18, 1892	Chicago, U.S.	Overturned as no such bout was mentioned in Feb 19 Daily Inter Ocean.
18	Loss	12–3–3	Austin Gibbons	TKO	48 (?)	Dec 29, 1891	Metropolitan A.C., New Orleans, Louisiana, U.S.	
17	Draw	12–2–3	Billy Myer	TD	2	May 20, 1891	New Orleans, Louisiana, U.S.	
16	Draw	12–2–2	Billy Myer	PTS	24	May 19, 1891	Olympic Club, New Orleans, Louisiana, U.S.	
15	Loss	12–2–1	Jim Carroll	KO	21 (?)	Sep 16, 1890	Olympic Club, New Orleans, Louisiana, U.S.	
14	Win	12–1–1	Billy Myer	PTS	28	May 22, 1890	West End Athletic Club, New Orleans, Louisiana, U.S.	
13	Loss	11–1–1	Charley Johnson	PTS	43 (?)	Feb 9, 1890	Abita Springs, U.S.	
12	Win	11–0–1	Louis Bezenah	PTS	4	Jan 31, 1890	Southern A.C., New Orleans, Louisiana, U.S.	
11	Win	10–0–1	Jimmy McHale	KO	2 (?)	Dec 22, 1889	Southern A.C., New Orleans, Louisiana, U.S.	
10	Win	9–0–1	Tom Ryan	TKO	3 (5)	Aug 4, 1889	Sportsman's Park, New Orleans, Louisiana, U.S.	
9	Win	8–0–1	Joe Oliver	PTS	10	June 16, 1889	Sportsman's Park, New Orleans, Louisiana, U.S.	
8	Win	7–0–1	Charles Wilson	KO	3 (?)	May 19, 1889	New Orleans, Louisiana, U.S.	
7	Win	6–0–1	Mike Murray	PTS	10	July 1, 1887	New Orleans, Louisiana, U.S.	
6	Win	5–0–1	Skinner Norton	PTS	2	June 1, 1887	New Orleans, Louisiana, U.S.	
5	Win	4–0–1	Jack Doyle	PTS	5	May 1, 1887	New Orleans, Louisiana, U.S.	
4	Win	3–0–1	Frank Penti	PTS	7	Apr 1, 1887	New Orleans, Louisiana, U.S.	
3	Win	2–0–1	Johnny Wilson	PTS	3	Mar 1, 1887	New Orleans, Louisiana, U.S.	
2	Win	1–0–1	Mike Murphy	PTS	2	Feb 1, 1887	New Orleans, Louisiana, U.S.	
1	Draw	0–0–1	Jim Glass	PTS	10	Jan 16, 1887	Park Hotel, New Orleans, Louisiana, U.S.	
