= Mysterious Billy Smith =

Canadian boxer

Personal information
- Nickname: "Mysterious Billy" Smith
- Born: William Amos Smith; May 15, 1871 Little River, Digby, Nova Scotia, Canada
- Died: October 15, 1937 (aged 66) Portland, Oregon, US
- Height: 5 ft 8 1/2 in (174 cm)
- Weight: Welterweight

Boxing career

Boxing record
- Total fights: 94
- Wins: 37
- Win by KO: 24
- Losses: 25
- Draws: 27
- No contests: 5

William Amos Smith (May 15, 1871 – October 15, 1937) (Aka "Mysterious Billy" Smith) was a Canadian born two-time world welterweight boxing champion of the world: first at age 21 in 1892, then again in 1898 at the age of 27. He became famous world-wide for his boxing success and also became infamous for his associations and involvement with criminal activities in Portland, Oregon, in the early 1900s. He was later described as the "Dirtiest fighter of all Time". Smith died at the age of 66 on October 15, 1937, and was buried at Multnomah Park Cemetery in Portland Oregon.

He was posthumously inducted into the International Boxing Hall of Fame in the class of 2009.

== Early life ==
William Amos Smith was born in Little River, Digby, Nova Scotia, Canada, on May 15, 1871, to Robert James Smith (1831-1895) and Adelia Dakin (1838-1902). William was the sixth and last child born to this family. His father was a fisherman who was born in the USA. William had three older brothers (Nelson Wentworth Smith, St Clair Smith and Thomas Dakin Smith) and two sisters (Elizabeth and Adelaide Smith).

William was first documented at age 10 on the 1881 Canadian census in Lepreau, New Brunswick, Canada, with his entire family. He was listed by his middle name (Amos) and as being born in Nova Scotia.

William's older brother Thomas Dakin Smith moved from the East Coast to the state of Oregon in late 1887. Thomas married Mary Elizabeth Beech in 1888 in Benton County, Oregon. Thomas then moved to Portland, Oregon, and was listed in an 1894 city directory, and again in the 1900 census. In both references Thomas was employed as a buggy washer. By moving to Portland, Thomas created a familial anchor base that his younger brother William would use when he pursued his boxing career from Canada to San Francisco to Portland, Oregon.

Meanwhile, back in Canada, 19-year-old William found early success in boxing. Amos William Smith fought Ed Harvey to a draw on December 1, 1890, in Saint John, New Brunswick, Canada. His manager at this time was his second eldest brother St. Claire Smith. William also beat Frank Tebeau by TK in 5 rounds.

== Career ==
=== 1891 San Francisco, California ===
In early 1891 (age 19), William Amos Smith traveled from the East Coast (Canada/USA) to San Francisco, California, to pursue his boxing career.

In 1891, William Amos Smith fought and beat a man named Breslin. (need citation).

He boxed at the following venues in San Francisco from January 20, 1892, to March 21, 1892:

California Athletic Club - San Francisco
Wigwam Theatre - San Francisco
Occidental Athletic Club - San Francisco

William fought two exhibition matches against older established boxers.

His first fight was against John Edward Kelly, aka Jack Dempsey, aka Nonpareil Dempsey, who was 9 years older than William Amos Smith and a weight class above him. Dempsey was the first holder of the world middleweight championship from 1884 to 1891.

William then fought an exhibition match against the Australian boxer called Billy "Shadow" Maber. .

Exhibition matches sold tickets, which in turn provided money for all involved. These matches were marketed to create excitement and show the young up-and-coming boxer William Amos Smith was able to challenge established, aging boxers.

On January 1, 1892, William Amos Smith (age 20), beat Billy Kelly on points at the California Athletic Club.

On January 27, 1892, he lost to Frank Purcell on points at the California Athletic Club, San Francisco.

On February 16, 1892, he beat Frank Kelley by KO at the Wigwam Theatre.

On March 21, 1892, he beat Billy Armstrong by KO at the Occidental Athletic Club, San Francisco.

=== 1892 Portland Oregon ===
In 1892, William was 20 years old. His older brother Thomas Dakin Smith, age 23, had previously moved from Canada to Portland, Oregon, and was living there since 1887.

On February 27, 1892, the Sacramento newspaper "The Record-Union" listed welterweight boxers in San Francisco, including "Billy Smith" of Australia, " Billy Smith" of Boston and George Lavigaine (sic: Lavigne).

On April 9, 1892, William traveled by steamship from San Francisco to Portland, Oregon, with another boxer named George "Kid" Lavigne.

Kid Lavigne was three years older than William and fought in the lightweight division. Lavigne and Smith became friends, and both later traveled to London in 1896 to box.

On April 28, 1892, William fought Tommy West to a draw at the Portland Oregon Pastime Athletic Club.

On June 29, 1892, William beat Charles Gleason by TKO at the Portland, Oregon, Pastime Athletic Club. Charles Gleason was an established boxer with a record of 20 wins, 9 losses and 6 draws.

=== 1892 Wins World Welterweight Title: Gets Fame and Nickname "Mysterious" Billy Smith ===
On September 20, 1892, William beat Billy (Shadow) Maber by KO at the Pastime Athletic Club in Portland, Oregon.

On December 14, 1892, the San Francisco newspaper, The Morning Call, published and previewed and upcoming fight between Billy Smith of Oregon and Danny Needham of Oakland. This story was likely written the day before or on the morning on December 14. According to the article, the fight was to be held at the Pacific Club.

William "Billy" Smith won the fight vs Danny Needham.

He just won the World Welterweight Boxing Title in San Francisco. Smith claimed he was from Boston. East Coast reporters didn't know him as boxer in their area. To them he was a "Mystery" The name stuck and William Amos Smith adopted it. From that time forward, William Amos Smith was known in newspapers as "Mysterious" Billy Smith, "Mysterious Billy" Smith, Billy Smith, and William Amos Smith. He is not to be confused with another boxer around this time named "Australian Billy Smith".

=== 1894 Loses the World Welterweight boxing title ===
On July 26, 1894, William, age 23, Lost the World Welterweight boxing title to Tommy Ryan at the Twin City Athletic Club in Minneapolis, MN by points.

=== 1896 Boxes in London, England ===
At age 24, William, aka "Mysterious" Billy Smith traveled to London to fight welterweight boxers that London had to offer. Joining him was his friend George "Kid" Lavigne a lightweight boxer also out of Portland Oregon.

On March 5, 1896, William fought three boxers on the same day and beat them all: Trooper Ham, Jack Bryan and Arthur Morris at Tottenham Court at Road Store Street Hall. He won two by KO and won the 3rd by a DQ from Arthur Morris.

On March 30, 1896, William "Billy" fought Bill Husbands at the National Sporting Club, Covent Garden. Billy won by TKO.

The William Schutte boxing pamphlet has a front-page photo of William in a dark suit with a tall stove-type that was taken at this time. A descendant of William Amos Smith has an original photo.

=== 1898 Wins World Welterweight boxing title for the second time ===
On August 25, 1898, William (age 27) Won the World Welterweight boxing title for the second time vs William 'Matty' Matthews at the Lennox Athletic Club in New York and won by points.

On June 6, 1900, William (age 29) and Mary were listed on the 1900 Census. William was listed as an actor

=== 1901 Lost the World Welterweight boxing title for the second time ===
On January 15, 1901, William Lost the World Welterweight boxing title for the second time vs James "Rube" Ferns at the Hawthorne A.C., Buffalo, New York. Smith knocked down Ferns 15 times before he was disqualified for fouling.

On November 30, 1901, Mysterious Billy Smith was back in Portland Oregon. He and (future in-law) Charles Jost boxed the same night on different bouts.

Charles Albert Jost aka "Charley Jost/Yost", boxed under the alias as "Young Fritz"

On October 25, 1902, Charles Jost won the Eastern Oregon boxing middleweight championship against James Lavigne.

== Marriages ==
=== 1892 First Marriage: Minnie Valentine Merchant ===
On July 12, 1892, at age 21, William Amos Smith married Minnie Valentine Merchant age 17 in Clark County, Washington (aka Vancouver, WA).

She was a 17 year old Presbyterian daughter of Sarah Elizabeth Merchant and Joseph Milton Merchant. Joseph Merchant started out as a carpenter who became wealthy in the Portland through his construction business. They all lived in East Portland, Oregon, yet, William and Minnie went across state to Washington in order to get married. Minnie's mother, Sarah Elizabeth Merchant was listed on the marriage license in Clark County WA.

On May 11, 1893, his 18-year-old wife, Minnie V Merchant-Smith, died of food or blood poisoning in Lynn, Essex, Massachusetts.

=== 1898 Second Marriage: Mary Maime Cavanagh ===
On July 9, 1898, age 27, William married Mary "Maime" Cavanagh in College Point, Queens, New York, USA. He was age 27 and she was age 22. She was a daughter of David Cavanagh and Ann Kennedy. "Maime" Cavanaugh-Smith divorced William Smith on June 7, 1907.

=== 1907 Third Marriage ===
On June 8, 1907, the day after his divorce, he married Josephine Hoffstatter-Barde in Oregon City.

== Boxing ==
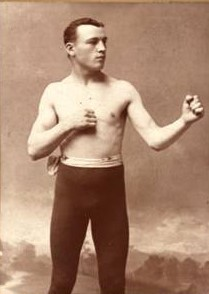
Portrait of Smith

Smith turned pro in 1890 and in his ninth fight, he knocked out Danny Needham to win the World welterweight championship in 1892. He held on to it until Tommy Ryan beat him on points in 1894. He won back the vacant title in 1898 by beating Matty Matthews, and lost it again in 1900 to Rube Ferns. Smith bowed out in 1915 when stopped by Jack Root. During his career, Smith scored wins over Young Peter Jackson, Hall of Famers “Barbados” Joe Walcott and George “Kid” Lavigne.

Smith died at the age of 66 in Portland, Oregon, where he ran a saloon called “The Champion's Rest.”

He was posthumously inducted into the International Boxing Hall of Fame in 2009.

== Fighting style ==
Standing 5' 8 ½”, Smith was a talented two-fisted battler with quick hands who entered the ring ready to wage war. He often displayed a blatant disregard for the rules, resorting to a variety of foul tactics including but not limited to elbows, butts, knees and sometimes even biting. Smith was notorious for having a very roughhouse fighting style in the ring and was disqualified 13 times, more than any other boxer in history. His tactics earned him the label as “The Dirtiest Fighter Who Ever Lived.”

== Professional boxing record ==
All information in this section is derived from BoxRec, unless otherwise stated.

=== Official record ===
94 fights	35 wins	22 losses
By knockout	24	8
By decision	10	2
By disqualification	1	12
Draws	26	
No contests	5	
Newspaper decisions/draws	6	

All newspaper decisions are officially regarded as “no decision” bouts and are not counted in the win/loss/draw column.

No.	Result	Record	Opponent	Type	Round	Date	Location	Notes
94	Loss	35–22–26 (11)	Jack Root	TKO	6 (6)	Dec 29, 1915	Rose City A.C., Portland, Oregon, U.S.	
93	Loss	35–21–26 (11)	Jim Cameron	DQ	3 (4)	Jul 21, 1911	Dreamland Rink, San Francisco, California, U.S.	Smith was disqualified for wrestling and holding
92	Win	35–20–26 (11)	Al Neill	PTS	10	Jun 10, 1910	Exposition Rink, Saint Johns, Oregon, U.S.	
91	Loss	34–20–26 (11)	Barbados Joe Walcott	TKO	4 (20)	May 28, 1903	Exposition Building, Portland, Oregon, U.S.	
90	Loss	34–19–26 (11)	Tommy Ryan	KO	4 (20)	Mar 14, 1902	Turner Hall, Kansas City, Missouri, U.S.	
89	Loss	34–18–26 (11)	Al Neill	DQ	10 (20)	Jan 23, 1902	Pastime A.C., Portland, Oregon, U.S.	Smith kicked Neill, then bit him on the shoulder
88	Draw	34–17–26 (11)	Al Neill	PTS	20	Nov 29, 1901	Exposition Building, Portland, Oregon, U.S.	
87	Draw	34–17–25 (11)	Tom Tracey	PTS	20	Oct 25, 1901	Exposition Building, Portland, Oregon, U.S.	
86	Draw	34–17–24 (11)	George Byers	PTS	15	Aug 19, 1901	Victoria Rink, Saint John, New Brunswick, Canada	
85	Loss	34–17–23 (11)	Young Peter Jackson	TKO	2 (?)	Jun 14, 1901	Germania Maennerchor Hall, Baltimore, Maryland, U.S.	
84	Draw	34–16–23 (11)	Tim Hurley	PTS	20	Mar 21, 1901	Opera House, New London, Connecticut, U.S.	
83	Draw	34–16–22 (11)	Owen Ziegler	PTS	10 (20)	Feb 12, 1901	Lake City A.C., Erie, Pennsylvania, U.S.	The bout was stopped in 10th by deputy sheriff, and called a draw
82	NC	34–16–21 (11)	Jack Mahoney	NC	11 (?)	Dec 27, 1900	Paterson, New Jersey, U.S.	
81	Draw	34–16–21 (10)	Professor Mike Donovan	PTS	20	Nov 22, 1900	Metropolitan A.C., Wheeling, West Virginia, U.S.	
80	Loss	34–16–20 (10)	Jim Judge	DQ	11 (?)	Nov 14, 1900	Savannah, Georgia, U.S.	
79	Loss	34–15–20 (10)	Barbados Joe Walcott	DQ	10 (20)	Sep 24, 1900	Coliseum, Hartford, Connecticut, U.S.	
78	Win	34–14–20 (10)	Young Peter Jackson	TKO	18 (?)	Sep 11, 1900	Cleveland, Ohio, U.S.	Police intervened to save Jackson from further punishment
77	Loss	33–14–20 (10)	Jimmy Handler	PTS	25	Jun 29, 1900	Broadway A.C., Manhattan, New York City, New York, U.S.	
76	Loss	33–13–20 (10)	Barbados Joe Walcott	PTS	25	May 4, 1900	Broadway A.C., Manhattan, New York City, New York, U.S.	
75	Loss	33–12–20 (10)	Matty Matthews	KO	19 (25)	Apr 17, 1900	Broadway A.C., Manhattan, New York City, New York, U.S.	Lost world welterweight title
74	Draw	33–11–20 (10)	Jack Mahoney	PTS	25	Mar 12, 1900	Hercules A.C., Brooklyn, New York City, New York, U.S.	Retained world welterweight title
73	Win	33–11–19 (10)	Frank McConnell	DQ	21 (25)	Jan 26, 1900	Broadway A.C., Manhattan, New York City, New York, U.S.	Retained world welterweight title
72	Loss	32–11–19 (10)	Rube Ferns	DQ	21 (25)	Jan 15, 1900	Hawthorne A.C., Buffalo, New York, U.S.	World welterweight title; Smith knocked Ferns down 15 times before fouling him Both men claimed the championship afterwards
71	Win	32–10–19 (10)	Charlie McKeever	PTS	20	Nov 8, 1899	Broadway A.C., Brooklyn, New York City, New York, U.S.	Retained world welterweight title
70	Loss	31–10–19 (10)	Charlie McKeever	NWS	6	Oct 20, 1899	Industrial Hall, Philadelphia, Pennsylvania, U.S.	
69	Draw	31–10–19 (9)	Billy Stift	PTS	6	Sep 29, 1899	Star Theatre, Chicago, Illinois, U.S.	
68	Win	31–10–18 (9)	Bob Douglass	KO	4 (20)	Sep 25, 1899	Olympic A.C., Denver, Colorado, U.S.	
67	Draw	30–10–18 (9)	Andy Walsh	PTS	25	Aug 4, 1899	Broadway A.C., Brooklyn, New York City, New York, U.S.	
66	Win	30–10–17 (9)	Young Bailey	NWS	4 (?)	Jul 31, 1899	Broadway A.C., Philadelphia, Pennsylvania, U.S.	
65	Draw	30–10–17 (8)	Jack Mahoney	NWS	6	Jul 28, 1899	Industrial Hall, Philadelphia, Pennsylvania, U.S.	
64	Draw	30–10–17 (7)	Charlie McKeever	PTS	20	Jun 30, 1899	Broadway A.C., Manhattan, New York City, New York, U.S.	
63	Win	30–10–16 (7)	George Lavigne	KO	14 (20)	Mar 10, 1899	Woodward's Pavilion, San Francisco, California, U.S.	Retained world welterweight title; Won vacant American welterweight title
62	Win	29–10–16 (7)	Australian Billy Edwards	KO	14 (20)	Jan 24, 1899	Lenox A.C., Manhattan, New York City, New York, U.S.	
61	Win	28–10–16 (7)	Barbados Joe Walcott	PTS	20	Dec 6, 1898	Lenox A.C., Manhattan, New York City, New York, U.S.	Retained world welterweight title
60	Draw	27–10–16 (7)	Tommy West	PTS	20	Nov 14, 1898	Horizon A.C., Bridgeport, Connecticut, U.S.	
59	Win	27–10–15 (7)	Charlie McKeever	PTS	25	Oct 7, 1898	Lenox A.C., Manhattan, New York City, New York, U.S.	Retained world welterweight title
58	Win	26–10–15 (7)	Jim Judge	KO	20 (20)	Oct 3, 1898	American S.C., Scranton, Pennsylvania, U.S.	
57	Draw	25–10–15 (7)	Andy Walsh	PTS	25	Sep 5, 1898	Greater New York A.C., Coney Island, New York, U.S.	
56	Win	25–10–14 (7)	Matty Matthews	PTS	25	Aug 25, 1898	Lenox A.C., Manhattan, New York City, New York, U.S.	Won vacant world welterweight title
55	Win	24–10–14 (7)	George "Young Corbett" Green	PTS	25	Jul 29, 1898	Lenox A.C., Manhattan, New York City, New York, U.S.	
54	Draw	23–10–14 (7)	Andy Walsh	PTS	15	Jun 25, 1898	Greater New York A.C., Brooklyn, New York City, New York, U.S.	
53	Loss	23–10–13 (7)	Billy Stift	DQ	5 (6)	Jun 3, 1898	Tattersall's, Chicago, Illinois, U.S.	
52	Draw	23–9–13 (7)	Charley Johnson	PTS	15	May 23, 1898	Olympic A.C., Athens, Pennsylvania, U.S.	
51	Loss	23–9–12 (7)	Tim Callahan	NWS	6	Apr 22, 1898	Arena A.C., Philadelphia, Pennsylvania, U.S.	
50	Draw	23–9–12 (6)	Barbados Joe Walcott	PTS	25	Apr 14, 1898	Park City Theater, Bridgeport, Connecticut, U.S.	
49	Draw	23–9–11 (6)	Abe Ullman	PTS	8	Feb 18, 1898	Germania Maennerchor Hall, Baltimore, Maryland, U.S.	
48	Loss	23–9–10 (6)	Charley Johnson	DQ	1 (?)	Jan 28, 1898	Arena A.C., Philadelphia, Pennsylvania, U.S.	
47	Win	23–8–10 (6)	Johnny Gorman	DQ	5 (?)	Dec 13, 1897	Park City Theater, Bridgeport, Connecticut, U.S.	Gorman was disqualified for wrestling
46	Win	22–8–10 (6)	Billy Mulligan	TKO	2 (?)	Dec 6, 1897	Yonkers, New York, U.S.	
45	Loss	21–8–10 (6)	Jack Bonner	NWS	6	Oct 11, 1897	Quaker City A.C., Philadelphia, Pennsylvania, U.S.	
44	Win	21–8–10 (5)	Jack Howard	TKO	9 (?)	Sep 17, 1897	Clarendon A.C., Manhattan, New York City, New York, U.S.	
43	Win	20–8–10 (5)	Mike Dempsey	TKO	2 (10)	Sep 6, 1897	Greenpoint S.C., Brooklyn, New York City, New York, U.S.	
42	Draw	19–8–10 (5)	Jack Powers	PTS	8	Aug 23, 1897	Saint John, New Brunswick, Canada	
41	Loss	19–8–9 (5)	Jack Bonner	KO	5 (6)	Jun 8, 1897	Olympic A.C., Athens, Pennsylvania, U.S.	
40	Win	19–7–9 (5)	Abe Ullman	PTS	20	May 29, 1897	Polo A.C., Manhattan, New York City, New York, U.S.	
39	Loss	18–7–9 (5)	George "Young Corbett" Green	TKO	12 (?)	Mar 17, 1897	The Race Track Arena, Carson City, Nevada, U.S.	For vacant world welterweight title claim
38	Draw	18–6–9 (5)	Con Doyle	PTS	12	Jan 9, 1897	Polo A.C., Manhattan, New York City, New York, U.S.	
37	Loss	18–6–8 (5)	Tommy Ryan	DQ	9 (20)	Nov 25, 1896	Empire A.C., Maspeth, Queens, New York City, New York, U.S.	
36	Loss	18–5–8 (5)	Australian Jim Ryan	DQ	7 (10)	Sep 4, 1896	Astoria, Oregon, U.S.	Ryan lost his footing and went down and Smith landed a blow while he was down
35	NC	18–4–8 (5)	Billy Gallagher	NC	1 (10)	Jul 2, 1896	Occidental A.C., San Francisco, California, U.S.	Police stopped the fight when it got too wild
34	Loss	18–4–8 (4)	Charles Kid McCoy	DQ	6 (15)	May 18, 1896	Newton Street Armory, Boston, Massachusetts, U.S.	For world middleweight title
33	Win	18–3–8 (4)	Bill Husbands	TKO	8 (8)	Mar 30, 1896	National Sporting Club, Covent Garden, London, England, U.K.	
32	Win	17–3–8 (4)	Trooper Ham	KO	1 (3)	Mar 5, 1896	Store Street Hall, Tottenham Court Road, Westminster, London, England, U.K.	
31	Win	16–3–8 (4)	Jack Bryan	KO	1 (3)	Mar 5, 1896	Store Street Hall, Tottenham Court Road, Westminster, London, England, U.K.	
30	Win	15–3–8 (4)	Arthur Morris	DQ	1 (?)	Mar 5, 1896	Store Street Hall, Tottenham Court Road, Westminster, London, England, U.K.	
29	Win	14–3–8 (4)	Pat Kehoe	TKO	1 (?)	Jan 15, 1896	Auditorium, Hartford, Connecticut, U.S.	
28	ND	13–3–8 (4)	Tom Cawley	ND	6	Dec 27, 1895	Alhambra, Syracuse, New York, U.S.	
27	Draw	13–3–8 (3)	Tommy Ryan	PTS	18 (25)	May 27, 1895	Sea Side A.C., Coney Island, New York, U.S.	For world welterweight title; Stopped when the police intervened, with Smith hanging helpless on the ropes
26	ND	13–3–7 (3)	Jimmy Mann	ND	4	Apr 1, 1895	Atlantic City, New Jersey, U.S.	
25	Win	13–3–7 (2)	Ed Vaughn	TKO	4 (4)	Mar 14, 1895	Front Street Theater, Baltimore, Maryland, U.S.	
24	Win	12–3–7 (2)	Young Hagen	TKO	4 (?)	Mar 5, 1895	Philadelphia, Pennsylvania, U.S.	
23	Draw	11–3–7 (2)	Barbados Joe Walcott	PTS	15	Mar 1, 1895	Music Hall, Boston, Massachusetts, U.S.	Reported for the 140lbs Championship of America
22	ND	11–3–6 (2)	Peter Maher	ND	3	Feb 13, 1895	Lynn, Massachusetts, U.S.	
21	Win	11–3–6 (1)	Harry Gallagher	NWS	4	Feb 1, 1895	Caledonian A.C., Philadelphia, Pennsylvania, U.S.	
20	Draw	11–3–6	Jack Powers	PTS	6	Nov 19, 1894	Saint John, New Brunswick, Canada	
19	Draw	11–3–5	Dick O'Brien	PTS	10	Oct 29, 1894	Lafayette A.C., Boston, Massachusetts, U.S.	
18	Loss	11–3–4	Mayo	KO	? (?)	Aug 17, 1894	Pentwater, Michigan, U.S.	
17	Loss	11–2–4	Tommy Ryan	PTS	20	Jul 26, 1894	Twin City A.C., Minneapolis, Minnesota, U.S.	Lost world welterweight title claim; For world welterweight title
16	Win	11–1–4	Eddie Butler	TKO	2 (?)	May 15, 1894	Spring Valley, Illinois, U.S.	
15	Win	10–1–4	Fletcher Robbins	TKO	4 (?)	Feb 19, 1894	Streator, California, U.S.	The police stopped the fight
14	Draw	9–1–4	Tommy Ryan	PTS	6	Jan 9, 1894	Casino, Boston, Massachusetts, U.S.	
13	Win	9–1–3	Billy McCarthy	PTS	6	Sep 20, 1893	2nd Regiment Armory, Chicago, Illinois, U.S.	
12	Draw	8–1–3	Tommy Ryan	PTS	6	Apr 29, 1893	Coney Island A.C., Brooklyn, New York City, New York, U.S.	
11	Win	8–1–2	Tom Williams	KO	2 (?)	Apr 17, 1893	Coney Island A.C., Brooklyn, New York City, New York, U.S.	Retained world welterweight title claim
10	Win	7–1–2	Danny Needham	KO	14 (?)	Dec 14, 1892	Wigwam Theatre, San Francisco, California, U.S.	Claimed world welterweight title
9	Win	6–1–2	Billy (Shadow) Maber	KO	26 (?)	Sep 20, 1892	Pastime A.C., Portland, Oregon, U.S.	
8	Win	5–1–2	Charles Gleason	TKO	4 (20)	Jun 29, 1892	Pastime A.C., Portland, Oregon, U.S.	
7	Draw	4–1–2	Tommy West	PTS	10	Apr 28, 1892	Pastime A.C., Portland, Oregon, U.S.	
6	Win	4–1–1	Billy Armstrong	KO	14 (?)	Mar 21, 1892	Occidental A.C., San Francisco, California, U.S.	
5	Win	3–1–1	Frank Kelly	KO	37 (?)	Feb 16, 1892	New Wigwam, San Francisco, California, U.S.	A finish fight
4	Loss	2–1–1	Frank Purcell	PTS	10	Jan 27, 1892	California A.C., San Francisco, California, U.S.	
3	Win	2–0–1	Billy Kelly	PTS	5 (4)	Jan 20, 1892	California A.C., San Francisco, California, U.S.	The fight was even after four scheduled rounds so another was ordered
2	Win	1–0–1	Frank Tebeau	TKO	5 (?)	Feb 2, 1891	Canada	Exact date and location unknown
1	Draw	0–0–1	Ed Harvey	PTS	10	Dec 1, 1890	Saint John, New Brunswick, Canada	Exact date unknown

=== Unofficial record ===
94 fights	37 wins	25 losses
By knockout	24	8
By decision	12	5
By disqualification	1	12
Draws	27	
No contests	5	

Record with the inclusion of newspaper decisions in the win/loss/draw column.

No.	Result	Record	Opponent	Type	Round	Date	Location	Notes
94	Loss	37–25–27 (5)	Jack Root	TKO	6 (6)	Dec 29, 1915	Rose City A.C., Portland, Oregon, U.S.	
93	Loss	37–24–27 (5)	Jim Cameron	DQ	3 (4)	Jul 21, 1911	Dreamland Rink, San Francisco, California, U.S.	Smith was disqualified for wrestling and holding
92	Win	37–23–27 (5)	Al Neill	PTS	10	Jun 10, 1910	Exposition Rink, Saint Johns, Oregon, U.S.	
91	Loss	36–23–27 (5)	Barbados Joe Walcott	TKO	4 (20)	May 28, 1903	Exposition Building, Portland, Oregon, U.S.	
90	Loss	36–22–27 (5)	Tommy Ryan	KO	4 (20)	Mar 14, 1902	Turner Hall, Kansas City, Missouri, U.S.	
89	Loss	36–21–27 (5)	Al Neill	DQ	10 (20)	Jan 23, 1902	Pastime A.C., Portland, Oregon, U.S.	Smith kicked Neill, then bit him on the shoulder
88	Draw	36–20–27 (5)	Al Neill	PTS	20	Nov 29, 1901	Exposition Building, Portland, Oregon, U.S.	
87	Draw	36–20–26 (5)	Tom Tracey	PTS	20	Oct 25, 1901	Exposition Building, Portland, Oregon, U.S.	
86	Draw	36–20–25 (5)	George Byers	PTS	15	Aug 19, 1901	Victoria Rink, Saint John, New Brunswick, Canada	
85	Loss	36–20–24 (5)	Young Peter Jackson	TKO	2 (?)	Jun 14, 1901	Germania Maennerchor Hall, Baltimore, Maryland, U.S.	
84	Draw	36–19–24 (5)	Tim Hurley	PTS	20	Mar 21, 1901	Opera House, New London, Connecticut, U.S.	
83	Draw	36–19–23 (5)	Owen Ziegler	PTS	10 (20)	Feb 12, 1901	Lake City A.C., Erie, Pennsylvania, U.S.	The bout was stopped in 10th by deputy sheriff, and called a draw
82	NC	36–19–22 (5)	Jack Mahoney	NC	11 (?)	Dec 27, 1900	Paterson, New Jersey, U.S.	
81	Draw	36–19–22 (4)	Professor Mike Donovan	PTS	20	Nov 22, 1900	Metropolitan A.C., Wheeling, West Virginia, U.S.	
80	Loss	36–19–21 (4)	Jim Judge	DQ	11 (?)	Nov 14, 1900	Savannah, Georgia, U.S.	
79	Loss	36–18–21 (4)	Barbados Joe Walcott	DQ	10 (20)	Sep 24, 1900	Coliseum, Hartford, Connecticut, U.S.	
78	Win	36–17–21 (4)	Young Peter Jackson	TKO	18 (?)	Sep 11, 1900	Cleveland, Ohio, U.S.	Police intervened to save Jackson from further punishment
77	Loss	35–17–21 (4)	Jimmy Handler	PTS	25	Jun 29, 1900	Broadway A.C., Manhattan, New York City, New York, U.S.	
76	Loss	35–16–21 (4)	Barbados Joe Walcott	PTS	25	May 4, 1900	Broadway A.C., Manhattan, New York City, New York, U.S.	
75	Loss	35–15–21 (4)	Matty Matthews	KO	19 (25)	Apr 17, 1900	Broadway A.C., Manhattan, New York City, New York, U.S.	Lost world welterweight title
74	Draw	35–14–21 (4)	Jack Mahoney	PTS	25	Mar 12, 1900	Hercules A.C., Brooklyn, New York City, New York, U.S.	Retained world welterweight title
73	Win	35–14–20 (4)	Frank McConnell	DQ	21 (25)	Jan 26, 1900	Broadway A.C., Manhattan, New York City, New York, U.S.	Retained world welterweight title
72	Loss	34–14–20 (4)	Rube Ferns	DQ	21 (25)	Jan 15, 1900	Hawthorne A.C., Buffalo, New York, U.S.	World welterweight title; Smith knocked Ferns down 15 times before fouling him Both men claimed the championship afterwards
71	Win	34–13–20 (4)	Charlie McKeever	PTS	20	Nov 8, 1899	Broadway A.C., Brooklyn, New York City, New York, U.S.	Retained world welterweight title
70	Loss	33–13–20 (4)	Charlie McKeever	NWS	6	Oct 20, 1899	Industrial Hall, Philadelphia, Pennsylvania, U.S.	
69	Draw	33–12–20 (4)	Billy Stift	PTS	6	Sep 29, 1899	Star Theatre, Chicago, Illinois, U.S.	
68	Win	33–12–19 (4)	Bob Douglass	KO	4 (20)	Sep 25, 1899	Olympic A.C., Denver, Colorado, U.S.	
67	Draw	32–12–19 (4)	Andy Walsh	PTS	25	Aug 4, 1899	Broadway A.C., Brooklyn, New York City, New York, U.S.	
66	Win	32–12–18 (4)	Young Bailey	NWS	4 (?)	Jul 31, 1899	Broadway A.C., Philadelphia, Pennsylvania, U.S.	
65	Draw	31–12–18 (4)	Jack Mahoney	NWS	6	Jul 28, 1899	Industrial Hall, Philadelphia, Pennsylvania, U.S.	
64	Draw	31–12–17 (4)	Charlie McKeever	PTS	20	Jun 30, 1899	Broadway A.C., Manhattan, New York City, New York, U.S.	
63	Win	31–12–16 (4)	George Lavigne	KO	14 (20)	Mar 10, 1899	Woodward's Pavilion, San Francisco, California, U.S.	Retained world welterweight title; Won vacant American welterweight title
62	Win	30–12–16 (4)	Australian Billy Edwards	KO	14 (20)	Jan 24, 1899	Lenox A.C., Manhattan, New York City, New York, U.S.	
61	Win	29–12–16 (4)	Barbados Joe Walcott	PTS	20	Dec 6, 1898	Lenox A.C., Manhattan, New York City, New York, U.S.	Retained world welterweight title
60	Draw	28–12–16 (4)	Tommy West	PTS	20	Nov 14, 1898	Horizon A.C., Bridgeport, Connecticut, U.S.	
59	Win	28–12–15 (4)	Charlie McKeever	PTS	25	Oct 7, 1898	Lenox A.C., Manhattan, New York City, New York, U.S.	Retained world welterweight title
58	Win	27–12–15 (4)	Jim Judge	KO	20 (20)	Oct 3, 1898	American S.C., Scranton, Pennsylvania, U.S.	
57	Draw	26–12–15 (4)	Andy Walsh	PTS	25	Sep 5, 1898	Greater New York A.C., Coney Island, New York, U.S.	
56	Win	26–12–14 (4)	Matty Matthews	PTS	25	Aug 25, 1898	Lenox A.C., Manhattan, New York City, New York, U.S.	Won vacant world welterweight title
55	Win	25–12–14 (4)	George "Young Corbett" Green	PTS	25	Jul 29, 1898	Lenox A.C., Manhattan, New York City, New York, U.S.	
54	Draw	24–12–14 (4)	Andy Walsh	PTS	15	Jun 25, 1898	Greater New York A.C., Brooklyn, New York City, New York, U.S.	
53	Loss	24–12–13 (4)	Billy Stift	DQ	5 (6)	Jun 3, 1898	Tattersall's, Chicago, Illinois, U.S.	
52	Draw	24–11–13 (4)	Charley Johnson	PTS	15	May 23, 1898	Olympic A.C., Athens, Pennsylvania, U.S.	
51	Loss	24–11–12 (4)	Tim Callahan	NWS	6	Apr 22, 1898	Arena A.C., Philadelphia, Pennsylvania, U.S.	
50	Draw	24–10–12 (4)	Barbados Joe Walcott	PTS	25	Apr 14, 1898	Park City Theater, Bridgeport, Connecticut, U.S.	
49	Draw	24–10–11 (4)	Abe Ullman	PTS	8	Feb 18, 1898	Germania Maennerchor Hall, Baltimore, Maryland, U.S.	
48	Loss	24–10–10 (4)	Charley Johnson	DQ	1 (?)	Jan 28, 1898	Arena A.C., Philadelphia, Pennsylvania, U.S.	
47	Win	24–9–10 (4)	Johnny Gorman	DQ	5 (?)	Dec 13, 1897	Park City Theater, Bridgeport, Connecticut, U.S.	Gorman was disqualified for wrestling
46	Win	23–9–10 (4)	Billy Mulligan	TKO	2 (?)	Dec 6, 1897	Yonkers, New York, U.S.	
45	Loss	22–9–10 (4)	Jack Bonner	NWS	6	Oct 11, 1897	Quaker City A.C., Philadelphia, Pennsylvania, U.S.	
44	Win	22–8–10 (4)	Jack Howard	TKO	9 (?)	Sep 17, 1897	Clarendon A.C., Manhattan, New York City, New York, U.S.	
43	Win	21–8–10 (4)	Mike Dempsey	TKO	2 (10)	Sep 6, 1897	Greenpoint S.C., Brooklyn, New York City, New York, U.S.	
42	Draw	20–8–10 (4)	Jack Powers	PTS	8	Aug 23, 1897	Saint John, New Brunswick, Canada	
41	Loss	20–8–9 (4)	Jack Bonner	KO	5 (6)	Jun 8, 1897	Olympic A.C., Athens, Pennsylvania, U.S.	
40	Win	20–7–9 (4)	Abe Ullman	PTS	20	May 29, 1897	Polo A.C., Manhattan, New York City, New York, U.S.	
39	Loss	19–7–9 (4)	George "Young Corbett" Green	TKO	12 (?)	Mar 17, 1897	The Race Track Arena, Carson City, Nevada, U.S.	For vacant world welterweight title claim
38	Draw	19–6–9 (4)	Con Doyle	PTS	12	Jan 9, 1897	Polo A.C., Manhattan, New York City, New York, U.S.	
37	Loss	19–6–8 (4)	Tommy Ryan	DQ	9 (20)	Nov 25, 1896	Empire A.C., Maspeth, Queens, New York City, New York, U.S.	
36	Loss	19–5–8 (4)	Australian Jim Ryan	DQ	7 (10)	Sep 4, 1896	Astoria, Oregon, U.S.	Ryan lost his footing and went down and Smith landed a blow while he was down
35	NC	19–4–8 (4)	Billy Gallagher	NC	1 (10)	Jul 2, 1896	Occidental A.C., San Francisco, California, U.S.	Police stopped the fight when it got too wild
34	Loss	19–4–8 (3)	Charles Kid McCoy	DQ	6 (15)	May 18, 1896	Newton Street Armory, Boston, Massachusetts, U.S.	For world middleweight title
33	Win	19–3–8 (3)	Bill Husbands	TKO	8 (8)	Mar 30, 1896	National Sporting Club, Covent Garden, London, England, U.K.	
32	Win	18–3–8 (3)	Trooper Ham	KO	1 (3)	Mar 5, 1896	Store Street Hall, Tottenham Court Road, Westminster, London, England, U.K.	
31	Win	17–3–8 (3)	Jack Bryan	KO	1 (3)	Mar 5, 1896	Store Street Hall, Tottenham Court Road, Westminster, London, England, U.K.	
30	Win	16–3–8 (3)	Arthur Morris	DQ	1 (?)	Mar 5, 1896	Store Street Hall, Tottenham Court Road, Westminster, London, England, U.K.	
29	Win	15–3–8 (3)	Pat Kehoe	TKO	1 (?)	Jan 15, 1896	Auditorium, Hartford, Connecticut, U.S.	
28	ND	14–3–8 (3)	Tom Cawley	ND	6	Dec 27, 1895	Alhambra, Syracuse, New York, U.S.	
27	Draw	14–3–8 (2)	Tommy Ryan	PTS	18 (25)	May 27, 1895	Sea Side A.C., Coney Island, New York, U.S.	For world welterweight title; Stopped when the police intervened, with Smith hanging helpless on the ropes
26	ND	14–3–7 (2)	Jimmy Mann	ND	4	Apr 1, 1895	Atlantic City, New Jersey, U.S.	
25	Win	14–3–7 (1)	Ed Vaughn	TKO	4 (4)	Mar 14, 1895	Front Street Theater, Baltimore, Maryland, U.S.	
24	Win	13–3–7 (1)	Young Hagen	TKO	4 (?)	Mar 5, 1895	Philadelphia, Pennsylvania, U.S.	
23	Draw	12–3–7 (1)	Barbados Joe Walcott	PTS	15	Mar 1, 1895	Music Hall, Boston, Massachusetts, U.S.	Reported for the 140lbs Championship of America
22	ND	12–3–6 (1)	Peter Maher	ND	3	Feb 13, 1895	Lynn, Massachusetts, U.S.	
21	Win	12–3–6	Harry Gallagher	NWS	4	Feb 1, 1895	Caledonian A.C., Philadelphia, Pennsylvania, U.S.	
20	Draw	11–3–6	Jack Powers	PTS	6	Nov 19, 1894	Saint John, New Brunswick, Canada	
19	Draw	11–3–5	Dick O'Brien	PTS	10	Oct 29, 1894	Lafayette A.C., Boston, Massachusetts, U.S.	
18	Loss	11–3–4	Mayo	KO	? (?)	Aug 17, 1894	Pentwater, Michigan, U.S.	
17	Loss	11–2–4	Tommy Ryan	PTS	20	Jul 26, 1894	Twin City A.C., Minneapolis, Minnesota, U.S.	Lost world welterweight title claim; For world welterweight title
16	Win	11–1–4	Eddie Butler	TKO	2 (?)	May 15, 1894	Spring Valley, Illinois, U.S.	
15	Win	10–1–4	Fletcher Robbins	TKO	4 (?)	Feb 19, 1894	Streator, California, U.S.	The police stopped the fight
14	Draw	9–1–4	Tommy Ryan	PTS	6	Jan 9, 1894	Casino, Boston, Massachusetts, U.S.	
13	Win	9–1–3	Billy McCarthy	PTS	6	Sep 20, 1893	2nd Regiment Armory, Chicago, Illinois, U.S.	
12	Draw	8–1–3	Tommy Ryan	PTS	6	Apr 29, 1893	Coney Island A.C., Brooklyn, New York City, New York, U.S.	
11	Win	8–1–2	Tom Williams	KO	2 (?)	Apr 17, 1893	Coney Island A.C., Brooklyn, New York City, New York, U.S.	Retained world welterweight title claim
10	Win	7–1–2	Danny Needham	KO	14 (?)	Dec 14, 1892	Wigwam Theatre, San Francisco, California, U.S.	Claimed world welterweight title
9	Win	6–1–2	Billy (Shadow) Maber	KO	26 (?)	Sep 20, 1892	Pastime A.C., Portland, Oregon, U.S.	
8	Win	5–1–2	Charles Gleason	TKO	4 (20)	Jun 29, 1892	Pastime A.C., Portland, Oregon, U.S.	
7	Draw	4–1–2	Tommy West	PTS	10	Apr 28, 1892	Pastime A.C., Portland, Oregon, U.S.	
6	Win	4–1–1	Billy Armstrong	KO	14 (?)	Mar 21, 1892	Occidental A.C., San Francisco, California, U.S.	
5	Win	3–1–1	Frank Kelly	KO	37 (?)	Feb 16, 1892	New Wigwam, San Francisco, California, U.S.	A finish fight
4	Loss	2–1–1	Frank Purcell	PTS	10	Jan 27, 1892	California A.C., San Francisco, California, U.S.	
3	Win	2–0–1	Billy Kelly	PTS	5 (4)	Jan 20, 1892	California A.C., San Francisco, California, U.S.	The fight was even after four scheduled rounds so another was ordered
2	Win	1–0–1	Frank Tebeau	TKO	5 (?)	Feb 2, 1891	Canada	Exact date and location unknown
1	Draw	0–0–1	Ed Harvey	PTS	10	Dec 1, 1890	Saint John, New Brunswick, Canada	Exact date unknown

== See also ==
- Lineal championship
- List of welterweight boxing champions

Achievements
Vacant Title last held by Paddy Duffy	World Welterweight Champion; December 14, 1892 – July 26, 1894	Succeeded by Tommy Ryan
Vacant Title last held by Tommy Ryan	World Welterweight Champion; August 25, 1898 – April 17, 1900	Succeeded by Matty Matthews
