= Kid Lavigne =

American boxer

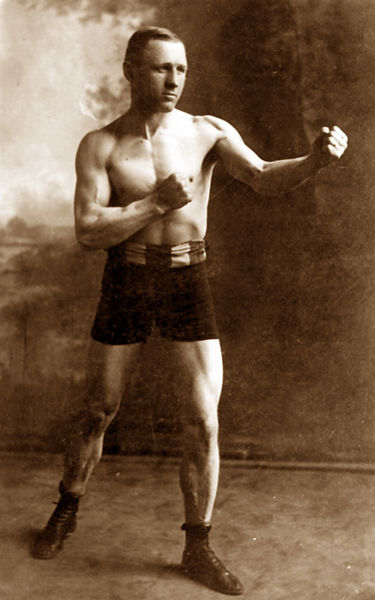

Personal information
- Nickname: The Saginaw Kid
- Nationality: American
- Born: George Henry Lavigne; December 6, 1869 Bay City, Michigan, U.S.
- Died: March 9, 1928 (aged 58) Detroit, Michigan, U.S.
- Height: 5 ft 3 1/2 in (161 cm)
- Weight: Lightweight

Boxing career
- Stance: Orthodox stance

Boxing record
- Total fights: 58
- Wins: 37
- Win by KO: 21
- Losses: 9
- Draws: 11
- No contests: 1

George Henry "Kid" Lavigne (December 6, 1869 – March 9, 1928) was boxing's first widely recognized World Lightweight champion, winning the vacant title on June 1, 1896.

== Early life ==
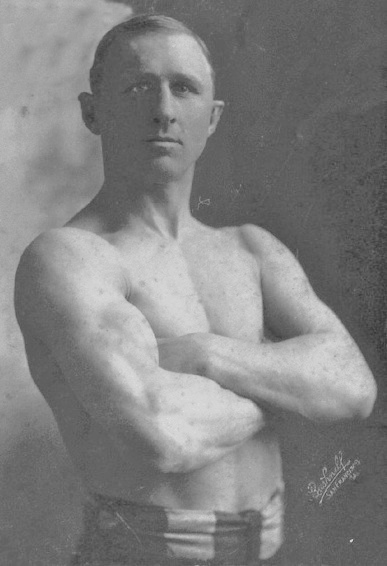
George "Kid" Lavigne 1899

He was born in Bay City, Michigan to French-Canadian parents, Jean Baptiste Lavigne and Marie Agnes Dufort, who immigrated to the area from St. Polycarpe, Quebec in 1868. As a youth he worked in his mother's boarding house and later trained as a "cooper" in a sawmill, building barrels to ship salt, a byproduct of many of the mills in the area that sat upon large salt deposits. The "Kid" got the boxing bug from his brother Billy Lavigne who was tutored in the fistic arts by black heavyweight and local barber, C. A. C. Smith. Billy would later become the Kid's manager through various parts of his professional career. Lavigne began his amateur boxing career by taking on the best bare-knuckle fighters of the logging camps. He had his professional debut as a 16-year-old, fighting under the Marquess of Queensberry rules with gloved fists and timed rounds against Morris McNally. It was a first-round knockout.

== Pro career ==
Kid Lavigne became a professional boxer in 1886 and was undefeated with 32 wins, 11 draws, 10 no decisions and 1 no contest in his first 54 fights over a span of 12 and 1/2 years. After defeating the local talent of the area in his first 12 fights he fought journeyman George Siddons in two battles of 77 and 55 rounds in a span of two months. The first bout went five hours and nine minutes...the longest fight to date under Queensberry rules. While both were ruled draws Siddons conceded defeat in the second bout and with it Kid Lavigne became lightweight champion of the Northwest.

After fighting several bouts on the West Coast in the early 1890s he landed a bout in 1894 with the lightweight champion of Australia, Albert Griffiths, aka Young Griffo. Griffo was considered by all to be the most gifted boxer of the era whose ability to avoid getting hit was legendary. The Kid managed to get a draw in this eight-round contest and a year later another draw over 20 rounds. In December 1894 he fought the lightweight champion of the south, Andy Bowen, a veteran of the longest fight in the history of modern boxing, a 110-round, 7 hour and 19 minute marathon. It was in the 18th round that Bowen, being beaten badly by Lavigne, was knocked down hitting his head sharply on the unpadded ring surface. He never regained consciousness and died the next morning at 7:00 am. At first Lavigne was arrested for the death of Bowen but was later found to be innocent of any wrongdoing as a coroner's inquest ruled that Bowen's death was the result of hitting his head on the floor of the ring.

After Lavigne's disastrous defeat of Bowen he was universally recognized as the American lightweight champion. He found it more difficult to get matches in his own weight class and was finally matched with Barbados Joe Walcott, the "Barbados Demon". Boxers in both middle and heavy weight classes respected and were wary of the skills of Walcott, though he fought ten to twenty pounds lighter. In what has become known as possibly the greatest fight of the early Queensberry era, Lavigne, battered and bloodied with John L. Sullivan at ringside pleading with the referee to halt the carnage, rallied for the win by pummeling Walcott in the latter part of the 15-round bout.

With few left stateside to challenge the indefatigable Lavigne, he sailed for London to fight "Iron Man" Dick Burge, the English champion in June 1896. He stunned Burge with his relentless pressure and hard hitting, knocking him down repeatedly in the 16th and 17th rounds before the referee called a halt and awarded the fight to Lavigne by technical knockout. He was now the first undisputed lightweight champion of the world under Marquess of Queensberry rules. He successfully defended his title six times, including a rematch with Joe Walcott where he punished Walcott through 12 rounds. Just prior to the beginning of the 13th a sponge sailed into the ring from Walcott's corner signaling the end. Feeling somewhat invincible the Kid decided to try his skills in a heavier weight class when he challenged his good friend and current welterweight champion, "Mysterious" Billy Smith. In March 1899 Lavigne fought briskly for 10 rounds getting the best of Smith. The tide turned and Smith had him out on his feet in the 14th and was sizing-up the knockout blow when the Kid's manager and brother, Billy Lavigne, stepped into the ring and stopped the fight. In the first loss of Lavigne's career, Smith won on a technical knockout. Lavigne finally lost the title in a 20-round decision to Frank Erne in July 1899. Lavigne was beaten again that year by a nineteenth-round knockout from George "Elbows" McFadden.

== Retirement ==
He fought on sparingly over the next few years, but his addiction to alcohol and his lack of proper training took its toll. After another knockout at the hands of young Jimmy Britt, Lavigne sailed for France and opened a boxing school in Paris for three years. He returned to the states and opened a saloon in Detroit, "Kid Lavigne's Triangle Cafe". He continued to believe he could make a comeback and fought a few exhibitions. His lost his final match in six rounds against "Fighting" Dick Nelson in 1909. Finally closing his saloon in late 1913, by 1914 he found himself working for the Highland Park Plant of the Ford Motor Company near his home in Detroit. After his first wife Julia Drujon died in 1922, he remarried two years later to Flora M. Davey. He had no children. He worked at Ford until his death of a heart attack at his home at 111 LaBelle Avenue on March 9, 1928, and is buried at Forest Lawn Cemetery in Saginaw. He was 58 years of age, and like many boxers of his era, had a life somewhat shorter than average.

== Honors ==
Lavigne was inducted into the Ring Hall of Fame in 1959, the Michigan Boxing Hall of Fame in 1965, the International Boxing Hall of Fame in 1998, the Bay County Sports Hall of Fame in 1998, and the Saginaw County Sports Hall of Fame in 2002.

== In other media ==
Front cover of Muscle and Mayhem: The Saginaw Kid and the Fistic World of the 1890s, by Lauren D. Chouinard.

Writer Lauren D. Chouinard, a cousin of Kid Lavigne's, wrote a biography of the Kid titled Muscle and Mayhem: The Saginaw Kid and the Fistic World of the 1890s (2013).

Writer Robert E. Howard wrote a poem eulogizing Kid Lavigne called "Kid Lavigne is Dead".

== Professional boxing record ==
All information in this section is derived from BoxRec, unless otherwise stated.

=== Official record ===
58 fights	35 wins	6 losses
By knockout	21	4
By decision	14	2
Draws	11	
No contests	1	
Newspaper decisions/draws	5	

All newspaper decisions are officially regarded as “no decision” bouts and are not counted in the win/loss/draw column.

No.	Result	Record	Opponent	Type	Round	Date	Location	Notes
58	Loss	35–6–11 (6)	Dick Nelson	PTS	6	Dec 25, 1909	Detroit, Michigan, U.S.	
57	Loss	35–5–11 (6)	Young Erne	TKO	6 (6)	Jan 19, 1907	National A.C., Philadelphia, Pennsylvania, U.S.	
56	Win	35–4–11 (6)	Jack Roberts	RTD	5 (6)	Jul 2, 1905	Nouveau Cirque, Paris, Paris, France	
55	Loss	34–4–11 (6)	Jimmy Britt	TKO	8 (20)	May 29, 1902	Woodward's Pavilion, San Francisco, California, U.S.	
54	Win	34–3–11 (6)	Tim Hegarty	KO	4 (20)	Dec 12, 1901	Acme A.C., Oakland, California, U.S.	
53	Loss	33–3–11 (6)	George "Elbows" McFadden	KO	19 (25)	Oct 6, 1899	Broadway A.C., Brooklyn, New York City, New York, U.S.	
52	Loss	33–2–11 (6)	Frank Erne	PTS	20	Jul 3, 1899	Hawthorne A.C., Buffalo, New York, U.S.	Lost world lightweight title
51	Loss	33–1–11 (6)	Mysterious Billy Smith	TKO	14 (20)	Mar 10, 1899	Woodward's Pavilion, San Francisco, California, U.S.	For American and world welterweight titles
50	Win	33–0–11 (6)	Tom Tracey	PTS	20	Nov 25, 1898	Woodward's Pavilion, San Francisco, California, U.S.	
49	Draw	32–0–11 (6)	Frank Erne	PTS	20	Sep 28, 1898	Greater New York A.C., Brooklyn, New York City, New York, U.S.	Retained world lightweight title
48	Loss	32–0–10 (6)	Wilmington Jack Daly	NWS	6	Apr 11, 1898	Arena A.C., Philadelphia, Pennsylvania, U.S.	
47	Draw	32–0–10 (5)	Wilmington Jack Daly	PTS	20	Feb 17, 1898	Central Armory, Cleveland, Ohio, U.S.	Retained world lightweight title
46	Win	32–0–9 (5)	Barbados Joe Walcott	TKO	12 (20)	Oct 29, 1897	Mechanic's Pavilion, San Francisco, California, U.S.	Retained world lightweight title
45	Loss	31–0–9 (5)	Owen Ziegler	NWS	6	May 17, 1897	Winter Circus, Philadelphia, Pennsylvania, U.S.	
44	Win	31–0–9 (4)	Eddie Connolly	TKO	11 (25)	Apr 30, 1897	Broadway A.C., New York City, New York, U.S.	Retained world lightweight title
43	Loss	30–0–9 (4)	Charlie McKeever	NWS	6	Mar 8, 1897	Quaker City A.C., Philadelphia, Pennsylvania, U.S.	
42	Win	30–0–9 (3)	Kid McPartland	PTS	25	Feb 8, 1897	Broadway A.C., New York City, New York, U.S.	Retained world lightweight title
41	Win	29–0–9 (3)	Owen Ziegler	PTS	6	Jan 11, 1897	Winter Circus, Philadelphia, Pennsylvania, U.S.	
40	Win	28–0–9 (3)	Jack Everhardt	TKO	24 (25)	Oct 27, 1896	Bohemian Sporting Club, New York City, New York, U.S.	Retained world lightweight title
39	Draw	27–0–9 (3)	Charlie McKeever	NWS	6	Jul 20, 1896	Madison Square Garden, New York City, New York, U.S.	
38	Win	27–0–9 (2)	Dick Burge	TKO	17 (20)	Jun 1, 1896	National Sporting Club, Covent Garden, London, England	Won vacant world lightweight title
37	Win	26–0–9 (2)	Barbados Joe Walcott	PTS	15	Dec 12, 1895	Empire A.C., Maspeth, Queens, New York City, New York, U.S.	Retained American lightweight title; Agreement called for Lavigne to be the; winner if he was not knocked out
36	Draw	25–0–9 (2)	Young Griffo	PTS	20	Oct 12, 1895	Empire A.C., Maspeth, Queens, New York City, New York, U.S.	Retained American lightweight title
35	Win	25–0–8 (2)	Jack Everhardt	KO	5 (20)	Aug 26, 1895	Maspeth Empire AC, Maspeth, Queens, New York City, New York, U.S.	Retained American lightweight title
34	Win	24–0–8 (2)	Jack Everhardt	PTS	20	May 30, 1895	Seaside A.C., Brooklyn, New York City, New York, U.S.	Won vacant American 138lbs title
33	Draw	23–0–8 (2)	Jerry Marshall	PTS	8	Apr 11, 1895	Triangle Club, Chicago, Illinois, U.S.	Pre-arranged draw if lasting the distance
32	Win	23–0–7 (2)	Andy Bowen	KO	18 (25)	Dec 14, 1894	Auditorium Club, New Orleans, Louisiana, U.S.	Won vacant American lightweight title; Bowen died of injuries sustained from the fight.
31	Win	22–0–7 (2)	Johnny Griffin	TKO	15 (15)	Oct 29, 1894	Coney Island Casino, Brooklyn, New York City, New York, U.S.	
30	Win	21–0–7 (2)	Jerry Marshall	PTS	10	Sep 17, 1894	Seaside A.C., Brooklyn, New York City, New York, U.S.	
29	Draw	20–0–7 (2)	Solly Smith	PTS	8	Mar 7, 1894	Arbeiter Hall, Saginaw, Michigan, U.S.	Pre-arranged draw if lasting the distance
28	Draw	20–0–6 (2)	Young Griffo	PTS	8	Feb 10, 1894	2nd Regiment Armory, Chicago, Illinois, U.S.	
27	Win	20–0–5 (2)	Billy Gaffney	NWS	10	Mar 29, 1893	Auditorium, Detroit, Michigan, U.S.	
26	Win	20–0–5 (1)	Eddie Myer	KO	22 (?)	Feb 12, 1893	Abandoned Skating Rink, Dana, Illinois, U.S.	
25	Win	19–0–5 (1)	Martin Shaughnessy	KO	9 (10)	Nov 21, 1892	Washington avenue rink, Bay City, Michigan, U.S.	
24	Draw	18–0–5 (1)	Jim Burge	PTS	50 (?)	Aug 10, 1892	Pacific A.C., San Francisco, California, U.S.	
23	Win	18–0–4 (1)	Harry Jones	KO	8 (20)	May 25, 1892	Pastime A.C., Portland, Oregon, U.S.	
22	Win	17–0–4 (1)	Charles Rochette	PTS	10	Mar 17, 1892	Wigwam Theatre, San Francisco, California, U.S.	
21	Win	16–0–4 (1)	Joe Soto	KO	30 (?)	Nov 20, 1891	Wigwam Theatre, San Francisco, California, U.S.	
20	Win	15–0–4 (1)	Jimmie Lucie	PTS	4	Oct 15, 1891	San Francisco, California, U.S.	
19	Win	14–0–4 (1)	Sam Eaton	RTD	5 (15)	Nov 3, 1890	La France hall, Bay City, Michigan, U.S.	
18	Draw	13–0–4 (1)	Billy Bouchey	PTS	3	Apr 14, 1890	Saginaw, Michigan, U.S.	
17	Win	13–0–3 (1)	Morris McNally	PTS	3	Mar 13, 1890	Saginaw, Michigan, U.S.	
16	Win	12–0–3 (1)	Billy O'Brien	PTS	4	May 12, 1889	Detroit, Michigan, U.S.	
15	Draw	11–0–3 (1)	George Siddons	PTS	55 (?)	Apr 25, 1889	Al Carroll's Roadhouse at Reed's Lake, Grand Rapids, Michigan, U.S.	
14	Win	11–0–2 (1)	Butch Kenney	PTS	4	Mar 10, 1889	Palace Theatre, Manistee, Michigan, U.S.	
13	Draw	10–0–2 (1)	George Siddons	PTS	77 (?)	Feb 28, 1889	Barn behind Old Man Putnam's Roadhouse, Saginaw, Michigan, U.S.	
12	Win	10–0–1 (1)	Jack Menton	PTS	12	Sep 21, 1888	Manistee, Michigan, U.S.	
11	Win	9–0–1 (1)	Chub Whitney	KO	3 (?)	Jun 10, 1888	Manistee, Michigan, U.S.	
10	Draw	8–0–1 (1)	Pike Johnson	PTS	8	Mar 2, 1888	Bordwell's Opera House, Saginaw, Michigan, U.S.	
9	Win	8–0 (1)	Dan Connors	KO	5 (?)	Feb 10, 1888	Saginaw, Michigan, U.S.	
8	ND	7–0 (1)	Red Elliott	ND	3	Feb 28, 1887	Saginaw, Michigan, U.S.	
7	Win	7–0	Jack Cherry	PTS	8	Dec 28, 1886	Saginaw, Michigan, U.S.	
6	Win	6–0	Red Elliott	PTS	4	Nov 18, 1886	Saginaw, Michigan, U.S.	
5	Win	5–0	Jimmy Priest	KO	3 (?)	Oct 28, 1886	Saginaw, Michigan, U.S.	
4	Win	4–0	Bob Ralph	KO	3 (?)	Oct 19, 1886	Saginaw, Michigan, U.S.	
3	Win	3–0	Billy Roberts	KO	3 (?)	Sep 21, 1886	Saginaw, Michigan, U.S.	
2	Win	2–0	Billy White	KO	1 (?)	Sep 11, 1886	Saginaw, Michigan, U.S.	
1	Win	1–0	Morris McNally	KO	1 (6)	Sep 7, 1886	Auditorium, Saginaw, Michigan, U.S.	

=== Unofficial record ===
58 fights	36 wins	9 losses
By knockout	21	4
By decision	15	5
Draws	12	
No contests	1	

Record with the inclusion of newspaper decisions in the win/loss/draw column.

No.	Result	Record	Opponent	Type	Round	Date	Location	Notes
58	Loss	36–9–12 (1)	Dick Nelson	PTS	6	Dec 25, 1909	Detroit, Michigan, U.S.	
57	Loss	36–8–12 (1)	Young Erne	TKO	6 (6)	Jan 19, 1907	National A.C., Philadelphia, Pennsylvania, U.S.	
56	Win	36–7–12 (1)	Jack Roberts	RTD	5 (6)	Jul 2, 1905	Nouveau Cirque, Paris, Paris, France	
55	Loss	35–7–12 (1)	Jimmy Britt	TKO	8 (20)	May 29, 1902	Woodward's Pavilion, San Francisco, California, U.S.	
54	Win	35–6–12 (1)	Tim Hegarty	KO	4 (20)	Dec 12, 1901	Acme A.C., Oakland, California, U.S.	
53	Loss	34–6–12 (1)	George "Elbows" McFadden	KO	19 (25)	Oct 6, 1899	Broadway A.C., Brooklyn, New York City, New York, U.S.	
52	Loss	34–5–12 (1)	Frank Erne	PTS	20	Jul 3, 1899	Hawthorne A.C., Buffalo, New York, U.S.	Lost world lightweight title
51	Loss	34–4–12 (1)	Mysterious Billy Smith	TKO	14 (20)	Mar 10, 1899	Woodward's Pavilion, San Francisco, California, U.S.	For American and world welterweight titles
50	Win	34–3–12 (1)	Tom Tracey	PTS	20	Nov 25, 1898	Woodward's Pavilion, San Francisco, California, U.S.	
49	Draw	33–3–12 (1)	Frank Erne	PTS	20	Sep 28, 1898	Greater New York A.C., Brooklyn, New York City, New York, U.S.	Retained world lightweight title
48	Loss	33–3–11 (1)	Wilmington Jack Daly	NWS	6	Apr 11, 1898	Arena A.C., Philadelphia, Pennsylvania, U.S.	
47	Draw	33–2–11 (1)	Wilmington Jack Daly	PTS	20	Feb 17, 1898	Central Armory, Cleveland, Ohio, U.S.	Retained world lightweight title
46	Win	33–2–10 (1)	Barbados Joe Walcott	TKO	12 (20)	Oct 29, 1897	Mechanic's Pavilion, San Francisco, California, U.S.	Retained world lightweight title
45	Loss	32–2–10 (1)	Owen Ziegler	NWS	6	May 17, 1897	Winter Circus, Philadelphia, Pennsylvania, U.S.	
44	Win	32–1–10 (1)	Eddie Connolly	TKO	11 (25)	Apr 30, 1897	Broadway A.C., New York City, New York, U.S.	Retained world lightweight title
43	Loss	31–1–10 (1)	Charlie McKeever	NWS	6	Mar 8, 1897	Quaker City A.C., Philadelphia, Pennsylvania, U.S.	
42	Win	31–0–10 (1)	Kid McPartland	PTS	25	Feb 8, 1897	Broadway A.C., New York City, New York, U.S.	Retained world lightweight title
41	Win	30–0–10 (1)	Owen Ziegler	PTS	6	Jan 11, 1897	Winter Circus, Philadelphia, Pennsylvania, U.S.	
40	Win	29–0–10 (1)	Jack Everhardt	TKO	24 (25)	Oct 27, 1896	Bohemian Sporting Club, New York City, New York, U.S.	Retained world lightweight title
39	Draw	28–0–10 (1)	Charlie McKeever	NWS	6	Jul 20, 1896	Madison Square Garden, New York City, New York, U.S.	
38	Win	28–0–9 (1)	Dick Burge	TKO	17 (20)	Jun 1, 1896	National Sporting Club, Covent Garden, London, England	Won vacant world lightweight title
37	Win	27–0–9 (1)	Barbados Joe Walcott	PTS	15	Dec 12, 1895	Empire A.C., Maspeth, Queens, New York City, New York, U.S.	Retained American lightweight title; Agreement called for Lavigne to be the; winner if he was not knocked out
36	Draw	26–0–9 (1)	Young Griffo	PTS	20	Oct 12, 1895	Empire A.C., Maspeth, Queens, New York City, New York, U.S.	Retained American lightweight title
35	Win	26–0–8 (1)	Jack Everhardt	KO	5 (20)	Aug 26, 1895	Maspeth Empire AC, Maspeth, Queens, New York City, New York, U.S.	Retained American lightweight title
34	Win	25–0–8 (1)	Jack Everhardt	PTS	20	May 30, 1895	Seaside A.C., Brooklyn, New York City, New York, U.S.	Won vacant American 138lbs title
33	Draw	24–0–8 (1)	Jerry Marshall	PTS	8	Apr 11, 1895	Triangle Club, Chicago, Illinois, U.S.	Pre-arranged draw if lasting the distance
32	Win	24–0–7 (1)	Andy Bowen	KO	18 (25)	Dec 14, 1894	Auditorium Club, New Orleans, Louisiana, U.S.	Won vacant American lightweight title; Bowen died of injuries sustained from the fight.
31	Win	23–0–7 (1)	Johnny Griffin	TKO	15 (15)	Oct 29, 1894	Coney Island Casino, Brooklyn, New York City, New York, U.S.	
30	Win	22–0–7 (1)	Jerry Marshall	PTS	10	Sep 17, 1894	Seaside A.C., Brooklyn, New York City, New York, U.S.	
29	Draw	21–0–7 (1)	Solly Smith	PTS	8	Mar 7, 1894	Arbeiter Hall, Saginaw, Michigan, U.S.	Pre-arranged draw if lasting the distance
28	Draw	21–0–6 (1)	Young Griffo	PTS	8	Feb 10, 1894	2nd Regiment Armory, Chicago, Illinois, U.S.	
27	Win	21–0–5 (1)	Billy Gaffney	NWS	10	Mar 29, 1893	Auditorium, Detroit, Michigan, U.S.	
26	Win	20–0–5 (1)	Eddie Myer	KO	22 (?)	Feb 12, 1893	Abandoned Skating Rink, Dana, Illinois, U.S.	
25	Win	19–0–5 (1)	Martin Shaughnessy	KO	9 (10)	Nov 21, 1892	Washington avenue rink, Bay City, Michigan, U.S.	
24	Draw	18–0–5 (1)	Jim Burge	PTS	50 (?)	Aug 10, 1892	Pacific A.C., San Francisco, California, U.S.	
23	Win	18–0–4 (1)	Harry Jones	KO	8 (20)	May 25, 1892	Pastime A.C., Portland, Oregon, U.S.	
22	Win	17–0–4 (1)	Charles Rochette	PTS	10	Mar 17, 1892	Wigwam Theatre, San Francisco, California, U.S.	
21	Win	16–0–4 (1)	Joe Soto	KO	30 (?)	Nov 20, 1891	Wigwam Theatre, San Francisco, California, U.S.	
20	Win	15–0–4 (1)	Jimmie Lucie	PTS	4	Oct 15, 1891	San Francisco, California, U.S.	
19	Win	14–0–4 (1)	Sam Eaton	RTD	5 (15)	Nov 3, 1890	La France hall, Bay City, Michigan, U.S.	
18	Draw	13–0–4 (1)	Billy Bouchey	PTS	3	Apr 14, 1890	Saginaw, Michigan, U.S.	
17	Win	13–0–3 (1)	Morris McNally	PTS	3	Mar 13, 1890	Saginaw, Michigan, U.S.	
16	Win	12–0–3 (1)	Billy O'Brien	PTS	4	May 12, 1889	Detroit, Michigan, U.S.	
15	Draw	11–0–3 (1)	George Siddons	PTS	55 (?)	Apr 25, 1889	Al Carroll's Roadhouse at Reed's Lake, Grand Rapids, Michigan, U.S.	
14	Win	11–0–2 (1)	Butch Kenney	PTS	4	Mar 10, 1889	Palace Theatre, Manistee, Michigan, U.S.	
13	Draw	10–0–2 (1)	George Siddons	PTS	77 (?)	Feb 28, 1889	Barn behind Old Man Putnam's Roadhouse, Saginaw, Michigan, U.S.	
12	Win	10–0–1 (1)	Jack Menton	PTS	12	Sep 21, 1888	Manistee, Michigan, U.S.	
11	Win	9–0–1 (1)	Chub Whitney	KO	3 (?)	Jun 10, 1888	Manistee, Michigan, U.S.	
10	Draw	8–0–1 (1)	Pike Johnson	PTS	8	Mar 2, 1888	Bordwell's Opera House, Saginaw, Michigan, U.S.	
9	Win	8–0 (1)	Dan Connors	KO	5 (?)	Feb 10, 1888	Saginaw, Michigan, U.S.	
8	ND	7–0 (1)	Red Elliott	ND	3	Feb 28, 1887	Saginaw, Michigan, U.S.	
7	Win	7–0	Jack Cherry	PTS	8	Dec 28, 1886	Saginaw, Michigan, U.S.	
6	Win	6–0	Red Elliott	PTS	4	Nov 18, 1886	Saginaw, Michigan, U.S.	
5	Win	5–0	Jimmy Priest	KO	3 (?)	Oct 28, 1886	Saginaw, Michigan, U.S.	
4	Win	4–0	Bob Ralph	KO	3 (?)	Oct 19, 1886	Saginaw, Michigan, U.S.	
3	Win	3–0	Billy Roberts	KO	3 (?)	Sep 21, 1886	Saginaw, Michigan, U.S.	
2	Win	2–0	Billy White	KO	1 (?)	Sep 11, 1886	Saginaw, Michigan, U.S.	
1	Win	1–0	Morris McNally	KO	1 (6)	Sep 7, 1886	Auditorium, Saginaw, Michigan, U.S.	

== See also ==
- Lineal championship

Achievements
Vacant Title last held by Jack McAuliffe	World Lightweight Champion; June 1, 1896 – July 3, 1899	Succeeded by Frank Erne
