= Eddie Connolly (boxer) =

Canadian boxer (1876–1936)

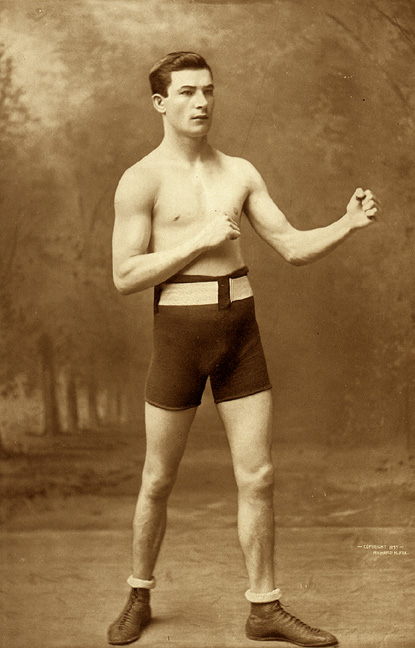

Personal information
- Born: Edward Connolly; November 18, 1876 Saint John, New Brunswick, Canada
- Died: January 1, 1936 (aged 59)
- Height: 5 ft 8.5 in (1.74 m)
- Weight: Welterweight

Boxing career
- Stance: Orthodox

Boxing record
- Total fights: 70
- Wins: 28
- Win by KO: 15
- Losses: 23
- Draws: 19

Eddie Connolly (November 18, 1876 – January 1, 1936) was a Canadian-born boxer who took the World Welterweight Championship in a twenty-five round points decision on June 5, 1900, against reigning champion Matty Matthews at the Seaside Athletic Club in Brooklyn, New York. Earlier in his career, he took both the Canadian Featherweight Title, and the British Empire World Lightweight Title. He was exceptional to have fought for titles in three weight divisions, and to have fought in both lightweight and welterweight divisions for World Championships. His primary and best known manager was Billy Roche, who also managed champion "Mysterious" Billy Smith. He was also managed by Abe Pollack and by Eddie Kelly during his fights in England.

== Early life and career ==
Connolly was born on November 18, 1876, in Saint John, New Brunswick, Canada.

=== Taking the Canadian Featherweight Championship ===
He began boxing professionally around 1894, taking the Canadian Featherweight Title at only eighteen on April 3, 1894, in five rounds in his hometown of Saint John, New Brunswick. He won the bout in a five-round points decision.

Connolly defeated Frank Garrard, a competent featherweight, on October 15, 1895, in a third-round knockout in Cleveland, Ohio. On January 10, 1896, he defeated Jimmy Dime at the Cleveland Athletic Club in Cleveland, Ohio, in a third-round knockout. These victories were instrumental in his quick rise in the boxing world. In January 1893, Dime had won the equivalent of the American Lightweight Championship at 130 pounds in Fonda, New York.

On August 13, 1896, fighting on his home turf of Saint John, New Brunswick, Connolly drew in six rounds with Stanton Abbott at the Mechanics Institute. The fighting was rather subdued and the crowd was small, however, as a New Brunswick magistrate, under pressure to curtail professional boxing, had threatened to arrest not only the principals in the fight but the spectators as well if a bout took place. The police chief and ten constables present at the bout apparently did not prevent the fight from taking place.

=== Taking the World Lightweight Championship of the British Empire ===
On November 24, 1896, Connolly took the British Empire World Lightweight Championship in Birminghamp, U.K. against English champion Tom Causer in a fifth-round knockout. It was an important win, and a widely recognized World Title, though not recognized worldwide, particularly the United States. Causer was a formidable opponent who according to one source, had lost only one bout prior to 1896. He was the favorite in the pre-fight betting at odds of 6 to 4 and a sizable purse of 200 pounds was at stake. The fighting was fierce and often close throughout, with the first full count in the fifth round.

=== Brutal bout with English boxer Dick Burge ===
On January 28, 1897, Connolly fought the great British boxer Dick Burge to a ten-round draw at the Olympic Club in Birmingham, England. Burge was the favorite at 143 pounds, with Connolly five pounds lighter at 138. The bout "caused unusual excitement, crowds flocking to the doors of the clubhouse, and it required extra policemen to preserve order." The sixth and seventh rounds were marked by particularly fierce fighting, with Burge connecting solidly to Connolly's face when he nearly slipped in the sixth, knocking him to the canvas for a count of nine, from which he quickly recovered. At least one source wrote that Burge had the edge in the fight and should have received the decision, despite having over a six-inch disadvantage in reach. The bout was stopped in the tenth round largely as a result of the fierceness of the fighting and the conditions of the competitors. Spectators, the manager of the Olympic Club, and several of the police voiced their desire to stop the fighting. Connolly's head and face were badly battered in the bout. According to Chicago's InterOcean, Burge, angered perhaps by the decision or confused by the fierceness of the contest, began fighting his own cornermen at the conclusion of the fight, and attempted to get at Connolly's trainer.

On March 28, 1897, Connolly met fringe world welterweight contender Paddy Fenton at the Suffolk Athletic Club in Boston, Massachusetts, losing in a fifteenth round disqualification. Connolly was disqualified for a punch to the groin of Fenton two minutes and thirty seconds into the fifteenth round. The victory for Fenton over a future Welterweight Champion, even if it was the result of a foul, may have been one of his most notable. Around September 1911, around the age of thirty-eight, Fenton would perform an exhibition bout with the young welterweight Abe "The Newsboy" Hollandersky, a future Panamanian Heavyweight Champion, at the New London County Fair.

== Attempting the World Lightweight Championship against "Kid" Lavigne ==
According to Cyber Boxing Zone, Connolly competed unsuccessfully for the World Lightweight Championship on April 28, 1897, against reigning champion George "Kid" Lavigne in Brooklyn, New York, losing in an eleventh-round technical knockout. In an article by Kid Lavigne in 1927, his win against Connolly in eleven rounds in 1897 was also listed.

On October 27, 1898, Connolly won a bout against Tom Broderick in a tenth-round technical knockout at the Waverly Athletic Club in Yonkers, New York. Broderick, having accidentally had salts thrown in his eyes, was unable to answer the starting bell in the tenth round, and had to forfeit the match. A great deal of money had been wagered on the bout, with Connolly the favorite. The first four rounds saw fierce battling but with fairly even points scoring on both sides. In the fifth, Broderick clipped Connolly's face with straight lefts and right hooks, leaving him exhausted and battered. In the sixth, Connolly staggered Broderick putting him on the mat. On September 4, 1899, Connolly would defeat Broderick in a twenty-round newspaper decision at the Coliseum in Hartford, Connecticut.

On November 26, 1898, Connolly met George Kerwin, a noted lightweight, at the Commercial Athletic Club in St. Louis, Missouri, for a twenty-round draw. The fighting was fierce, but the draw verdict was not protested by the audience. He would defeat Kerwin in a fourth-round technical knockout on May 9, 1899, at the Olympic Athletic Club in Buffalo, New York. Kerwin was the victim of continuous rights and lefts from Connolly, who had the better of the bout from the early rounds. Connolly was finally knocked down by a left to the jaw in the fourth round. Three months later, Kerwin would take the Lightweight Championship of Iowa on August 31 against Jim Sellars.

== Connolly's first bouts with Matty Matthews ==
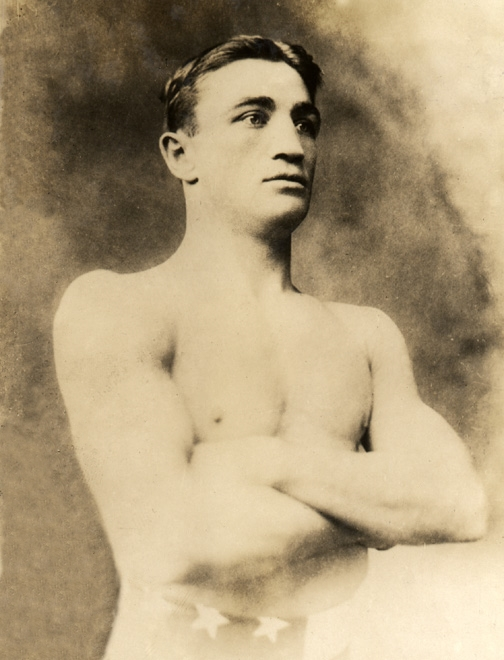
Matty Matthews, Welterweight Champion

On July 31, 1899, Connolly lost to Matty Matthews in New York in a 25-round points decision at the Coney Island Sporting Club. The referee decision was not popular with many in the crowd, but several more knowledgeable observers ringside agreed with the decision.

On October 27, 1899, Connally met Matthews in a twenty-five-round draw at the Broadway Athletic Club in Brooklyn. The fifteenth and the twenty-first rounds were marked by the heaviest battling with Matthews down for a count of five. It was a fierce combat throughout the fight and both men were marked noticeably. At least one reporter felt strongly that Connolly had the better of the bout.

== Ramp up to the World Welterweight Championship ==
In an important win on December 15, 1899, Connolly defeated William "Kid" McPartland in a twenty-five round points decision, again at the Broadway Athletic Club in Brooklyn. Both boxers fought at a weight near 138, close to the lightweight limit. Connolly took the initiative from the early fighting scoring points with lefts to the body, and rights to the head of McPartland. McPartland may have landed heavier blows particularly lefts to the chest and face, but Connolly landed more often, thus winning on points. Connolly never seemed in danger of a knockdown and had McPartland at a safe distance. In 1902, McPartland would contend unsuccessfully for the Lightweight Championship of the World against the great Joe Gans.

On May 15, 1900, he defeated Perry Queenan in a six-round points decision at Tattersall's in Chicago, Illinois. Connolly took the initiative in most of the fighting. Queenan performed better in the fifth and sixth rounds, and appeared to have finished stronger, but the bout was close. Only 1,000 spectators witnessed the bout, a bit of a disappointment. Connolly boxed most effectively in the clinches, and with the frequent clinching in the bout, it appeared both boxers were wary of each other.

== Taking World Welterweight Championship, June 5, 1900 against Matty Matthews ==
Connolly took the World Welterweight Championship in a 25-round points decision on June 5, 1900, against reigning champion Matty Matthews at the Seaside Athletic Club in Brooklyn, New York. It was their fourth meeting. Matthews was down for a count of nine in both the eleventh and eighteenth rounds, in a bout that was described as "the best bout of the four", with Connally winning decisively without ever being knocked to the mat. Matthews was also down shortly before the final bell from a strong right to the face.

=== Losing the World Welterweight Championship to Rube Ferns ===
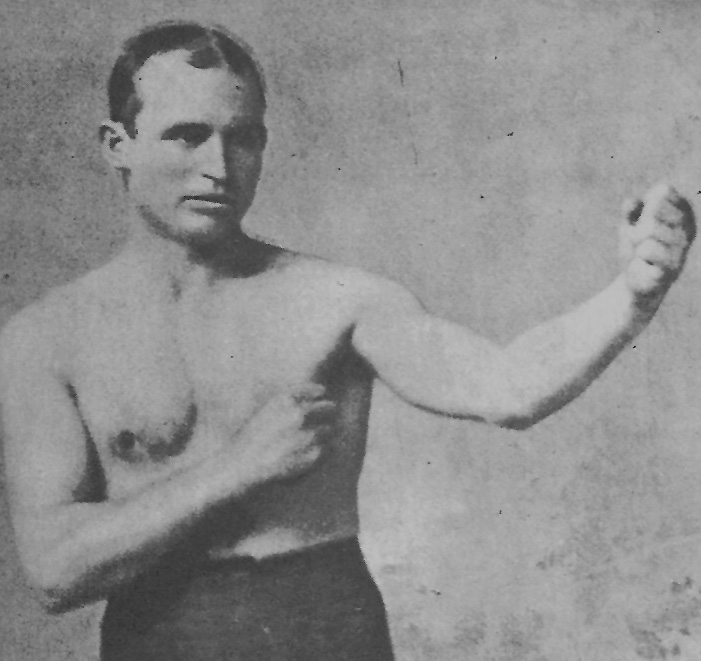
Rube Ferns, Welterweight Champion

On August 13, 1900, he lost the World Welterweight Championship to Rube Ferns, before a crowd of 1800 at the Olympic Club in Buffalo in a fifteenth-round technical knockout of a planned twenty-five. In the final round, Connolly through up his hands after three light shots to the ribs, indicating he could not continue the bout, and his seconds threw in the towel.

On January 6, 1902, Connolly lost to one of the greatest American light and welterweights in American history, the great champion Joe Gans, a black boxer of considerable skill and achievement. Connolly lost in a five-round disqualification at the Washington Sports Club in Philadelphia. One reporter noted that Connolly, "did nothing but hug and wrestle, adding variety to his performance in the third by deliberately trying to butt the Balitmorean (Gans). A head butt is a foul usually resulting in an immediate disqualification. Connolly headbutted Gans as many as three times. The reporter also noted that Connolly clinched frequently and "wrestled" rather than boxed, probably in attempt to protest himself from the fierce assaults of Gans. By the time the referee ended the bout in the fifth, Connolly had been "rendered practically helpless" by the powerful punching of Gans.

On April 18, 1902, he knocked out Barney Connors in four rounds at the Wabash Athletic Club in Chicago, Illinois. Connolly put Connors on the mat for the final count with a right swing to the jaw.

== Boxing in England as a Welterweight ==
On June 21, 1902, he won an important bout against Pat Daly in a fifteen-round points decision at the National Sporting Club in London. The bout was billed as the 144 pound title, making it an important Welterweight battle.

=== Facing English Middleweight Champion Jack Palmer ===
On July 19, and August 23, 1902, Connolly faced boxer Jack Palmer twice at the Ginetts Circus in New Castle, England, losing the first bout in a twenty-round decision, and the second in a sixth-round technical knockout. In their third and final meeting, on November 24, 1902, Connolly lost to Palmer in London at the National Sporting Club in a fifteen rounds points decision. Palmer was considered an English Middleweight Champion at the time of the bout. Palmer took $1000 for the win, with Connolly receiving only $250. The battling was hard and fast throughout. Fighting normally as a welterweight, Connolly may have been outweighed by the middleweight champion. At least three sources considered the bout for the Middleweight Championship of England at 158 pounds, though Connolly, perhaps because of his weight or his status as a resident of America was not eligible to box for the British title.

=== Unsuccessful attempt at the British Empire Welterweight Championship ===
On September 15, 1902, Connolly was defeated by English boxer Tom Woodley in an eleventh round points decision at the Wonderland Club in London. The bout was staged as a match for the British Commonwealth Welterweight Title at 144 pounds. Connolly had the lead until the sixth round when the tide turned and he was nearly knocked out by Woodley, and for the remaining five rounds, Woodley took control, finally winning on points. In a rematch on January 26, 1903, at the National Sporting Club in London, Connolly beat Woodley in a fifteen-round points decision.

== Return to America and retirement from boxing ==
On July 22, and August 10, 1903, he fought two ten-round draws against Jack "Twin" Sullivan in Halifax, Nova Scotia, in his original hometown of Saint John, New Brunswick, in Canada. Though a well known welterweight himself, Jack's twin brother Mike would claim the World Welterweight Championship in 1907.

On January 15, 1904, Connolly ended his career, according to most sources, losing in a first-round technical knockout against Honey Mellody at the Lennox Athletic Club in Boston, Massachusetts. The brief newspaper reports that followed the bout stated simply that "Connolly was outclassed and at the mercy of the Charlestown man (Mellody)." Two years later Mellody would take the World Welterweight Championship against the great Joe Walcott on October 16, 1906.

Coverage of Connolly in American newspapers subsequent to his boxing career was sparse. He died in 1936.

== See also ==
- Lineal championship
- List of welterweight boxing champions

== Boxing achievements ==
Achievements
Preceded by Matty Matthews	World Welterweight Champion; June 5, 1900 – August 13, 1900	Succeeded by Rube Ferns
Preceded by George Addison	Canadian Featherweight Champion; April 3, 1894	Unknown
Preceded by Tom Causer	Commonwealth welterweight champion November 24, 1896	Unknown
