= Olympic Club (New Orleans) =

Private club in New Orleans, Louisiana

The Olympic Club was a private club in 19th-century New Orleans best known for hosting boxing matches.

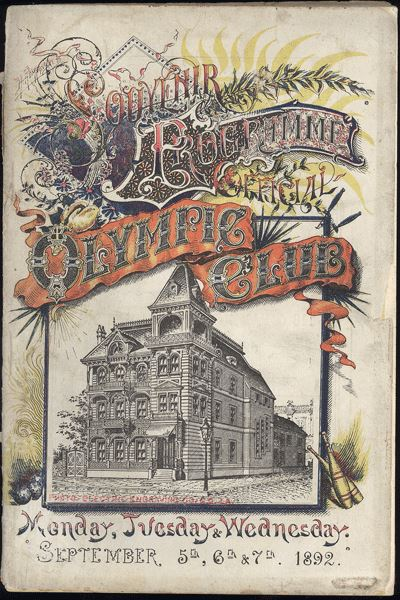
"Souvenir Programme" showing the Olympic Club in 1892

== The venue ==
The club was organized in 1883. With various expansions, the Olympic Club's complex of buildings grew to cover a whole city block in what is now called the Bywater section of New Orleans, at the intersection of Royal Street and Montegut Street. It included a gymnasium and other facilities for members, as well as a large arena lit by electric lighting - still something of a novelty at the time. The original arena seated 3,500; in response to growing success, it was expanded to seat 10,000.

== Events ==
While the club hosted a variety of events, including chess matches, it was by far best known for boxing matches. Sports writer S. Derby Gisclair called it "the epicenter of professional boxing" in the era.

The most famous of boxing matches held at the Olympic Club were a series of World Championship matches held on consecutive days in September of 1892, including Featherweight and Lightweight championship matches cumulating in James J. Corbett defeating John L. Sullivan for the World Heavyweight Championship.

On April 6, 1893, the longest fight in professional boxing history took place at the Olympic Club, as Andy Bowen fought Jack Burke for the Lightweight Championship. The match lasted 110 rounds, over seven hours and 19 minutes (each round lasting three minutes) before referee John Duffy declared a "no contest", both men having become too dazed and tired to come out of their corners.

== End of the Olympic Club ==
The Olympic Club complex burned to the ground in 1897.
