= Matty Matthews =

American boxer (1873–1948)

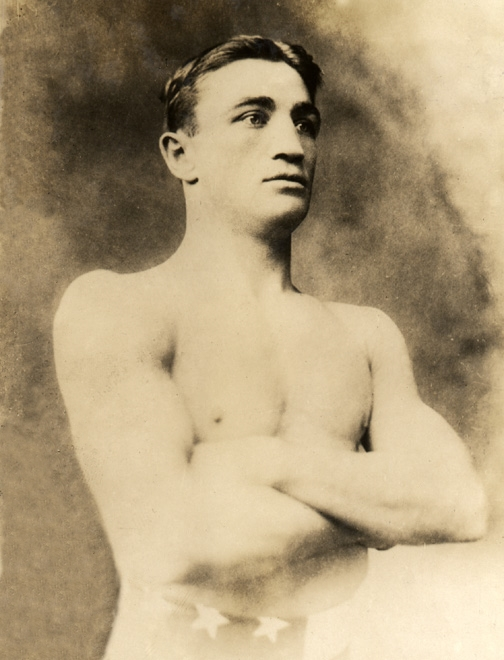

Personal information
- Nationality: American (United States)
- Born: William Robert Matthews; July 13, 1873 New York City
- Died: December 6, 1948 (aged 75) Brooklyn, New York
- Height: 5 ft 7.5 in (1.71 m)
- Weight: Welterweight

Boxing career
- Stance: Orthodox

Boxing record
- Total fights: 101
- Wins: 58
- Win by KO: 25
- Losses: 24
- Draws: 19
- No contests: 0

William "Matty" Matthews (July 13, 1873 – December 6, 1948) was an American boxer of the early 20th century born and raised in New York City. He was the world welterweight champion twice between 1900 and 1901, and was one of the first boxing world champions to regain his crown. Johnny Dunn, also known as a sports announcer, was his primary manager, particularly during his reign as world welterweight champion.

== Early career ==
Matthews was born and raised on the Lower East side of Manhattan near Corlear's Hook, on July 18, 1873, and excelled at baseball as a childhood sport, particularly pitching. In his early life, he gained strength as a truck driver delivering cases of tea. Boxing referee Charley White may have acted as his earliest manager and arranged his first bout with local boxer Johnny Bennis, who he knocked out in telling fashion. He had several jobs in manual labor, at one time building ships in the Brooklyn Navy Yard.

Matthews began boxing around 1893, and by July 1896, had won seven of his better publicized bouts with only one loss and two draws.

=== Important early bouts in the New York area and New England ===
On February 11, 1896, he knocked out Nick Collins in seven rounds at the Palm Athletic Club in New York. Though Collins was not as accomplished a boxer as Matthews would soon face in his career, the win was convincing and helped him to gain recognition.

On October 29, 1896, Matthews knocked out English born boxer Stanton Abbott in the seventh of fifteen rounds at the Empire Athletic Club, in Buffalo, New York before a crowd of around 2,000. According to several sources, Abbott took the English lightweight title at 132 pounds in January 1893 at the National Sporting Club in London. Matthews employed a low crouch in the fight and seemed to be dominant throughout. He overwhelmed his opponent, who at several times seemed to have trouble effectively countering his blows.

On April 10, 1897, Matthews defeated Mike Farragher in a second-round technical knockout at the National Sporting Club in New York. The Brooklyn Daily Eagle wrote that Farragher slipped in the second round avoiding a swing, hitting his head against a post, and was unable to continue, but many in the crowd felt the bout may have been fixed and Farragher's fall was staged. The lights were dimmed as a result of the crowd's reaction, and order prevailed as the crowd filed out under the watch of the police present. The Baltimore Sun wrote that the blow that caused the knockout was a strong right to Farragher's jaw.

On December 21, 1897, Matthews won a twenty-round points decision against Mike Leonard at the Rienzi Athletic Club in Rochester, New York. Leonard faced most of the better welterweights of his day. Matthews had drawn with Leonard the previous year.

Less than a week later, on December 27, 1897, he defeated Owen Ziegler by newspaper decision in a six-round bout at the arena in Philadelphia, Pennsylvania. He defeated him again on May 9, 1898, in a twenty-round points decision at the Opera House in Paterson, New Jersey. Ziegler, a Philadelphia-based boxer, met many of the better light and welterweights of his day including Young Griffo. On December 10, 1898, Ziegler fought a tame twenty-round draw with Matthews at the Queen's City Athletic Club in Toronto, Canada.

On March 31, 1898, he defeated noteworthy lightweight Austin Gibbons at the Opera House in Paterson, New Jersey in a ten-round points decision. In his early career, Gibbons had contended unsuccessfully for the World Lightweight Title against undefeated champion Jack McAuliffe.

On April 20, 1898, he met Tom Broderick at the Waverly Athletic Club in Yonkers, New York. Matthews won the close decision after twenty rounds of fierce, cleanly fought boxing. On May 26, 1898, he defeated Broderick again in a more impressive fourth-round technical knockout at the same location. Broderick was a serious competitor who met many of the top light and welterweight contenders of his day, and Matthew's commanding win convinced many that at twenty-four he was a serious contender for the world welterweight championship.

=== First attempt at the World Welterweight Championship ===
On August 25, 1898, he made his first unsuccessful attempt at the World Welterweight Championship against Mysterious Billy Smith at New York's Lenox Athletic Club, losing in a twenty-five round points decision.

=== Important bouts before taking the World Welterweight Championship ===
On January 19, 1899, he defeated Paddy Fenton at the Waverly Athletic Club in Yonkers, New York on a twenty-round points decision. Fenton was a Connecticut-based light and welterweight who faced many quality welterweights in his career including Stanton Abbott and Tom Broderick. Around the fall of 1911 Fenton faced Abe Hollandersky, at the New London County Fair in an exhibition. Hollandersky would become the Panamanian Heavyweight Champion in May 1913.

On July 10, 1899, he defeated Otto Sieloff at the Coney Island Athletic Club in Brooklyn, New York in a ninth-round technical knockout. The Dollar Weekly News wrote that Matthews "proved too much for his opponent, whom he allowed to be the aggressor while the bout lasted." Matthew's blows were stronger in the first two rounds, though Sieloff landed some blows in the second, but they may have lacked the force of Matthew's stiff lefts and right crosses to the jaw. The bout ended 1:30 into the ninth when Matthews landed a heavy right uppercut to Sieloff's jaw.

On September 14, 1899, Matthews defeated Bobby Dobbs in a twenty-fifth round disqualification at the Coney Island Athletic Club in Brooklyn, New York. Dobbs was an exceptional black welterweight who took the 144 pound British Welterweight Championship in 1898, but never was given the opportunity to contend for the World Welterweight championship in the United States. On December 2, 1899, Matthews defeated another exceptional Black boxer, welterweight Hugh McWinters, in a twenty-round decision at the Pelican Club in Brooklyn.

On February 16, 1900, Matthews defeated Kid McPartland at the Broadway Athletic Club in New York in a seventeenth-round technical knockout. In the one sided affair, McPartland was down twice in the second, and subsequently again in the fourth, thirteenth, fourteenth, and sixteenth, before the referee stopped the fight after the final knockdown twenty-four seconds into the seventeenth round. In the modern era the fight would have been stopped in the third knockdown.

On March 27, 1899, he defeated "Philadelphia" Tommy Ryan in a twenty rounds points decision at the Youngstown Athletic Club in Youngstown, Ohio, though Ryan had a three-inch advantage in reach. Matthews was down in the sixth from a left to the jaw.

== Taking World Welterweight Championship in April 1900, from Billy Smith ==
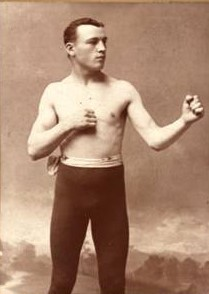
Billy Smith, Welterweight Champion

On April 17, 1900 he took the World Welterweight Championship from Mysterious Billy Smith at the Broadway Athletic Club in New York, knocking him out only twenty eight seconds into the 19th round, before a crowd of 4,000. The final fall to the mat occurred after a solid right hand to the jaw of Smith. Matthews seemed to have the upper hand from the first round, landing more blows, though possibly lacking the force of the blows dealt by Smith. Matthews was down twice in the first round, once from a clinch. The fighting was fast and rather fierce throughout. Smith was a 4 to 1 favorite in the early betting but may have lost some stamina from having to lose a pound prior to the bout to make the required weight of 142.

== Matthew's first meetings with Eddie Connolly ==
On July 31, 1899, Matthews defeated Eddie Connolly in New York in a 25-round points decision at the Coney Island Sporting Club. The referee decision was not popular with many in the crowd, but several more knowledgeable observers ringside agreed with it.

=== Important bouts leading to loss of the Welterweight Championship ===
On August 14, 1899, he defeated George Kerwin in a sixteenth-round technical knockout at Coney Island, in Brooklyn, New York. Kerwin was a talented boxer who would win the Lightweight Championship of Iowa in Dubuque two weeks later. The St. Louis Post Dispatch felt Kerwin had the advantage throughout the bout, and he outweighed Kerwin by twelve pounds.

On October 27, 1899, Matthews met Eddie Connolly again in a twenty-five-round draw at the Broadway Athletic Club in New York. The fifteenth and the twenty-first rounds were marked by the heaviest battling, with Matthews down for a count of five. It was a fierce combat throughout the fight and both men were marked noticeably. At least one reporter felt strongly that Connolly may have had the better of the bout.

On November 20, 1899, Matthews defeated Charley "Rough House" Burns in a fifteen-round points decision at the Ohio Athletic Club, in Cincinnati, Ohio. He had previously beaten Burns on June 21, 1899 in a sixth-round knockout at the welterweight range of 145 pounds in Youngstown, Ohio. Burns was a competent but not exceptional light and welterweight judging from his record.

On April 9, 1900, Matthews defeated New Jersey boxer Dan McConnell in a third-round technical knockout at the Niles Athletic Club in Youngstown, Ohio. The fight was ended when Matthews landed a strong right to the jaw of McConnell. One the same night according to several sources, Matthews defeated Billy Payne at the Niles Athletic Club in Youngstown, Ohio, in a fifteen-round points decision.

On May 4, 1900, he fought a ten-round draw with Kid Parker in Denver, Colorado which a few sources reported as a World Welterweight Title match. The San Francisco Chronicle wrote that Matthews, before an audience of around 2000, connected more often, though not necessarily with more telling blows. In the sixth, Matthews brought down Parker with a telling right, though Parker rose quickly and began delivering jabs and punches. Both boxers finished strong, though both were cut above the eye.

== Loss of the World Welterweight Championship ==
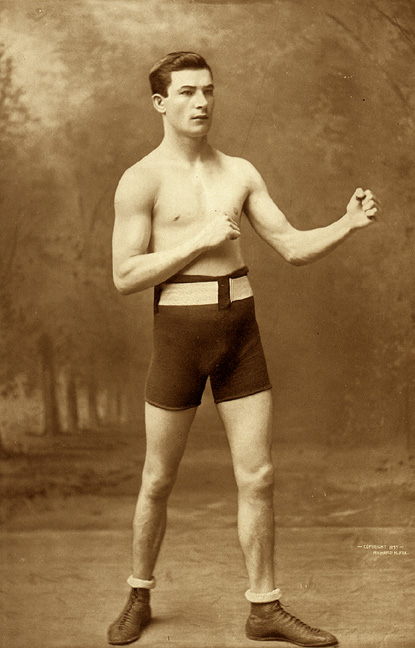
Eddie Connolly

Matthews lost the world welterweight championship in a twenty-five round points decision on June 5, 1900 against contender Eddie Connolly at the Seaside Athletic Club in Brooklyn, New York. It was Matthews and Connolly's fourth meeting. Matthews was down for a count of nine in both the eleventh and eighteenth rounds, in a bout that was described as "the best bout of the four", with Connally winning decisively without ever being knocked to the mat. Matthews was down shortly before the final bell from a strong right to the face. The blow that ended the bout was a left hook by Connolly in the last five seconds of the twenty-fifth round. Matthews was a favorite in the betting at odds of 2 to 1, yet at least according to one source, Connolly outpointed his opponent in nearly every round.

== Retaking the World Welterweight Championship in October 1900, from Rube Ferns ==
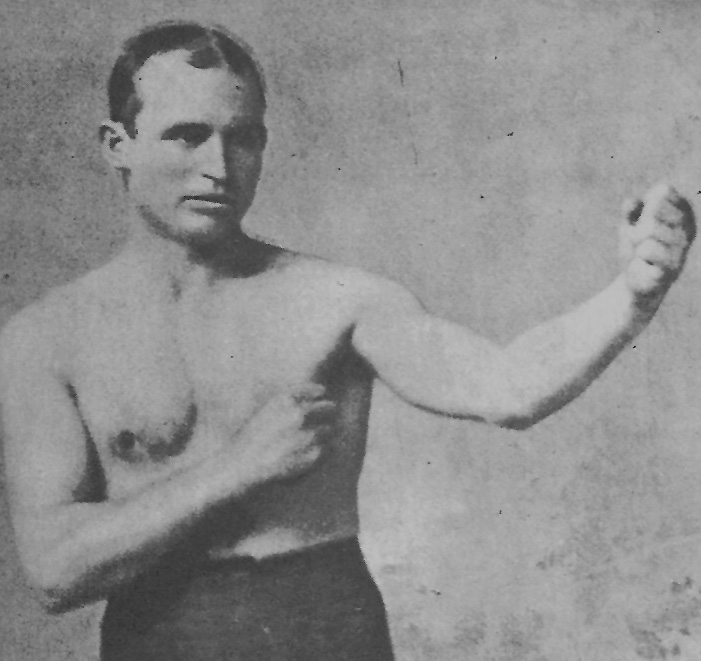
Rube Ferns

Matthews regained the World Welterweight Title from Rube Ferns on October 16, 1900, at the Cadillac Athletic Club in Detroit, Michigan, in a fifteen-round points decision. The Detroit Free Press gave all but two rounds to Ferns, who entered the ring with sores on his shoulder which opened during the bout. Matthews landed solid blows the Ferns in the final fifteenth round, but it was too late to change the points scoring.

== Losing the World Welterweight Championship to Rube Ferns six months after taking it ==
Matthews lost the 142 pound Welterweight Title to Ferns on May 24, 1901 before a crowd of 3000 in a tenth-round knockout at the Mutual Street Rink in Ontario, Canada. Matthews was leading on points up until the tenth round, when Ferns downed him with two lefts to the jaw. Upon rising, Ferns finished Matthews with a strong right. Matthews seemed to show greater speed in the bout, which may have accounted for his higher points scoring, and had Ferns bleeding from the nose through most of the bout.

On December 29, 1903, Matthews knocked out Isadore Strauss in the second round at the Southern Athletic Club in Philadelphia, Pennsylvania. Strauss had fought such well known boxers as Philadelphia Jack O'Brien, Rube Ferns, and Joe Gans in 1897. Matthews had previously beaten Strauss on January 8, 1900, in a round twelve Technical Knockout at the Hercules Athletic Club in Brooklyn. Strauss was down three times in the bout. In the final round of the January bout, Matthews landed continuous hooks and swings to the body of Strauss that resulted in the knockout, though Strauss seemed to have fought better in the early rounds. By the final round of the January bout, Strauss was so exhausted his knees may have buckled as many as four times, and at a few points in the match he was fatigued enough that he slipped to the mat avoiding the blows of Matthews.

On March 16, 1906, near the end of his boxing career, Matthews was knocked out by Rube Ferns in the ninth round at the International Athletic Club in Buffalo, New York. According to the Boston Globe, on August 19, 1908, Matthew's last bout was likely a six-round newspaper decision against Patsy Sweeney at Ulmer Park, in Brooklyn, New York.

== Life and work after boxing ==
In his early career, he worked briefly as a sparring partner for friend and great British born welter and middleweight boxer Tommy West, who ran a boxing school in Brooklyn. West faced the great champion Joe Walcott several times, as well as Tommy Ryan, and Mysterious Billy Smith.

He had jobs in construction and carpentry, and by 1918 was working as a shipbuilder for Morse's shipyard. By 1915, he had already begun work as a stage carpenter.

Like many boxers, Matthews worked in the entertainment industry in his retirement, and once entertained audiences riding a diving horse into a tank at the New York Hippodrome. He worked in several capacities at the Hippodrome including Doorman as late as 1923. He worked briefly as a traveling stage actor after winning the welterweight championship. In his later years he worked as a scene shifter in theaters. At 70 in 1944, he was an official of the Theatrical Carpenter's Union, and a foreman of carpenters for a New York theatrical chain. His long life may partially be explained by rarely having overindulged in alcohol according to several sources, though he was known to on occasion smoke a pipe. He was not reported to have fallen victim to a gambling habit like many successful boxers.

Matthews died in a Brooklyn Hospital on December 5, 1948. He lived a great deal of his life after boxing on 54th street in the Brooklyn area, not far from his place of birth. He left six children, the oldest around 54.

== Achievements ==
Achievements
Preceded by Mysterious Billy Smith	World Welterweight Champion; April 17, 1900 – June 5, 1900	Succeeded by Eddie Connolly
Preceded by Rube Ferns	World Welterweight Champion; October 16, 1900 – May 24, 1901	Succeeded by Rube Ferns
Sporting positions
Preceded by Tommy Ryan	Oldest living world champion August 3 – December 6, 1948	Succeeded by Rube Ferns

== See also ==
- Lineal championship
- List of welterweight boxing champions
