= Jack Burke (boxer) =

American boxer

"Texas" Jack Burke
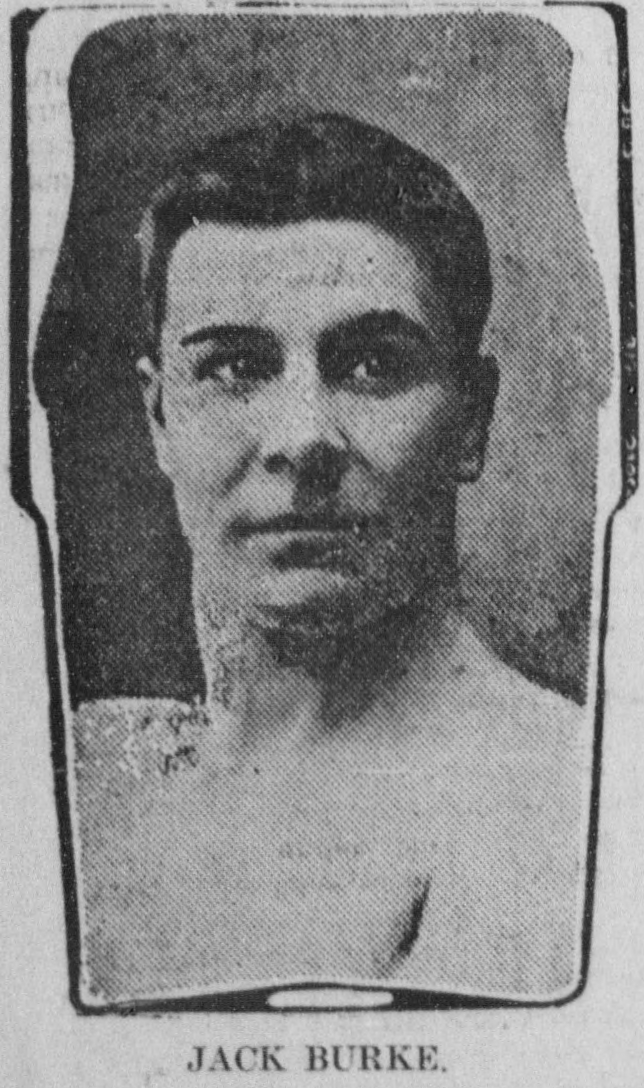
- Jack Burke on February 10, 1904.

Personal information
- Nickname: Texas
- Nationality: (United States)
- Born: January 1, 1869 Chicago, Illinois, United States
- Died: October 25, 1913 (aged 44) Mublenberg Hospital
- Height: 5 ft 7 in (170 cm)
- Weight: Lightweight

Boxing career
- Stance: Orthodox

Boxing record
- Total fights: 12
- Wins: 5
- Win by KO: 4
- Losses: 3
- Draws: 4
- No contests: 1

Jack Burke (January 1, 1869 – October 25, 1913) was a boxer who fought in the longest gloved ring battle on record.

Burke went 110 rounds with Andy Bowen at the Olympic Club in New Orleans on April 6, 1893, in a bout which lasted 7 hours and 19 minutes. The marathon fight was called a "no contest" by referee John Duffy when neither man could continue. Burke broke all the bones in both of his hands and remained bed ridden for 6 weeks after the fight. Burke considered retiring after the fight, but chose to continue competing. Andy Bowen had originally scheduled the fight with another opponent, however after dropping out of the fight, Jack Burke, who was the latter's trainer, fought the bout instead.

It was reported that the fight went for so long, that the spectators who stayed to watch the fight had fallen asleep in their seats. It was also recorded that at round 108, with no clear end in sight, referee John Duffy made the decision that if no winner had emerged in the next 2 rounds, the bout would be ruled a no contest.

"Texas" Jack Burke died at Mublenberg Hospital in October 1913 at the age of 44.
