= Mike "Twin" Sullivan =

American boxer (1878-1937)

Personal information
- Nationality: Irish American (United States)
- Born: Michael Sullivan; September 23, 1878 Cambridge, Massachusetts
- Died: October 31, 1937 (aged 59) Massachusetts
- Height: 5 ft 10 in (178 cm)
- Weight: Welterweight

Boxing career
- Stance: Orthodox

Boxing record
- Total fights: 63
- Wins: 35
- Win by KO: 17
- Losses: 10
- Draws: 18

Mike "Twin" Sullivan (September 23, 1878 – October 31, 1937) was an American boxer credited with taking the Welterweight Championship of the World on April 23, 1907, when he soundly defeated William "Honey" Mellody in Los Angeles in a twenty-round bout. He vacated the title in the late fall of 1908, when he could not make weight.

He had an impressive knockout percentage and record and fought some of the greatest boxers of his era including Joe Gans, while he was the reigning lightweight champion, as well as welterweight champion Harry Lewis, and leading welterweight contenders Jimmy Clabby, and Jimmy Gardner whom he defeated.

== Early career ==
Mike "Twin" Sullivan was born in Cambridge, Massachusetts, on September 23, 1878, and resided in neighboring Boston for much of his career. He had a twin brother Jack, the origin of his nickname, "twin", and was the youngest in an Irish family of several siblings. His twin Jack was an accomplished middleweight boxer as well, once claiming the Middleweight Championship of the World when he defeated Tommy Burns on March 7, 1905. Jack fought top talent as did Mike, and they shared a few of the same opponents. His brother Dan was a less well known boxer.

The "Twin" began his career around March 25, 1901, by defeating Jack Dwyer in Boston, Massachusetts in ten rounds. The following month he beat Belfield Wallcott, brother of Joe, at the same Business Man's Athletic Club in Boston in another ten-round bout.

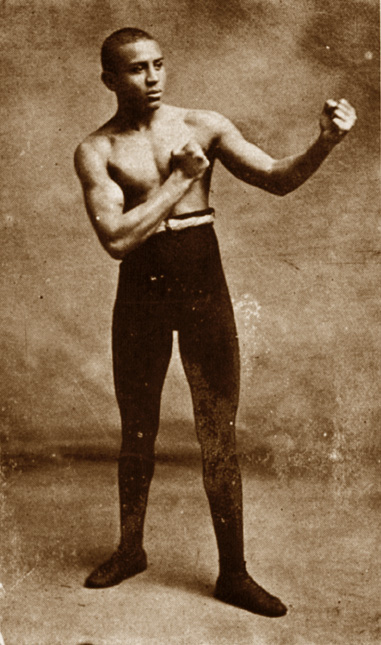
Joe Gans, Lightweight Champion

Sullivan had three historic bouts with Hall of Famer and reigning lightweight champion Joe Gans, in September 1905 and January and March 1906 with the first in Maryland and the last two in San Francisco and Los Angeles. Significantly, Sullivan lost the last two bouts to the lightweight champion by knockout and technical knockout, though their first bout was a close draw. In the San Francisco fight, Sullivan's first sanctioned Welterweight World Title match according to BoxRec, Gans won by knockout in the fifteenth of twenty rounds. In an important note, the Rock Island Argus wrote of the San Francisco fight, "Gans showed wonderful form and was easily the master of his white antagonist at all times." It did allow that the first three rounds were fairly even fighting. After his fights with Gans, Sullivan met Rube Smith, an accomplished welterweight contender three times in April, July, and August 1906 in Colorado, winning in an eighteenth round knockout in April, but drawing in the other two matches.

Sullivan lost to future welterweight Harry Lewis on February 21, 1907, in a ten-round points decision in Denver. Lewis would use this victory and his subsequent knockout of Honey Mellody one year later on April 20, 1908, to establish what most boxing historians consider a legitimate claim to the World Welterweight Title. Many boxing sanctioning organization today simply fail to list World Welterweight champions prior to 1910 or 1915, as most of these organizations did not exist during that period, and there was less widespread recognition of world champions.

== Winning the Welterweight World Title ==
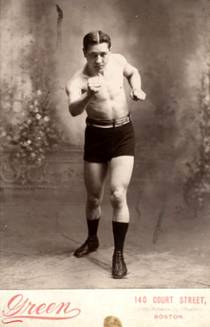
Honey Mellody, World Welterweight Champ

Sullivan met Honey Mellody, probably in his most historic bout, on April 23, 1907, in a Welterweight World Title match in Naud Junction Pavilion in Los Angeles. He won the twenty round bout refereed by Charles Ayton. The Shreveport Caucasian wrote of the bout, "At all stages Sullivan showed unmistakable superiority and out generated Mellody in infighting. Mellody's tactics were confined to rushes generally ending in clinches where Sullivan used right upper cuts and short hand jabs to the face with telling effect". The Washington Evening Star noted that "during the early rounds Mellody had an even break with his clever opponent", but "Sullivan came back strong and from the twelfth had it all his own way." "The "Twin" was immediately recognized as a World Champion in the state of California, and has since been recognized widely by American boxing historians including widely recognized authority Nat Fleischer and a host of newspapers. Sullivan relinquished the title around October or November 1908 according to BoxRec as he was above the welterweight limit.

== Boxing two leading welterweight contenders ==
He fought Jimmy Gardner, a welterweight contender at least four times. Gardner was another welterweight during the period who attempted to claim the world title as his own. They met on December 18, 1902, and January 27, 1903, with one fifteen round draw, and one five round newspaper win. On November 24, 1905, he beat Gardner on points in 20 rounds in San Francisco. He beat Gardner again in what was deemed a Welterweight Title match on April 22, 1908, in a 25- round points decision at Jeffries Arena in Vernon, California, with the legendary heavyweight ex-champion Jim Jeffries as referee. Sullivan fought Gardner again on November 29, 1909, at the Grand Opera House in New Haven, Connecticut, in a 12-round draw by newspaper decision of the Boston Globe.

Sullivan fought Jimmy Clabby on February 4, 1910, at the National Athletic Club in Milwaukee, Wisconsin in a ten round draw by newspaper decision. According to the Calumet News, Sullivan was ten pounds heavier than Clabby, demonstrating that Sullivan was fighting above the Welterweight limit, and according to BoxRec had been fighting above the Welterweight limit since around December 1908. Clabby was a serious contender for the Welterweight Championship himself, and one of several boxers who believed he had a claim to it in later years, though his claim was never widely recognized. Sullivan fought Clabby again on June 3, 1911, in Buffalo, in a close ten round bout that the Buffalo Times, wrote Clabby had a "slight shade," implying he won by a small margin.

== World Middleweight Title bout with Stanley Ketchel ==
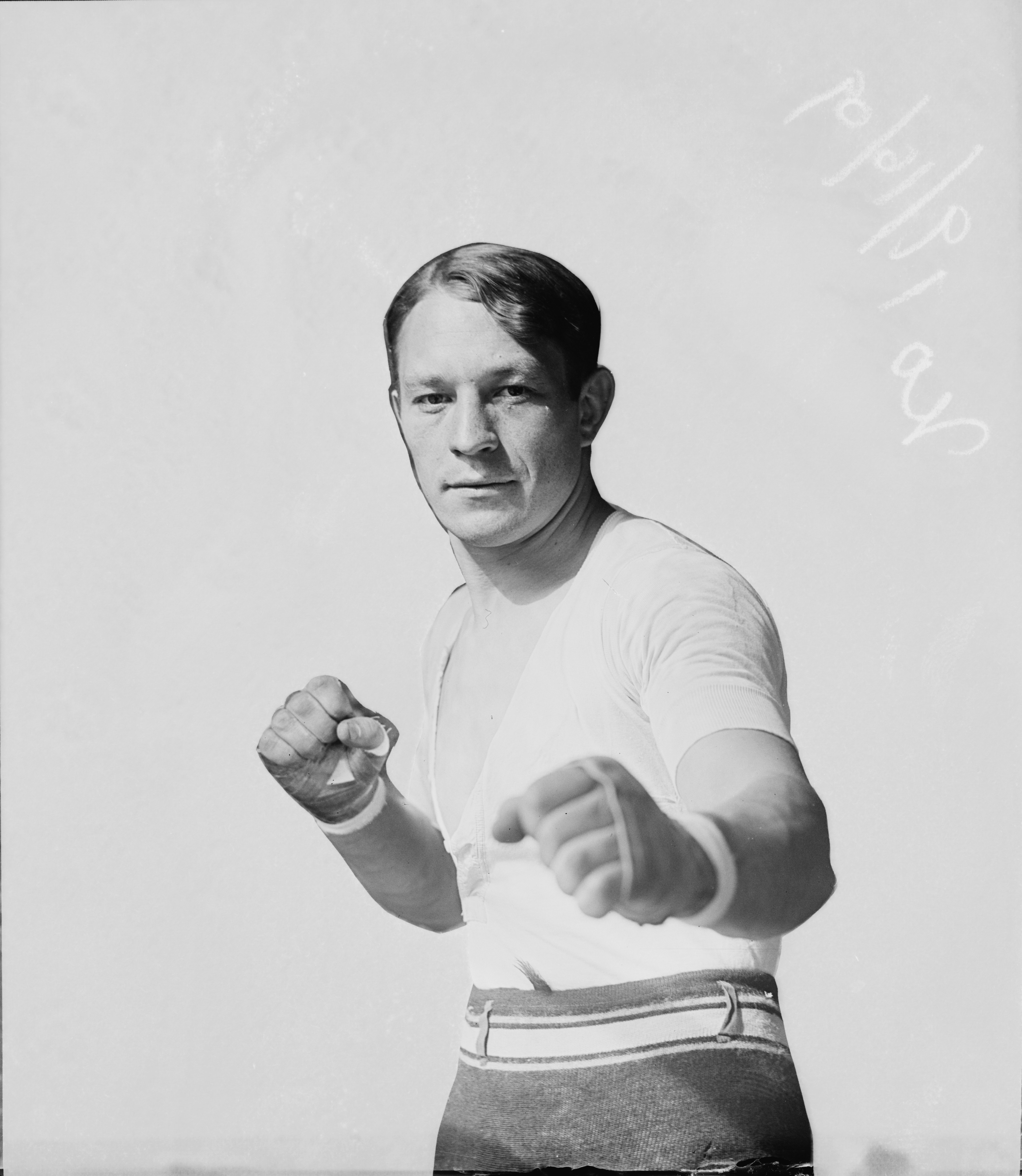
Stanley Ketchell

Fighting as a light middleweight at 150 pounds, he lost a Middleweight Title Bout against reigning Middleweight Champion Stanley Ketchel by first round knockout, on February 22, 1908, at Mission Street Arena in Colma, California. It was rare for Sullivan to lose by knockout, and made the bout more memorable for supporters of Ketchel. Some boxing critics believe that Sullivan's career began a slow descent after this loss.

On September 1, 1910, Sullivan fought a bout with contender Paddy Lavin, which resulted in a draw. There was an edge by Sullivan in the ten round bout in Buffalo, New York, according to the Los Angeles Herald of September 3. Sullivan showed his power, knocking Lavin to the canvas for a count of eight in the first round. The two fought another ten round bout at the same location on October 6, with the Buffalo Times giving their decision for both fights to Sullivan.

== Official Professional boxing record ==
63 fights	28 wins	6 losses
By knockout	17	5
By decision	11	1
Draws	16	
Newspaper decisions/draws	13	

All Newspaper decisions are regarded as “no decision” bouts as they have “resulted in neither boxer winning or losing, and would therefore not count as part of their official fight record."

No.	Result	Record	Opponent	Type	Round	Date	Location	Notes
63	Loss	27–6–16 (12)	Roddy MacDonald	KO	4 (12)	Feb 15, 1914	Halifax, Nova Scotia, Canada	
62	Draw	27–5–16 (12)	Mickey MacIntyre	PTS	12	Jan 1, 1914	Glace Bay, Nova Scotia, Canada	
61	Win	27–5–15 (12)	Paddy Lavin Imposter	KO	2 (10)	Dec 15, 1913	American Hall, Dover, New Hampshire, U.S.	
60	Win	26–5–15 (12)	Joe Geary	NWS	6	Nov 14, 1913	Portland, Maine, U.S.	
59	Win	26–5–15 (11)	Jack Tresser	KO	4 (10)	Jan 22, 1913	Saint John, New Brunswick, Canada	
58	Win	25–5–15 (11)	Jim Kince	KO	5 (10)	Jan 5, 1913	Saint John, New Brunswick, Canada	
57	Win	25–5–15 (11)	Joe Baker	KO	1 (10)	Dec 20, 1912	Saint John, New Brunswick, Canada	
56	Loss	24–5–15 (11)	Kid Henry	TKO	2 (10)	Jun 12, 1911	Knickerbocker A.C., Albany, New York, U.S.	
55	Loss	24–4–15 (11)	Jimmy Clabby	NWS	10	Jun 3, 1911	International A.C., Buffalo, New York, U.S.	
54	Loss	24–4–15 (10)	Jack Dillon	NWS	10	Mar 17, 1911	International A.C., Buffalo, New York, U.S.	
53	Loss	24–4–15 (9)	Bob Moha	NWS	10	Mar 10, 1911	Shubert Theater, Milwaukee, Wisconsin, U.S.	
52	Win	24–4–15 (8)	Dixie Kid	NWS	10	Jan 17, 1911	Harmonia Hall, Buffalo, New York, U.S.	
51	Win	24–4–15 (7)	Young Loughrey	NWS	10	Jan 2, 1911	International A.C., Buffalo, New York, U.S.	
50	Win	24–4–15 (7)	Paddy Lavin	NWS	10	Oct 6, 1910	International A.C., Buffalo, New York, U.S.	
49	Win	24–4–15 (6)	Paddy Lavin	NWS	10	Sep 1, 1910	International A.C., Buffalo, New York, U.S.	
48	Win	24–4–15 (5)	Dennis Tighe	NWS	10	Aug 25, 1910	Scranton, Pennsylvania, U.S.	
47	Draw	24–4–15 (4)	Jimmy Clabby	NWS	10	Feb 4, 1910	National A.C., Milwaukee, Wisconsin, U.S.	
46	Draw	24–4–15 (3)	Jimmy Gardner	NWS	12	Nov 29, 1909	Grand Opera House, New Haven, Connecticut, U.S.	
45	Win	24–4–15 (2)	Terry Martin	PTS	12	Sep 21, 1909	Armory A.A., Boston, Massachusetts, U.S.	
44	Draw	23–4–15 (2)	Harry 'Kid' Krantz	PTS	6	Jul 13, 1909	Piedmont Pavilion, Oakland, California, U.S.	
43	Draw	23–4–14 (2)	Kyle Whitney	TKO	8 (10)	May 25, 1909	Dreamland Pavilion, San Francisco, California, U.S.	
42	Win	23–4–13 (2)	Allen Mahoney	TKO	8 (10)	Nov 5, 1908	Halifax, Nova Scotia, Canada	
41	Win	22–4–13 (2)	Tom Foley	PTS	10	Jul 23, 1908	Sydney, Nova Scotia, Canada	
40	Win	21–4–13 (2)	Jimmy Gardner	PTS	25	Apr 22, 1908	Jeffries' Arena, Vernon, California, U.S.	Retained world welterweight title
39	Loss	20–4–13 (2)	Stanley Ketchel	KO	1 (25)	Feb 22, 1908	Mission Street Arena, Colma, California, U.S.	For world middleweight title
38	Win	20–3–13 (2)	Kid Farmer	KO	13 (20)	Nov 27, 1907	Naud Junction Pavilion, Los Angeles, California, U.S.	Retained world welterweight title
37	Win	19–3–13 (2)	Frank Fields	TKO	20 (20)	Oct 31, 1907	Goldfield, Nevada, U.S.	
36	Win	18–3–13 (2)	William "Honey" Mellody	PTS	20	Apr 23, 1907	Naud Junction Pavilion, Los Angeles, California, U.S.	Won world welterweight title
35	Loss	17–3–13 (2)	Harry Lewis	PTS	10	Mar 21, 1907	Denver, Colorado, U.S.	
34	Win	17–2–13 (2)	Jack Dougherty	KO	19 (20)	Sep 3, 1906	Butte, Montana, U.S.	
33	Draw	16–2–13 (2)	Rube Smith	PTS	20	Aug 15, 1906	Denver, Colorado, U.S.	
32	Draw	16–2–12 (2)	Rube Smith	PTS	10	Jul 3, 1906	Pueblo, Colorado, U.S.	
31	Win	16–2–11 (2)	Rube Smith	KO	18 (20)	Apr 18, 1906	Pueblo, Colorado, U.S.	
30	Loss	15–2–11 (2)	Joe Gans	TKO	10 (20)	Mar 17, 1906	Chutes Park, Los Angeles, California, U.S.	For world welterweight title claim at 142lbs
29	Loss	15–1–11 (2)	Joe Gans	KO	15 (20)	Jan 19, 1906	Woodward's Pavilion, San Francisco, California, U.S.	For a claim to the world welterweight title at 142lbs
28	Win	15–0–11 (2)	Jimmy Gardner	PTS	20	Nov 24, 1905	Woodward's Pavilion, San Francisco, California, U.S.	
27	Draw	14–0–11 (2)	Joe Gans	PTS	15	Sep 15, 1905	Lyric Theater, Baltimore, Maryland, U.S.	For world lightweight title
26	Win	14–0–10 (2)	Beth McCloud	TKO	6 (15)	Jul 19, 1905	Saint John, New Brunswick, Canada	
25	Win	13–0–10 (2)	Tom Corcoran	KO	4 (10)	Apr 27, 1905	Portland, Maine, U.S.	
24	Win	12–0–10 (2)	Otto Sieloff	TKO	5 (12)	Mar 24, 1905	City Hall, Lewiston, Maine, U.S.	
23	Win	11–0–10 (2)	Joe Angeli	TKO	7 (10)	Sep 30, 1904	Woodward's Pavilion, San Francisco, California, U.S.	
22	Win	10–0–10 (2)	Gus Gardner	TKO	10 (15)	May 16, 1904	Burt's Opera House, Toledo, Ohio, U.S.	
21	Win	9–0–10 (2)	Sammy Phillips	KO	5 (10)	May 12, 1904	West End A.C., Saint Louis, Missouri, U.S.	
20	Win	8–0–10 (2)	Billy Moore	PTS	6	Apr 8, 1904	Battery D Armory, Chicago, Illinois, U.S.	
19	Win	7–0–10 (2)	Dick Fitzpatrick	PTS	6	Mar 26, 1904	Chicago A.C., Chicago, Illinois, U.S.	
18	Draw	6–0–10 (2)	Jack Blackburn	PTS	15	Dec 31, 1903	Chelsea A.C., Chelsea, Massachusetts, U.S.	
17	Loss	6–0–9 (2)	Willie Fitzgerald	NWS	6	Nov 14, 1903	National A.C., Philadelphia, Pennsylvania, U.S.	
16	Draw	6–0–9 (1)	George "Elbows" McFadden	PTS	10	Mar 24, 1903	Criterion A.C., Boston, Massachusetts, U.S.	Prearranged draw
15	Draw	6–0–8 (1)	Belfield Walcott	PTS	10	Feb 24, 1903	Health & Physical Culture A.C., Boston, Massachusetts, U.S.	Prearranged draw
14	Win	6–0–7 (1)	Jimmy Gardner	NWS	5	Jan 27, 1903	Bay State A.C., Boston, Massachusetts, U.S.	
13	Draw	6–0–7	Jimmy Gardner	PTS	15	Dec 18, 1902	Alameda, Bath, Maine, U.S.	
12	Draw	6–0–6	Belfield Walcott	PTS	15	Sep 23, 1902	Alameda, Bath, Maine, U.S.	
11	Draw	6–0–5	Belfield Walcott	PTS	15	Sep 16, 1902	Bath, Maine, U.S.	
10	Draw	6–0–4	Jack Carrig	PTS	10	Jul 3, 1902	Cambridge A.A., Cambridge, Massachusetts, U.S.	
9	Win	6–0–3	Dan Littlejohn	TKO	9 (15)	Jun 25, 1902	Saint John, New Brunswick, Canada	
8	Win	5–0–3	Arthur Cote	PTS	15	May 9, 1902	National Hall, Biddeford, Maine, U.S.	
7	Draw	4–0–3	Billy Gardner	PTS	6	May 5, 1902	Bowdoin Square A.C., Boston, Massachusetts, U.S.	
6	Draw	4–0–2	Tim Kearns	PTS	6	Apr 19, 1902	Lenox A.C., Boston, Massachusetts, U.S.	
5	Draw	4–0–1	Arthur Cote	PTS	15	Apr 17, 1902	Lewiston, Maine, U.S.	
4	Win	4–0	Jack McKeever	TKO	14 (15)	Jan 21, 1902	Bath, Maine, U.S.	
3	Win	3–0	Joe Flaherty	PTS	6	Jan 20, 1902	Lenox A.C., Boston, Massachusetts, U.S.	
2	Win	2–0	Belfield Walcott	PTS	10	Apr 8, 1901	Business Men's A.C., Boston, Massachusetts, U.S.	
1	Win	1–0	Jack Dwyer	PTS	10	Mar 25, 1901	Business Men's A.C., Boston, Massachusetts, U.S.	

== Unofficial Professional boxing record ==
63 fights	35 wins	10 losses
By knockout	17	5
By decision	18	5
Draws	18	

Record with the inclusion of Newspaper decisions to the win/loss/draw column.

No.	Result	Record	Opponent	Type	Round	Date	Location	Notes
63	Loss	35–10–18	Roddy MacDonald	KO	4 (12)	Feb 15, 1914	Halifax, Nova Scotia, Canada	
62	Draw	35–9–18	Mickey MacIntyre	PTS	12	Jan 1, 1914	Glace Bay, Nova Scotia, Canada	
61	Win	35–9–17	Paddy Lavin Imposter	KO	2 (10)	Dec 15, 1913	American Hall, Dover, New Hampshire, U.S.	
60	Win	34–9–17	Joe Geary	NWS	6	Nov 14, 1913	Portland, Maine, U.S.	
59	Win	33–9–17	Jack Tresser	KO	4 (10)	Jan 22, 1913	Saint John, New Brunswick, Canada	
58	Win	32–9–17	Jim Kince	KO	5 (10)	Jan 5, 1913	Saint John, New Brunswick, Canada	
57	Win	31–9–17	Joe Baker	KO	1 (10)	Dec 20, 1912	Saint John, New Brunswick, Canada	
56	Loss	30–9–17	Kid Henry	TKO	2 (10)	Jun 12, 1911	Knickerbocker A.C., Albany, New York, U.S.	
55	Loss	30–8–17	Jimmy Clabby	NWS	10	Jun 3, 1911	International A.C., Buffalo, New York, U.S.	
54	Loss	30–7–17	Jack Dillon	NWS	10	Mar 17, 1911	International A.C., Buffalo, New York, U.S.	
53	Loss	30–6–17	Bob Moha	NWS	10	Mar 10, 1911	Shubert Theater, Milwaukee, Wisconsin, U.S.	
52	Win	30–5–17	Dixie Kid	NWS	10	Jan 17, 1911	Harmonia Hall, Buffalo, New York, U.S.	
51	Win	29–5–17	Young Loughrey	NWS	10	Jan 2, 1911	International A.C., Buffalo, New York, U.S.	
50	Win	28–5–17	Paddy Lavin	NWS	10	Oct 6, 1910	International A.C., Buffalo, New York, U.S.	
49	Win	27–5–17	Paddy Lavin	NWS	10	Sep 1, 1910	International A.C., Buffalo, New York, U.S.	
48	Win	26–5–17	Dennis Tighe	NWS	10	Aug 25, 1910	Scranton, Pennsylvania, U.S.	
47	Draw	25–5–17	Jimmy Clabby	NWS	10	Feb 4, 1910	National A.C., Milwaukee, Wisconsin, U.S.	
46	Draw	25–5–16	Jimmy Gardner	NWS	12	Nov 29, 1909	Grand Opera House, New Haven, Connecticut, U.S.	
45	Win	25–5–15	Terry Martin	PTS	12	Sep 21, 1909	Armory A.A., Boston, Massachusetts, U.S.	
44	Draw	24–5–15	Harry 'Kid' Krantz	PTS	6	Jul 13, 1909	Piedmont Pavilion, Oakland, California, U.S.	
43	Draw	24–5–14	Kyle Whitney	TKO	8 (10)	May 25, 1909	Dreamland Pavilion, San Francisco, California, U.S.	
42	Win	24–5–13	Allen Mahoney	TKO	8 (10)	Nov 5, 1908	Halifax, Nova Scotia, Canada	
41	Win	23–5–13	Tom Foley	PTS	10	Jul 23, 1908	Sydney, Nova Scotia, Canada	
40	Win	22–5–13	Jimmy Gardner	PTS	25	Apr 22, 1908	Jeffries' Arena, Vernon, California, U.S.	Retained world welterweight title
39	Loss	21–5–13	Stanley Ketchel	KO	1 (25)	Feb 22, 1908	Mission Street Arena, Colma, California, U.S.	For world middleweight title
38	Win	21–4–13	Kid Farmer	KO	13 (20)	Nov 27, 1907	Naud Junction Pavilion, Los Angeles, California, U.S.	Retained world welterweight title
37	Win	20–4–13	Frank Fields	TKO	20 (20)	Oct 31, 1907	Goldfield, Nevada, U.S.	
36	Win	19–4–13	William "Honey" Mellody	PTS	20	Apr 23, 1907	Naud Junction Pavilion, Los Angeles, California, U.S.	Won world welterweight title
35	Loss	18–4–13	Harry Lewis	PTS	10	Mar 21, 1907	Denver, Colorado, U.S.	
34	Win	18–3–13	Jack Dougherty	KO	19 (20)	Sep 3, 1906	Butte, Montana, U.S.	
33	Draw	17–3–13	Rube Smith	PTS	20	Aug 15, 1906	Denver, Colorado, U.S.	
32	Draw	17–3–12	Rube Smith	PTS	10	Jul 3, 1906	Pueblo, Colorado, U.S.	
31	Win	17–3–11	Rube Smith	KO	18 (20)	Apr 18, 1906	Pueblo, Colorado, U.S.	
30	Loss	16–3–11	Joe Gans	TKO	10 (20)	Mar 17, 1906	Chutes Park, Los Angeles, California, U.S.	For world welterweight title claim at 142lbs
29	Loss	16–2–11	Joe Gans	KO	15 (20)	Jan 19, 1906	Woodward's Pavilion, San Francisco, California, U.S.	For a claim to the world welterweight title at 142lbs
28	Win	16–1–11	Jimmy Gardner	PTS	20	Nov 24, 1905	Woodward's Pavilion, San Francisco, California, U.S.	
27	Draw	15–1–11	Joe Gans	PTS	15	Sep 15, 1905	Lyric Theater, Baltimore, Maryland, U.S.	For world lightweight title
26	Win	15–1–10	Beth McCloud	TKO	6 (15)	Jul 19, 1905	Saint John, New Brunswick, Canada	
25	Win	14–1–10	Tom Corcoran	KO	4 (10)	Apr 27, 1905	Portland, Maine, U.S.	
24	Win	13–1–10	Otto Sieloff	TKO	5 (12)	Mar 24, 1905	City Hall, Lewiston, Maine, U.S.	
23	Win	12–1–10	Joe Angeli	TKO	7 (10)	Sep 30, 1904	Woodward's Pavilion, San Francisco, California, U.S.	
22	Win	11–1–10	Gus Gardner	TKO	10 (15)	May 16, 1904	Burt's Opera House, Toledo, Ohio, U.S.	
21	Win	10–1–10	Sammy Phillips	KO	5 (10)	May 12, 1904	West End A.C., Saint Louis, Missouri, U.S.	
20	Win	9–1–10	Billy Moore	PTS	6	Apr 8, 1904	Battery D Armory, Chicago, Illinois, U.S.	
19	Win	8–1–10	Dick Fitzpatrick	PTS	6	Mar 26, 1904	Chicago A.C., Chicago, Illinois, U.S.	
18	Draw	7–1–10	Jack Blackburn	PTS	15	Dec 31, 1903	Chelsea A.C., Chelsea, Massachusetts, U.S.	
17	Loss	7–1–9	Willie Fitzgerald	NWS	6	Nov 14, 1903	National A.C., Philadelphia, Pennsylvania, U.S.	
16	Draw	7–0–9	George "Elbows" McFadden	PTS	10	Mar 24, 1903	Criterion A.C., Boston, Massachusetts, U.S.	Pre-arranged draw if no KO
15	Draw	7–0–8	Belfield Walcott	PTS	10	Feb 24, 1903	Health & Physical Culture A.C., Boston, Massachusetts, U.S.	Pre-arranged draw if no KO
14	Win	7–0–7	Jimmy Gardner	NWS	5	Jan 27, 1903	Bay State A.C., Boston, Massachusetts, U.S.	
13	Draw	6–0–7	Jimmy Gardner	PTS	15	Dec 18, 1902	Alameda, Bath, Maine, U.S.	
12	Draw	6–0–6	Belfield Walcott	PTS	15	Sep 23, 1902	Alameda, Bath, Maine, U.S.	
11	Draw	6–0–5	Belfield Walcott	PTS	15	Sep 16, 1902	Bath, Maine, U.S.	
10	Draw	6–0–4	Jack Carrig	PTS	10	Jul 3, 1902	Cambridge A.A., Cambridge, Massachusetts, U.S.	
9	Win	6–0–3	Dan Littlejohn	TKO	9 (15)	Jun 25, 1902	Saint John, New Brunswick, Canada	
8	Win	5–0–3	Arthur Cote	PTS	15	May 9, 1902	National Hall, Biddeford, Maine, U.S.	
7	Draw	4–0–3	Billy Gardner	PTS	6	May 5, 1902	Bowdoin Square A.C., Boston, Massachusetts, U.S.	
6	Draw	4–0–2	Tim Kearns	PTS	6	Apr 19, 1902	Lenox A.C., Boston, Massachusetts, U.S.	
5	Draw	4–0–1	Arthur Cote	PTS	15	Apr 17, 1902	Lewiston, Maine, U.S.	
4	Win	4–0	Jack McKeever	TKO	14 (15)	Jan 21, 1902	Bath, Maine, U.S.	
3	Win	3–0	Joe Flaherty	PTS	6	Jan 20, 1902	Lenox A.C., Boston, Massachusetts, U.S.	
2	Win	2–0	Belfield Walcott	PTS	10	Apr 8, 1901	Business Men's A.C., Boston, Massachusetts, U.S.	
1	Win	1–0	Jack Dwyer	PTS	10	Mar 25, 1901	Business Men's A.C., Boston, Massachusetts, U.S.	

== See also ==
- Lineal championship
- List of welterweight boxing champions

Achievements
Preceded by William "Honey" Mellody	World Welterweight Champion; April 23, 1907 – October 1908; Vacated	Vacant Title last held by Waldemar Holberg
