= Charles Sieger =

American boxer

Charles "Iron Man" Sieger

Charles Sieger was an American boxer who fought in the early 1900s. Fighting out of Hoboken, New Jersey, he was not particularly known for his fighting skills, but had tremendous strength and was able to withstand brutal punishment in the ring, which earned him the nickname "The Iron Man." On November 14, 1902 he fought Joe Gans for the World Lightweight Championship in Baltimore, but lost by TKO in the 14th round. One month later on December 31 he fought Gans again in Boston, this time with the match ending in a pre-arranged draw. In 1915, Sieger ran for mayor of Hoboken, but lost the election.
