= Jimmy Britt =

American boxer

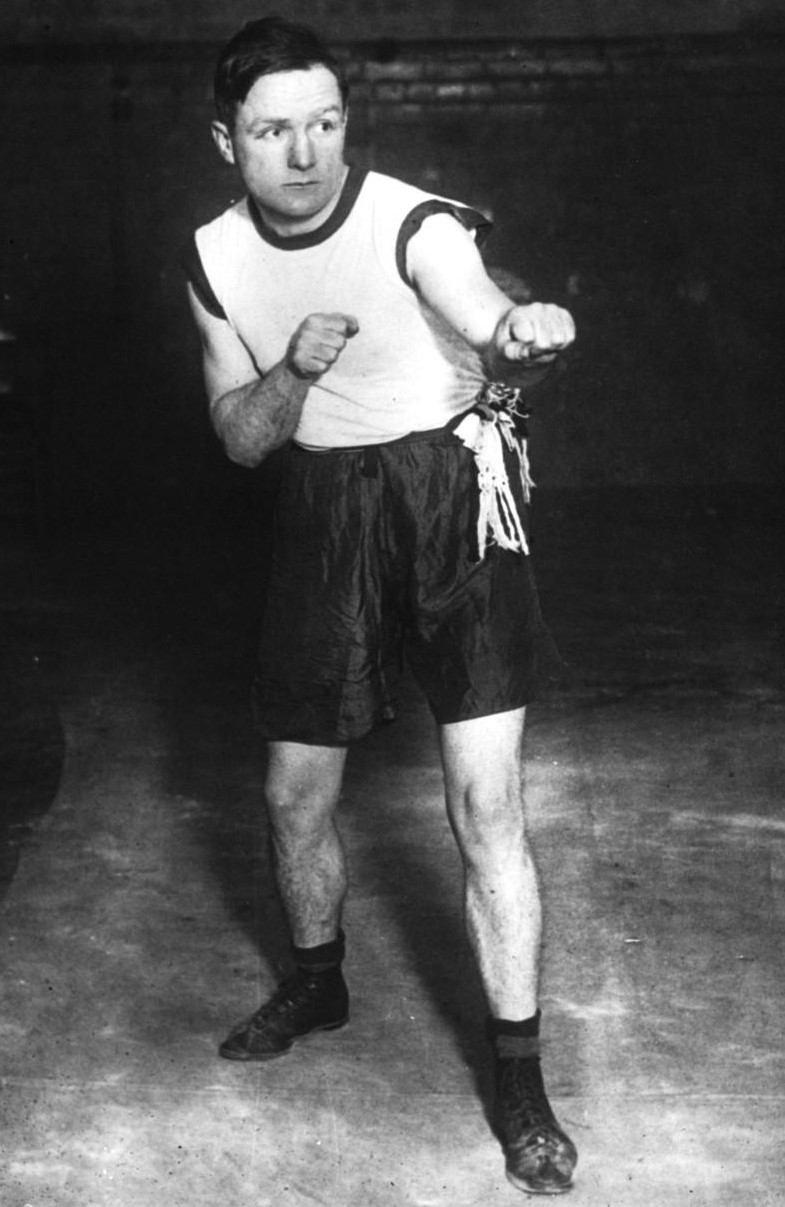

Personal information
- Nationality: American
- Born: James Edward Britt; October 5, 1879 San Francisco, California, U.S.
- Died: January 21, 1940 (aged 60)
- Weight: Lightweight

Boxing career

Boxing record
- Total fights: 23
- Wins: 13
- Win by KO: 4
- Losses: 7
- Draws: 3

Jimmy Britt (October 5, 1879, in San Francisco, California – January 21, 1940) was a boxer from 1902 to 1909. He fought Joe Gans twice for the World lightweight title but lost both bouts. In a career spanning 23 bouts, Britt met 6 different Hall of Famers for a combined total of 10 fights; going 4-4-2. After retiring from boxing in 1909, Britt toured the United States as a vaudeville performer, then later worked as a WPA superintendent. He died of a heart attack in his San Francisco home on January 21, 1940, and was interred at Holy Cross Cemetery (Colma, California). Britt was elected to the Ring Magazine hall of fame in 1976.

== Career ==
=== Amateur ===
In 1901 Jimmy Britt, who was the 135Ib Champion of the Pacific Coast, boxed three rounds with World Featherweight champion Terry McGovern. In this encounter Britt was described as boxing "exceedingly well" by The San Francisco Call.

=== Early professional fights ===
In 18 February 1902 Jimmy Britt had his professional debut in a 15-round scheduled fight against Toby Irwin Britt outclassed his opponent over the 15 rounds to win on points. On 19 May 1902, Britt fought former Lightweight Champion Kid Lavigne. Britt outboxed Lavigne throughout the contest until Kid Lavigne's brother stopped the contest to prevent him from taking any more punishment. Lavigne was discovered to have broken bones in his left forearm after the fight, near where they had broken previously.

Britt then fought former Featherweight and Lightweight Champion Frank Erne on November 26, 1902. Britt knocked out his Swiss opponent in the seventh round; he hurt his opponent with a left to the body early in the round, and after sending him down multiple times, stopped him with a left to the stomach. The San Francisco Call described Britt as finishing the fight "unscathed", with Erne "unable to get in an effective blow", while Frank Erne showed all the signs of his punishment, with his nose, lips, and under his left eye swollen.

Britt then fought Young Corbett II, winning a hard-fought decision over 20 rounds. Britt's face was covered in blood in the fifth round and was staggered in the 10th round, while Corbett was helping in the eighth round, and staggered Corbett in the 15th round. However, Britt took over after the 16th round. The audience was described as not knowing which way the decision would go, until referee Eddie Graney gave it to Jimmy Britt.

=== First fight with Joe Gans ===
On 31 October 1904, Britt challenged World Lightweight Champion Joe Gans. The San Francisco Call said that "Gans was outboxed, outfought, and outgamed" by Britt. Britt fought on the offensive in the first round, but the punching was light in this round. The second round saw both fighting aggressively and throwing hard shots. The third round saw Britt take the lead with a straight right with the body early seriously hurting Gans. In the fourth round, Britt knocked Gans down, and Gans went down twice more, with Britt hitting Gans while still on the ground. In the fifth round, Britt sent Gans back, before the latter once again went down. Britt struck Gans as he came up and was disqualified. The furious Britt then attacked the referee Eddie Graney

=== Series with Battling Nelson ===
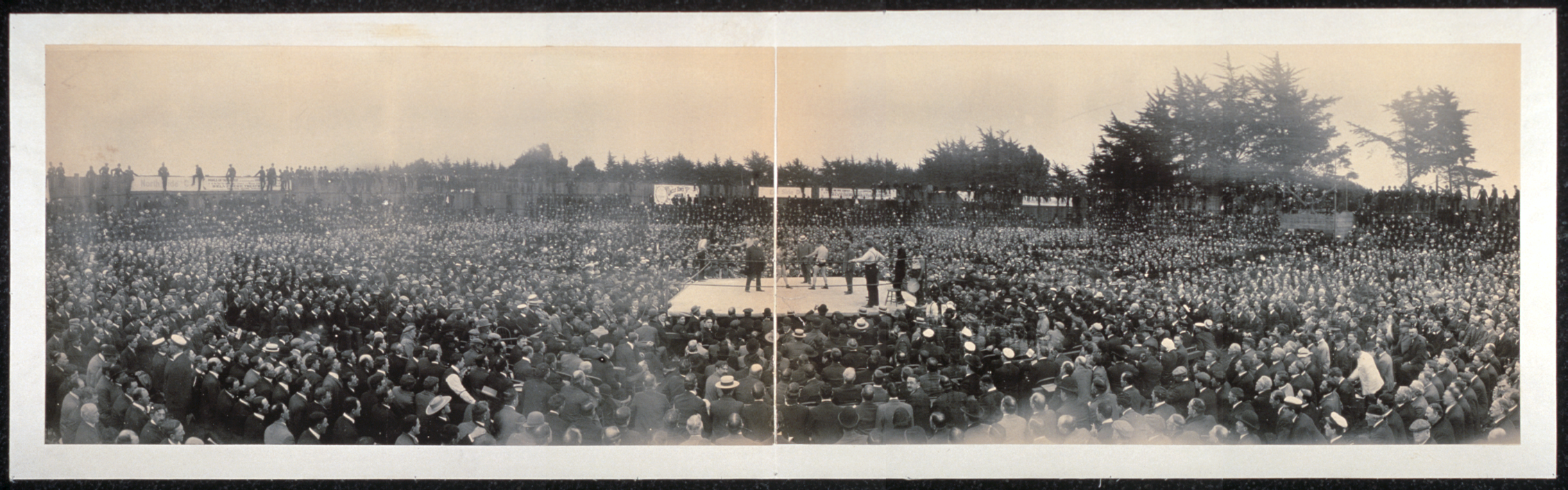
Miles Brothers panoramic photograph of the Nelson–Britt prize fight in San Francisco on September 9, 1905

On 20 December 1904, Britt fought his first of four fights with Battling Nelson. Britt won a decision after 20 rounds, outboxing Nelson despite being badly hurt multiple times by the Durable Dane, by keeping the fight at range and using his superior boxing science.

Nelson and Britt would once again fight on 9 September 1905. R. A. Smyth said Britt did not fight with his usual cleverness, and in the 18th round Nelson caught Britt with a light left, and then a right that sent Britt down until he was counted out.

Their third fight was held on 31 July 1907, with Britt winning another decision over the 20 rounds. The referee, Jack Welsh, said that Nelson only won two of the 20 rounds, and that "the rest of the time Britt outclassed him at every point".

=== Rematch with Gans and later career ===
Joe Gans announced his challenge to the winner of the third fight between Battling Nelson and Jimmy Britt in a speech before that fight. On 9 September 1907, Joe Gans and Jimmy Britt would once again fight for the World Lightweight Championship, however Britt was unable to repeat his success of the first fight. R. A. Smyth said, "Britt was hopelessly outclassed from the second round until the end came at the close of the fifth round." Britt quit after the end of the fifth round with an injury. Britt was examined by multiple physicians, three of which diagnosed a fractured ulna, while Gans' physician said it was bruised.

Jimmy Britt would then fight a 10-round no-decision contest with Battling Nelson on 3 March 1908, with newspapers differing as to who was better.

Britt would then be stopped in the sixth round by Packey McFarland on 11 April 1908. After this he would have three fights with Johnny Summers in the United Kingdom, winning the first on decision in 1908, before losing a decision, and being knocked out in 1909.

== Professional boxing record ==
23 fights	13 wins	7 losses
By knockout	4	4
By decision	9	3
Draws	1	
Newspaper decisions/draws	2	

All Newspaper decisions are regarded as “no decision” bouts as they have “resulted in neither boxer winning or losing, and would therefore not count as part of their official fight record."

No.	Result	Record	Opponent	Type	Round, time	Date	Location	Notes
23	Loss	13–7–1 (2)	(United Kingdom) Johnny Summers	KO	9 (20)	1909-07-31	(United Kingdom) Memorial Ground, West Ham, London	
22	Loss	13–6–1 (2)	(United Kingdom) Johnny Summers	PTS	20	1909-02-22	(United Kingdom) National Sporting Club, Covent Garden, London	
21	Win	13–5–1 (2)	(United Kingdom) Johnny Summers	PTS	10	1908-11-02	(United Kingdom) Wonderland, Mile End, London	
20	Loss	12–5–1 (2)	(United States) Packey McFarland	TKO	6 (20)	1908-04-11	(United States) Mission Street Arena, Colma, California	
19	Draw	12–4–1 (2)	(Denmark) Battling Nelson	NWS	10	1908-03-03	(United States) Naud Junction Pavilion, Los Angeles, California	Newspaper Decision
18	Loss	12–4–1 (1)	(United States) Joe Gans	TKO	6 (20)	1907-09-09	(United States) Recreation Park, San Francisco, California	For world lightweight title
17	Win	12–3–1 (1)	(Denmark) Battling Nelson	PTS	20	1907-07-31	(United States) Auditorium Rink, Los Angeles, California	Won world 'white' lightweight title
16	Draw	11–3–1 (1)	(United States) Terry McGovern	NWS	10	1906-05-28	(United States) Madison Square Garden, New York, New York	Newspaper Decision
15	Loss	11–3–1	(Denmark) Battling Nelson	KO	18 (20)	1905-09-09	(United States) Mission Street Arena, Colma, California	Lost world 'white' lightweight title
14	Win	11–2–1	(United States) Kid Sullivan	PTS	20	1905-07-21	(United States) Woodward's Pavilion, San Francisco, California	Retained world 'white' lightweight title
13	Win	10–2–1	(United States) Jabez White	TKO	20 (20)	1905-05-05	(United States) Woodward's Pavilion, San Francisco, California	Retained world 'white' lightweight title
12	Win	9–2–1	(Denmark) Battling Nelson	PTS	20	1904-12-20	(United States) Mechanic's Pavilion, San Francisco, California	Won vacant world 'white' lightweight title
11	Loss	8–2–1	(United States) Joe Gans	DQ	5 (20)	1904-10-31	(United States) Recreation Park, San Francisco, California	For world lightweight title
10	Win	8–1–1	(United States) Young Corbett II	PTS	20	1904-03-25	(United States) Woodward's Pavilion, San Francisco, California	Won world featherweight title; At 130lbs
9	Win	7–1–1	(Republic of Ireland) Martin Canole	PTS	25	1903-11-20	(United States) Colma A.C, Colma, California	Retained world 'white' lightweight title
8	Win	6–1–1	(United States) Charley Sieger	PTS	20	1903-11-10	(United States) Mechanic's Pavilion, San Francisco, California	Retained world 'white' lightweight title
7	Draw	5–1–1	(United States) Jack O'Keefe	PTS	20	1903-06-13	(United States) Old Baseball Park, Butte, Montana	Retained world 'white' lightweight title
6	Win	5–1	(United States) Willie Fitzgerald	PTS	20	1903-04-28	(United States) Mechanic's Pavilion, San Francisco, California	Retained world 'white' lightweight title
5	Loss	4–1	(United States) Jack O'Keefe	DQ	6 (20)	1903-03-09	(United States) Pastime A.C., Portland, Oregon	Retained world 'white' lightweight title O'Keefe received no recognition as he had been KO'd by the last punch
4	Win	4–0	(United States) Frank Erne	KO	7 (20)	1902-11-26	(United States) Mechanic's Pavilion, San Francisco, California	Won vacant 'white' lightweight title
3	Win	3–0	(United States) Kid Lavigne	TKO	8 (20)	1902-05-29	(United States) Woodward's Pavilion, San Francisco, California	
2	Win	2–0	(Australia) Tim Hegarty	KO	8	1902-02-28	(United States) Mechanic's Pavilion, San Francisco, California	
1	Win	1–0	(United States) Toby Irwin	PTS	15	1902-02-18	(United States) Acme A.C., Oakland, California	

Titles in pretence
Preceded by Frank Erne	World White Lightweight Champion; June 24, 1902 – September 9, 1905	Succeeded by Battling Nelson
Preceded by Battling Nelson	World White Lightweight Champion; July 31, 1907 – September 9, 1909; Lost bid for Undisputed Title	Title Defunct
