= Joe Gans =

American boxer

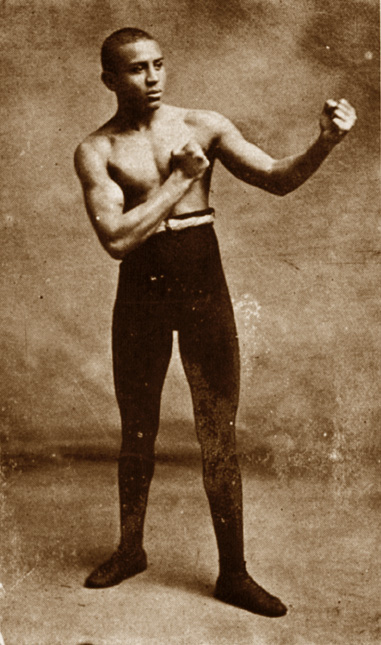
- Gans in 1899

Personal information
- Nickname: Old Master
- Born: Joseph Gant (Joseph Saifus Butts); November 25, 1874 Baltimore, Maryland, U.S.
- Died: August 10, 1910 (aged 35) Baltimore, Maryland, U.S.
- Height: 5 ft 6 1/2 in (1.69 m)
- Weight: Lightweight

Boxing career
- Reach: 71 in (180 cm)
- Stance: Orthodox

Boxing record
- Total fights: 197
- Wins: 157
- Win by KO: 100
- Losses: 12
- Draws: 22
- No contests: 6

Joe Gans (born Joseph Saifus Butts; November 25, 1874 – August 10, 1910) was an American professional boxer. Gans was rated the greatest lightweight boxer of all time by boxing historian and Ring Magazine founder Nat Fleischer. Known as the "Old Master," Gans became the first African-American world boxing champion of the 20th century, reigning continuously as world lightweight champion from 1902 to 1908, defending the title 15 times against 13 other boxers. He was inducted into the International Boxing Hall of Fame in 1990.

== Life and career ==
=== Early life ===
Gans was born as Joseph Gant on November 25, 1874 in Baltimore, MD. He started boxing professionally in 1891 in Baltimore.

=== Two fights in one day ===
On January 7, 1895, after knocking out Samuel Allen in three rounds, Allen's second, Bud Brown, immediately challenged Gans. Not backing down from a fight, Gans accepted and outpointed Brown in a 10-round points decision.

=== Title bouts ===
On March 3, 1900, at the Broadway Athletic Club in New York City, Gans quit with an eye injury in the twelfth round and lost via TKO while challenging lightweight champion Frank Erne in Gans' first title fight.

However, in their rematch two years later at the International A.C. in Fort Erie, Ontario, Gans knocked Erne out in one round to convincingly take the world lightweight title. "In the exchange, Gans got both hands to head, and Erne seemed a trifle dazed. Gans felt him out with a left shove to the face, drawing blood to nose. Erne seemed dazed, and Gans rushed and exchanged, putting right plump on Erne's jaw. Erne fell slowly to the floor with his mouth and nose bleeding, rolled over on his stomach, and was counted out before he could attempt to regain his feet." Gans had thus become the first-ever U.S.-born African-American boxing champion. (Canadian-born black George Dixon had won the world bantamweight title in 1892, and Barbados Joe Walcott had won the world welterweight title in 1901, but neither of them was U.S.-born.) Gans reigned as champion from 1902 to 1908.

On January 6, 1902, Gans defeated the former world welterweight champion, Canadian-born Eddie Connolly, in a five-round bout at the Washington Sports Club in Philadelphia.

One reporter noted that Connolly "did nothing but hug and wrestle, adding variety to his performance in the third by deliberately trying to butt the Baltimorean [Gans]." The reporter also noted that Connolly clinched frequently and "wrestled" rather than boxed, probably to protect himself from Gans' fierce assaults. By the time the referee ended the bout in the fifth round, Connolly had been "rendered practically helpless" by the powerful punching of Gans.

Gans also defended his Lightweight World Title against other talented boxers such as Steve Crosby and Gus Gardiner. There was also Charley Sieger, Kid McPartland, Rufe Turner, Charles "Elbows" McFadden, and Frank Erne.

In an important title defense, he defeated the "Durable Dane" Oscar "Battling" Nelson in 42 rounds on September 3, 1906, in Goldfield, Nevada. This blockbuster fight, arranged by legendary promoter Tex Rickard, would eventually be honored with a historic memorial.

On September 15, 1905, Gans fought to a 15-round prearranged draw with future Welterweight World Championship claimant Mike "Twin" Sullivan. Most people reporting on the fights believed that Sullivan deserved the decision. In an immediate rematch, he defeated Sullivan by knockout on January 19 and March 17, 1906, in San Francisco and Los Angeles and again in March of the same year.

Although the bout was recorded as a Welterweight Title match and thus supposedly had a weight limit of around 142 pounds (which was estimated to be Sullivan's weigh-in), Gans' weigh-in was estimated to have been 134 pounds. Gans' defeat of the heavier Sullivan, a strong puncher by reputation, showed his mastery in the ring. In this well-attended bout, Gans share of the gate was a considerable $2,425.20, and Sullivan's was $1,616.80. Gans reportedly had bet another $1,700 on himself.

Gans and Battling Nelson fought for the World Lightweight title twice in Colma, California: first on July 4 and again on September 9 of 1908. Gans lost the first fight by knockout in the 17th round of 45, ending his multi-year reign as champion; he lost the rematch via KO in the 21st round of 45. But there were reports that the conditions were laid down by Nelson's handlers. Gans had to weigh in at ringside at not more than 132 lbs fully dressed. Black fighters in those days deferred to the white men in a way we can't realise today. A very important point also is that Gans was actually dying by then of consumption, and in fact died less than 2 years later of the incurable disease.

=== Draw with Barbados Joe Walcott ===
On September 30, 1904, Gans fought to a 20-round draw against Barbados Joe Walcott. "The San Francisco Chronicle reported that Walcott damaged ligaments in his left arm and that it was 'useless from the 4th round on.' It was announced before the fight that no title was at stake. Referee Jack Welch gave 7 rounds to Gans, 5 to Walcott, with 8 even, but thought that Walcott's aggressiveness compensated Gans' advantage in cleverness. Shortly after this fight, Walcott accidentally shot himself in the hand and was out of action until January 1906."

=== Death ===
Joe Gans died on August 10, 1910, of tuberculosis, at the age of 35. He is buried in Mount Auburn Cemetery in Baltimore. His monument is maintained by the International Boxing Commission and sits just to the left of the main entrance of the cemetery.

His monument reads: "I was born in the city of Baltimore in the year 1874, and it might be well to state at this time that my right name is Joseph Gant, not Gans. However, when I became an object of newspaper publicity, some reporter made a mistake and my name appeared as Joe Gans, and as Joe Gans it remained ever since."

== Professional honors and legacy ==
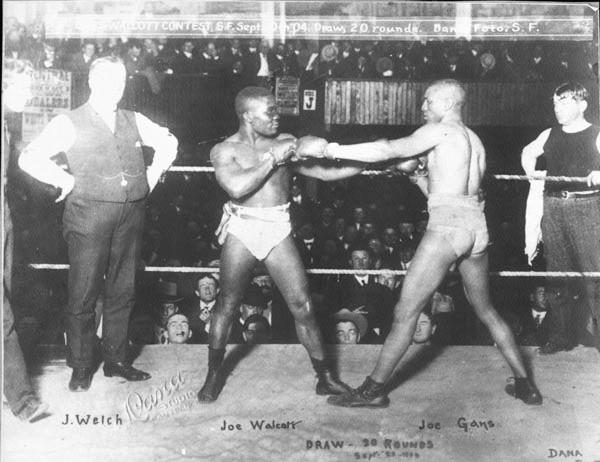
Joe Walcott vs. Joe Gans

Gans had a final professional record of 145 wins with 100 knockouts, 10 losses, 16 draws, 6 no contests and 19 no decisions (Newspaper Decisions: 13–2–4). He was inducted into the International Boxing Hall of Fame in 1990.

A bronze statue of Joe Gans stands on the suite floor at Madison Square Garden, having previously been outside of the locker rooms. Boxers would traditionally bump the statue's outstretched left fist for good luck before matches.

Gans' legendary fight with Battling Nelson on September 3, 1906, was commemorated with a memorial located in Goldfield, Nevada, at the site of the fight.

Gans was the first African-American to win a World Boxing Championship and the first to win a Lightweight Boxing title. Gans' achievements not only set new records, but gave African Americans hope in the early twentieth century. In a time of racial segregation, champion Joe Gans somehow emerged victorious.

Gans was rated the greatest lightweight boxer of all-time by boxing historian and Ring Magazine founder Nat Fleischer, who died in 1972.

One boxing historian writes of Gans: "Through his ring accomplishments, Gans put into action what others could only theorize. The articulation of the black quest for social equality reached large audiences through the pulpits, and the most authoritative sermons were published in newspapers and religious quarterlies."

On November 25, 2024, Maryland Governor Wes Moore and Baltimore mayor Brandon Scott issued proclamations recognizing the day as Joe Gans Day.

== Motion picture ==
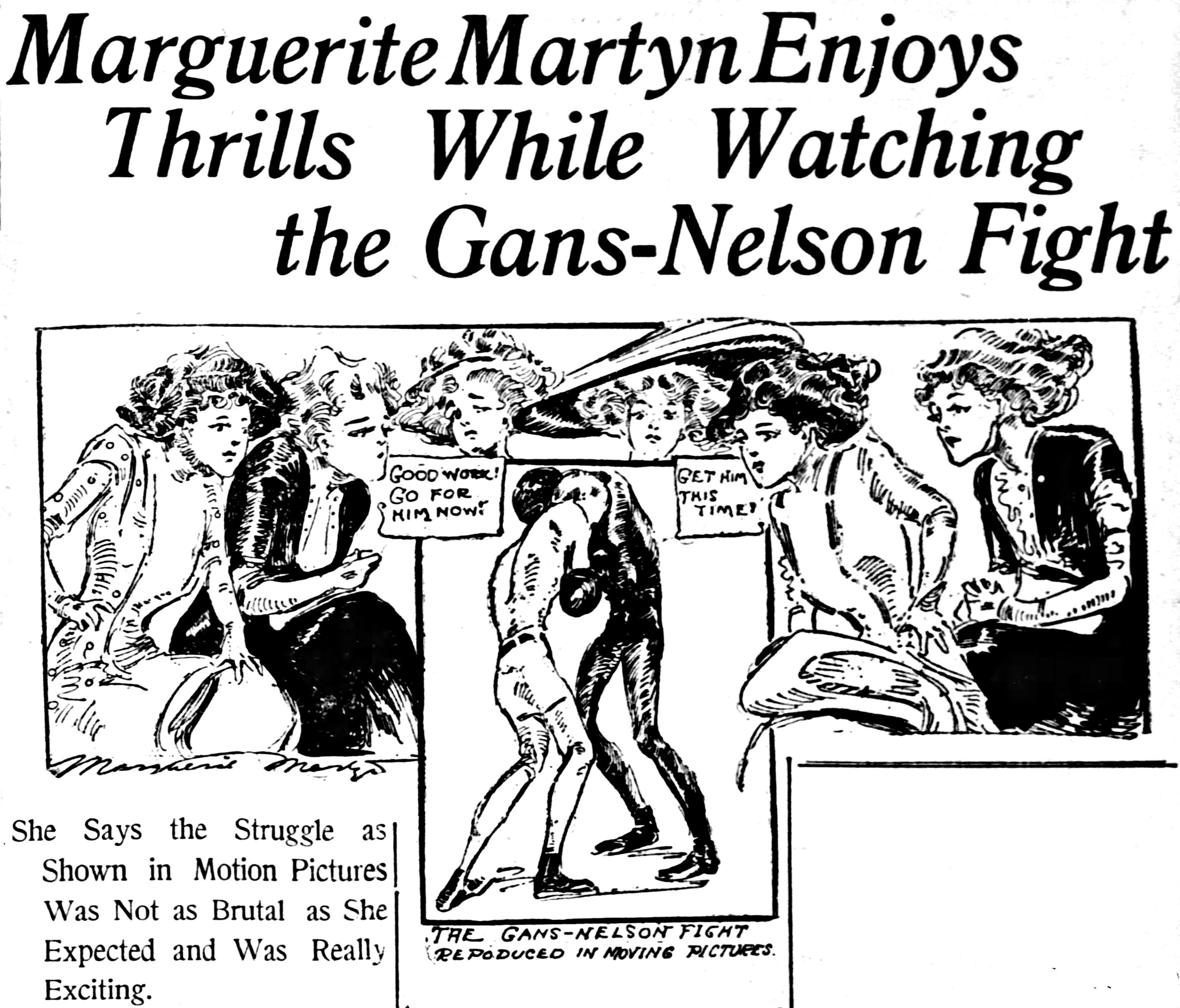
A four-reel motion picture of the second Gans-Nelson fight in Colma, California, was shown in theaters across the country. Above, reporter-artist Marguerite Martyn sketched her impression of women watching the film in St. Louis, Missouri, in October 1908.

The Gans-Nelson battle in Colma, California, was the subject of a four-reel motion picture that played in major cities around the country.

== Hemingway connection ==
Ernest Hemingway used Joe Gans as a character in his 1916 short story "A Matter of Colour." This early story set the stage for Hemingway's 1927 parable "The Killers."

== Professional boxing record ==
All information in this section is derived from BoxRec unless otherwise stated.

=== Official record ===
199 fights	147 wins	10 losses
By knockout	101	5
By decision	39	5
By disqualification	7	0
Draws	16	
No contests	6	
Newspaper decisions/draws	20	

All newspaper decisions are officially regarded as "no decision" bouts and are not counted in the win/loss/draw column.

No.	Result	Record	Opponent	Type	Round, time	Date	Location	Notes
199	Win	147–10–16 (26)	Jabez White	NWS	10	Mar 12, 1909	National S.C., New York City, US	
198	Loss	147–10–16 (25)	Battling Nelson	KO	21 (45)	Sep 9, 1908	Mission Street Arena, Colma, California, US	For world lightweight title
197	Loss	147–9–16 (25)	Battling Nelson	KO	17 (45)	Jul 4, 1908	Mission Street Arena, Colma, California, US	Lost world lightweight title
196	Win	147–8–16 (25)	Rudy Unholz	TKO	11 (20)	May 14, 1908	Coliseum, San Francisco, California, US	Retained world lightweight title
195	Win	146–8–16 (25)	Frank 'Spike' Robson	TKO	3 (6), 2:25	Apr 1, 1908	National A.C., Philadelphia, Pennsylvania, US	
194	Win	145–8–16 (25)	Bob Blackburn	KO	3 (5)	Jan 3, 1908	Germania Maennerchor Hall, Baltimore, Maryland, US	
193	Win	144–8–16 (25)	George Memsic	PTS	20	Sep 27, 1907	Naud Junction Pavilion, Los Angeles, California	Retained world lightweight title
192	Win	143–8–16 (25)	Jimmy Britt	TKO	6 (20)	Sep 9, 1907	Recreation Park, San Francisco, California, US	Retained world lightweight title
191	Win	142–8–16 (25)	Kid Herman	KO	8 (?)	Jan 1, 1907	Casino A.C. Arena, Tonopah, California, US	Retained world lightweight title
190	Win	141–8–16 (25)	Battling Nelson	DQ	42 ($\infty$)	Sep 3, 1906	Casino Amphitheatre, Goldfield, Nevada, US	Retained world lightweight title; A fight to the finish
189	Win	140–8–16 (25)	Dave Holly	PTS	20	Jul 23, 1906	Pleasant Beach, Bainbridge Island, Washington, US	Retained world lightweight title
188	Win	139–8–16 (25)	Jack Blackburn	NWS	6	Jun 29, 1906	National A.C., Philadelphia, Pennsylvania, US	
187	Draw	139–8–16 (24)	Harry Lewis	NWS	6	Jun 15, 1906	National A.C., Philadelphia, Pennsylvania, US	
186	Loss	139–8–16 (23)	Willie Lewis	NWS	6	May 18, 1906	Madison Square Garden, New York City, US	
185	Win	139–8–16 (22)	Mike "Twin" Sullivan	TKO	10 (20)	Mar 17, 1906	Chutes Park, Los Angeles, California	Retained world welterweight title claim at 142 lbs; Police stopped the fight
184	Win	138–8–16 (22)	Mike 'Twin' Sullivan	KO	15 (20), 1:15	Jan 19, 1906	Woodward's Pavilion, San Francisco, California, US	Gans claims world welterweight title at 142lbs
183	Draw	137–8–16 (22)	Mike 'Twin' Sullivan	PTS	15	Sep 15, 1905	Lyric Theater, Baltimore, Maryland, US	Retained world lightweight title; Pre-arranged draw if lasting the distance
182	Win	137–8–15 (22)	Rufe Turner	NWS	6	Mar 27, 1905	Washington S.C., Philadelphia, Pennsylvania, US	
181	Win	137–8–15 (21)	Jimmy Britt	DQ	5 (20), 0:30	Oct 31, 1904	Mechanic's Pavilion, San Francisco, California, US	Retained world lightweight title; Britt DQ'd for hitting Gans while he was rising from a knockdown
180	Draw	136–8–15 (21)	Barbados Joe Walcott	PTS	20	Sep 30, 1904	Woodward's Pavilion, San Francisco, California, US	
179	Draw	136–8–14 (21)	Dave Holly	NWS	6	Jun 27, 1904	National A.C., Philadelphia, Pennsylvania, US	
178	Win	136–8–14 (20)	Sammy Smith	TKO	4 (6)	Jun 13, 1904	National A.C., Philadelphia, Pennsylvania, US	
177	Win	135–8–14 (20)	Kid Griffo	TKO	7 (15)	Jun 3, 1904	Germania Maennerchor Hall, Baltimore, Maryland, US	
176	Win	134–8–14 (20)	Jewey Cook	RTD	7 (10)	May 27, 1904	Germania Maennerchor Hall, Baltimore, Maryland, US	
175	Win	133–8–14 (20)	Sam Bolen	PTS	15	Apr 21, 1904	Germania Maennerchor Hall, Baltimore, Maryland, US	
174	Win	132–8–14 (20)	Gus Gardner	PTS	10	Mar 28, 1904	Arbelten Hall, Saginaw, Michigan, US	
173	Win	131–8–14 (20)	Jack Blackburn	PTS	15	Mar 25, 1904	Germania Maennerchor Hall, Baltimore, Maryland, US	
172	Win	130–8–14 (20)	Mike Ward	TKO	10 (10)	Feb 2, 1904	Light Guard Armory, Detroit, Michigan, US	
171	Win	129–8–14 (20)	Joe Grim	PTS	10	Jan 22, 1904	Shlegel's Hall, Baltimore, Maryland, US	
170	Win	128–8–14 (20)	Clarence Connors	TKO	2 (6)	Jan 19, 1904	Mount Clemens, Michigan, US	
169	Win	127–8–14 (20)	Willie Fitzgerald	PTS	10	Jan 12, 1904	Light Guard Armory, Detroit, Michigan, US	Retained world lightweight title
168	Loss	126–8–14 (20)	Sam Langford	PTS	15	Dec 8, 1903	Criterion A.C., Boston, Massachusetts, US	
167	Win	126–7–14 (20)	Dave Holly	NWS	6	Dec 7, 1903	Washington S.C., Philadelphia, Pennsylvania, US	
166	Loss	126–7–14 (19)	Jack Blackburn	NWS	6	Nov 2, 1903	Washington S.C., Philadelphia, Pennsylvania, US	
165	Draw	126–7–14 (18)	Dave Holly	NWS	6	Oct 23, 1903	State A.C., Philadelphia, Pennsylvania, US	
164	Win	126–7–14 (17)	Eddie Kennedy	NWS	6	Oct 20, 1903	Southern A.C., Philadelphia, Pennsylvania, US	
163	Win	126–7–14 (16)	Joe Grim	NWS	6	Oct 19, 1903	Washington S.C., Philadelphia, Pennsylvania, US	
162	Win	126–7–14 (15)	Buddy King	KO	5 (20)	Jul 4, 1903	Old Baseball Park, Butte, Montana, US	
161	Win	125–7–14 (15)	Willie Fitzgerald	KO	10 (20)	May 29, 1903	Mechanic's Pavilion, San Francisco, California, US	
160	Win	124–7–14 (15)	Tom Tracey	TKO	9 (20)	May 13, 1903	Pastime A.C., Portland, Oregon, US	
159	Win	123–7–14 (15)	Jack Bennett	KO	5 (10)	Mar 23, 1903	Masonic Hall, Allegheny, Pennsylvania, US	
158	Win	122–7–14 (15)	Steve Crosby	TKO	11 (20)	Mar 11, 1903	Whittington Park, Hot Springs, Arkansas, US	Retained world lightweight title
157	Win	121–7–14 (15)	Gus Gardner	DQ	11 (20), 1:05	Jan 1, 1903	Casino, New Britain, Connecticut, US	Retained world lightweight title
156	Draw	120–7–14 (15)	Charley Siegar	PTS	10	Dec 31, 1902	Criterion A.C., Boston, Massachusetts, US	Pre-arranged draw if lasting the distance.
155	Win	120–7–13 (15)	Howard Wilson	TKO	3 (20)	Dec 19, 1902	Scituate Athletic Club, Scituate, Rhode Island, US	
154	Win	119–7–13 (15)	Charley Siegar	TKO	14 (20)	Nov 14, 1902	Germania Maennerchor Hall, Baltimore, Maryland, US	Retained world lightweight title
153	Win	118–7–13 (15)	Dave Holly	NWS	10	Oct 14, 1902	Maennerchor Hall, Lancaster, Pennsylvania, US	
152	Win	118–7–13 (14)	Kid McPartland	KO	5 (20), 2:25	Oct 13, 1902	International A.C., Fort Erie, Ontario, Canada	Retained world lightweight title
151	Win	117–7–13 (14)	Jack Bennett	KO	2 (6)	Sep 22, 1902	Golden Gate A.C., Philadelphia, Pennsylvania, US	
150	Win	116–7–13 (14)	Gus Gardner	KO	5 (20)	Sep 17, 1902	Music Hall, Baltimore, Maryland, US	
149	Win	115–7–13 (14)	Rufe Turner	KO	15 (15)	Jul 24, 1902	Acme A.C., Oakland, California, US	Retained world lightweight title
148	Win	114–7–13 (14)	George 'Elbows' McFadden	TKO	3 (20)	Jun 27, 1902	Woodward's Pavilion, San Francisco, California, US	Retained world lightweight title
147	Win	113–7–13 (14)	St. Mary's County Bully	DQ	3 (4)	May 29, 1902	Monumental Theater, Baltimore, Maryland, US	
146	Win	112–7–13 (14)	Charles Boyer	TKO	2 (4)	May 28, 1902	Monumental Theater, Baltimore, Maryland, US	
145	Win	111–7–13 (14)	Edward Snowden	KO	2 (4)	May 28, 1902	Monumental Theater, Baltimore, Maryland, US	
144	Win	110–7–13 (14)	Joe Burke	RTD	2 (4)	May 27, 1902	Monumental Theater, Baltimore, Maryland, US	
143	Win	109–7–13 (14)	Frank Erne	KO	1 (20), 1:40	May 12, 1902	International A.C., Fort Erie, Ontario, Canada	Won world lightweight title
142	Win	108–7–13 (14)	Jack Bennett	KO	5 (20)	Mar 27, 1902	Ford Opera House, Baltimore, Maryland, US	
141	Win	107–7–13 (14)	Jack Ryan	TKO	4 (15)	Mar 7, 1902	Keystone A.C., Allentown, Pennsylvania, US	
140	Win	106–7–13 (14)	George 'Elbows' McFadden	NWS	6	Feb 17, 1902	Penn Art Club, Philadelphia, Pennsylvania, US	
139	Win	106–7–13 (13)	Eddie Connolly	DQ	5 (6)	Jan 6, 1902	Washington S.C., Philadelphia, Pennsylvania, US	Connolly DQ'd for head-butting Gans multiple times under the chin
138	Win	105–7–13 (13)	Tom Broderick	KO	6 (20)	Jan 3, 1902	Germania Maennerchor Hall, Baltimore, Maryland, US	
137	Win	104–7–13 (13)	Joe Youngs	TKO	4 (6)	Dec 30, 1901	Washington S.C., Philadelphia, Pennsylvania, US	Youngs quit in the middle of the round, with both of his eyes almost closed
136	Win	103–7–13 (13)	Bobby Dobbs	TKO	14 (20)	Dec 13, 1901	Germania Maennerchor Hall, Baltimore, Maryland, US	
135	Win	102–7–13 (13)	Billy Moore	KO	3 (20)	Nov 22, 1901	Eureka Athletic Club, Baltimore, Maryland, US	
134	Win	101–7–13 (13)	Jack Hanlon	KO	2 (20)	Nov 15, 1901	Germania Maennerchor Hall, Baltimore, Maryland, US	
133	Win	100–7–13 (13)	Dan McConnell	KO	3 (8)	Oct 4, 1901	Germania Maennerchor Hall, Baltimore, Maryland, US	
132	Win	99–7–13 (13)	Joe Handler	TKO	1 (20)	Sep 30, 1901	Trenton A.C., Trenton, New Jersey, US	
131	Win	98–7–13 (13)	Steve Crosby	TKO	12 (20)	Sep 20, 1901	Germania Maennerchor Hall, Baltimore, Maryland, US	Police stopped the fight
130	Draw	97–7–13 (13)	Steve Crosby	PTS	20	Aug 23, 1901	Music Hall, Louisville, Kentucky, US	Retained world colored lightweight title
129	Win	97–7–12 (13)	Kid Thomas	NWS	6	Jul 15, 1901	Ford Opera House, Baltimore, Maryland, US	Third fight in one day
128	Win	97–7–12 (12)	Jack Donahue	TKO	2 (6)	Jul 15, 1901	Ford Opera House, Baltimore, Maryland, US	Second fight in one day
127	Win	96–7–12 (12)	Harry Berger	NWS	6	Jul 15, 1901	Ford Opera House, Baltimore, Maryland, US	
126	Win	96–7–12 (11)	Bobby Dobbs	KO	7 (20)	May 31, 1901	Eureka Athletic Club, Baltimore, Maryland, US	
125	Win	95–7–12 (11)	Martin Flaherty	TKO	4 (20)	Apr 1, 1901	Ford's Theater, Baltimore, Maryland, US	
124	Win	94–7–12 (11)	Wilmington Jack Daly	DQ	5 (20), 2:05	Feb 13, 1901	Music Hall, Baltimore, Maryland, US	
123	Loss	93–7–12 (11)	Terry McGovern	KO	2 (6), 2:05	Dec 13, 1900	Tattersall's, Chicago, Illinois, US	
122	Win	93–6–12 (11)	Kid Parker	KO	4 (10)	Nov 16, 1900	Colorado A.C., Denver, Colorado, US	
121	Win	92–6–12 (11)	Jimmy 'Spider' Kelly	TKO	8 (10)	Oct 19, 1900	Colorado A.C., Denver, Colorado, US	
120	Win	91–6–12 (11)	Otto Sieloff	KO	9 (10)	Oct 16, 1900	Olympic A.C., Denver, Colorado, US	
119	Win	90–6–12 (11)	Alec Johnson	KO	1 (5), 2:23	Oct 11, 1900	Leadville Athletic Club, Leadville, Colorado, US	
118	Win	89–6–12 (11)	Bird Leg Collins	TKO	4 (5)	Oct 11, 1900	Leadville Athletic Club, Leadville, Colorado, US	
117	Win	88–6–12 (11)	Joe Youngs	PTS	10	Oct 5, 1900	Colorado A.A., Denver, Colorado, US	
116	Draw	87–6–12 (11)	George 'Elbows' McFadden	PTS	10	Oct 2, 1900	Olympic A.C., Denver, Colorado, US	
115	Win	87–6–11 (11)	George 'Elbows' McFadden	NWS	6	Sep 7, 1900	Penn Art Club, Philadelphia, Pennsylvania, US	
114	Win	87–6–11 (10)	Dal Hawkins	KO	3 (25)	Aug 31, 1900	Broadway A.C., New York City, US	Time was either 2:21 or 2:57
113	Win	86–6–11 (10)	Whitey Lester	KO	4 (20)	Jul 12, 1900	Ford Opera House, Baltimore, Maryland, US	
112	Win	85–6–11 (10)	Young Griffo	TKO	8 (25), 1:38	Jul 10, 1900	Seaside A.C., Coney Island, New York, US	
111	Win	84–6–11 (10)	Barney Furey	KO	9 (15)	Jun 26, 1900	People's Theater, Cincinnati, Ohio, US	
110	Win	83–6–11 (10)	Dal Hawkins	KO	2 (25), 1:15	May 25, 1900	Broadway A.C., New York City, US	
109	Win	82–6–11 (10)	Chicago Jack Daly	TKO	5 (6)	Apr 1, 1900	Penn Art Club, Philadelphia, Pennsylvania, US	
108	Loss	81–6–11 (10)	Frank Erne	TKO	12 (25)	Mar 23, 1900	Broadway A.C., New York City, US	For world lightweight title; Gans asked to have the bout stopped after being cut by an accidental head-butt.
107	Win	81–5–11 (10)	Spike Sullivan	TKO	14 (25), 2:17	Feb 9, 1900	Broadway A.C., New York City, US	
106	Draw	80–5–11 (10)	Kid McPartland	PTS	6	Dec 22, 1899	Star Theatre, Chicago, Illinois, US	
105	Win	80–5–10 (10)	Kid Ash	PTS	15	Dec 11, 1899	Robinson Opera House, Cincinnati, Ohio, US	
104	Win	79–5–10 (10)	Steve Crosby	PTS	6	Nov 24, 1899	Star Theatre, Chicago, Illinois, US	
103	Win	78–5–10 (10)	George 'Elbows' McFadden	PTS	25	Oct 31, 1899	Broadway A.C., New York City, US	
102	Win	77–5–10 (10)	Martin Judge	PTS	20	Oct 11, 1899	Germania Maennerchor Hall, Baltimore, Maryland, US	
101	Draw	76–5–10 (10)	Wilmington Jack Daly	NWS	6	Oct 7, 1899	Nonpareil A.C., Philadelphia, Pennsylvania, US	
100	Win	76–5–10 (9)	Jimmy 'Spider' Kelly	PTS	25	Oct 3, 1899	Lenox A.C., New York City, US	
99	Win	75–5–10 (9)	Martin Judge	PTS	12 (20)	Sep 15, 1899	Music Hall, Baltimore, Maryland, US	Police stopped the fight at the end of the 12th round on account of foul work in the clinches.
98	Win	74–5–10 (9)	Eugene Bezenah	KO	10 (25), 2:23	Sep 1, 1899	Broadway A.C., New York City, US	
97	Draw	73–5–10 (9)	George 'Elbows' McFadden	PTS	25	Jul 28, 1899	Broadway A.C., New York City, US	
96	Win	73–5–9 (9)	Jack Dobbs	TKO	4 (25)	Jul 24, 1899	Seabright Casino, Ocean City, Maryland, US	
95	Loss	72–5–9 (9)	George 'Elbows' McFadden	KO	23 (25)	Apr 14, 1899	Broadway A.C., Brooklyn, New York City, US	
94	Win	72–4–9 (9)	Billy Ernst	DQ	10 (20)	Feb 6, 1899	Olympic A.C., Buffalo, New York, US	Ernst DQ'd for headbutting Gans
93	Win	71–4–9 (9)	Martin Judge	PTS	20	Jan 28, 1899	Crescent A.C., Toronto, Ontario, Canada	
92	Win	70–4–9 (9)	Young Smyrna	KO	2 (25), 2:50	Jan 13, 1899	Germania Maennerchor Hall, Baltimore, Maryland, US	
91	Win	69–4–9 (9)	Wilmington Jack Daly	PTS	25	Dec 27, 1898	Lenox A.C., New York City, US	
90	Win	68–4–9 (9)	Kid McPartland	PTS	25	Nov 4, 1898	Lenox A.C., New York City, US	
89	Win	67–4–9 (9)	William Duke	PTS	4	Sep 30, 1898	Monumental Amphitheatre, Baltimore, Maryland, US	
88	Win	66–4–9 (9)	Fred Sweigert	PTS	4	Sep 29, 1898	Monumental Amphitheatre, Baltimore, Maryland, US	
87	Win	65–4–9 (9)	James Martin	TKO	4 (4)	Sep 28, 1898	Monumental Amphitheatre, Baltimore, Maryland, US	
86	Win	64–4–9 (9)	Joseph Smith	TKO	1 (4)	Sep 27, 1898	Monumental Amphitheatre, Baltimore, Maryland, US	Third fight in one day
85	Win	63–4–9 (9)	William Hinton	TKO	1 (4)	Sep 27, 1898	Monumental Amphitheatre, Baltimore, Maryland, US	Second fight in one day
84	Win	62–4–9 (9)	Buck Baynor	TKO	3 (4)	Sep 27, 1898	Monumental Amphitheatre, Baltimore, Maryland, US	
83	Win	61–4–9 (9)	Herman Miller	PTS	4	Sep 26, 1898	Monumental Amphitheatre, Baltimore, Maryland, US	
82	Win	60–4–9 (9)	Thomas Jackson	KO	3 (25), 1:32	Sep 1, 1898	Talbot county fair, Easton, Maryland, US	
81	Win	59–4–9 (9)	Young Smyrna	TKO	15 (25), 2:23	Aug 26, 1898	Ford Opera House, Baltimore, Maryland, US	
80	Win	58–4–9 (9)	Billy Ernst	KO	11 (25)	Aug 8, 1898	Greater New York A.C., New York City, US	
79	Win	57–4–9 (9)	George Brown	TKO	6 (10)	Jul 1, 1898	Ford Opera House, Baltimore, Maryland, US	
78	Win	56–4–9 (9)	Joe Kid Robinson	PTS	6	Jun 3, 1898	Tattersall's, Chicago, Illinois, US	
77	NC	55–4–9 (9)	Joe Kid Robinson	NC	3 (6)	Jun 2, 1898	Tattersall's, Chicago, Illinois, US	The lights went out in the building, and the show had to be called off until next day.
76	Win	55–4–9 (8)	Steve Crosby	RTD	6 (20)	May 11, 1898	Music Hall, Louisville, Kentucky, US	
75	Win	54–4–9 (8)	Young Starlight	TKO	3 (3)	Apr 11, 1898	Music Hall, Baltimore, Maryland, US	Second fight in a day
74	Win	53–4–9 (8)	Young Smyrna	TKO	3 (3)	Apr 11, 1898	Music Hall, Baltimore, Maryland, US	Police stopped the fight.
73	Win	52–4–9 (8)	Tommy Shortell	TKO	6 (8)	Mar 11, 1898	Academy Music Hall, Baltimore, Maryland, US	
72	Win	51–4–9 (8)	Frank Garrard	TKO	15 (20)	Jan 17, 1898	Central Armory, Cleveland, Ohio, US	
71	Win	50–4–9 (9)	Billy Young	TKO	2 (8)	Jan 3, 1898	Eureka Athletic Club, Baltimore, Maryland, US	
70	Win	49–4–9 (8)	Stanton Abbott	TKO	5 (8), 2:15	Nov 29, 1897	Academy of Music, Baltimore, Maryland, US	
69	Draw	48–4–9 (8)	Wilmington Jack Daly	NWS	6	Nov 6, 1897	Arena, Philadelphia, Pennsylvania, US	
68	Loss	48–4–9 (7)	Bobby Dobbs	PTS	20	Sep 27, 1897	Greenpoint S.C., New York City, US	For world colored lightweight title
67	Draw	48–3–9 (7)	Young Griffo	PTS	15	Sep 21, 1897	Olympic A.C., Athens, Pennsylvania, US	
66	Win	48–3–8 (7)	Izzy Strauss	KO	5 (15)	Aug 30, 1897	Eureka Athletic Club, Baltimore, Maryland, US	
65	Win	47–3–8 (7)	Jack McCue	TKO	6 (?)	Aug 24, 1897	Shell road, Baltimore, Maryland, US	Fifth fight in a day
64	Win	46–3–8 (7)	John Coates	TKO	5 (?)	Aug 24, 1897	Shell road, Baltimore, Maryland, US	Fourth fight in a day
63	Win	45–3–8 (7)	Jerry Marshall	TKO	8 (?)	Aug 24, 1897	Shell road, Baltimore, Maryland, US	Third fight in a day
62	Win	44–3–8 (7)	George Thomas	TKO	3 (?)	Aug 24, 1897	Shell road, Baltimore, Maryland, US	Second fight in a day
61	Win	43–3–8 (7)	August Stenzie	TKO	3 (?)	Aug 24, 1897	Shell road, Baltimore, Maryland, US	
60	Win	42–3–8 (7)	Mike Leonard	PTS	20	May 18, 1897	Olympic A.C., San Francisco, California, US	
59	Win	41–3–8 (7)	Howard Wilson	KO	9 (20)	Apr 3, 1897	Polo A.C., New York City, US	
58	Win	40–3–8 (7)	Charles Rochette	RTD	4 (10)	Dec 14, 1896	Woodward's Pavilion, San Francisco, California, US	
57	Win	39–3–8 (7)	Jerry Marshall	PTS	20	Nov 12, 1896	Eureka Athletic Club, Baltimore, Maryland, US	
56	Win	38–3–8 (7)	Jack Williams	TKO	3 (8)	Oct 19, 1896	Eureka Athletic Club, Baltimore, Maryland, US	Police stopped the fight.
55	Loss	37–3–8 (7)	Dal Hawkins	PTS	15	Oct 6, 1896	Bohemian Sporting Club, New York City, US	
54	Win	37–2–8 (7)	John Ball	PTS	4	Sep 28, 1896	East Side A.C., Philadelphia, Pennsylvania, US	
53	Draw	36–2–8 (7)	Danny McBride	PTS	20	Aug 31, 1896	Eureka Athletic Club, Baltimore, Maryland, US	
52	Win	36–2–7 (7)	Jack Williams	TKO	2 (?)	Aug 20, 1896	Eureka Athletic Club, Baltimore, Maryland, US	
51	Win	35–2–7 (7)	Tommy Butler	PTS	12	Jun 29, 1896	South Brooklyn A.C., New York City, US	
50	Win	34–2–7 (7)	Jimmy Watson	PTS	10	Jun 8, 1896	Bijou Theater, Paterson, New Jersey, US	
49	Win	33–2–7 (7)	Jimmy Kennard	TKO	6 (12)	Feb 22, 1896	West Newton Street Armory, Boston, Massachusetts, US	
48	Win	32–2–7 (7)	Joe Elliott	KO	7 (8)	Jan 17, 1896	Eureka Athletic Club, Baltimore, Maryland, US	
47	Win	31–2–7 (7)	Benny Peterson	PTS	4	Jan 11, 1896	Ariel A.C., Philadelphia, Pennsylvania, US	
46	Win	30–2–7 (7)	George Siddons	KO	7 (25), 2:50	Nov 28, 1895	Eureka Athletic Club, Baltimore, Maryland, US	
45	Draw	29–2–7 (7)	Young Griffo	PTS	10	Nov 18, 1895	Front Street Theater, Baltimore, Maryland, US	Pre-arranged draw if lasting full distance.
44	Win	29–2–6 (7)	Joe Elliott	KO	9 (25)	Oct 21, 1895	Eureka Athletic Club, Baltimore, Maryland, US	
43	Draw	28–2–6 (7)	George Siddons	PTS	20	Jul 15, 1895	Eureka Athletic Club, Baltimore, Maryland, US	
42	Win	28–2–5 (7)	Howard Wilson	PTS	10	May 28, 1895	Kernan's Theatre, Washington, D.C., US	
41	Win	27–2–5 (7)	Benny Peterson	KO	17 (20)	May 20, 1895	Riverside Athletic Club, New York City, US	
40	Win	26–2–5 (7)	George Willis	KO	4 (10)	May 14, 1895	Monumental Amphitheatre, Baltimore, Maryland, US	
39	Draw	25–2–5 (7)	Howard Wilson	PTS	6	May 9, 1895	Monumental Amphitheatre, Baltimore, Maryland, US	
38	Win	25–2–4 (7)	Frank Peabody	TKO	3 (8)	May 4, 1895	Monumental Amphitheatre, Baltimore, Maryland, US	
37	Win	24–2–4 (7)	Kentucky Rosebud	TKO	8 (8)	Apr 25, 1895	Front Street Theater, Baltimore, Maryland, US	
36	Win	23–2–4 (7)	David Armstrong	TKO	3 (6)	Apr 18, 1895	Monumental Amphitheatre, Baltimore, Maryland, US	
35	Loss	22–2–4 (7)	Johnny Van Heest	PTS	9 (8)	Apr 13, 1895	Monumental Amphitheatre, Baltimore, Maryland, US	Gans had Van Heese whipped to a standstill in the eighth round, but Mr. Daniel Carr, the referee, ordered an extra round. Though Van Heest had none the best of the last round, he was given the decision.
34	Win	22–1–4 (7)	Kentucky Rosebud	NWS	6	Apr 1, 1895	Monumental Amphitheater, Baltimore, Maryland, US	
33	Win	22–1–4 (6)	Paul Johnson	PTS	6	Mar 22, 1895	Monumental Theatre, Baltimore, Maryland, US	
32	Win	21–1–4 (6)	Harry Hunt	TKO	4 (?)	Mar 20, 1895	Monumental Theatre, Baltimore, Maryland, US	
31	Draw	20–1–4 (6)	Howard Wilson	PTS	10	Mar 18, 1895	Monumental Theatre, Baltimore, Maryland, US	
30	Draw	20–1–3 (6)	Fred Sweigert	PTS	10	Mar 7, 1895	Monumental Theatre, Baltimore, Maryland, US	
29	Win	20–1–2 (6)	Solomon English	TKO	10 (10)	Mar 6, 1895	Monumental Theatre, Baltimore, Maryland, US	Police interfered.
28	Win	19–1–2 (6)	Max Wirsing	TKO	3 (?)	Mar 4, 1895	Monumental Theatre, Baltimore, Maryland, US	
27	Draw	18–1–2 (6)	James Daly	PTS	11 (10)	Feb 16, 1895	Monumental Theatre, Baltimore, Maryland, US	An extra-round was fought.
26	Win	18–1–1 (6)	James Davis	KO	3 (10)	Feb 12, 1895	Kernan's Theater, Baltimore, Maryland, US	Second fight in one day
25	Win	17–1–1 (6)	John Ball	PTS	6	Feb 12, 1895	Kernan's Theater, Baltimore, Maryland, US	
24	Win	16–1–1 (6)	John Coates	PTS	11 (10)	Feb 11, 1895	Monumental Theatre, Baltimore, Maryland, US	An additional round was fought to decide the winner.
23	Win	15–1–1 (6)	Samuel Young	KO	3 (?)	Feb 7, 1895	Monumental Theatre, Baltimore, Maryland, US	
22	Win	14–1–1 (6)	Fred Sweigert	PTS	10	Feb 6, 1895	Monumental Theatre, Baltimore, Maryland, US	
21	Draw	13–1–1 (6)	Dave Horn	PTS	10	Jan 23, 1895	Monumental Theatre, Baltimore, Maryland, US	
20	Win	13–1 (6)	George Brummell	TKO	5 (?)	Jan 19, 1895	Monumental Theatre, Baltimore, Maryland, US	
19	Win	12–1 (6)	Paul Johnson	PTS	10	Jan 11, 1895	Monumental Theatre, Baltimore, Maryland, US	
18	Win	11–1 (6)	Bud Brown	PTS	10	Jan 7, 1895	Monumental Theatre, Baltimore, Maryland, US	Second fight in one day after Allen's corner man offered to fight Gans
17	Win	10–1 (6)	Samuel Allen	KO	3 (?)	Jan 7, 1895	Monumental Theatre, Baltimore, Maryland, US	
16	Win	9–1 (6)	Fred Sweigert	PTS	?	Jan 1, 1895	Monumental Theatre, Baltimore, Maryland, US	
15	Win	8–1 (6)	Jack McDonald	TKO	8 (?)	Dec 28, 1894	Monumental Theatre, Baltimore, Maryland, US	
14	Win	7–1 (6)	John Coates	PTS	10	Dec 27, 1894	Monumental A.C., Baltimore, Maryland, US	
13	Win	6–1 (6)	Fred Sweigert	NWS	10	Dec 21, 1894	Monumental A.C., Baltimore, Maryland, US	
12	Win	6–1 (5)	Travis Brown	PTS	6	Dec 17, 1894	Avon Club, Baltimore, Maryland, US	
11	ND	5–1 (5)	Bud Young	ND	4	Nov 27, 1894	Canton Academy, Baltimore, Maryland, US	
10	ND	5–1 (4)	Paul Johnson	ND	3 (?)	Nov 12, 1894	Grand Army Hall, Baltimore, Maryland, US	Gans was fouled and could not continue. Ruled a no decision
9	Win	5–1 (3)	Jackson	TKO	3 (4)	Jul 10, 1894	Kernan's Theatre, Washington, D.C., US	
8	Loss	4–1 (3)	Paul Johnson	PTS	5	Jun 27, 1894	Monumental Theatre, Baltimore, Maryland, US	For vacant Maryland colored lightweight title
7	Win	4–0 (3)	Gustav Wilkie	PTS	4	Jun 26, 1894	Monumental Theatre, Baltimore, Maryland, US	
6	ND	3–0 (3)	Robert Cook	ND	?	May 21, 1894	M F Conklin's Hall, Baltimore, Maryland, US	
5	Win	3–0 (2)	Harry Brian	PTS	?	Apr 25, 1894	Allerino Gannic Casino, Baltimore, Maryland, US	
4	ND	2–0 (2)	Dave Horn	ND	3 (?)	Apr 19, 1894	Beach's Hall, Baltimore, Maryland, US	
3	Win	2–0 (1)	William Jones	KO	4 (?)	Feb 12, 1894	Avon Club, Baltimore, Maryland, US	
2	Win	1–0 (1)	William Jones	RTD	6 (?)	Nov 27, 1893	Avon Club, Baltimore, Maryland, US	
1	ND	0–0 (1)	Buck Myers	ND	?	Oct 23, 1893	Avon Club, Baltimore, Maryland, US	

=== Unofficial record ===
199 fights	160 wins	12 losses
By knockout	101	5
By decision	52	7
By disqualification	7	0
Draws	21	
No contests	6	

Record with the inclusion of newspaper decisions in the win/loss/draw column.

No.	Result	Record	Opponent	Type	Round, time	Date	Location	Notes
199	Win	160–12–21 (6)	Jabez White	NWS	10	Mar 12, 1909	National S.C., New York City, US	
198	Loss	159–12–21 (6)	Battling Nelson	KO	21 (45)	Sep 9, 1908	Mission Street Arena, Colma, California, US	For world lightweight title
197	Loss	159–11–21 (6)	Battling Nelson	KO	17 (45)	Jul 4, 1908	Mission Street Arena, Colma, California, US	Lost world lightweight title
196	Win	159–10–21 (6)	Rudy Unholz	TKO	11 (20)	May 14, 1908	Coliseum, San Francisco, California, US	Retained world lightweight title
195	Win	158–10–21 (6)	Frank 'Spike' Robson	TKO	3 (6), 2:25	Apr 1, 1908	National A.C., Philadelphia, Pennsylvania, US	
194	Win	157–10–21 (6)	Bob Blackburn	KO	3 (5)	Jan 3, 1908	Germania Maennerchor Hall, Baltimore, Maryland, US	
193	Win	156–10–21 (6)	George Memsic	PTS	20	Sep 27, 1907	Naud Junction Pavilion, Los Angeles, California	Retained world lightweight title
192	Win	155–10–21 (6)	Jimmy Britt	TKO	6 (20)	Sep 9, 1907	Recreation Park, San Francisco, California, US	Retained world lightweight title
191	Win	154–10–21 (6)	Kid Herman	KO	8 (?)	Jan 1, 1907	Casino A.C. Arena, Tonopah, California, US	Retained world lightweight title
190	Win	153–10–21 (6)	Battling Nelson	DQ	42 ($\infty$)	Sep 3, 1906	Casino Amphitheatre, Goldfield, Nevada, US	Retained world lightweight title; A fight to the finish
189	Win	152–10–21 (6)	Dave Holly	PTS	20	Jul 23, 1906	Pleasant Beach, Bainbridge Island, Washington, US	Retained world lightweight title
188	Win	151–10–21 (6)	Jack Blackburn	NWS	6	Jun 29, 1906	National A.C., Philadelphia, Pennsylvania, US	
187	Draw	150–10–21 (6)	Harry Lewis	NWS	6	Jun 15, 1906	National A.C., Philadelphia, Pennsylvania, US	
186	Loss	150–10–20 (6)	Willie Lewis	NWS	6	May 18, 1906	Madison Square Garden, New York City, US	
185	Win	150–9–20 (6)	Mike "Twin" Sullivan	TKO	10 (20)	Mar 17, 1906	Chutes Park, Los Angeles, California	Retained world welterweight title claim at 142 lbs; Police stopped the fight
184	Win	149–9–20 (6)	Mike 'Twin' Sullivan	KO	15 (20), 1:15	Jan 19, 1906	Woodward's Pavilion, San Francisco, California, US	Gans claims world welterweight title at 142lbs
183	Draw	148–9–20 (6)	Mike 'Twin' Sullivan	PTS	15	Sep 15, 1905	Lyric Theater, Baltimore, Maryland, US	Retained world lightweight title; Pre-arranged draw if lasting the distance
182	Win	148–9–19 (6)	Rufe Turner	NWS	6	Mar 27, 1905	Washington S.C., Philadelphia, Pennsylvania, US	
181	Win	147–9–19 (6)	Jimmy Britt	DQ	5 (20), 0:30	Oct 31, 1904	Mechanic's Pavilion, San Francisco, California, US	Retained world lightweight title; Britt DQ'd for hitting Gans while he was rising from a knockdown
180	Draw	146–9–19 (6)	Barbados Joe Walcott	PTS	20	Sep 30, 1904	Woodward's Pavilion, San Francisco, California, US	
179	Draw	146–9–18 (6)	Dave Holly	NWS	6	Jun 27, 1904	National A.C., Philadelphia, Pennsylvania, US	
178	Win	146–9–17 (6)	Sammy Smith	TKO	4 (6)	Jun 13, 1904	National A.C., Philadelphia, Pennsylvania, US	
177	Win	145–9–17 (6)	Kid Griffo	TKO	7 (15)	Jun 3, 1904	Germania Maennerchor Hall, Baltimore, Maryland, US	
176	Win	144–9–17 (6)	Jewey Cook	RTD	7 (10)	May 27, 1904	Germania Maennerchor Hall, Baltimore, Maryland, US	
175	Win	143–9–17 (6)	Sam Bolen	PTS	15	Apr 21, 1904	Germania Maennerchor Hall, Baltimore, Maryland, US	
174	Win	142–9–17 (6)	Gus Gardner	PTS	10	Mar 28, 1904	Arbelten Hall, Saginaw, Michigan, US	
173	Win	141–9–17 (6)	Jack Blackburn	PTS	15	Mar 25, 1904	Germania Maennerchor Hall, Baltimore, Maryland, US	
172	Win	140–9–17 (6)	Mike Ward	TKO	10 (10)	Feb 2, 1904	Light Guard Armory, Detroit, Michigan, US	
171	Win	139–9–17 (6)	Joe Grim	PTS	10	Jan 22, 1904	Shlegel's Hall, Baltimore, Maryland, US	
170	Win	138–9–17 (6)	Clarence Connors	TKO	2 (6)	Jan 19, 1904	Mount Clemens, Michigan, US	
169	Win	137–9–17 (6)	Willie Fitzgerald	PTS	10	Jan 12, 1904	Light Guard Armory, Detroit, Michigan, US	Retained world lightweight title
168	Loss	136–9–17 (6)	Sam Langford	PTS	15	Dec 8, 1903	Criterion A.C., Boston, Massachusetts, US	
167	Win	136–8–17 (6)	Dave Holly	NWS	6	Dec 7, 1903	Washington S.C., Philadelphia, Pennsylvania, US	
166	Loss	135–8–17 (6)	Jack Blackburn	NWS	6	Nov 2, 1903	Washington S.C., Philadelphia, Pennsylvania, US	
165	Draw	135–7–17 (6)	Dave Holly	NWS	6	Oct 23, 1903	State A.C., Philadelphia, Pennsylvania, US	
164	Win	135–7–16 (6)	Eddie Kennedy	NWS	6	Oct 20, 1903	Southern A.C., Philadelphia, Pennsylvania, US	
163	Win	134–7–16 (6)	Joe Grim	NWS	6	Oct 19, 1903	Washington S.C., Philadelphia, Pennsylvania, US	
162	Win	133–7–16 (6)	Buddy King	KO	5 (20)	Jul 4, 1903	Old Baseball Park, Butte, Montana, US	
161	Win	132–7–16 (6)	Willie Fitzgerald	KO	10 (20)	May 29, 1903	Mechanic's Pavilion, San Francisco, California, US	
160	Win	131–7–16 (6)	Tom Tracey	TKO	9 (20)	May 13, 1903	Pastime A.C., Portland, Oregon, US	
159	Win	130–7–16 (6)	Jack Bennett	KO	5 (10)	Mar 23, 1903	Masonic Hall, Allegheny, Pennsylvania, US	
158	Win	129–7–16 (6)	Steve Crosby	TKO	11 (20)	Mar 11, 1903	Whittington Park, Hot Springs, Arkansas, US	Retained world lightweight title
157	Win	128–7–16 (6)	Gus Gardner	DQ	11 (20), 1:05	Jan 1, 1903	Casino, New Britain, Connecticut, US	Retained world lightweight title
156	Draw	127–7–16 (6)	Charley Siegar	PTS	10	Dec 31, 1902	Criterion A.C., Boston, Massachusetts, US	Pre-arranged draw if lasting the distance.
155	Win	127–7–15 (6)	Howard Wilson	TKO	3 (20)	Dec 19, 1902	Scituate Athletic Club, Scituate, Rhode Island, US	
154	Win	126–7–15 (6)	Charley Siegar	TKO	14 (20)	Nov 14, 1902	Germania Maennerchor Hall, Baltimore, Maryland, US	Retained world lightweight title
153	Win	125–7–15 (6)	Dave Holly	NWS	10	Oct 14, 1902	Maennerchor Hall, Lancaster, Pennsylvania, US	
152	Win	124–7–15 (6)	Kid McPartland	KO	5 (20), 2:25	Oct 13, 1902	International A.C., Fort Erie, Ontario, Canada	Retained world lightweight title
151	Win	123–7–15 (6)	Jack Bennett	KO	2 (6)	Sep 22, 1902	Golden Gate A.C., Philadelphia, Pennsylvania, US	
150	Win	122–7–15 (6)	Gus Gardner	KO	5 (20)	Sep 17, 1902	Music Hall, Baltimore, Maryland, US	
149	Win	121–7–15 (6)	Rufe Turner	KO	15 (15)	Jul 24, 1902	Acme A.C., Oakland, California, US	Retained world lightweight title
148	Win	120–7–15 (6)	George 'Elbows' McFadden	TKO	3 (20)	Jun 27, 1902	Woodward's Pavilion, San Francisco, California, US	Retained world lightweight title
147	Win	119–7–15 (6)	St. Mary's County Bully	DQ	3 (4)	May 29, 1902	Monumental Theater, Baltimore, Maryland, US	
146	Win	118–7–15 (6)	Charles Boyer	TKO	2 (4)	May 28, 1902	Monumental Theater, Baltimore, Maryland, US	
145	Win	117–7–15 (6)	Edward Snowden	KO	2 (4)	May 28, 1902	Monumental Theater, Baltimore, Maryland, US	
144	Win	116–7–15 (6)	Joe Burke	RTD	2 (4)	May 27, 1902	Monumental Theater, Baltimore, Maryland, US	
143	Win	115–7–15 (6)	Frank Erne	KO	1 (20), 1:40	May 12, 1902	International A.C., Fort Erie, Ontario, Canada	Won world lightweight title
142	Win	114–7–15 (6)	Jack Bennett	KO	5 (20)	Mar 27, 1902	Ford Opera House, Baltimore, Maryland, US	
141	Win	113–7–15 (6)	Jack Ryan	TKO	4 (15)	Mar 7, 1902	Keystone A.C., Allentown, Pennsylvania, US	
140	Win	112–7–15 (6)	George 'Elbows' McFadden	NWS	6	Feb 17, 1902	Penn Art Club, Philadelphia, Pennsylvania, US	
139	Win	111–7–15 (6)	Eddie Connolly	DQ	5 (6)	Jan 6, 1902	Washington S.C., Philadelphia, Pennsylvania, US	Connolly DQ'd for head-butting Gans multiple times under the chin
138	Win	110–7–15 (6)	Tom Broderick	KO	6 (20)	Jan 3, 1902	Germania Maennerchor Hall, Baltimore, Maryland, US	
137	Win	109–7–15 (6)	Joe Youngs	TKO	4 (6)	Dec 30, 1901	Washington S.C., Philadelphia, Pennsylvania, US	Youngs quit in the middle of the round, with both of his eyes almost closed
136	Win	108–7–15 (6)	Bobby Dobbs	TKO	14 (20)	Dec 13, 1901	Germania Maennerchor Hall, Baltimore, Maryland, US	
135	Win	107–7–15 (6)	Billy Moore	KO	3 (20)	Nov 22, 1901	Eureka Athletic Club, Baltimore, Maryland, US	
134	Win	106–7–15 (6)	Jack Hanlon	KO	2 (20)	Nov 15, 1901	Germania Maennerchor Hall, Baltimore, Maryland, US	
133	Win	105–7–15 (6)	Dan McConnell	KO	3 (8)	Oct 4, 1901	Germania Maennerchor Hall, Baltimore, Maryland, US	
132	Win	104–7–15 (6)	Joe Handler	TKO	1 (20)	Sep 30, 1901	Trenton A.C., Trenton, New Jersey, US	
131	Win	103–7–15 (6)	Steve Crosby	TKO	12 (20)	Sep 20, 1901	Germania Maennerchor Hall, Baltimore, Maryland, US	Police stopped the fight
130	Draw	102–7–15 (6)	Steve Crosby	PTS	20	Aug 23, 1901	Music Hall, Louisville, Kentucky, US	Retained world colored lightweight title
129	Win	102–7–14 (6)	Kid Thomas	NWS	6	Jul 15, 1901	Ford Opera House, Baltimore, Maryland, US	Third fight in one day
128	Win	101–7–14 (6)	Jack Donahue	TKO	2 (6)	Jul 15, 1901	Ford Opera House, Baltimore, Maryland, US	Second fight in one day
127	Win	100–7–14 (6)	Harry Berger	NWS	6	Jul 15, 1901	Ford Opera House, Baltimore, Maryland, US	
126	Win	99–7–14 (6)	Bobby Dobbs	KO	7 (20)	May 31, 1901	Eureka Athletic Club, Baltimore, Maryland, US	
125	Win	98–7–14 (6)	Martin Flaherty	TKO	4 (20)	Apr 1, 1901	Ford's Theater, Baltimore, Maryland, US	
124	Win	97–7–14 (6)	Wilmington Jack Daly	DQ	5 (20), 2:05	Feb 13, 1901	Music Hall, Baltimore, Maryland, US	
123	Loss	96–7–14 (6)	Terry McGovern	KO	2 (6), 2:05	Dec 13, 1900	Tattersall's, Chicago, Illinois, US	
122	Win	96–6–14 (6)	Kid Parker	KO	4 (10)	Nov 16, 1900	Colorado A.C., Denver, Colorado, US	
121	Win	95–6–14 (6)	Jimmy 'Spider' Kelly	TKO	8 (10)	Oct 19, 1900	Colorado A.C., Denver, Colorado, US	
120	Win	94–6–14 (6)	Otto Sieloff	KO	9 (10)	Oct 16, 1900	Olympic A.C., Denver, Colorado, US	
119	Win	93–6–14 (6)	Alec Johnson	KO	1 (5), 2:23	Oct 11, 1900	Leadville Athletic Club, Leadville, Colorado, US	
118	Win	92–6–14 (6)	Bird Leg Collins	TKO	4 (5)	Oct 11, 1900	Leadville Athletic Club, Leadville, Colorado, US	
117	Win	91–6–14 (6)	Joe Youngs	PTS	10	Oct 5, 1900	Colorado A.A., Denver, Colorado, US	
116	Draw	90–6–14 (6)	George 'Elbows' McFadden	PTS	10	Oct 2, 1900	Olympic A.C., Denver, Colorado, US	
115	Win	90–6–13 (6)	George 'Elbows' McFadden	NWS	6	Sep 7, 1900	Penn Art Club, Philadelphia, Pennsylvania, US	
114	Win	89–6–13 (6)	Dal Hawkins	KO	3 (25)	Aug 31, 1900	Broadway A.C., New York City, US	Time was either 2:21 or 2:57
113	Win	88–6–13 (6)	Whitey Lester	KO	4 (20)	Jul 12, 1900	Ford Opera House, Baltimore, Maryland, US	
112	Win	87–6–13 (6)	Young Griffo	TKO	8 (25), 1:38	Jul 10, 1900	Seaside A.C., Coney Island, New York, US	
111	Win	86–6–13 (6)	Barney Furey	KO	9 (15)	Jun 26, 1900	People's Theater, Cincinnati, Ohio, US	
110	Win	85–6–13 (6)	Dal Hawkins	KO	2 (25), 1:15	May 25, 1900	Broadway A.C., New York City, US	
109	Win	84–6–13 (6)	Chicago Jack Daly	TKO	5 (6)	Apr 1, 1900	Penn Art Club, Philadelphia, Pennsylvania, US	
108	Loss	83–6–13 (6)	Frank Erne	TKO	12 (25)	Mar 23, 1900	Broadway A.C., New York City, US	For world lightweight title; Gans asked to have the bout stopped after being cut by an accidental head-butt.
107	Win	83–5–13 (6)	Spike Sullivan	TKO	14 (25), 2:17	Feb 9, 1900	Broadway A.C., New York City, US	
106	Draw	82–5–13 (6)	Kid McPartland	PTS	6	Dec 22, 1899	Star Theatre, Chicago, Illinois, US	
105	Win	82–5–12 (6)	Kid Ash	PTS	15	Dec 11, 1899	Robinson Opera House, Cincinnati, Ohio, US	
104	Win	81–5–12 (6)	Steve Crosby	PTS	6	Nov 24, 1899	Star Theatre, Chicago, Illinois, US	
103	Win	80–5–12 (6)	George 'Elbows' McFadden	PTS	25	Oct 31, 1899	Broadway A.C., New York City, US	
102	Win	79–5–12 (6)	Martin Judge	PTS	20	Oct 11, 1899	Germania Maennerchor Hall, Baltimore, Maryland, US	
101	Draw	78–5–12 (6)	Wilmington Jack Daly	NWS	6	Oct 7, 1899	Nonpareil A.C., Philadelphia, Pennsylvania, US	
100	Win	78–5–11 (6)	Jimmy 'Spider' Kelly	PTS	25	Oct 3, 1899	Lenox A.C., New York City, US	
99	Win	77–5–11 (6)	Martin Judge	PTS	12 (20)	Sep 15, 1899	Music Hall, Baltimore, Maryland, US	Police stopped the fight at the end of the 12th round on account of foul work in the clinches.
98	Win	76–5–11 (6)	Eugene Bezenah	KO	10 (25), 2:23	Sep 1, 1899	Broadway A.C., New York City, US	
97	Draw	75–5–11 (6)	George 'Elbows' McFadden	PTS	25	Jul 28, 1899	Broadway A.C., New York City, US	
96	Win	75–5–10 (6)	Jack Dobbs	TKO	4 (25)	Jul 24, 1899	Seabright Casino, Ocean City, Maryland, US	
95	Loss	74–5–10 (6)	George 'Elbows' McFadden	KO	23 (25)	Apr 14, 1899	Broadway A.C., Brooklyn, New York City, US	
94	Win	74–4–10 (6)	Billy Ernst	DQ	10 (20)	Feb 6, 1899	Olympic A.C., Buffalo, New York, US	Ernst DQ'd for headbutting Gans
93	Win	73–4–10 (6)	Martin Judge	PTS	20	Jan 28, 1899	Crescent A.C., Toronto, Ontario, Canada	
92	Win	72–4–10 (6)	Young Smyrna	KO	2 (25), 2:50	Jan 13, 1899	Germania Maennerchor Hall, Baltimore, Maryland, US	
91	Win	71–4–10 (6)	Wilmington Jack Daly	PTS	25	Dec 27, 1898	Lenox A.C., New York City, US	
90	Win	70–4–10 (6)	Kid McPartland	PTS	25	Nov 4, 1898	Lenox A.C., New York City, US	
89	Win	69–4–10 (6)	William Duke	PTS	4	Sep 30, 1898	Monumental Amphitheatre, Baltimore, Maryland, US	
88	Win	68–4–10 (6)	Fred Sweigert	PTS	4	Sep 29, 1898	Monumental Amphitheatre, Baltimore, Maryland, US	
87	Win	67–4–10 (6)	James Martin	TKO	4 (4)	Sep 28, 1898	Monumental Amphitheatre, Baltimore, Maryland, US	
86	Win	66–4–10 (6)	Joseph Smith	TKO	1 (4)	Sep 27, 1898	Monumental Amphitheatre, Baltimore, Maryland, US	Third fight in one day
85	Win	65–4–10 (6)	William Hinton	TKO	1 (4)	Sep 27, 1898	Monumental Amphitheatre, Baltimore, Maryland, US	Second fight in one day
84	Win	64–4–10 (6)	Buck Baynor	TKO	3 (4)	Sep 27, 1898	Monumental Amphitheatre, Baltimore, Maryland, US	
83	Win	63–4–10 (6)	Herman Miller	PTS	4	Sep 26, 1898	Monumental Amphitheatre, Baltimore, Maryland, US	
82	Win	62–4–10 (6)	Thomas Jackson	KO	3 (25), 1:32	Sep 1, 1898	Talbot county fair, Easton, Maryland, US	
81	Win	61–4–10 (6)	Young Smyrna	TKO	15 (25), 2:23	Aug 26, 1898	Ford Opera House, Baltimore, Maryland, US	
80	Win	60–4–10 (6)	Billy Ernst	KO	11 (25)	Aug 8, 1898	Greater New York A.C., New York City, US	
79	Win	59–4–10 (6)	George Brown	TKO	6 (10)	Jul 1, 1898	Ford Opera House, Baltimore, Maryland, US	
78	Win	58–4–10 (6)	Joe Kid Robinson	PTS	6	Jun 3, 1898	Tattersall's, Chicago, Illinois, US	
77	NC	57–4–10 (6)	Joe Kid Robinson	NC	3 (6)	Jun 2, 1898	Tattersall's, Chicago, Illinois, US	The lights went out in the building, and the show had to be called off until next day.
76	Win	57–4–10 (5)	Steve Crosby	RTD	6 (20)	May 11, 1898	Music Hall, Louisville, Kentucky, US	
75	Win	56–4–10 (5)	Young Starlight	TKO	3 (3)	Apr 11, 1898	Music Hall, Baltimore, Maryland, US	Second fight in a day
74	Win	55–4–10 (5)	Young Smyrna	TKO	3 (3)	Apr 11, 1898	Music Hall, Baltimore, Maryland, US	Police stopped the fight.
73	Win	54–4–10 (5)	Tommy Shortell	TKO	6 (8)	Mar 11, 1898	Academy Music Hall, Baltimore, Maryland, US	
72	Win	53–4–10 (5)	Frank Garrard	TKO	15 (20)	Jan 17, 1898	Central Armory, Cleveland, Ohio, US	
71	Win	52–4–10 (5)	Billy Young	TKO	2 (8)	Jan 3, 1898	Eureka Athletic Club, Baltimore, Maryland, US	
70	Win	51–4–10 (5)	Stanton Abbott	TKO	5 (8), 2:15	Nov 29, 1897	Academy of Music, Baltimore, Maryland, US	
69	Draw	50–4–10 (5)	Wilmington Jack Daly	NWS	6	Nov 6, 1897	Arena, Philadelphia, Pennsylvania, US	
68	Loss	50–4–9 (5)	Bobby Dobbs	PTS	20	Sep 27, 1897	Greenpoint S.C., New York City, US	For world colored lightweight title
67	Draw	50–3–9 (5)	Young Griffo	PTS	15	Sep 21, 1897	Olympic A.C., Athens, Pennsylvania, US	
66	Win	50–3–8 (5)	Izzy Strauss	KO	5 (15)	Aug 30, 1897	Eureka Athletic Club, Baltimore, Maryland, US	
65	Win	49–3–8 (5)	Jack McCue	TKO	6 (?)	Aug 24, 1897	Shell road, Baltimore, Maryland, US	Fifth fight in a day
64	Win	48–3–8 (5)	John Coates	TKO	5 (?)	Aug 24, 1897	Shell road, Baltimore, Maryland, US	Fourth fight in a day
63	Win	47–3–8 (5)	Jerry Marshall	TKO	8 (?)	Aug 24, 1897	Shell road, Baltimore, Maryland, US	Third fight in a day
62	Win	46–3–8 (5)	George Thomas	TKO	3 (?)	Aug 24, 1897	Shell road, Baltimore, Maryland, US	Second fight in a day
61	Win	45–3–8 (5)	August Stenzie	TKO	3 (?)	Aug 24, 1897	Shell road, Baltimore, Maryland, US	
60	Win	44–3–8 (5)	Mike Leonard	PTS	20	May 18, 1897	Olympic A.C., San Francisco, California, US	
59	Win	43–3–8 (5)	Howard Wilson	KO	9 (20)	Apr 3, 1897	Polo A.C., New York City, US	
58	Win	42–3–8 (5)	Charles Rochette	RTD	4 (10)	Dec 14, 1896	Woodward's Pavilion, San Francisco, California, US	
57	Win	41–3–8 (5)	Jerry Marshall	PTS	20	Nov 12, 1896	Eureka Athletic Club, Baltimore, Maryland, US	
56	Win	40–3–8 (5)	Jack Williams	TKO	3 (8)	Oct 19, 1896	Eureka Athletic Club, Baltimore, Maryland, US	Police stopped the fight.
55	Loss	39–3–8 (5)	Dal Hawkins	PTS	15	Oct 6, 1896	Bohemian Sporting Club, New York City, US	
54	Win	39–2–8 (5)	John Ball	PTS	4	Sep 28, 1896	East Side A.C., Philadelphia, Pennsylvania, US	
53	Draw	38–2–8 (5)	Danny McBride	PTS	20	Aug 31, 1896	Eureka Athletic Club, Baltimore, Maryland, US	
52	Win	38–2–7 (5)	Jack Williams	TKO	2 (?)	Aug 20, 1896	Eureka Athletic Club, Baltimore, Maryland, US	
51	Win	37–2–7 (5)	Tommy Butler	PTS	12	Jun 29, 1896	South Brooklyn A.C., New York City, US	
50	Win	36–2–7 (5)	Jimmy Watson	PTS	10	Jun 8, 1896	Bijou Theater, Paterson, New Jersey, US	
49	Win	35–2–7 (5)	Jimmy Kennard	TKO	6 (12)	Feb 22, 1896	West Newton Street Armory, Boston, Massachusetts, US	
48	Win	34–2–7 (5)	Joe Elliott	KO	7 (8)	Jan 17, 1896	Eureka Athletic Club, Baltimore, Maryland, US	
47	Win	33–2–7 (5)	Benny Peterson	PTS	4	Jan 11, 1896	Ariel A.C., Philadelphia, Pennsylvania, US	
46	Win	32–2–7 (5)	George Siddons	KO	7 (25), 2:50	Nov 28, 1895	Eureka Athletic Club, Baltimore, Maryland, US	
45	Draw	31–2–7 (5)	Young Griffo	PTS	10	Nov 18, 1895	Front Street Theater, Baltimore, Maryland, US	Pre-arranged draw if lasting full distance.
44	Win	31–2–6 (5)	Joe Elliott	KO	9 (25)	Oct 21, 1895	Eureka Athletic Club, Baltimore, Maryland, US	
43	Draw	30–2–6 (5)	George Siddons	PTS	20	Jul 15, 1895	Eureka Athletic Club, Baltimore, Maryland, US	
42	Win	30–2–5 (5)	Howard Wilson	PTS	10	May 28, 1895	Kernan's Theatre, Washington, D.C., US	
41	Win	29–2–5 (5)	Benny Peterson	KO	17 (20)	May 20, 1895	Riverside Athletic Club, New York City, US	
40	Win	28–2–5 (5)	George Willis	KO	4 (10)	May 14, 1895	Monumental Amphitheatre, Baltimore, Maryland, US	
39	Draw	27–2–5 (5)	Howard Wilson	PTS	6	May 9, 1895	Monumental Amphitheatre, Baltimore, Maryland, US	
38	Win	27–2–4 (5)	Frank Peabody	TKO	3 (8)	May 4, 1895	Monumental Amphitheatre, Baltimore, Maryland, US	
37	Win	26–2–4 (5)	Kentucky Rosebud	TKO	8 (8)	Apr 25, 1895	Front Street Theater, Baltimore, Maryland, US	
36	Win	25–2–4 (5)	David Armstrong	TKO	3 (6)	Apr 18, 1895	Monumental Amphitheatre, Baltimore, Maryland, US	
35	Loss	24–2–4 (5)	Johnny Van Heest	PTS	9 (8)	Apr 13, 1895	Monumental Amphitheatre, Baltimore, Maryland, US	Gans had Van Heese whipped to a standstill in the eighth round, but Mr. Daniel Carr, the referee, ordered an extra round. Though Van Heest had none the best of the last round, he was given the decision.
34	Win	24–1–4 (5)	Kentucky Rosebud	NWS	6	Apr 1, 1895	Monumental Amphitheater, Baltimore, Maryland, US	
33	Win	23–1–4 (5)	Paul Johnson	PTS	6	Mar 22, 1895	Monumental Theatre, Baltimore, Maryland, US	
32	Win	22–1–4 (5)	Harry Hunt	TKO	4 (?)	Mar 20, 1895	Monumental Theatre, Baltimore, Maryland, US	
31	Draw	21–1–4 (5)	Howard Wilson	PTS	10	Mar 18, 1895	Monumental Theatre, Baltimore, Maryland, US	
30	Draw	21–1–3 (5)	Fred Sweigert	PTS	10	Mar 7, 1895	Monumental Theatre, Baltimore, Maryland, US	
29	Win	21–1–2 (5)	Solomon English	TKO	10 (10)	Mar 6, 1895	Monumental Theatre, Baltimore, Maryland, US	Police interfered.
28	Win	20–1–2 (5)	Max Wirsing	TKO	3 (?)	Mar 4, 1895	Monumental Theatre, Baltimore, Maryland, US	
27	Draw	19–1–2 (5)	James Daly	PTS	11 (10)	Feb 16, 1895	Monumental Theatre, Baltimore, Maryland, US	An extra-round was fought.
26	Win	19–1–1 (5)	James Davis	KO	3 (10)	Feb 12, 1895	Kernan's Theater, Baltimore, Maryland, US	Second fight in one day
25	Win	18–1–1 (5)	John Ball	PTS	6	Feb 12, 1895	Kernan's Theater, Baltimore, Maryland, US	
24	Win	17–1–1 (5)	John Coates	PTS	11 (10)	Feb 11, 1895	Monumental Theatre, Baltimore, Maryland, US	An additional round was fought to decide the winner.
23	Win	16–1–1 (5)	Samuel Young	KO	3 (?)	Feb 7, 1895	Monumental Theatre, Baltimore, Maryland, US	
22	Win	15–1–1 (5)	Fred Sweigert	PTS	10	Feb 6, 1895	Monumental Theatre, Baltimore, Maryland, US	
21	Draw	14–1–1 (5)	Dave Horn	PTS	10	Jan 23, 1895	Monumental Theatre, Baltimore, Maryland, US	
20	Win	14–1 (5)	George Brummell	TKO	5 (?)	Jan 19, 1895	Monumental Theatre, Baltimore, Maryland, US	
19	Win	13–1 (5)	Paul Johnson	PTS	10	Jan 11, 1895	Monumental Theatre, Baltimore, Maryland, US	
18	Win	12–1 (5)	Bud Brown	PTS	10	Jan 7, 1895	Monumental Theatre, Baltimore, Maryland, US	Second fight in one day after Allen's corner man offered to fight Gans
17	Win	11–1 (5)	Samuel Allen	KO	3 (?)	Jan 7, 1895	Monumental Theatre, Baltimore, Maryland, US	
16	Win	10–1 (5)	Fred Sweigert	PTS	?	Jan 1, 1895	Monumental Theatre, Baltimore, Maryland, US	
15	Win	9–1 (5)	Jack McDonald	TKO	8 (?)	Dec 28, 1894	Monumental Theatre, Baltimore, Maryland, US	
14	Win	8–1 (5)	John Coates	PTS	10	Dec 27, 1894	Monumental A.C., Baltimore, Maryland, US	
13	Win	7–1 (5)	Fred Sweigert	NWS	10	Dec 21, 1894	Monumental A.C., Baltimore, Maryland, US	
12	Win	6–1 (5)	Travis Brown	PTS	6	Dec 17, 1894	Avon Club, Baltimore, Maryland, US	
11	ND	5–1 (5)	Bud Young	ND	4	Nov 27, 1894	Canton Academy, Baltimore, Maryland, US	
10	ND	5–1 (4)	Paul Johnson	ND	3 (?)	Nov 12, 1894	Grand Army Hall, Baltimore, Maryland, US	Gans was fouled and could not continue. Ruled a no decision
9	Win	5–1 (3)	Jackson	TKO	3 (4)	Jul 10, 1894	Kernan's Theatre, Washington, D.C., US	
8	Loss	4–1 (3)	Paul Johnson	PTS	5	Jun 27, 1894	Monumental Theatre, Baltimore, Maryland, US	For vacant Maryland colored lightweight title
7	Win	4–0 (3)	Gustav Wilkie	PTS	4	Jun 26, 1894	Monumental Theatre, Baltimore, Maryland, US	
6	ND	3–0 (3)	Robert Cook	ND	?	May 21, 1894	M F Conklin's Hall, Baltimore, Maryland, US	
5	Win	3–0 (2)	Harry Brian	PTS	?	Apr 25, 1894	Allerino Gannic Casino, Baltimore, Maryland, US	
4	ND	2–0 (2)	Dave Horn	ND	3 (?)	Apr 19, 1894	Beach's Hall, Baltimore, Maryland, US	
3	Win	2–0 (1)	William Jones	KO	4 (?)	Feb 12, 1894	Avon Club, Baltimore, Maryland, US	
2	Win	1–0 (1)	William Jones	RTD	6 (?)	Nov 27, 1893	Avon Club, Baltimore, Maryland, US	
1	ND	0–0 (1)	Buck Myers	ND	?	Oct 23, 1893	Avon Club, Baltimore, Maryland, US	

== Sports achievements ==
Awards and achievements
Preceded by Frank Erne	World Lightweight Champion; 12 May 1902 – 4 July 1908	Succeeded by Battling Nelson
Sporting positions
Preceded by George Dixon	Latest Born World Champion to Die; August 10 – October 15, 1910	Succeeded by Stanley Ketchel

== See also ==
- Lineal championship
