= Frank Erne =

Swiss boxer (1875–1954)

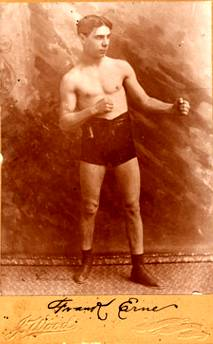

Personal information
- Nickname: "The Buffalo Boy"
- Nationality: American
- Born: Erwin Erne; January 8, 1875 Döttingen, Switzerland
- Died: September 17, 1954 (aged 79) New York City, New York, U.S.
- Height: 5 ft 6.5 in (169 cm)
- Weight: Featherweight; Lightweight

Boxing career
- Reach: 68 in (173 cm)
- Stance: Orthodox

Boxing record
- Total fights: 53
- Wins: 31
- Win by KO: 15
- Losses: 6
- Draws: 16

Frank Erne (January 8, 1875 – September 17, 1954) was a Swiss-born American boxer widely credited with taking the World Featherweight Championship on November 27, 1896, from George Dixon in New York City, as well as the World Lightweight Championship from George "Kid" Lavigne on July 3, 1899, in Buffalo, New York. Late in his career he would contend for the World Welterweight Title against Rube Ferns. Erne was posthumously inducted into the International Boxing Hall of Fame in the class of 2020.

== Early life and boxing career ==
Erne was born on January 8, 1875, in Döttingen, Switzerland, to a family of Swiss descent. His father once kept a vineyard near Zurich when he was a child, and after gaining success as a boxer in America, Frank purchased one for his father in New York. Not surprisingly, Frank took wine with his meals for much of his life, including the period he reigned as a world feather and lightweight champion.

At the age of seven he emigrated to the United States with his family. According to one source, in the early 1890s he worked setting pins in a bowling alley at the Buffalo Athletic Club where he began his training. During his career as a boxer, he worked as a manager of boxing classes, and physical culture schools.

Erne most prized his skills as a great strategist and "scientific boxer" rather than a strong puncher, and although his BoxRec record impressively shows 14 of 30 of his better publicized fights ending by knockout, few appear to be in early rounds. Apparently he could land a punch against a less skilled opponent when necessary, but he assigned greater value to what was known in his era as "ring generalship." Erne's favorite punch was a right to the chin, similar to an uppercut, after another boxer led with a left. Erne once told the Pittsburgh Press in an interview, "The majority of present day fighters are not ring generals, because they really are never called upon in a ten round bout to show ring generalship. But in the old days a fighter who wasn't a ring general never amounted to much and didn't last very long." Erne went on to note that it was the fighters with brains and not brawn who achieved the most during his boxing career.

Erne began to fight professionally by October 27, 1892, when he defeated John Roy at the Buffalo Athletic Club in New York in a fourth-round knockout, showing that he was not a boxer who lacked punching ability when the opportunity arose. The fight was billed as the Featherweight Championship of Western New York and paid the winner the princely sum of $250 according to the Buffalo Courier. Erne had defeated Roy by TKO one month earlier in Buffalo.

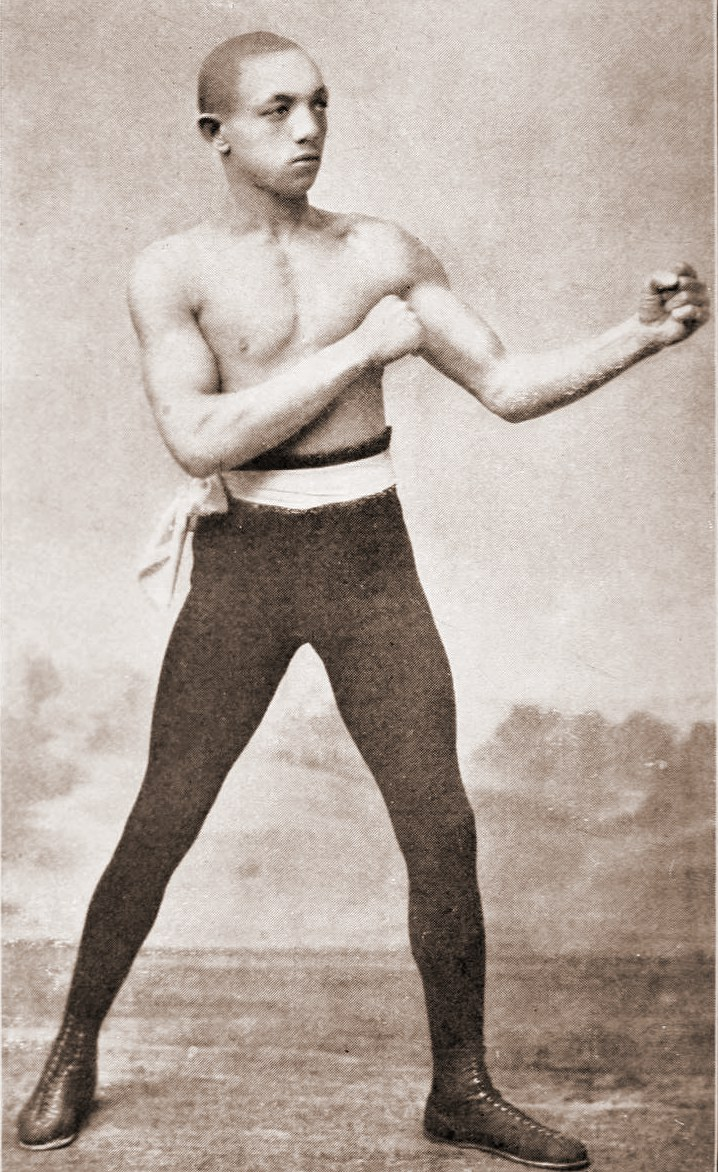
George Dixon Featherweight Champ

Erne first met World Featherweight Champion George Dixon in a ten-round draw on December 5, 1895, at the Manhattan Athletic Club in New York City. Two weeks later he fought well known Australian boxer "Young Griffo", an 1890 Featherweight World Champion, at the Music Hall in Buffalo. According to the New York Sun, Griffo, to the frustration of the crowd, dominated the brief four-round draw from the start and neither boxer put much effort into the fight.

== Winning the Featherweight World Title ==
Erne took the World Featherweight Title from Canadian born American Black boxer George Dixon on November 27, 1896, at the Broadway Athletic Club in New York in a twenty-round points decision, though Dixon was reluctant to acknowledge his loss of the championship. Though outweighing him by nine pounds, he lost the title to Dixon in a twenty-round points decision in Brooklyn on March 24, 1897, having held it only four months.

== Winning the Lightweight World Title ==
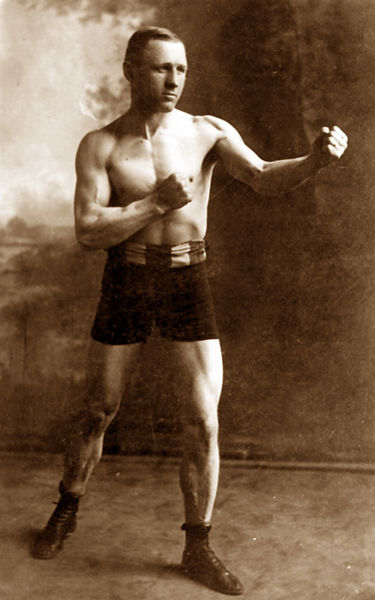
Kid Lavigne, Lightweight Champ

Already nearing the featherweight maximum after his loss of the title to George Dixon, Erne began fighting in the lightweight division, meeting George "Kid" Lavigne for his first Lightweight Title bout on September 28, 1898, in Brooklyn. The twenty-round draw would not determine a new champion.

In one of the most important bouts of his career, he took the world lightweight title from Kid Lavigne on July 3, 1899, in a twenty-round points decision before an enthusiastic home crowd in Buffalo. Looking back on Erne's critical win twenty years earlier, the St. Petersburg Times noted that Erne was more known for his speed and scientific skills than power, recalling that Lavigne had lost the title to "lighthitting Frank Erne." This description of Erne was more accurate when he faced his most gifted opponents.

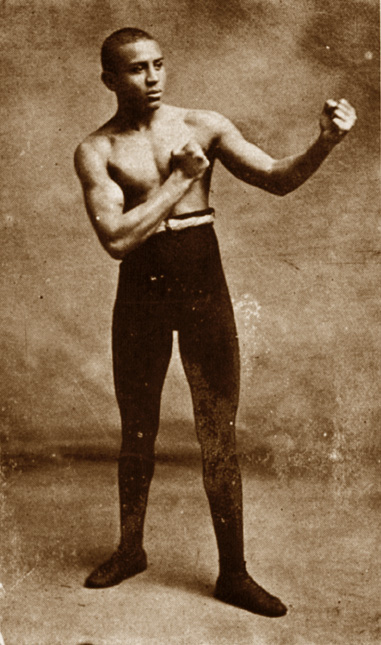
Joe Gans, Lightweight Champ

In a fight that some historians consider a greater show of skill than his two championship title wins, he successfully defended the lightweight title at New York's Broadway Athletic Club in a close bout against the incomparable lightweight Joe Gans on March 23, 1900. According to BoxRec, Gans had asked the fight to be stopped in the ninth round after being injured by an accidental headbutt from Erne. Other sources wrote that Erne had held a decisive edge in the bout, and continuously battered Gans in the face, before Gans finally ended the fight fearing permanent damage to his eye. No headbutt was mentioned in their account.

On July 16, 1900, Erne faced lightweight legend Terry McGovern in Madison Square Garden in New York. Erne had superior reach and height over McGovern, but according to most boxing writers, had not demonstrated the ability to consistently connect with the power of McGovern. Erne's ring generalship with his best opponents, was a slow, and deliberate strategy which took longer to end a fight. As the Bridgeport Herald wrote before the fight, "Erne's fights have been longer than Terry's as his record shows. He is not the finisher that Terry is. He is a point decision fighter more properly speaking and McGovern is a knockerout." Though putting McGovern down in the first round, Erne was down three times in the third before his cornermen ended the fight.

=== Rib injury in the Gardner bout ===
In a successful lightweight title defense, Erne met Curley Supples on March 17, 1902, in Ontario, winning by a sixth-round knockout. On March 21, 1902, according to the Pittsburg Press, he met Gus Gardner at the Wabash Club in Chicago. Showing amazing resiliency and determination for a non-title fight, he won a six-round victory on points, after breaking two ribs in the fourth round from a well placed right by Gardner. The article noted that Erne had received this diagnosis from a Doctor who examined him, and that he considered cancelling his bout with Gans. Possibly affecting his ability to move with fluid speed in the ring, his bruised abdomen may have contributed to his losing his title to Gans only two months later.

=== Loss of the lightweight title to Gans ===
On May 12, 1902, he lost the title in his bout with Gans Gans in a stunning first-round knockout, in Ontario. Gans knocked Erne to the mat early in the fight, from a strong blow. The Evening Telegram wrote of the bout, "never did the sporting world get such a shock. Frank Erne--most clever of all fighting men--knocked out in a single punch by a man he had whipped before..." They went on to note that "Many of the spectators didn't even see the blow struck." Gans was twenty-seven, not thirty-five, for he was thirty-five when he died in 1910, because he was born in 1874, only a year before Erne.(Joe Gans by Colleen Aycock and Mark Scott.) . Erne had defended the title against New York Jack O'Brien, a talented contender on December 4, 1899. Tellingly, in the O'Brien fight, Erne had been down in both the third and ninth rounds.

On June 24, 1902, Erne defeated Jim Malone of London, England in the seventh round. The bout was billed as the 138-pound "White" World Championship. Erne had no difficult defeating Malone, and some sources noted he had not trained extensively for the bout. The fight ended when Erne landed one of his favored punches, a solid left to Malone's jaw resulting in a knockout.

== Contending for the World Welterweight Championship ==
On September 23, 1901, in Ontario, Ernie lost a shot at the World Welterweight Championship to reigning champion Rube Ferns, in a ninth-round knockout in Ontario, Canada. The Toronto Star estimated that 45,000 fans watched the fight, with the Ontario club at full capacity. In a rare display of competitiveness, Erne had fought as a contender in three separate weight divisions, winning the world title twice.

== Late boxing career and legacy ==
As a skilled strategist, Erne was not accustomed to taking much punishment in his bouts and after receiving a seventh-round knockout from a skilled, 23-year-old firebrand Jimmy Brit on November 26, 1902, at the Mechanics Pavilion in San Francisco, he considered retirement at 27. He admitted he had been "knocked completely out," by the "game young fellow," and noted "I would advise no young man to follow the ring for a living. I have quit for good and I am glad to do so."

=== Boxing in Paris ===
Despite his proclamation, Erne would continue to train intermittently, and did not retire from the ring until accepting a bout with Curley Watson in Paris for what was billed as the "Welterweight Championship of France." Showing his skills, Erne won the bout on February 29, 1908, in a ten-round points decision, but retired not long after at 33.

=== Death in New York ===
Erne died on September 17, 1954, in New York, living nearly to eighty. Perhaps his longevity could partially be attributed to his fighting a limited number of fights for a champion and nearly retiring before he reached thirty. According to the Pittsburgh Post-Gazette, Erne did not fully retire from boxing until 1908, but he may have helped with the training or management of other boxers after that date. The Gazette noted that "he never received a scar or blemish from his many fights", perhaps a result of noteworthy defensive skills. In an interview with Erne at 61, the St. Petersburg Times quoted him as saying, "I didn't fight much after 1904, and I believe this kept me from following in the footsteps of so many boxers who try to hang on after their prime. You see I was only 30 years old when I laid my gloves aside."

In 1997, he was among the first class inducted into Buffalo's Ring No. 44 Boxing Hall of Fame.

== Professional boxing record ==
53 fights	31 wins	6 losses
By knockout	15	4
By decision	15	2
By disqualification	1	0
Draws	16	

No.	Result	Record	Opponent	Type	Round	Date	Location	Notes
53	Win	31–6–16	Curly Watson	PTS	10	Feb 29, 1908	Wonderland, Paris, France	Won inaugural French welterweight title
52	Win	30–6–16	Warren Zurbrick	DQ	10 (20)	May 18, 1903	International A.C., Fort Erie, Ontario, Canada	
51	Loss	29–6–16	Jimmy Britt	KO	7 (20)	Nov 26, 1902	Mechanic's Pavilion, San Francisco, California, U.S.	Lost 'white' lightweight title
50	Win	29–5–16	Jim Maloney	KO	7 (15)	Jun 24, 1902	National Sporting Club, Covent Garden, London, England	Won vacant 'white' lightweight title
49	Loss	28–5–16	Joe Gans	KO	1 (20)	May 12, 1902	International A.C., Fort Erie, Ontario, Canada	Lost world lightweight title
48	Win	28–4–16	Gus Gardner	PTS	6	Mar 21, 1902	Wabash A.C., Chicago, Illinois, U.S.	
47	Win	27–4–16	Curley Supples	KO	6 (20)	Mar 17, 1902	International A.C., Fort Erie, Ontario, Canada	Retained world lightweight title
46	Loss	26–4–16	Rube Ferns	KO	9 (20)	Sep 23, 1901	International A.C., Fort Erie, Ontario, Canada	For world welterweight title
45	Draw	26–3–16	Tom Couhig	PTS	6	Aug 30, 1900	Olympic A.C., Buffalo, New York, U.S.	
44	Loss	26–3–15	Terry McGovern	TKO	3 (10)	Jul 16, 1900	Madison Square Garden, New York City, New York, U.S.	
43	Win	26–2–15	Joe Gans	TKO	12 (25)	Mar 23, 1900	Broadway A.C., New York City, New York, U.S.	Retained world lightweight title; Gans asked to have the bout stopped after being cut by an accidental head-butt
42	Win	25–2–15	Chicago Jack Daly	PTS	6	Feb 9, 1900	Star Theatre, Chicago, Illinois, U.S.	
41	Draw	24–2–15	New York Jack O'Brien	PTS	25	Dec 4, 1899	Coney Island A.C., Brooklyn, New York City, New York, U.S.	Retained world lightweight title
40	Win	24–2–14	George Kid Lavigne	PTS	20	Jul 3, 1899	Hawthorne A.C., Buffalo, New York, U.S.	Won world lightweight title
39	Win	23–2–14	George "Elbows" McFadden	PTS	25	May 9, 1899	Lenox A.C., New York City, New York, U.S.	
38	Win	22–2–14	Dal Hawkins	KO	7 (20)	Mar 3, 1899	Woodward's Pavilion, San Francisco, California, U.S.	
37	Draw	21–2–14	George Kid Lavigne	PTS	20	Sep 28, 1898	Greater New York A.C., Brooklyn, New York City, New York, U.S.	For world lightweight title
36	Win	21–2–13	Harry Lemons	PTS	20	Apr 25, 1898	Olympic A.C., Buffalo, New York, U.S.	
35	Draw	20–2–13	Jack Downey	PTS	20	Nov 29, 1897	Empire A.C., Buffalo, New York, U.S.	
34	Draw	20–2–12	Jim Popp	PTS	20	Oct 2, 1897	Toronto A.C., Toronto, Ontario, Canada	
33	Win	20–2–11	Larry Becker	KO	5 (20)	Sep 13, 1897	Olympic A.C., Buffalo, New York, U.S.	
32	Win	19–2–11	Joe Hopkins	TKO	19 (20)	Apr 19, 1897	Olympic A.C., Buffalo, New York, U.S.	
31	Loss	18–2–11	George Dixon	PTS	25	Mar 24, 1897	Broadway A.C., Brooklyn, New York City, New York, U.S.	Lost world featherweight title
30	Loss	18–1–11	Martin Flaherty	UD	20	Feb 20, 1897	New York A.C., New York City, New York, U.S.	
29	Win	18–0–11	George Dixon	PTS	20	Nov 27, 1896	Broadway A.C., New York City, New York, U.S.	Won world featherweight title Dixon continued to claim title
28	Draw	17–0–11	Jack Downey	PTS	12	Jun 29, 1896	South Brooklyn A.C., Brooklyn, New York City, New York, U.S.	
27	Draw	17–0–10	Jack Downey	PTS	8 (10)	May 23, 1896	Empire Theater, Brooklyn, New York City, New York, U.S.	Police stopped the bout in the eighth round and the bout was declared a draw
26	Win	17–0–9	Larry Burns	KO	5 (10)	Apr 23, 1896	Empire A.C., Buffalo, New York, U.S.	
25	Draw	16–0–9	Jack Downey	PTS	10	Mar 30, 1896	Empire A.C., Maspeth, Queens, New York City, New York, U.S.	
24	Draw	16–0–8	Young Griffo	PTS	4	Dec 20, 1895	Music Hall, Buffalo, New York, U.S.	
23	Draw	16–0–7	George Dixon	PTS	10	Dec 5, 1895	New Manhattan A.C., New York City, New York, U.S.	
22	Win	16–0–6	Jack Skelly	TKO	9 (15)	Oct 4, 1895	New Manhattan A.C., New York City, New York, U.S.	
21	Win	15–0–6	Jack Skelly	KO	7 (10)	Aug 26, 1895	Maspeth Empire AC, Maspeth, Queens, New York City, New York, U.S.	
20	Win	14–0–6	Joe Craig	TKO	3 (10)	Jul 15, 1895	Oakland Avenue Rink, Jersey City, New Jersey, U.S.	
19	Win	13–0–6	Pat Perry	PTS	4	Mar 9, 1895	London, England	
18	Win	12–0–6	Joe Leonard	KO	2 (6)	Jan 22, 1895	New Manhattan A.C., New York City, New York, U.S.	
17	Draw	11–0–6	Solly Smith	PTS	10	Oct 2, 1894	Liedertafel Hall, Buffalo, New York, U.S.	
16	Win	11–0–5	Alec Sloan	PTS	4	Aug 11, 1894	Eldorado beach, Buffalo, New York, U.S.	
15	Draw	10–0–5	George Siddons	PTS	10	Jun 16, 1894	Academy of Music, Buffalo, New York, U.S.	
14	Win	10–0–4	George Siddons	PTS	6	May 12, 1894	Court Street Theatre, Buffalo, New York, U.S.	
13	Win	9–0–4	Dan Maloney	TKO	1 (?)	May 8, 1894	Court Street Theatre, Buffalo, New York, U.S.	
12	Win	8–0–4	Pat Schultz	PTS	4	Apr 21, 1894	Court Street Theatre, Buffalo, New York, U.S.	
11	Draw	7–0–4	Tommy Dixon	PTS	4	Apr 14, 1894	Court Street Theatre, Buffalo, New York, U.S.	
10	Win	7–0–3	Hymie Goldstein	PTS	4	Apr 7, 1894	Court Street Theatre, Buffalo, New York, U.S.	
9	Win	6–0–3	Fred Warner	PTS	4	Mar 31, 1894	Court Street Theatre, Buffalo, New York, U.S.	
8	Win	5–0–3	Walter Campbell	KO	3 (4)	Mar 24, 1894	Court Street Theatre, Buffalo, New York, U.S.	
7	Draw	4–0–3	Tommy Kennedy	PTS	4	Mar 17, 1894	Court Street Theatre, Buffalo, New York, U.S.	
6	Draw	4–0–2	John L Sullivan	PTS	2 (10)	Mar 6, 1894	Music Hall, Buffalo, New York, U.S.	Not to be confused with John L. Sullivan
5	Win	4–0–1	Skip Krieger	PTS	3	Nov 27, 1893	Music Hall, Buffalo, New York, U.S.	
4	Draw	3–0–1	Joe Diebold	PTS	23	Jan 26, 1893	Buffalo A.C., Buffalo, New York, U.S.	
3	Win	3–0	John Roy	KO	4 (20)	Oct 27, 1892	Buffalo A.C., Buffalo, New York, U.S.	
2	Win	2–0	John Roy	TKO	4 (6)	Sep 29, 1892	Music Hall, Buffalo, New York, U.S.	
1	Win	1–0	James McCarthy	PTS	6	Mar 17, 1892	Star Theater, Buffalo, New York, U.S.	

== See also ==
- Lineal championship

== World titles won ==
Achievements
Preceded by George Dixon	World Featherweight Championship; November 27, 1896 - March 24, 1897	Succeeded by George Dixon
Preceded by George "Kid" Lavigne	World Lightweight Championship; July 3, 1899 - May 12, 1902	Succeeded by Joe Gans
