= Jimmy Gardner (boxer) =

Irish boxer

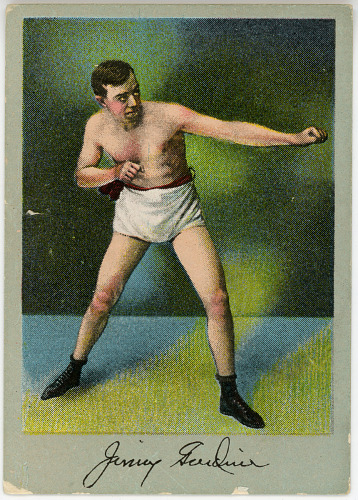
Jimmy Gardiner on a cigarette card circa. 1910

Jimmy Gardner (25 December 1885 – May 1964) was an Irish boxer in America from 1901 to 1917.

Gardner was born in 1885 in Lisdoonvarna, County Clare, Ireland. He was the brother of George Gardner, once Light Heavyweight Champion, and Billy Gardner, a boxer as well. He was known as a clever fighter, rather than a power-hitter and only lost four fights in his first eight years. Gardner recorded 61 wins, 36 by knockout, and 8 losses.

Gardner's brother-in-law, Joe Thomas, was a middleweight of the teens.
