= George "Elbows" McFadden =

American boxer (1874–1948)

George McFadden
Personal information
- Nickname: George "Elbows" McFadden
- Nationality: American
- Born: Michael James Crotty; September 16, 1874 Limerick, County Limerick, Ireland
- Died: August 30, 1948 (aged 73) Geneva, Ashtabula County, Ohio, US
- Height: 5 ft 6 in (168cm)
- Weight: Lightweight

Boxing career
- Stance: Orthodox

Boxing record
- Total fights: 99
- Wins: 46
- Win by KO: 26
- Losses: 13
- Draws: 21
- No contests: 19

George "Elbows" McFadden (born Michael James Crotty; September 16, 1874 – August 30, 1948) was a former professional lightweight boxer, active between 1894 and 1908.

== Professional boxing career ==
McFadden launched his professional boxing career in New York in 1894. His nickname "Elbows" came from his ability to defend against various strikes using his elbows.

On April 14, 1899, he secured a knockout victory over Joe Gans in the 23rd round of 25 rounder at the Broadway Athletic Club in New York. It was the first time that Gans had been knocked out. The following month in May, he fought Frank Erne at the Lenox Athletic Club, losing a 25-round decision. In an August 1899 rematch with Gans, he fought to a draw after 25 rounds. He later became the first to knock out former lightweight world champion Kid Lavigne after stopping him in the nineteenth round of a bout on October 6, 1899. Despite meeting three of the division's greatest fighters and future world champions, he never became a champion himself.

Of his 97 recorded bouts, McFadden won 45, lost 12, and drew 21, with 25 of his victories coming by way of knockout. McFadden also engaged in at least fifty other contests that were not recorded.

McFadden claimed he was never seriously injured throughout 392 fights over a 15-year span.

After he retired in 1908, McFadden opened a gymnasium on Manhattan's Madison Avenue.

== Death ==
While traveling from Buffalo to Michigan, he was struck by a trailer and suffered two broken legs and multiple fractures. He died at Geneva Community Hospital on August 30, 1948, at the age of 73, and was buried in Community Cemetery at Geneva, Ohio.

== Legacy ==
His book, Blocking And Hitting, was published by Richard Kyle Fox in 1905.

He was inducted into the Bare Knuckle Boxing Hall of Fame in 2013.
