= Harry Lewis (boxer) =

American boxer (1886–1956)

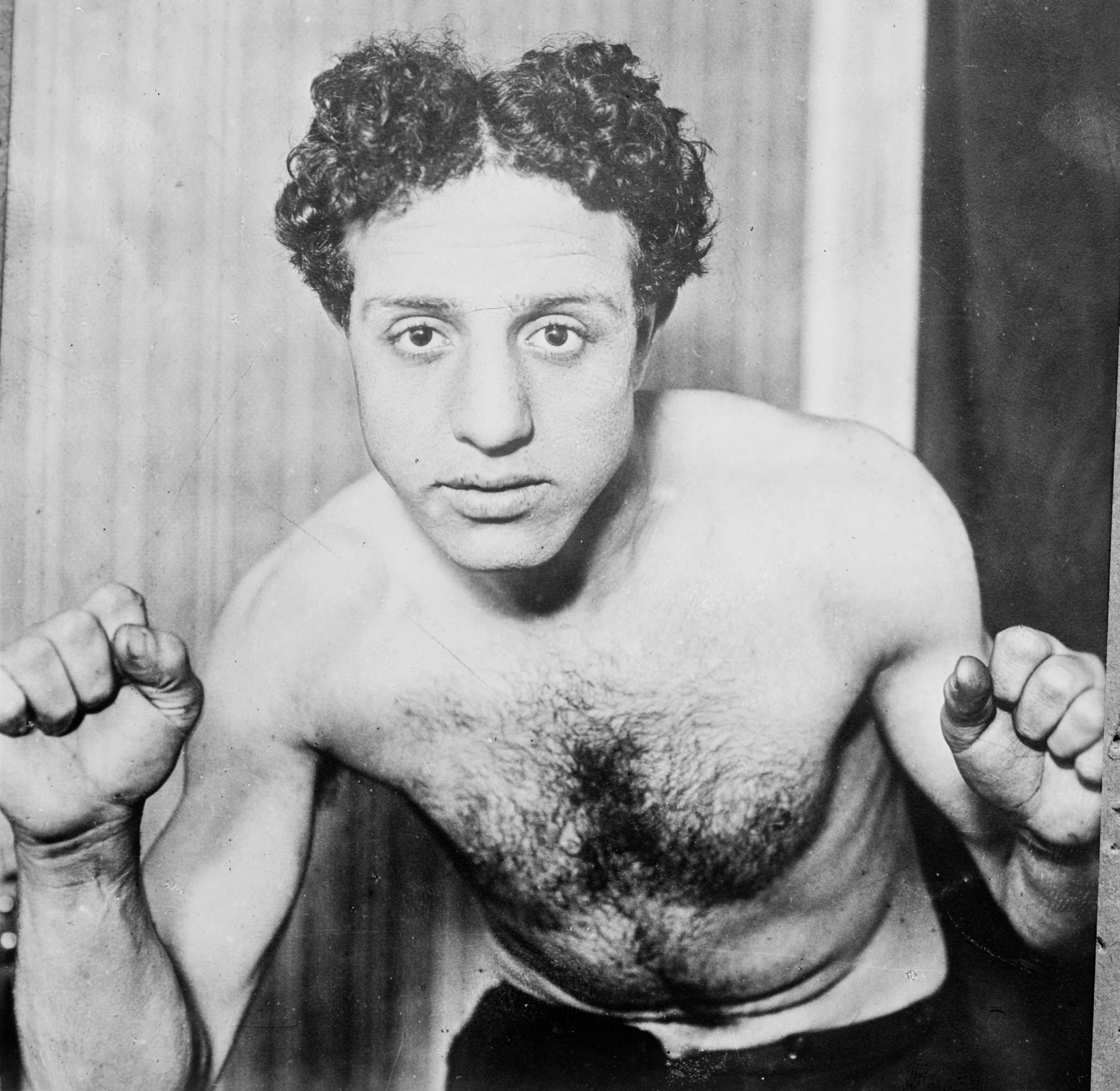

Personal information
- Nationality: American
- Born: Henry Besterman; September 16, 1886 New York, New York
- Died: February 22, 1956 (aged 69) Philadelphia, Pennsylvania
- Height: 5 ft 7 in (1.70 m)
- Weight: Welterweight

Boxing career
- Reach: 67 in (170 cm)

Boxing record
- Total fights: 172
- Wins: 107
- Win by KO: 48
- Losses: 39
- Draws: 25
- No contests: 1

Harry Lewis (Harry Besterman; September 16, 1886 – February 22, 1956), was an American boxer, generally credited with holding the Welterweight Championship of the World from April 1908 to March 1911. He defeated "Young Joseph", the reigning Welterweight Champion of England in London on June 27, 1910, but was not credited with the British Welterweight championship as the fight was sanctioned as a World, and not English title. Boxing writer Nat Fleischer rated Lewis the sixth-greatest welterweight of all time. He was inducted into the International Jewish Sports Hall of Fame in 2002, and into the International Boxing Hall of Fame in 2008.

== Early life and boxing as a feather and lightweight ==
Lewis was born Harry Besterman in New York City on September 6, 1886, and was Jewish. While he was a young child his family moved to Philadelphia. Besterman took his ring name "Lewis" from a local fight manager. In Lewis's early fighting career, his father Jake often gave advice to Harry at ringside during fights. According to Ken Blady, Lewis's father turned out to be a "thorn in the flesh of Harry's professional managers." With a strong jaw, and an impressive defensive style, Lewis was knocked out only twice in his career.

Lewis's future rival, Willie Lewis once told Ring Magazine that Harry "specialized in knocking out guys who were never knocked out before. Harry was an artist in feinting and countering. His punches only went a few inches, but boy what authority they carried." He was also known for a powerful left hook to the midsection that characterized his early and mid-career.

In 1903, at the age of seventeen, Lewis turned professional. His father Jake Besterman helped manage many of his early fights and was an ardent supporter. According to author Ken Blady, he lost only three times in his first fifty professional bouts. Proving his status as a contender, Lewis fought accomplished boxer Tommy Lowe on January 2, 1905, in a fifteen round draw in Philadelphia. He had an important 15-round bout with featherweight Kid Herman on April 28, 1905, in Baltimore which ended in a draw.

=== Classic bout with Benny Yanger ===
On May 19, 1905, in only his second year of boxing, he met Benny Yanger, an exceptional featherweight, whom he defeated in a first round TKO at the armory in Baltimore. Three doctors at ringside reported Yanger had broken his arm during the bout. Partly accounting for his legendary reputation, three years earlier in 1902, Yanger had been one of the few boxers to ever defeat Abe Attell during his early reign as featherweight champion.

=== Lewis's move to lightweight and bout with champion Joe Gans ===
Moving up from featherweight in 1905, Lewis fought leading lightweight contender Young Erne six times, losing only twice, though drawing the remainder of his fights. He fought Unk Russell twice in October and November 1905, winning decisively in two six round bouts in Philadelphia, and further demonstrating his potential as a serious contender.

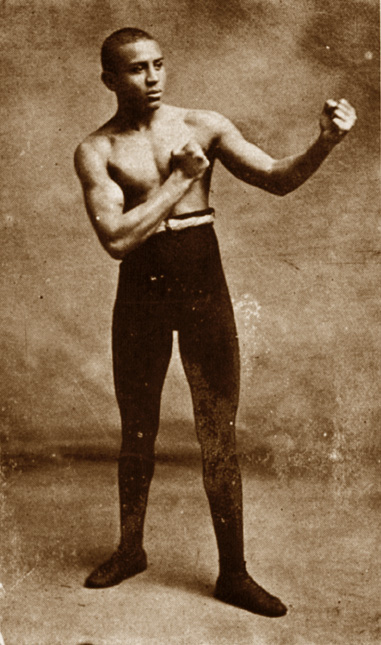
Joe Gans, World Lightweight Champion

On June 15, 1906, Lewis took on the great reigning black Lightweight World Champion Joe Gans in Philadelphia at the National Athletic Club. Both boxers connected with serious blows in different rounds, though Gans was able to knock Lewis to the mat in two rounds. Though the fight was a six round no decision, Lewis was viewed as a far more dangerous competitor having compared favorably with one of history's greatest lightweights. Newspapers split on which boxer had the edge in the fight, but the Philadelphia Item, who had reporters on the scene, called the fight a draw. The Police Gazette considered the bout the best of Lewis's career. On January 25 of that year, he fought Willie Lewis for three rounds in New York, losing in the newspaper decision of the Boston Globe. Willie Lewis would become a frequent opponent of Harry by 1908 and help to draw large crowds.

Lewis knocked out Canadian Mike Ward in Grand Rapids, Michigan on November 16, 1906. According to the Rock Island Argus, in the eighth round, Ward was knocked down for the first time and took a count of nine, but got up and continued fighting. Lewis immediately connected with a blow that sent Ward to the canvas for at least five minutes before he could regain consciousness, though he immediately slipped back into a comatose state. Ward died the next day. Lewis claimed that Ward striking the canvas when he fell was largely the cause of his death, and a post-mortem supported his conclusion. Lewis was subsequently charged with manslaughter as a result of Ward's death and was fined $1,000 for engaging in a prize fight. His father and manager Jacob Besterman was fined the same amount for aiding in a prize fight and his trainer Frank O'Brien was fined as well.

== Winning the Welterweight World Title ==
Having stood the test with the great lightweight Gans, Lewis moved up to welterweight, and defeated Rube Smith convincingly on January 22, 1907, in an eight-round knockout in Denver.

Mike Sullivan

He defeated Mike "Twin" Sullivan in Denver on February 21, 1907, in a very close match just two months before Sullivan would take the World Welterweight title from reigning champion William Mellody in Los Angeles. Lewis's fight with Sullivan was close and both boxers showed skills. A reporter for the St. John Sun partial to Sullivan's performance noted that "What punches were landed were put through by Sullivan, who fought Lewis all over the ring in every round." The reporter observed the superior punching power of Sullivan, but also paid homage to Lewis's scientific boxing skills when he observed, "Lewis seemed to change his style of fighting in every round." Lewis fought the bout at only 140, and was probably outweighed by Sullivan, who was known for his strength and strong punching ability. Though highly unpopular with the crowd, the decision against Sullivan by referee Reddy Gallagher may have been influenced by Lewis's style, speed, and defensive skills. A year later, when Lewis met world welterweight champion Honey Mellody, he added both weight and strength to his natural skills of speed and technique.

On May 6, 1907, Lewis fought accomplished light welterweight Jimmy Gardner in a six round bout, further demonstrating his status as a contender. Two weeks later on May 21, Lewis defeated Gardner in a ten round bout in Denver.

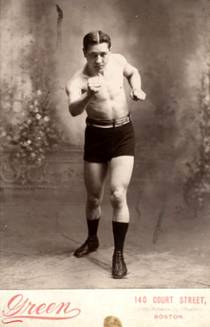
Honey Mellody, 1906 World Welterweight Champion

When Sullivan relinquished his title for being over the welterweight limit, Lewis decided to lay claim to it. On January 23, 1908, he defeated the top world championship welterweight claimant Frank Mantell at Edgewood Athletic Club in New Haven, Connecticut in a third round TKO, giving real substance to his claim to the title. At the zenith of his career, Lewis secured the Welterweight Championship of the World defeating William "Honey" Mellody, the most recent holder of the title, on April 20, 1908, at the armory in Boston in a fourth round TKO, although no single sanctioning organization was recognized worldwide at the time. The Gazette Times wrote of the fight that "Lewis scored a knockdown in the first round and in point of cleverness outclassed Mellody," in the exceptional fourth round knockout. Several other boxers vied to claim the title as it was vacant at the time, but most sources now recognize Lewis's claim.

Lewis fought accomplished Philadelphia welterweight Unk Russell twice in May in Philadelphia and then three times in July, September and October 1908, in classic fast, and aggressive bouts with Lewis winning most handily in the September bout in Boston. As a five time opponent in 1908, Lewis's bouts with Russell characterized his style in his early reign as the welterweight champion.

On December 14, 1908, Harry had a close bout with one of his frequent opponents, welterweight contender Willie Lewis at the New Haven, Connecticut, Grand Opera House. As was typical of Lewis's style of boxing, he was an expert in counter punching, rapid blows, and scientific boxing. The New London Day wrote of the fight "Harry put on a very fast exhibition of infighting in the early stages of the go but towards the end he seemed to lose out in putting his punches over with the necessary force and as a result the New York boy (Willie) was in a fair way of stopping his namesake who holds the championship." The New York Times, however, considered the twelve round bout a draw. Among the two preliminary bouts, the first was a close fight between New London native Abe Hollandersky and Maurice Lemoine of Webster, Massachusetts.

== Boxing in Europe, and relinquishing the welterweight championship ==
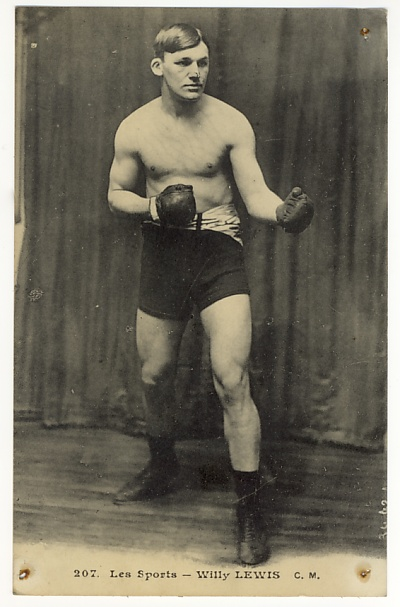
Frequent rival Willie Lewis

From early 1910 until the fall of 1913, Lewis fought overseas in France and England. Lewis and his friend Willie Lewis toured France, meeting twice to packed houses in Paris in 25 round draws. Both bouts with Willie Lewis in March and April 1910 were billed as Welterweight championships of the World.

=== Defeating the English Welterweight Champion ===
On June 27, 1910, he fought in London for the English welterweight crown, against Ansel "Young" Joseph, winning in a seventh round TKO at Wonderland in London, and knocking down Joseph nine times in the bout. The purse was set at $3000 by the National Sporting Club of London. He also defeated English welterweight champion Johnny Summers on January 25, 1911, though Summers was over the welterweight limit, and the fight was not an official title match according to some sources.

During an interlude back in America in the fall of 1910, Lewis lost to Leo Houck twice in non-title fights, once on August 23 and once on September 17, 1910, in Boston and Philadelphia, though the loss in Philadelphia was by the decision of two Philadelphia newspapers.

=== Boxing as a middleweight ===
Lewis relinquished the welterweight title in March 1911, being unable to make the welterweight limit. After this date, he fought almost exclusively as a middleweight.

On May 3, 1911, Lewis lost to Leo Houck at L'Hippodrome in Paris while Emile Maitrot acted as referee. BoxRec records this bout as the loss of the Middleweight World Championship which Lewis claimed to have taken on February 22, 1911, from Blink McClosky previously at the Hippodrome. The Middleweight World Championship had been vacated by Stanley Ketchell the previous year, and remained vacant all of 1911, though no sanctioning bodies active today recognize Lewis's claim to the title.

== Boxing decline and retirement ==
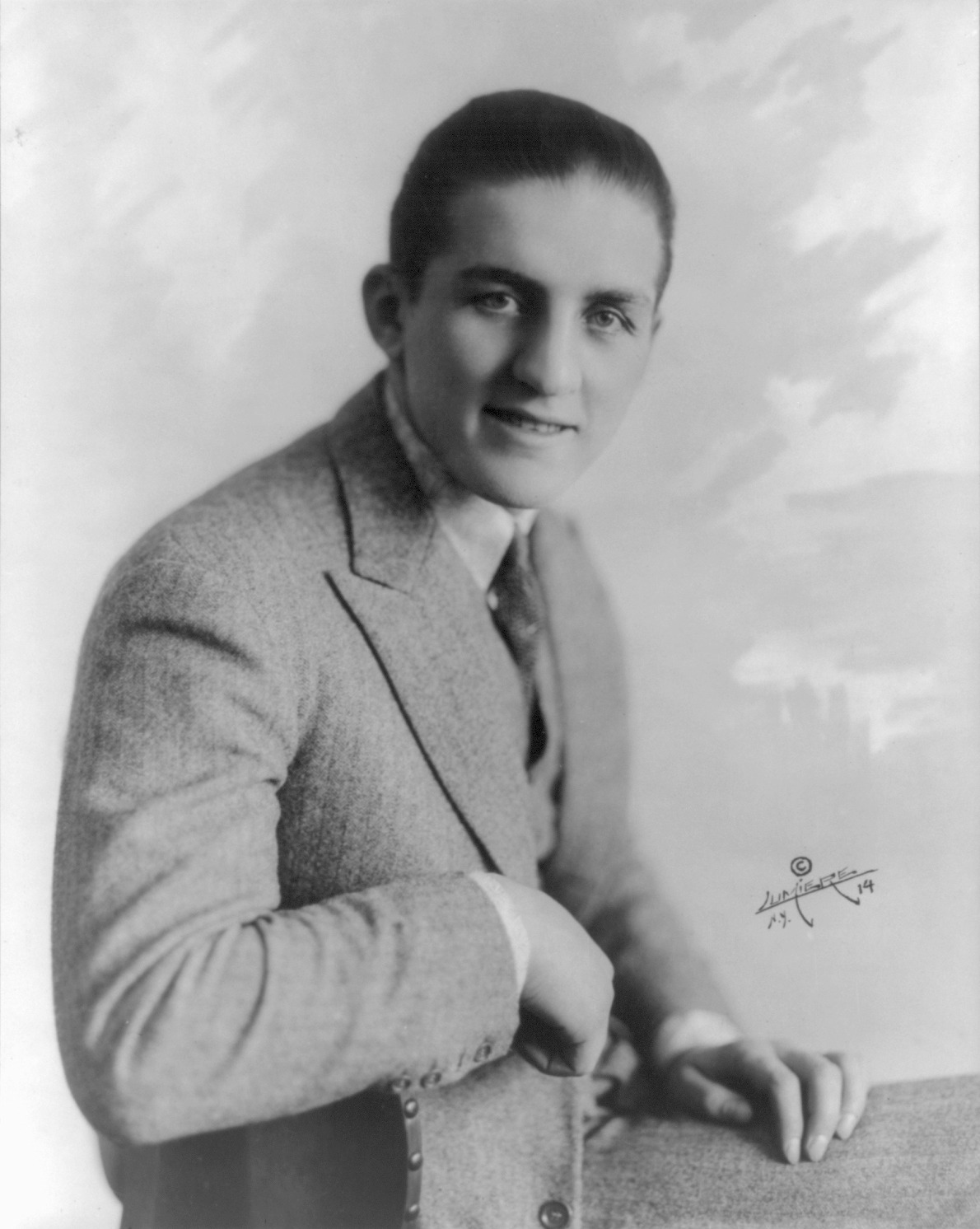
Georges Carpentier

After his loss to Houck, Lewis's boxing fortunes began to decline. On December 13, 1911, he lost to French boxing great Georges Carpentier at the Cirque de Paris in front of large enthusiastic crowds. Lewis was outweighed by Carpentier, and had at least a four-inch disadvantage in height as well. The fight demonstrates Lewis's gameness, but also the peculiar regulation of the sport during the period. In a show of old greatness, he defeated the Dixie Kid in Liverpool, England in an eighth round TKO on January 18, 1912.

Returning to Philadelphia, Lewis made a tragic mistake agreeing to box Joe Borrell on October 13, 1913, at the Olympia Athletic Club in Philadelphia. He had been in a car accident while traveling in a taxi in Philadelphia the previous spring and had suffered a head injury. During the Borrell fight, Lewis was knocked to the canvas twice and according to boxing writer Ken Blady, was "so groggy and dazed between rounds that the referee had to stop the fight." By the fifth round he was unable to resume the bout after being knocked to the canvas. Taken to Philadelphia Hospital, he was subsequently diagnosed with a blood clot in his brain. Lewis suffered from partial paralysis the remainder of his life.

After recovering, he managed a number of boxers in his retirement, including Bernie Manhoff. Lewis died on February 22, 1956, in Philadelphia at the age of 69.

== Titles won ==
Following are the dates in which Lewis is most frequently cited for holding the World Welterweight title. Several sources state he relinquished the title in March 1911 because he was above the Welterweight limit. Several boxers claimed the American title after Lewis relinquished it with no universally recognized successor until Ted "Kid" Lewis in 1915.

Some sources state Harry Lewis won the British welterweight title when he defeated Young Joseph in London on June 27, 1910, however according to BoxRec, the British Boxing Board of Control (BBBofC) believed the title Lewis fought for against Young Joseph was the World not the British Welterweight Title, and so Young Joseph retained the British Title when he lost to Lewis.

Lewis claimed he held the World Middleweight Title between February 22, 1911, when he defeated Blink McCloskey at the Hippodrome in Paris, and May 3, 1911, when he lost to middleweight contender Leo Houck at the same location. The title was vacant at the time due to the death of Stanley Ketchel who had previously held it. No sanctioning bodies today recognize his claim during that period, but it is listed in the table below.

Achievements
Preceded by Mike "Twin" Sullivan, vacant 1908	World Welterweight Championship; April 20, 1908 – rel. March, 1911	Succeeded by Vacant; Jack Britton
Preceded by Vacated by Stanley Ketchell	World Middleweight Championship; Unrecognized; February 22, 1911 – May 3, 1911	Succeeded by Vacant all of 1911; Frank Klaus, March 15, 1913

== Professional boxing record ==
All information in this section is derived from BoxRec, unless otherwise stated.

=== Official record ===
172 fights	60 wins	17 losses
By knockout	47	2
By decision	12	12
By disqualification	1	3
Draws	6	
No contests	1	
Newspaper decisions/draws	88	

All newspaper decisions are officially regarded as “no decision” bouts and are not counted in the win/loss/draw column.

No.	Result	Record	Opponent	Type	Round, time	Date	Age	Location	Notes
172	Loss	60–17–6 (89)	Joe Borrell	TKO	5 (6)	Oct 13, 1912	26 years, 27 days	Olympia A.C., Philadelphia, Pennsylvania, U.S.	
171	Win	60–16–6 (89)	Private Jack Harrison	TKO	3 (20)	Mar 17, 1912	25 years, 183 days	National Sporting Club, Covent Garden, England	
170	Win	59–16–6 (89)	Jerry Thompson	KO	14 (20)	Jan 30, 1912	25 years, 136 days	Liverpool Stadium, Pudsey Street, Liverpool, England	
169	Win	58–16–6 (89)	Johnny Mathieson	TKO	3 (?)	Dec 26, 1912	26 years, 101 days	Liverpool Stadium, Pudsey Street, Liverpool, England	
168	Loss	57–16–6 (89)	Johnny Mathieson	PTS	20	Jun 10, 1912	25 years, 268 days	Sparbrook Skating Rink, Birmingham, England	
167	Loss	57–15–6 (89)	Private Palmer	PTS	20	May 13, 1912	25 years, 240 days	Boulevard Rink, Leicester, England	
166	Win	57–14–6 (89)	Seaman Brown	KO	2 (20)	Apr 29, 1912	25 years, 226 days	Empire Skating Rink, Sparbrook, England	
165	Win	56–14–6 (89)	Harry Mansfield	PTS	20	Mar 28, 1912	25 years, 194 days	Liverpool Stadium, Pudsey Street, Liverpool, England	
164	Win	55–14–6 (89)	Dixie Kid	TKO	8 (20)	Jan 18, 1912	25 years, 124 days	Liverpool Stadium, Pudsey Street, Liverpool, England	
163	Loss	54–14–6 (89)	Georges Carpentier	PTS	20	Dec 13, 1911	25 years, 88 days	Cirque de Paris, Paris, France	
162	Draw	54–13–6 (89)	George K.O. Brown	PTS	8	Oct 9, 1911	25 years, 23 days	Southern A.C., Memphis, Tennessee, U.S.	
161	Loss	54–13–5 (89)	George Gunther	PTS	20	May 27, 1911	24 years, 253 days	Wonderland, Paris, France	
160	Loss	54–12–5 (89)	Leo Houck	PTS	20	May 3, 1911	24 years, 229 days	L'Hippodrome, Clichy, France	Lost world middleweight title claim
159	Win	54–11–5 (89)	Arthur Harman	KO	2 (15)	Mar 13, 1911	24 years, 178 days	The Ring, Blackfriars Road, Southwark, England	
158	Win	53–11–5 (89)	Charlie Duncan	KO	3 (20)	Mar 1, 1911	24 years, 166 days	Cercle de la Méditerranée, Nice, France	
157	Win	52–11–5 (89)	Blink McCloskey	PTS	25	Feb 22, 1911	24 years, 159 days	Hippodrome, Paris, France	Claimed vacant world middleweight title
156	Win	51–11–5 (89)	Stoker Hulls	KO	5 (?)	Feb 18, 1911	24 years, 155 days	Plymouth, England	
155	Win	50–11–5 (89)	Private Jim Harris	TKO	5 (20)	Feb 13, 1911	24 years, 150 days	The Empire, Holborn, England	
154	Win	49–11–5 (89)	Blink McCloskey	TKO	3 (15)	Feb 1, 1911	24 years, 138 days	Salle Wagram, Paris, France	
153	Win	48–11–5 (89)	Johnny Summers	KO	4 (20)	Jan 25, 1911	24 years, 131 days	Olympia Annexe, Kensington, England	
152	Win	47–11–5 (89)	Geoff Thorne	KO	1 (15)	Dec 14, 1910	24 years, 89 days	Salle Wagram, Paris, France	
151	Win	46–11–5 (89)	Dick Nelson	KO	2 (10)	Nov 7, 1910	24 years, 52 days	American A.C., Schenectady, New York, U.S.	
150	Draw	45–11–5 (89)	Young Loughrey	NWS	6	Oct 28, 1910	24 years, 42 days	Nonpareil A.C., Philadelphia, Pennsylvania, U.S.	
149	Win	45–11–5 (88)	Billy Glover	TKO	5 (10)	Oct 21, 1910	24 years, 35 days	Brown's Gym, New York City, New York, U.S.	
148	Loss	44–11–5 (88)	Leo Houck	NWS	6	Sep 17, 1910	24 years, 1 day	National A.C., Philadelphia, Pennsylvania, U.S.	
147	Draw	44–11–5 (87)	Harry Mansfield	NWS	10	Sep 2, 1910	23 years, 351 days	National S.C., New York City, New York, U.S.	
146	Loss	44–11–5 (86)	Leo Houck	PTS	12	Aug 23, 1910	23 years, 341 days	Armory, Boston, Massachusetts, U.S.	
145	Win	44–10–5 (86)	Young Joseph	TKO	7 (20)	Jun 27, 1910	23 years, 284 days	Wonderland, Whitechapel Road, Whitechapel, England	Retained world welterweight title
144	Win	43–10–5 (86)	Sam Harris	KO	2 (?)	Jun 11, 1910	23 years, 268 days	Salle Wagram, Paris, France	
143	Win	42–10–5 (86)	Bill Davies	KO	1 (10)	May 18, 1910	23 years, 244 days	Salle Wagram, Paris, France	Third of 3 bouts Lewis had on the same day
142	Win	41–10–5 (86)	Bert Ropert	KO	2 (10)	May 18, 1910	23 years, 244 days	Salle Wagram, Paris, France	Second of 3 bouts Lewis had on the same day
141	Win	40–10–5 (86)	Bob Scanlon	DQ	2 (10)	May 18, 1910	23 years, 244 days	Salle Wagram, Paris, France	First of 3 bouts Lewis had on the same day
140	Win	39–10–5 (86)	Peter Brown	KO	3 (20)	May 4, 1910	23 years, 230 days	Salle Wagram, Paris, France	Retained world welterweight title
139	Draw	38–10–5 (86)	Willie Lewis	PTS	25	Apr 23, 1910	23 years, 219 days	Cirque de Paris, Paris, France	Retained world welterweight title
138	Loss	38–10–4 (86)	Charley Hitte	DQ	4 (20)	Mar 12, 1910	23 years, 177 days	Wonderland, Paris, France	Lewis DQ'd for low blow
137	Draw	38–9–4 (86)	Willie Lewis	PTS	25	Feb 19, 1910	23 years, 156 days	Cirque de Paris, Paris, France	Retained world welterweight title
136	Win	38–9–3 (86)	Howard Baker	PTS	10	Jan 11, 1910	23 years, 117 days	Denver A.C., Denver, Colorado, U.S.	
135	Draw	37–9–3 (86)	Frank Klaus	NWS	6	Nov 27, 1909	23 years, 72 days	National A.C., Philadelphia, Pennsylvania, U.S.	
134	Win	37–9–3 (85)	Dan Sullivan	KO	1 (12)	Oct 19, 1909	23 years, 33 days	Armory, Boston, Massachusetts, U.S.	
133	Win	36–9–3 (85)	Eddie Chambers	TKO	1 (6)	Oct 13, 1909	23 years, 27 days	Wayne A.C., Philadelphia, Pennsylvania, U.S.	
132	Win	35–9–3 (85)	Harry Mansfield	NWS	6	Oct 6, 1909	23 years, 20 days	Philadelphia A.C., Philadelphia, Pennsylvania, U.S.	
131	Loss	35–9–3 (84)	Harry Mansfield	NWS	10	Sep 3, 1909	22 years, 352 days	Williamsport A.C., Williamsport, Pennsylvania, U.S.	
130	Win	35–9–3 (83)	Tommy Crawford	KO	2 (?)	Jul 26, 1909	22 years, 313 days	Williamsport, Pennsylvania, U.S.	
129	Win	34–9–3 (83)	Harry Mansfield	NWS	6	Jun 24, 1909	22 years, 281 days	Broadway A.C., Philadelphia, Pennsylvania, U.S.	
128	Loss	34–9–3 (82)	Frank Klaus	DQ	6 (6)	Apr 24, 1909	22 years, 220 days	Nonpareil A.C., Philadelphia, Pennsylvania, U.S.	
127	Win	34–8–3 (82)	Terry Martin	NWS	6	Mar 26, 1909	22 years, 191 days	Nonpareil A.C., Philadelphia, Pennsylvania, U.S.	
126	Win	34–8–3 (81)	George Krall	KO	1 (3)	Mar 18, 1909	22 years, 183 days	Broadway A.C., Philadelphia, Pennsylvania, U.S.	Second of 2 bouts for Lewis on the same day
125	Win	33–8–3 (81)	Johnny Dugan	TKO	2 (3)	Mar 18, 1909	22 years, 183 days	Broadway A.C., Philadelphia, Pennsylvania, U.S.	First of 2 bouts for Lewis on the same day
124	Loss	32–8–3 (81)	Tommy Sullivan	NWS	6	Mar 6, 1909	22 years, 171 days	National A.C., Philadelphia, Pennsylvania, U.S.	
123	Loss	32–8–3 (80)	Bill MacKinnon	PTS	12	Feb 2, 1909	22 years, 139 days	Armory A.A., Boston, Massachusetts, U.S.	
122	Win	32–7–3 (80)	Harry Mansfield	NWS	6	Jan 5, 1909	22 years, 111 days	Douglas A.C., Philadelphia, Pennsylvania, U.S.	
121	Loss	32–7–3 (79)	Willie Lewis	NWS	12	Dec 14, 1908	22 years, 89 days	Grand Opera House, New Haven, Connecticut, U.S.	
120	Draw	32–7–3 (78)	Unk Russell	NWS	6	Oct 1, 1908	22 years, 15 days	Old City Hall, Pittsburgh, Pennsylvania, U.S.	
119	Win	32–7–3 (77)	Terry Martin	TKO	5 (6)	Sep 25, 1908	22 years, 9 days	National S.C., New York City, New York, U.S.	
118	Win	31–7–3 (77)	Unk Russell	PTS	12	Sep 7, 1908	21 years, 357 days	Armory A.A., Boston, Massachusetts, U.S.	
117	Win	30–7–3 (77)	Unk Russell	NWS	6	Jul 14, 1908	21 years, 302 days	Auditorium, Bangor, Maine, U.S.	
116	Win	30–7–3 (76)	Jim Donovan	PTS	6	Jun 29, 1908	21 years, 287 days	Bangor, Maine, U.S.	
115	Win	29–7–3 (76)	Larry Temple	PTS	12	Jun 23, 1908	21 years, 281 days	Armory A.A., Boston, Massachusetts, U.S.	
114	Loss	28–7–3 (76)	Willie Lewis	NWS	6	Jun 9, 1908	21 years, 267 days	National S.C., New York City, New York, U.S.	
113	Win	28–7–3 (75)	Unk Russell	NWS	6	May 23, 1908	21 years, 250 days	National A.C., Philadelphia, Pennsylvania, U.S.	
112	Win	28–7–3 (74)	Charley Hitte	NWS	6	May 19, 1908	21 years, 246 days	National S.C., New York City, New York, U.S.	
111	Win	28–7–3 (73)	Unk Russell	NWS	6	May 9, 1908	21 years, 236 days	National A.C., Philadelphia, Pennsylvania, U.S.	
110	Win	28–7–3 (72)	Larry Conley	KO	3 (?)	Apr 27, 1908	21 years, 224 days	Augusta, Maine, U.S.	
109	Win	27–7–3 (72)	William 'Honey' Mellody	KO	4 (12), 2:30	Apr 20, 1908	21 years, 217 days	Armory, Boston, Massachusetts, U.S.	Retained world welterweight title claim
108	Win	26–7–3 (72)	Terry Martin	PTS	15	Mar 26, 1908	21 years, 192 days	Eureka Athletic Club, Baltimore, Maryland, U.S.	Retained world welterweight title claim
107	Loss	25–7–3 (72)	Terry Martin	NWS	6	Feb 15, 1908	21 years, 152 days	National A.C., Philadelphia, Pennsylvania, U.S.	
106	Win	25–7–3 (71)	Frank Mantell	TKO	3 (12)	Jan 23, 1908	21 years, 129 days	Edgewood A.C., New Haven, Connecticut, U.S.	Claimed world welterweight title
105	Win	24–7–3 (71)	Pat O'Keefe	PTS	12	Dec 23, 1907	21 years, 98 days	Winnisimmet A.C., Chelsea, Massachusetts, U.S.	
104	Loss	23–7–3 (71)	Terry Martin	NWS	6	Dec 16, 1907	21 years, 91 days	Spring Garden A.C., Philadelphia, Pennsylvania, U.S.	
103	Loss	23–7–3 (70)	Jack Blackburn	NWS	6	Nov 20, 1907	21 years, 65 days	National A.C., Philadelphia, Pennsylvania, U.S.	
102	Win	23–7–3 (69)	Mike Donovan	NWS	6	Nov 1, 1907	21 years, 46 days	Industrial Hall, Philadelphia, Pennsylvania, U.S.	
101	Win	23–7–3 (68)	Cub White	NWS	6	Oct 17, 1907	21 years, 31 days	Broadway A.C., Philadelphia, Pennsylvania, U.S.	
100	Win	23–7–3 (67)	Cub White	NWS	3	Oct 3, 1907	21 years, 17 days	Broadway A.C., Philadelphia, Pennsylvania, U.S.	Second of 2 bouts for Lewis on the same day
99	Win	23–7–3 (66)	Kid Stein	NWS	3	Oct 3, 1907	21 years, 17 days	Broadway A.C., Philadelphia, Pennsylvania, U.S.	First of 2 bouts for Lewis on the same day
98	Win	23–7–3 (65)	Kid Locke	NWS	3	Aug 8, 1907	20 years, 326 days	Broadway A.C., Philadelphia, Pennsylvania, U.S.	Second of 2 bouts for Lewis on the same day
97	Win	23–7–3 (64)	Boxer Kelly	NWS	3	Aug 8, 1907	20 years, 326 days	Broadway A.C., Philadelphia, Pennsylvania, U.S.	First of 2 bouts for Lewis on the same day
96	Win	23–7–3 (63)	Kid Locke	NWS	3	Jul 25, 1907	20 years, 312 days	Broadway A.C., Philadelphia, Pennsylvania, U.S.	Second of 2 bouts for Lewis on the same day
95	Win	23–7–3 (62)	Boxer Kelly	NWS	3	Jul 25, 1907	20 years, 312 days	Broadway A.C., Philadelphia, Pennsylvania, U.S.	First of 2 bouts for Lewis on the same day
94	Win	23–7–3 (61)	Jack Goldswain	TKO	5 (6)	Jul 16, 1907	20 years, 303 days	National A.C., Philadelphia, Pennsylvania, U.S.	
93	Win	22–7–3 (61)	Billy Griffith	KO	2 (?)	Jul 1, 1907	20 years, 288 days	National S.C., New York City, New York, U.S.	
92	Win	21–7–3 (61)	Dave Deshler	TKO	2 (6)	Jun 22, 1907	20 years, 279 days	National A.C., Philadelphia, Pennsylvania, U.S.	
91	Win	20–7–3 (61)	Billy Griffith	NWS	6	Jun 20, 1907	20 years, 277 days	Broadway A.C., Philadelphia, Pennsylvania, U.S.	
90	Win	20–7–3 (60)	Jack Roller	KO	4 (6)	Jun 13, 1907	20 years, 270 days	Broadway A.C., Philadelphia, Pennsylvania, U.S.	
89	Win	19–7–3 (60)	Tommy Sullivan	NWS	6	Jun 8, 1907	20 years, 265 days	National A.C., Philadelphia, Pennsylvania, U.S.	
88	Loss	19–7–3 (59)	Jimmy Gardner	PTS	10	May 21, 1907	20 years, 247 days	Coliseum A.C., Denver, Colorado, U.S.	
87	Win	19–6–3 (59)	Jimmy Perry	TKO	6 (?)	Feb 28, 1907	20 years, 165 days	Pueblo, Colorado, U.S.	
86	Win	18–6–3 (59)	Mike 'Twin' Sullivan	PTS	10	Feb 21, 1907	20 years, 158 days	Denver, Colorado, U.S.	
85	Win	17–6–3 (59)	Rube Smith	KO	8 (?)	Jan 22, 1907	20 years, 128 days	Denver, Colorado, U.S.	
84	Win	16–6–3 (59)	Mike Ward	KO	9 (?)	Nov 15, 1906	20 years, 60 days	Grand Rapids, Michigan, U.S.	Ward died of injuries sustained from the fight.
83	Draw	15–6–3 (59)	Willie Fitzgerald	NWS	6	Nov 3, 1906	20 years, 48 days	National A.C., Philadelphia, Pennsylvania, U.S.	
82	Win	15–6–3 (58)	Jack Dougherty	PTS	10	Oct 19, 1906	20 years, 33 days	Milwaukee Boxing Club, Milwaukee, Wisconsin, U.S.	
81	Win	14–6–3 (58)	Willie Fitzgerald	KO	2 (6)	Oct 13, 1906	20 years, 27 days	National A.C., Philadelphia, Pennsylvania, U.S.	
80	Loss	13–6–3 (58)	Joe Thomas	NWS	6	Sep 29, 1906	20 years, 13 days	National A.C., Philadelphia, Pennsylvania, U.S.	
79	Win	13–6–3 (57)	Kid Herrick	KO	3 (?)	Sep 13, 1906	19 years, 362 days	Grand Rapids, Michigan, U.S.	
78	Win	12–6–3 (57)	Jimmy Briggs	PTS	15	Sep 3, 1906	19 years, 352 days	Saginaw, Michigan, U.S.	
77	Loss	11–6–3 (57)	Maurice Sayers	DQ	6 (?)	Aug 9, 1906	19 years, 327 days	Grand Rapids, Michigan, U.S.	
76	Win	11–5–3 (57)	Jimmy Briggs	PTS	10	Jul 12, 1906	19 years, 299 days	Powers' Opera House, Grand Rapids, Michigan, U.S.	
75	Win	10–5–3 (57)	Tom Prendergast	TKO	4 (10)	Jun 28, 1906	19 years, 285 days	Powers' Opera House, Grand Rapids, Michigan, U.S.	
74	Draw	9–5–3 (57)	Joe Gans	NWS	6	Jun 15, 1906	19 years, 272 days	National A.C., Philadelphia, Pennsylvania, U.S.	
73	Loss	9–5–3 (56)	Willie Fitzgerald	NWS	6	May 12, 1906	19 years, 238 days	National A.C., Philadelphia, Pennsylvania, U.S.	
72	Loss	9–5–3 (55)	Willie Fitzgerald	NWS	6	Mar 31, 1906	19 years, 196 days	National A.C., Philadelphia, Pennsylvania, U.S.	
71	Loss	9–5–3 (54)	Jimmy Gardner	NWS	6	Mar 10, 1906	19 years, 175 days	National A.C., Philadelphia, Pennsylvania, U.S.	
70	Win	9–5–3 (53)	Adam Ryan	NWS	6	Feb 24, 1906	19 years, 161 days	National A.C., Philadelphia, Pennsylvania, U.S.	
69	Win	9–5–3 (52)	Jimmy Gardner	NWS	6	Feb 10, 1906	19 years, 147 days	National A.C., Philadelphia, Pennsylvania, U.S.	
68	Win	9–5–3 (51)	Ambrose McGarry	NWS	3	Feb 1, 1906	19 years, 138 days	New York City, New York, U.S.	
67	Loss	9–5–3 (50)	Willie Lewis	NWS	3	Jan 25, 1906	19 years, 131 days	Marlborough A.C., New York City, New York, U.S.	
66	Win	9–5–3 (49)	Harry Edels	NWS	6	Jan 13, 1906	19 years, 119 days	National A.C., Philadelphia, Pennsylvania, U.S.	
65	Win	9–5–3 (48)	Maurice Sayers	NWS	6	Dec 25, 1905	19 years, 100 days	National A.C., Philadelphia, Pennsylvania, U.S.	
64	Draw	9–5–3 (47)	Tommy Connolly	NWS	10	Dec 5, 1905	19 years, 80 days	Eureka Athletic Club, Reading, Pennsylvania, U.S.	
63	Win	9–5–3 (46)	Arthur Cote	NWS	6	Dec 4, 1905	19 years, 79 days	Washington S.C., Philadelphia, Pennsylvania, U.S.	
62	Win	9–5–3 (45)	Kid Stein	NWS	6	Nov 16, 1905	19 years, 61 days	Broadway A.C., Philadelphia, Pennsylvania, U.S.	
61	Win	9–5–3 (44)	Unk Russell	NWS	6	Nov 9, 1905	19 years, 54 days	Broadway A.C., Philadelphia, Pennsylvania, U.S.	
60	Win	9–5–3 (43)	Young Donahue	NWS	6	Oct 30, 1905	19 years, 44 days	Washington S.C., Philadelphia, Pennsylvania, U.S.	
59	Win	9–5–3 (42)	Unk Russell	NWS	6	Oct 21, 1905	19 years, 35 days	National A.C., Philadelphia, Pennsylvania, U.S.	
58	Win	9–5–3 (41)	Jack Dorman	TKO	4 (?)	Sep 28, 1905	19 years, 12 days	Douglas Club, Chelsea, Massachusetts, U.S.	
57	Loss	8–5–3 (41)	Kid Sullivan	PTS	15	Sep 22, 1905	19 years, 6 days	Eureka A.C., Baltimore, Maryland, U.S.	
56	Loss	8–4–3 (41)	Young Erne	NWS	6	Sep 7, 1905	18 years, 356 days	Broadway A.C., Philadelphia, Pennsylvania, U.S.	
55	Loss	8–4–3 (40)	Sammy Smith	NWS	6	Aug 28, 1905	18 years, 346 days	National A.C., Philadelphia, Pennsylvania, U.S.	
54	Win	8–4–3 (39)	Kid Locke	NWS	6	Aug 24, 1905	18 years, 342 days	Broadway A.C., Philadelphia, Pennsylvania, U.S.	
53	Win	8–4–3 (38)	Young Donahue	NWS	6	Aug 21, 1905	18 years, 339 days	National A.C., Philadelphia, Pennsylvania, U.S.	
52	Loss	8–4–3 (37)	Young Erne	PTS	15	Aug 7, 1905	18 years, 325 days	Leiperville, Pennsylvania, U.S.	
51	Loss	8–3–3 (37)	Abraham Kid Goodman	PTS	15	Jul 8, 1905	18 years, 295 days	Chelsea, Massachusetts, U.S.	
50	Loss	8–2–3 (37)	Young Erne	PTS	10	Jun 20, 1905	18 years, 277 days	Leiperville, Pennsylvania, U.S.	
49	Draw	8–1–3 (37)	Willie Fitzgerald	NWS	6	Jun 3, 1905	18 years, 260 days	National A.C., Philadelphia, Pennsylvania, U.S.	
48	Win	8–1–3 (36)	Young Erne	NWS	6	May 27, 1905	18 years, 253 days	National A.C., Philadelphia, Pennsylvania, U.S.	
47	Win	8–1–3 (35)	Benny Yanger	TKO	1 (15)	May 19, 1905	18 years, 245 days	4th Regiment Armory, Baltimore, Maryland, U.S.	
46	Draw	7–1–3 (35)	Aurelio Herrera	NWS	6	May 6, 1905	18 years, 232 days	National A.C., Philadelphia, Pennsylvania, U.S.	
45	Draw	7–1–3 (34)	Kid Herman	PTS	15	Apr 28, 1905	18 years, 224 days	Baltimore, Maryland, U.S.	
44	Loss	7–1–2 (34)	Maurice Thompson	NWS	6	Mar 25, 1905	18 years, 190 days	National A.C., Philadelphia, Pennsylvania, U.S.	
43	Win	7–1–2 (33)	Tommy Love	NWS	6	Mar 17, 1905	18 years, 182 days	Southwark A.C., Philadelphia, Pennsylvania, U.S.	
42	Win	7–1–2 (32)	Kid Sullivan	NWS	6	Mar 13, 1905	18 years, 178 days	Washington S.C., Philadelphia, Pennsylvania, U.S.	
41	Draw	7–1–2 (31)	Jim Bonner	PTS	15	Feb 22, 1905	18 years, 159 days	Hummel's Hall, Pottsville, Pennsylvania, U.S.	
40	Win	7–1–1 (31)	Tony Moran	NWS	6	Feb 17, 1905	18 years, 154 days	Kensington A.C., Philadelphia, Pennsylvania, U.S.	
39	Win	7–1–1 (30)	Tim Callahan	NWS	6	Feb 13, 1905	18 years, 150 days	Washington S.C., Philadelphia, Pennsylvania, U.S.	
38	Win	7–1–1 (29)	George Decker	NWS	6	Jan 31, 1905	18 years, 137 days	Manhattan A.C., Philadelphia, Pennsylvania, U.S.	
37	Loss	7–1–1 (28)	Eddie Hanlon	NWS	6	Jan 24, 1905	18 years, 130 days	Manhattan A.C., Philadelphia, Pennsylvania, U.S.	
36	Win	7–1–1 (27)	Jack Cardiff	NWS	6	Jan 7, 1905	18 years, 113 days	National A.C., Philadelphia, Pennsylvania, U.S.	
35	Draw	7–1–1 (26)	Tommy Lowe	PTS	15	Jan 2, 1905	18 years, 108 days	Amphitheater, Glen Echo, Maryland, U.S.	
34	Loss	7–1 (26)	Buffalo Sunflower	NWS	6	Dec 14, 1904	18 years, 89 days	National A.C., Philadelphia, Pennsylvania, U.S.	
33	Win	7–1 (25)	Johnny Dohan	NWS	6	Dec 10, 1904	18 years, 85 days	National A.C., Philadelphia, Pennsylvania, U.S.	
32	Draw	7–1 (24)	Chester Goodwin	NWS	6	Nov 26, 1904	18 years, 71 days	National A.C., Philadelphia, Pennsylvania, U.S.	
31	Win	7–1 (23)	Jack Durane	NWS	6	Nov 23, 1904	18 years, 68 days	National A.C., Philadelphia, Pennsylvania, U.S.	
30	Draw	7–1 (22)	Kid Locke	NWS	10	Nov 21, 1904	18 years, 66 days	Reading, Pennsylvania, U.S.	
29	Win	7–1 (21)	Jim Bonner	NWS	6	Nov 19, 1904	18 years, 64 days	National A.C., Philadelphia, Pennsylvania, U.S.	
28	Win	7–1 (20)	Eddie Cody	TKO	6 (6)	Nov 18, 1904	18 years, 63 days	Manhattan A.C., Philadelphia, Pennsylvania, U.S.	
27	Win	6–1 (20)	George Walker	NWS	6	Nov 9, 1904	18 years, 54 days	National A.C., Philadelphia, Pennsylvania, U.S.	
26	Win	6–1 (19)	Kid Tyler	TKO	1 (6)	Nov 5, 1904	18 years, 50 days	National A.C., Philadelphia, Pennsylvania, U.S.	
25	Win	5–1 (19)	Joe Jackson	NWS	6	Nov 4, 1904	18 years, 49 days	Manhattan A.C., Philadelphia, Pennsylvania, U.S.	
24	Loss	5–1 (18)	Johnny Allen	NWS	6	Oct 29, 1904	18 years, 43 days	National A.C., Philadelphia, Pennsylvania, U.S.	
23	Win	5–1 (17)	Ben Maloney	KO	4 (6)	Oct 17, 1904	18 years, 31 days	Broadway A.C., Chester, Pennsylvania, U.S.	
22	Win	4–1 (17)	Mexican Jim Lee	KO	4 (6)	Oct 10, 1904	18 years, 24 days	Broadway A.C., Chester, Pennsylvania, U.S.	
21	Draw	3–1 (17)	Kid Tyler	NWS	6	Oct 3, 1904	18 years, 17 days	Broadway A.C., Chester, Pennsylvania, U.S.	
20	Draw	3–1 (16)	Young George Mack	NWS	6	Sep 26, 1904	18 years, 10 days	Broadway A.C., Chester, Pennsylvania, U.S.	
19	NC	3–1 (15)	Griff Jones	NC	2 (6)	Sep 9, 1904	17 years, 359 days	Manhattan A.C., Philadelphia, Pennsylvania, U.S.	
18	Win	3–1 (14)	Jimmy Devine	NWS	6	Sep 8, 1904	17 years, 358 days	Broadway A.C., Philadelphia, Pennsylvania, U.S.	
17	Draw	3–1 (13)	Young George Mack	NWS	6	Sep 5, 1904	17 years, 355 days	National Hall, Chester, Pennsylvania, U.S.	
16	Loss	3–1 (12)	Griff Jones	NWS	6	Jul 7, 1904	17 years, 295 days	Broadway A.C., Philadelphia, Pennsylvania, U.S.	
15	Loss	3–1 (11)	Young George Mack	NWS	6	Jun 27, 1904	17 years, 285 days	Broadway A.C., Chester, Pennsylvania, U.S.	
14	Loss	3–1 (10)	Kid Locke	NWS	6	Jun 23, 1904	17 years, 281 days	Broadway A.C., Philadelphia, Pennsylvania, U.S.	
13	Draw	3–1 (9)	Mexican Jim Lee	NWS	6	May 16, 1904	17 years, 243 days	Broadway A.C., Chester, Pennsylvania, U.S.	
12	Win	3–1 (8)	Kid Allen	NWS	6	May 9, 1904	17 years, 236 days	Broadway A.C., Chester, Pennsylvania, U.S.	
11	Draw	3–1 (7)	Kid Allen	NWS	6	May 6, 1904	17 years, 233 days	Frankford A.C., Philadelphia, Pennsylvania, U.S.	
10	Win	3–1 (6)	Jim Kohler	KO	1 (6)	Apr 15, 1904	17 years, 212 days	Southern A.C., Philadelphia, Pennsylvania, U.S.	
9	Draw	2–1 (6)	Mexican Jim Lee	NWS	6	Feb 8, 1904	17 years, 145 days	Broadway A.C., Chester, Pennsylvania, U.S.	
8	Loss	2–1 (5)	Jack McKenzie	TKO	2 (6)	Jan 28, 1904	17 years, 134 days	Broadway A.C., Philadelphia, Pennsylvania, U.S.	
7	Win	2–0 (5)	Tom Daly	KO	1 (6)	Jan 21, 1904	17 years, 127 days	Broadway A.C., Philadelphia, Pennsylvania, U.S.	
6	Win	1–0 (5)	Young George Marshall	NWS	6	Dec 17, 1903	17 years, 92 days	Broadway A.C., Philadelphia, Pennsylvania, U.S.	
5	Win	1–0 (4)	Young Joe Grim	KO	4 (6)	Oct 27, 1903	17 years, 41 days	Southern A.C., Philadelphia, Pennsylvania, U.S.	
4	Win	0–0 (4)	Billy Keaton	NWS	6	Sep 15, 1903	16 years, 364 days	Southern A.C., Philadelphia, Pennsylvania, U.S.	
3	Draw	0–0 (3)	Billy Boden	NWS	6	Sep 1, 1903	16 years, 350 days	Southern A.C., Philadelphia, Pennsylvania, U.S.	
2	Win	0–0 (2)	Billy Manning	NWS	6	Aug 25, 1903	16 years, 343 days	Southern A.C., Philadelphia, Pennsylvania, U.S.	
1	Draw	0–0 (1)	Billy Manning	NWS	6	Aug 18, 1903	16 years, 336 days	Southern A.C., Philadelphia, Pennsylvania, U.S.	

=== Unofficial record ===
172 fights	107 wins	39 losses
By knockout	47	2
By decision	59	34
By disqualification	1	3
Draws	25	
No contests	1	

Record with the inclusion of newspaper decisions in the win/loss/draw column.

No.	Result	Record	Opponent	Type	Round, time	Date	Age	Location	Notes
172	Loss	107–39–25 (1)	Joe Borrell	TKO	5 (6)	Oct 13, 1912	26 years, 27 days	Olympia A.C., Philadelphia, Pennsylvania, U.S.	
171	Win	107–38–25 (1)	Private Jack Harrison	TKO	3 (20)	Mar 17, 1912	25 years, 183 days	National Sporting Club, Covent Garden, England	
170	Win	106–38–25 (1)	Jerry Thompson	KO	14 (20)	Jan 30, 1912	25 years, 136 days	Liverpool Stadium, Pudsey Street, Liverpool, England	
169	Win	105–38–25 (1)	Johnny Mathieson	TKO	3 (?)	Dec 26, 1912	26 years, 101 days	Liverpool Stadium, Pudsey Street, Liverpool, England	
168	Loss	104–38–25 (1)	Johnny Mathieson	PTS	20	Jun 10, 1912	25 years, 268 days	Sparbrook Skating Rink, Birmingham, England	
167	Loss	104–37–25 (1)	Private Palmer	PTS	20	May 13, 1912	25 years, 240 days	Boulevard Rink, Leicester, England	
166	Win	104–36–25 (1)	Seaman Brown	KO	2 (20)	Apr 29, 1912	25 years, 226 days	Empire Skating Rink, Sparbrook, England	
165	Win	103–36–25 (1)	Harry Mansfield	PTS	20	Mar 28, 1912	25 years, 194 days	Liverpool Stadium, Pudsey Street, Liverpool, England	
164	Win	102–36–25 (1)	Dixie Kid	TKO	8 (20)	Jan 18, 1912	25 years, 124 days	Liverpool Stadium, Pudsey Street, Liverpool, England	
163	Loss	101–36–25 (1)	Georges Carpentier	PTS	20	Dec 13, 1911	25 years, 88 days	Cirque de Paris, Paris, France	
162	Draw	101–35–25 (1)	George K.O. Brown	PTS	8	Oct 9, 1911	25 years, 23 days	Southern A.C., Memphis, Tennessee, U.S.	
161	Loss	101–35–24 (1)	George Gunther	PTS	20	May 27, 1911	24 years, 253 days	Wonderland, Paris, France	
160	Loss	101–34–24 (1)	Leo Houck	PTS	20	May 3, 1911	24 years, 229 days	L'Hippodrome, Clichy, France	Lost world middleweight title claim
159	Win	101–33–24 (1)	Arthur Harman	KO	2 (15)	Mar 13, 1911	24 years, 178 days	The Ring, Blackfriars Road, Southwark, England	
158	Win	100–33–24 (1)	Charlie Duncan	KO	3 (20)	Mar 1, 1911	24 years, 166 days	Cercle de la Méditerranée, Nice, France	
157	Win	99–33–24 (1)	Blink McCloskey	PTS	25	Feb 22, 1911	24 years, 159 days	Hippodrome, Paris, France	Claimed vacant world middleweight title
156	Win	98–33–24 (1)	Stoker Hulls	KO	5 (?)	Feb 18, 1911	24 years, 155 days	Plymouth, England	
155	Win	97–33–24 (1)	Private Jim Harris	TKO	5 (20)	Feb 13, 1911	24 years, 150 days	The Empire, Holborn, England	
154	Win	96–33–24 (1)	Blink McCloskey	TKO	3 (15)	Feb 1, 1911	24 years, 138 days	Salle Wagram, Paris, France	
153	Win	95–33–24 (1)	Johnny Summers	KO	4 (20)	Jan 25, 1911	24 years, 131 days	Olympia Annexe, Kensington, England	
152	Win	94–33–24 (1)	Geoff Thorne	KO	1 (15)	Dec 14, 1910	24 years, 89 days	Salle Wagram, Paris, France	
151	Win	93–33–24 (1)	Dick Nelson	KO	2 (10)	Nov 7, 1910	24 years, 52 days	American A.C., Schenectady, New York, U.S.	
150	Draw	92–33–24 (1)	Young Loughrey	NWS	6	Oct 28, 1910	24 years, 42 days	Nonpareil A.C., Philadelphia, Pennsylvania, U.S.	
149	Win	92–33–23 (1)	Billy Glover	TKO	5 (10)	Oct 21, 1910	24 years, 35 days	Brown's Gym, New York City, New York, U.S.	
148	Loss	91–33–23 (1)	Leo Houck	NWS	6	Sep 17, 1910	24 years, 1 day	National A.C., Philadelphia, Pennsylvania, U.S.	
147	Draw	91–32–23 (1)	Harry Mansfield	NWS	10	Sep 2, 1910	23 years, 351 days	National S.C., New York City, New York, U.S.	
146	Loss	91–32–22 (1)	Leo Houck	PTS	12	Aug 23, 1910	23 years, 341 days	Armory, Boston, Massachusetts, U.S.	
145	Win	91–31–22 (1)	Young Joseph	TKO	7 (20)	Jun 27, 1910	23 years, 284 days	Wonderland, Whitechapel Road, Whitechapel, England	Retained world welterweight title
144	Win	90–31–22 (1)	Sam Harris	KO	2 (?)	Jun 11, 1910	23 years, 268 days	Salle Wagram, Paris, France	
143	Win	89–31–22 (1)	Bill Davies	KO	1 (10)	May 18, 1910	23 years, 244 days	Salle Wagram, Paris, France	Third of 3 bouts Lewis had on the same day
142	Win	88–31–22 (1)	Bert Ropert	KO	2 (10)	May 18, 1910	23 years, 244 days	Salle Wagram, Paris, France	Second of 3 bouts Lewis had on the same day
141	Win	87–31–22 (1)	Bob Scanlon	DQ	2 (10)	May 18, 1910	23 years, 244 days	Salle Wagram, Paris, France	First of 3 bouts Lewis had on the same day
140	Win	86–31–22 (1)	Peter Brown	KO	3 (20)	May 4, 1910	23 years, 230 days	Salle Wagram, Paris, France	Retained world welterweight title
139	Draw	85–31–22 (1)	Willie Lewis	PTS	25	Apr 23, 1910	23 years, 219 days	Cirque de Paris, Paris, France	Retained world welterweight title
138	Loss	85–31–21 (1)	Charley Hitte	DQ	4 (20)	Mar 12, 1910	23 years, 177 days	Wonderland, Paris, France	Lewis DQ'd for low blow
137	Draw	85–30–21 (1)	Willie Lewis	PTS	25	Feb 19, 1910	23 years, 156 days	Cirque de Paris, Paris, France	Retained world welterweight title
136	Win	85–30–20 (1)	Howard Baker	PTS	10	Jan 11, 1910	23 years, 117 days	Denver A.C., Denver, Colorado, U.S.	
135	Draw	84–30–20 (1)	Frank Klaus	NWS	6	Nov 27, 1909	23 years, 72 days	National A.C., Philadelphia, Pennsylvania, U.S.	
134	Win	84–30–19 (1)	Dan Sullivan	KO	1 (12)	Oct 19, 1909	23 years, 33 days	Armory, Boston, Massachusetts, U.S.	
133	Win	83–30–19 (1)	Eddie Chambers	TKO	1 (6)	Oct 13, 1909	23 years, 27 days	Wayne A.C., Philadelphia, Pennsylvania, U.S.	
132	Win	82–30–19 (1)	Harry Mansfield	NWS	6	Oct 6, 1909	23 years, 20 days	Philadelphia A.C., Philadelphia, Pennsylvania, U.S.	
131	Loss	81–30–19 (1)	Harry Mansfield	NWS	10	Sep 3, 1909	22 years, 352 days	Williamsport A.C., Williamsport, Pennsylvania, U.S.	
130	Win	81–29–19 (1)	Tommy Crawford	KO	2 (?)	Jul 26, 1909	22 years, 313 days	Williamsport, Pennsylvania, U.S.	
129	Win	80–29–19 (1)	Harry Mansfield	NWS	6	Jun 24, 1909	22 years, 281 days	Broadway A.C., Philadelphia, Pennsylvania, U.S.	
128	Loss	79–29–19 (1)	Frank Klaus	DQ	6 (6)	Apr 24, 1909	22 years, 220 days	Nonpareil A.C., Philadelphia, Pennsylvania, U.S.	
127	Win	79–28–19 (1)	Terry Martin	NWS	6	Mar 26, 1909	22 years, 191 days	Nonpareil A.C., Philadelphia, Pennsylvania, U.S.	
126	Win	78–28–19 (1)	George Krall	KO	1 (3)	Mar 18, 1909	22 years, 183 days	Broadway A.C., Philadelphia, Pennsylvania, U.S.	Second of 2 bouts for Lewis on the same day
125	Win	77–28–19 (1)	Johnny Dugan	TKO	2 (3)	Mar 18, 1909	22 years, 183 days	Broadway A.C., Philadelphia, Pennsylvania, U.S.	First of 2 bouts for Lewis on the same day
124	Loss	76–28–19 (1)	Tommy Sullivan	NWS	6	Mar 6, 1909	22 years, 171 days	National A.C., Philadelphia, Pennsylvania, U.S.	
123	Loss	76–27–19 (1)	Bill MacKinnon	PTS	12	Feb 2, 1909	22 years, 139 days	Armory A.A., Boston, Massachusetts, U.S.	
122	Win	76–26–19 (1)	Harry Mansfield	NWS	6	Jan 5, 1909	22 years, 111 days	Douglas A.C., Philadelphia, Pennsylvania, U.S.	
121	Loss	75–26–19 (1)	Willie Lewis	NWS	12	Dec 14, 1908	22 years, 89 days	Grand Opera House, New Haven, Connecticut, U.S.	
120	Draw	75–25–19 (1)	Unk Russell	NWS	6	Oct 1, 1908	22 years, 15 days	Old City Hall, Pittsburgh, Pennsylvania, U.S.	
119	Win	75–25–18 (1)	Terry Martin	TKO	5 (6)	Sep 25, 1908	22 years, 9 days	National S.C., New York City, New York, U.S.	
118	Win	74–25–18 (1)	Unk Russell	PTS	12	Sep 7, 1908	21 years, 357 days	Armory A.A., Boston, Massachusetts, U.S.	
117	Win	73–25–18 (1)	Unk Russell	NWS	6	Jul 14, 1908	21 years, 302 days	Auditorium, Bangor, Maine, U.S.	
116	Win	72–25–18 (1)	Jim Donovan	PTS	6	Jun 29, 1908	21 years, 287 days	Bangor, Maine, U.S.	
115	Win	71–25–18 (1)	Larry Temple	PTS	12	Jun 23, 1908	21 years, 281 days	Armory A.A., Boston, Massachusetts, U.S.	
114	Loss	70–25–18 (1)	Willie Lewis	NWS	6	Jun 9, 1908	21 years, 267 days	National S.C., New York City, New York, U.S.	
113	Win	70–24–18 (1)	Unk Russell	NWS	6	May 23, 1908	21 years, 250 days	National A.C., Philadelphia, Pennsylvania, U.S.	
112	Win	69–24–18 (1)	Charley Hitte	NWS	6	May 19, 1908	21 years, 246 days	National S.C., New York City, New York, U.S.	
111	Win	68–24–18 (1)	Unk Russell	NWS	6	May 9, 1908	21 years, 236 days	National A.C., Philadelphia, Pennsylvania, U.S.	
110	Win	67–24–18 (1)	Larry Conley	KO	3 (?)	Apr 27, 1908	21 years, 224 days	Augusta, Maine, U.S.	
109	Win	66–24–18 (1)	William 'Honey' Mellody	KO	4 (12), 2:30	Apr 20, 1908	21 years, 217 days	Armory, Boston, Massachusetts, U.S.	Retained world welterweight title claim
108	Win	65–24–18 (1)	Terry Martin	PTS	15	Mar 26, 1908	21 years, 192 days	Eureka Athletic Club, Baltimore, Maryland, U.S.	Retained world welterweight title claim
107	Loss	64–24–18 (1)	Terry Martin	NWS	6	Feb 15, 1908	21 years, 152 days	National A.C., Philadelphia, Pennsylvania, U.S.	
106	Win	64–23–18 (1)	Frank Mantell	TKO	3 (12)	Jan 23, 1908	21 years, 129 days	Edgewood A.C., New Haven, Connecticut, U.S.	Claimed world welterweight title
105	Win	63–23–18 (1)	Pat O'Keefe	PTS	12	Dec 23, 1907	21 years, 98 days	Winnisimmet A.C., Chelsea, Massachusetts, U.S.	
104	Loss	62–23–18 (1)	Terry Martin	NWS	6	Dec 16, 1907	21 years, 91 days	Spring Garden A.C., Philadelphia, Pennsylvania, U.S.	
103	Loss	62–22–18 (1)	Jack Blackburn	NWS	6	Nov 20, 1907	21 years, 65 days	National A.C., Philadelphia, Pennsylvania, U.S.	
102	Win	62–21–18 (1)	Mike Donovan	NWS	6	Nov 1, 1907	21 years, 46 days	Industrial Hall, Philadelphia, Pennsylvania, U.S.	
101	Win	61–21–18 (1)	Cub White	NWS	6	Oct 17, 1907	21 years, 31 days	Broadway A.C., Philadelphia, Pennsylvania, U.S.	
100	Win	60–21–18 (1)	Cub White	NWS	3	Oct 3, 1907	21 years, 17 days	Broadway A.C., Philadelphia, Pennsylvania, U.S.	Second of 2 bouts for Lewis on the same day
99	Win	59–21–18 (1)	Kid Stein	NWS	3	Oct 3, 1907	21 years, 17 days	Broadway A.C., Philadelphia, Pennsylvania, U.S.	First of 2 bouts for Lewis on the same day
98	Win	58–21–18 (1)	Kid Locke	NWS	3	Aug 8, 1907	20 years, 326 days	Broadway A.C., Philadelphia, Pennsylvania, U.S.	Second of 2 bouts for Lewis on the same day
97	Win	57–21–18 (1)	Boxer Kelly	NWS	3	Aug 8, 1907	20 years, 326 days	Broadway A.C., Philadelphia, Pennsylvania, U.S.	First of 2 bouts for Lewis on the same day
96	Win	56–21–18 (1)	Kid Locke	NWS	3	Jul 25, 1907	20 years, 312 days	Broadway A.C., Philadelphia, Pennsylvania, U.S.	Second of 2 bouts for Lewis on the same day
95	Win	55–21–18 (1)	Boxer Kelly	NWS	3	Jul 25, 1907	20 years, 312 days	Broadway A.C., Philadelphia, Pennsylvania, U.S.	First of 2 bouts for Lewis on the same day
94	Win	54–21–18 (1)	Jack Goldswain	TKO	5 (6)	Jul 16, 1907	20 years, 303 days	National A.C., Philadelphia, Pennsylvania, U.S.	
93	Win	53–21–18 (1)	Billy Griffith	KO	2 (?)	Jul 1, 1907	20 years, 288 days	National S.C., New York City, New York, U.S.	
92	Win	52–21–18 (1)	Dave Deshler	TKO	2 (6)	Jun 22, 1907	20 years, 279 days	National A.C., Philadelphia, Pennsylvania, U.S.	
91	Win	51–21–18 (1)	Billy Griffith	NWS	6	Jun 20, 1907	20 years, 277 days	Broadway A.C., Philadelphia, Pennsylvania, U.S.	
90	Win	50–21–18 (1)	Jack Roller	KO	4 (6)	Jun 13, 1907	20 years, 270 days	Broadway A.C., Philadelphia, Pennsylvania, U.S.	
89	Win	49–21–18 (1)	Tommy Sullivan	NWS	6	Jun 8, 1907	20 years, 265 days	National A.C., Philadelphia, Pennsylvania, U.S.	
88	Loss	48–21–18 (1)	Jimmy Gardner	PTS	10	May 21, 1907	20 years, 247 days	Coliseum A.C., Denver, Colorado, U.S.	
87	Win	48–20–18 (1)	Jimmy Perry	TKO	6 (?)	Feb 28, 1907	20 years, 165 days	Pueblo, Colorado, U.S.	
86	Win	47–20–18 (1)	Mike 'Twin' Sullivan	PTS	10	Feb 21, 1907	20 years, 158 days	Denver, Colorado, U.S.	
85	Win	46–20–18 (1)	Rube Smith	KO	8 (?)	Jan 22, 1907	20 years, 128 days	Denver, Colorado, U.S.	
84	Win	45–20–18 (1)	Mike Ward	KO	9 (?)	Nov 15, 1906	20 years, 60 days	Grand Rapids, Michigan, U.S.	Ward died of injuries sustained from the fight.
83	Draw	44–20–18 (1)	Willie Fitzgerald	NWS	6	Nov 3, 1906	20 years, 48 days	National A.C., Philadelphia, Pennsylvania, U.S.	
82	Win	44–20–17 (1)	Jack Dougherty	PTS	10	Oct 19, 1906	20 years, 33 days	Milwaukee Boxing Club, Milwaukee, Wisconsin, U.S.	
81	Win	43–20–17 (1)	Willie Fitzgerald	KO	2 (6)	Oct 13, 1906	20 years, 27 days	National A.C., Philadelphia, Pennsylvania, U.S.	
80	Loss	42–20–17 (1)	Joe Thomas	NWS	6	Sep 29, 1906	20 years, 13 days	National A.C., Philadelphia, Pennsylvania, U.S.	
79	Win	42–19–17 (1)	Kid Herrick	KO	3 (?)	Sep 13, 1906	19 years, 362 days	Grand Rapids, Michigan, U.S.	
78	Win	41–19–17 (1)	Jimmy Briggs	PTS	15	Sep 3, 1906	19 years, 352 days	Saginaw, Michigan, U.S.	
77	Loss	40–19–17 (1)	Maurice Sayers	DQ	6 (?)	Aug 9, 1906	19 years, 327 days	Grand Rapids, Michigan, U.S.	
76	Win	40–18–17 (1)	Jimmy Briggs	PTS	10	Jul 12, 1906	19 years, 299 days	Powers' Opera House, Grand Rapids, Michigan, U.S.	
75	Win	39–18–17 (1)	Tom Prendergast	TKO	4 (10)	Jun 28, 1906	19 years, 285 days	Powers' Opera House, Grand Rapids, Michigan, U.S.	
74	Draw	38–18–17 (1)	Joe Gans	NWS	6	Jun 15, 1906	19 years, 272 days	National A.C., Philadelphia, Pennsylvania, U.S.	
73	Loss	38–18–16 (1)	Willie Fitzgerald	NWS	6	May 12, 1906	19 years, 238 days	National A.C., Philadelphia, Pennsylvania, U.S.	
72	Loss	38–17–16 (1)	Willie Fitzgerald	NWS	6	Mar 31, 1906	19 years, 196 days	National A.C., Philadelphia, Pennsylvania, U.S.	
71	Loss	38–16–16 (1)	Jimmy Gardner	NWS	6	Mar 10, 1906	19 years, 175 days	National A.C., Philadelphia, Pennsylvania, U.S.	
70	Win	38–15–16 (1)	Adam Ryan	NWS	6	Feb 24, 1906	19 years, 161 days	National A.C., Philadelphia, Pennsylvania, U.S.	
69	Win	37–15–16 (1)	Jimmy Gardner	NWS	6	Feb 10, 1906	19 years, 147 days	National A.C., Philadelphia, Pennsylvania, U.S.	
68	Win	36–15–16 (1)	Ambrose McGarry	NWS	3	Feb 1, 1906	19 years, 138 days	New York City, New York, U.S.	
67	Loss	35–15–16 (1)	Willie Lewis	NWS	3	Jan 25, 1906	19 years, 131 days	Marlborough A.C., New York City, New York, U.S.	
66	Win	35–14–16 (1)	Harry Edels	NWS	6	Jan 13, 1906	19 years, 119 days	National A.C., Philadelphia, Pennsylvania, U.S.	
65	Win	34–14–16 (1)	Maurice Sayers	NWS	6	Dec 25, 1905	19 years, 100 days	National A.C., Philadelphia, Pennsylvania, U.S.	
64	Draw	33–14–16 (1)	Tommy Connolly	NWS	10	Dec 5, 1905	19 years, 80 days	Eureka Athletic Club, Reading, Pennsylvania, U.S.	
63	Win	33–14–15 (1)	Arthur Cote	NWS	6	Dec 4, 1905	19 years, 79 days	Washington S.C., Philadelphia, Pennsylvania, U.S.	
62	Win	32–14–15 (1)	Kid Stein	NWS	6	Nov 16, 1905	19 years, 61 days	Broadway A.C., Philadelphia, Pennsylvania, U.S.	
61	Win	31–14–15 (1)	Unk Russell	NWS	6	Nov 9, 1905	19 years, 54 days	Broadway A.C., Philadelphia, Pennsylvania, U.S.	
60	Win	30–14–15 (1)	Young Donahue	NWS	6	Oct 30, 1905	19 years, 44 days	Washington S.C., Philadelphia, Pennsylvania, U.S.	
59	Win	29–14–15 (1)	Unk Russell	NWS	6	Oct 21, 1905	19 years, 35 days	National A.C., Philadelphia, Pennsylvania, U.S.	
58	Win	28–14–15 (1)	Jack Dorman	TKO	4 (?)	Sep 28, 1905	19 years, 12 days	Douglas Club, Chelsea, Massachusetts, U.S.	
57	Loss	27–14–15 (1)	Kid Sullivan	PTS	15	Sep 22, 1905	19 years, 6 days	Eureka A.C., Baltimore, Maryland, U.S.	
56	Loss	27–13–15 (1)	Young Erne	NWS	6	Sep 7, 1905	18 years, 356 days	Broadway A.C., Philadelphia, Pennsylvania, U.S.	
55	Loss	27–12–15 (1)	Sammy Smith	NWS	6	Aug 28, 1905	18 years, 346 days	National A.C., Philadelphia, Pennsylvania, U.S.	
54	Win	27–11–15 (1)	Kid Locke	NWS	6	Aug 24, 1905	18 years, 342 days	Broadway A.C., Philadelphia, Pennsylvania, U.S.	
53	Win	26–11–15 (1)	Young Donahue	NWS	6	Aug 21, 1905	18 years, 339 days	National A.C., Philadelphia, Pennsylvania, U.S.	
52	Loss	25–11–15 (1)	Young Erne	PTS	15	Aug 7, 1905	18 years, 325 days	Leiperville, Pennsylvania, U.S.	
51	Loss	25–10–15 (1)	Abraham Kid Goodman	PTS	15	Jul 8, 1905	18 years, 295 days	Chelsea, Massachusetts, U.S.	
50	Loss	25–9–15 (1)	Young Erne	PTS	10	Jun 20, 1905	18 years, 277 days	Leiperville, Pennsylvania, U.S.	
49	Draw	25–8–15 (1)	Willie Fitzgerald	NWS	6	Jun 3, 1905	18 years, 260 days	National A.C., Philadelphia, Pennsylvania, U.S.	
48	Win	25–8–14 (1)	Young Erne	NWS	6	May 27, 1905	18 years, 253 days	National A.C., Philadelphia, Pennsylvania, U.S.	
47	Win	24–8–14 (1)	Benny Yanger	TKO	1 (15)	May 19, 1905	18 years, 245 days	4th Regiment Armory, Baltimore, Maryland, U.S.	
46	Draw	23–8–14 (1)	Aurelio Herrera	NWS	6	May 6, 1905	18 years, 232 days	National A.C., Philadelphia, Pennsylvania, U.S.	
45	Draw	23–8–13 (1)	Kid Herman	PTS	15	Apr 28, 1905	18 years, 224 days	Baltimore, Maryland, U.S.	
44	Loss	23–8–12 (1)	Maurice Thompson	NWS	6	Mar 25, 1905	18 years, 190 days	National A.C., Philadelphia, Pennsylvania, U.S.	
43	Win	23–7–12 (1)	Tommy Love	NWS	6	Mar 17, 1905	18 years, 182 days	Southwark A.C., Philadelphia, Pennsylvania, U.S.	
42	Win	22–7–12 (1)	Kid Sullivan	NWS	6	Mar 13, 1905	18 years, 178 days	Washington S.C., Philadelphia, Pennsylvania, U.S.	
41	Draw	21–7–12 (1)	Jim Bonner	PTS	15	Feb 22, 1905	18 years, 159 days	Hummel's Hall, Pottsville, Pennsylvania, U.S.	
40	Win	21–7–11 (1)	Tony Moran	NWS	6	Feb 17, 1905	18 years, 154 days	Kensington A.C., Philadelphia, Pennsylvania, U.S.	
39	Win	20–7–11 (1)	Tim Callahan	NWS	6	Feb 13, 1905	18 years, 150 days	Washington S.C., Philadelphia, Pennsylvania, U.S.	
38	Win	19–7–11 (1)	George Decker	NWS	6	Jan 31, 1905	18 years, 137 days	Manhattan A.C., Philadelphia, Pennsylvania, U.S.	
37	Loss	18–7–11 (1)	Eddie Hanlon	NWS	6	Jan 24, 1905	18 years, 130 days	Manhattan A.C., Philadelphia, Pennsylvania, U.S.	
36	Win	18–6–11 (1)	Jack Cardiff	NWS	6	Jan 7, 1905	18 years, 113 days	National A.C., Philadelphia, Pennsylvania, U.S.	
35	Draw	17–6–11 (1)	Tommy Lowe	PTS	15	Jan 2, 1905	18 years, 108 days	Amphitheater, Glen Echo, Maryland, U.S.	
34	Loss	17–6–10 (1)	Buffalo Sunflower	NWS	6	Dec 14, 1904	18 years, 89 days	National A.C., Philadelphia, Pennsylvania, U.S.	
33	Win	17–5–10 (1)	Johnny Dohan	NWS	6	Dec 10, 1904	18 years, 85 days	National A.C., Philadelphia, Pennsylvania, U.S.	
32	Draw	16–5–10 (1)	Chester Goodwin	NWS	6	Nov 26, 1904	18 years, 71 days	National A.C., Philadelphia, Pennsylvania, U.S.	
31	Win	16–5–9 (1)	Jack Durane	NWS	6	Nov 23, 1904	18 years, 68 days	National A.C., Philadelphia, Pennsylvania, U.S.	
30	Draw	15–5–9 (1)	Kid Locke	NWS	10	Nov 21, 1904	18 years, 66 days	Reading, Pennsylvania, U.S.	
29	Win	15–5–8 (1)	Jim Bonner	NWS	6	Nov 19, 1904	18 years, 64 days	National A.C., Philadelphia, Pennsylvania, U.S.	
28	Win	14–5–8 (1)	Eddie Cody	TKO	6 (6)	Nov 18, 1904	18 years, 63 days	Manhattan A.C., Philadelphia, Pennsylvania, U.S.	
27	Win	13–5–8 (1)	George Walker	NWS	6	Nov 9, 1904	18 years, 54 days	National A.C., Philadelphia, Pennsylvania, U.S.	
26	Win	12–5–8 (1)	Kid Tyler	TKO	1 (6)	Nov 5, 1904	18 years, 50 days	National A.C., Philadelphia, Pennsylvania, U.S.	
25	Win	11–5–8 (1)	Joe Jackson	NWS	6	Nov 4, 1904	18 years, 49 days	Manhattan A.C., Philadelphia, Pennsylvania, U.S.	
24	Loss	10–5–8 (1)	Johnny Allen	NWS	6	Oct 29, 1904	18 years, 43 days	National A.C., Philadelphia, Pennsylvania, U.S.	
23	Win	10–4–8 (1)	Ben Maloney	KO	4 (6)	Oct 17, 1904	18 years, 31 days	Broadway A.C., Chester, Pennsylvania, U.S.	
22	Win	9–4–8 (1)	Mexican Jim Lee	KO	4 (6)	Oct 10, 1904	18 years, 24 days	Broadway A.C., Chester, Pennsylvania, U.S.	
21	Draw	8–4–8 (1)	Kid Tyler	NWS	6	Oct 3, 1904	18 years, 17 days	Broadway A.C., Chester, Pennsylvania, U.S.	
20	Draw	8–4–7 (1)	Young George Mack	NWS	6	Sep 26, 1904	18 years, 10 days	Broadway A.C., Chester, Pennsylvania, U.S.	
19	NC	8–4–6 (1)	Griff Jones	NC	2 (6)	Sep 9, 1904	17 years, 359 days	Manhattan A.C., Philadelphia, Pennsylvania, U.S.	
18	Win	8–4–6	Jimmy Devine	NWS	6	Sep 8, 1904	17 years, 358 days	Broadway A.C., Philadelphia, Pennsylvania, U.S.	
17	Draw	7–4–6	Young George Mack	NWS	6	Sep 5, 1904	17 years, 355 days	National Hall, Chester, Pennsylvania, U.S.	
16	Loss	7–4–5	Griff Jones	NWS	6	Jul 7, 1904	17 years, 295 days	Broadway A.C., Philadelphia, Pennsylvania, U.S.	
15	Loss	7–3–5	Young George Mack	NWS	6	Jun 27, 1904	17 years, 285 days	Broadway A.C., Chester, Pennsylvania, U.S.	
14	Loss	7–2–5	Kid Locke	NWS	6	Jun 23, 1904	17 years, 281 days	Broadway A.C., Philadelphia, Pennsylvania, U.S.	
13	Draw	7–1–5	Mexican Jim Lee	NWS	6	May 16, 1904	17 years, 243 days	Broadway A.C., Chester, Pennsylvania, U.S.	
12	Win	7–1–4	Kid Allen	NWS	6	May 9, 1904	17 years, 236 days	Broadway A.C., Chester, Pennsylvania, U.S.	
11	Draw	6–1–4	Kid Allen	NWS	6	May 6, 1904	17 years, 233 days	Frankford A.C., Philadelphia, Pennsylvania, U.S.	
10	Win	6–1–3	Jim Kohler	KO	1 (6)	Apr 15, 1904	17 years, 212 days	Southern A.C., Philadelphia, Pennsylvania, U.S.	
9	Draw	5–1–3	Mexican Jim Lee	NWS	6	Feb 8, 1904	17 years, 145 days	Broadway A.C., Chester, Pennsylvania, U.S.	
8	Loss	5–1–2	Jack McKenzie	TKO	2 (6)	Jan 28, 1904	17 years, 134 days	Broadway A.C., Philadelphia, Pennsylvania, U.S.	
7	Win	5–0–2	Tom Daly	KO	1 (6)	Jan 21, 1904	17 years, 127 days	Broadway A.C., Philadelphia, Pennsylvania, U.S.	
6	Win	4–0–2	Young George Marshall	NWS	6	Dec 17, 1903	17 years, 92 days	Broadway A.C., Philadelphia, Pennsylvania, U.S.	
5	Win	3–0–2	Young Joe Grim	KO	4 (6)	Oct 27, 1903	17 years, 41 days	Southern A.C., Philadelphia, Pennsylvania, U.S.	
4	Win	2–0–2	Billy Keaton	NWS	6	Sep 15, 1903	16 years, 364 days	Southern A.C., Philadelphia, Pennsylvania, U.S.	
3	Draw	1–0–2	Billy Boden	NWS	6	Sep 1, 1903	16 years, 350 days	Southern A.C., Philadelphia, Pennsylvania, U.S.	
2	Win	1–0–1	Billy Manning	NWS	6	Aug 25, 1903	16 years, 343 days	Southern A.C., Philadelphia, Pennsylvania, U.S.	
1	Draw	0–0–1	Billy Manning	NWS	6	Aug 18, 1903	16 years, 336 days	Southern A.C., Philadelphia, Pennsylvania, U.S.	

== See also ==
- List of select Jewish boxers
