= William "Honey" Mellody =

American boxer (1884-1919)

Honey Mellody
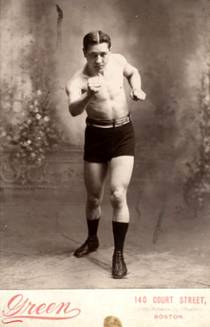

Personal information
- Nickname: "Honey"
- Nationality: American
- Born: William J. Mellody; January 15, 1884 Charlestown, Massachusetts
- Died: March 2, 1919 (aged 35)
- Height: 5 ft 7 in (170 cm)
- Weight: Welterweight

Boxing career
- Stance: Orthodox

Boxing record
- Total fights: 107
- Wins: 51
- Win by KO: 30
- Losses: 33
- Draws: 23

William "Honey" Mellody (January 15, 1884 – March 2, 1919) was an American boxer who took the Welterweight Championship of the World on October 16, 1906, defeating former champion Joe Walcott in a fifteen-round points decision in Chelsea, Massachusetts.

== Early career ==
Mellody was born on January 15, 1884, in Charlestown, Massachusetts. He fought several amateur bouts in the Boston area near the bottom of the lightweight limit in 1901 and early 1902. Turning professional, he began fighting talented opponents early in his career, drawing with Irish boxer Martin Canole at the Bowdoin Square Athletic Club in Boston in six rounds on April 29, 1902 by decision of the Boston Globe. By 1904, Canole had met welterweight contenders Jimmy Gardiner, Willie Lewis and future 1908 lightweight champion Battling Nelson.

On March 31, 1903, Mellody defeated former New England Lightweight Champion Mosey King, a native New Londoner, who would later help chair the first Connecticut Boxing Commission and serve as head coach of boxing at Yale for 46 years. On June 30, 1903, Mellody was knocked out by Joe Nelson, who would box as a talented middle and welterweight against Blink McCloskey, and gifted "Colored" Light Heavyweight World Championship contender George Robinson. Mellody had drawn with Nelson in November 1902 early in his career. In October and November 1903, he knocked out Billy Gardner, brother of leading Welterweight contender Jimmy, and defeated Belfield Walcott, brother of lightweight champion Joe.

== Winning the Welterweight "White" Championship ==
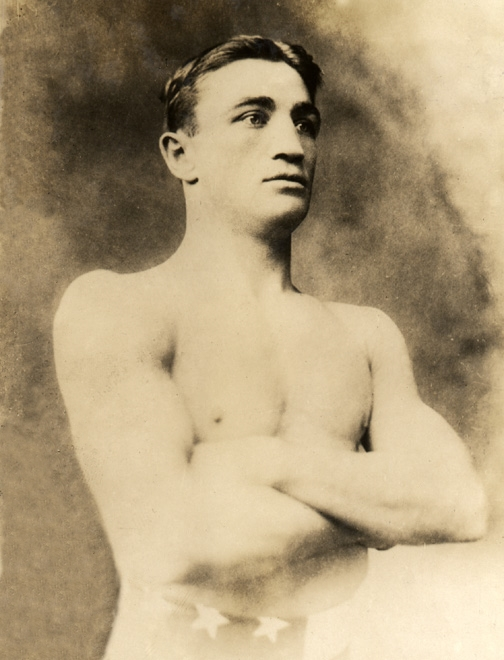
Matty Matthews

Mellody took the World "White" Championship defeating the older New York boxer Matty Matthews in a 12-round points decision in Boston on January 13, 1904. The title was a precursor to his Welterweight World Title, but carried far less authority and required a boxer to weigh very close to 142 pounds, still in the welter range. He defended his title for the World "White" Championship for 145 pounds against Martin Duffy on April 22, 1904, in a fourth-round knockout in Chicago. Mellody outweighed Duffy who was six pounds below the 145 pound limit. He defended his title twice against Jack O'Keefe in June and October 1904.

He lost the 145 pound "White" championship against talented welterweight Buddy Ryan in Chicago in a first round knockout and was down three times in the bout. He had lost to Ryan twice previously in Chicago, though one of the decisions was questionable. After losing to Ryan, Mellody began an impressive ramp up to a Welterweight World Title bout.

== Winning the World Welterweight Championship ==
After losing to Buddy Ryan, Mellody won eleven bouts by knockout prior to his first World Welterweight Championship title fight, facing boxers who could be described as competent fringe contenders. He knocked out Fred Douglas, Jerry McCarthy twice, Martin Duffy in May 1905, George Peterson in October 1905, Jack O'Keefe in November 1905, and Terry Martin twice in February and March 1906. He knocked out Charley McKeever twice in Chelsea, Massachusetts in eleven and six rounds in March and April 1906. McKeever was an older competitor a bit past his prime, but had been capable of once facing both a young Joe Walcott, and former welterweight world champion "Mysterious" Billy Smith three times. Mellody's third round knockout of contender Willie Lewis in Chelsea, Massachusetts three months before facing Walcott foreshadowed his imminent conquest of the World Welterweight Title.

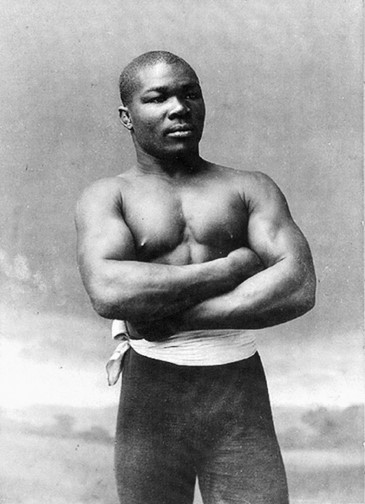
Barbados Joe Walcott

Mellody got his first shot for the World Welterweight title against the legendary Barbados Joe Walcott on October 16, 1906, at the Lincoln Athletic Club in Chelsea, Massachusetts. The Pittsburgh Press noted Mellody was barely 21 at the time of the fight and had been fighting professionally for only around three years. The bout required the full fifteen rounds before Mellody was given the decision on points against his strong and seasoned opponent.

In a rematch on November 29, 1906, Mellody beat Walcott again in a 12th-round TKO in Chelsea, although Walcott claimed an injured arm which doctors at ringside confirmed. Walcott's return to the ring after accidentally shooting himself in the hand two years earlier showed great determination, and the skill he displayed in his first title match with Mellody indicated that without his injury he may have remained champion. The New London Day echoed the same sentiment when it wrote "Age, long service, and an accident to his good right hand, along with his jovial way of living abridged Walcott's career as a champion, for he could have been a factor for many years to come were it not for the "automatic shooter" that he displayed once too often."

Mellody then defeated Willie Lewis for the second time in a non-title fight by a fourth-round TKO in Rhode Island on February 11, 1907. Lewis was soon to become a talented welterweight contender and frequent opponent of champion Harry Lewis.

Mike "Twin" Sullivan

Mellody lost the title, by referee decision, in a long twenty-round match in Los Angeles, California, against the older but possibly stronger Mike "Twin" Sullivan on April 23, 1907. Both boxers weighed in at 145, clearly in the welterweight range. The Shreveport Caucasian wrote of the bout, "At all stages Sullivan showed unmistakable superiority and out generated Mellody in infighting. Mellody's tactics were confined to rushes generally ending in clinches where Sullivan used right upper cuts and short hand jabs to the face with telling effect". The Washington Evening Star noted that "during the early rounds Mellody had an even break with his clever opponent", but "Sullivan came back strong and from the twelfth had it all his own way."

== Boxing after loss of the World Title ==
Harry Lewis

In late 1907 and early 1908, Mellody fought an impressive array of welterweight contenders, after losing to Sullivan. In November 1907, he lost to Frank Mantell in fifteen rounds in Chicago, and in February 1908, he lost to Unk Russell in a title fight. More importantly in April 1908, in a title fight, he lost to Mike Sullivan's Welterweight Championship successor Harry Lewis at the armory in Boston. The Gazette Times wrote of the fight that "Lewis scored a knockdown in the first round and in point of cleverness outclassed Mellody," in the exceptional fourth-round knockout. Several other boxers vied to claim the title as it was vacant at the time, but most sources now recognize Lewis's claim. Lewis would hold the title for three years and collect more fame and recognition as champion than either Sullivan or Mellody. Mellody started on a quest to box many of the welterweight contenders who knew a fight with the ex-champion would add to their pocketbooks and might serve as a stepping stone to their shot at a title fight.

Mellody would recover some of his form beating quality welterweights Frank Peron, Unk Russell, and Terry Martin in the first half of 1910, though no longer by quick knockout. He fought Peron twice more and Maurice Lemoine twice as well mostly to draws, with one knockout of Lemoine on August 31, 1910. Partly due to the young age at which he took the title, Mellody would continue to fight more opponents and for more years than most ex-champions. Welterweight Abe Hollandersky had fought Lemoine in a close six-round bout as a preliminary to a World Welterweight Title fight with Harry Lewis in New Haven in December 1908, and would unsuccessfully issue a challenge to Mellody as well through the New London Day on September 13, 1910. Mellody, as an ex-champion, had no trouble finding welterweights who would draw larger audiences.

== Later boxing career ==
In 1911, Mellody continued to fight rated welterweight contenders, but lost a higher percentage of his fights. He faced Jimmy Perry, Paddy Lavin, and Frank Peron in the first half of 1911, in Pittsburgh, Buffalo, and Newport, Rhode Island, losing all three, by newspaper decision. He fought Joe Stein, a less skilled boxer than many of his earlier opponents, twice more in New York in the latter half of 1911, beating him in ten-round bouts by the decision of newspapers. In the Perry fight, the Gazette Times agreed Perry had the edge, and wrote, "Jim Perry...gave that veteran formidable fighter Honey Mellody a hard battle last night before the Northern Club. Had referee Tom Bodkins been powered with the right to render a decision, he no doubt would have awarded the fight to Perry. For the first few rounds Mellody had a slight advantage in the boxing, but all ground Mellody had gained in that time was lost in the third session when Perry became effective."

In 1912, he beat Billy West twice in Manhattan clubs by a disqualification and a newspaper decision, before losing to more talented opponents Al Rogers, Terry Martin, and Terry Mitchell in fifteen-, twelve- and ten-round newspaper decisions. In the fight with Rogers on June 10, 1912, the Boston Globe noted that "Rodgers hammered the Bostonian (Mellody) all around the arena in every one of the 15 rounds."

In 1913, BoxRec noted that Mellody fought Noah Brusco, Dave Powers, and Harry Rice, losing two to newspaper decisions. Mellody seemed to have stayed close to the welterweight limit for even these later fights, though he weighed in a 150 for the Rice fight, near the upper range of welterweight fighters. These three boxers did not have the reputation or skills of the boxers he had faced in 1912.

== Later life ==
In 1908, he owned a drug store at 437 Columbus Avenue in Boston.

Roughly five to six years after his retirement from boxing, Mellody became sick and died of pneumonia on March 2, 1919. He was only thirty-five years of age.

== Professional boxing record ==
All information in this section is derived from BoxRec, unless otherwise stated.

=== Official record ===
107 fights	48 wins	17 losses
By knockout	30	6
By decision	17	10
By disqualification	1	1
Draws	21	
Newspaper decisions/draws	21	

All newspaper decisions are officially regarded as “no decision” bouts and are not counted in the win/loss/draw column.

No.	Result	Record	Opponent	Type	Round	Date	Location	Notes
107	Loss	48–17–21 (21)	Harry Price	PTS	10	Feb 25, 1913	Brooklyn Beach A.C., Brooklyn, New York City, New York, U.S.	
106	Win	48–17–21 (20)	Dave Powers	PTS	10	Jan 30, 1913	Unity Cycle Club, Lawrence, Massachusetts, U.S.	
105	Loss	47–17–21 (20)	Noah Brusso	NWS	12	Jan 14, 1913	Hammond Hall, Putnam, Connecticut, U.S.	
104	Loss	47–17–21 (19)	Terry Mitchell	NWS	10	Aug 27, 1912	Clermont Avenue Rink, Brooklyn, New York City, New York, U.S.	
103	Loss	47–17–21 (18)	Terry Martin	PTS	12	Jul 2, 1912	Manchester, New Hampshire, U.S.	
102	Loss	47–16–21 (18)	Al Rogers	PTS	15	Jun 10, 1912	Momumental Theater, Baltimore, Maryland, U.S.	
101	Win	47–15–21 (18)	Billy West	DQ	7 (10)	May 4, 1912	Sharkey A.C., New York City, New York, U.S.	
100	Draw	46–15–21 (18)	Tommy Furey	PTS	10	Feb 8, 1912	Lake Shore A.C., Worcester, Massachusetts, U.S.	
99	Draw	46–15–20 (18)	Noah Brusso	PTS	12	Jan 22, 1912	New Bedford, Massachusetts, U.S.	
98	Win	46–15–19 (18)	Billy West	NWS	10	Jan 13, 1912	Long Acre A.C., New York City, New York, U.S.	
97	Draw	46–15–19 (17)	Frank Perron	PTS	12	Jan 8, 1912	New Bedford A.A., New Bedford, Massachusetts, U.S.	
96	Loss	46–15–18 (17)	Joe Heffernan	NWS	6	Dec 25, 1911	American A.C., Philadelphia, Pennsylvania, U.S.	
95	Draw	46–15–18 (16)	Jimmy Moriarty	PTS	12	Dec 8, 1911	Higgins Hall, Lowell, Massachusetts, U.S.	
94	Draw	46–15–17 (16)	Kid Fleming	NWS	6	Nov 30, 1911	Auditorium Annex, Bangor, Maine, U.S.	
93	Draw	46–15–17 (15)	Young Nitchie	PTS	8	Nov 16, 1911	Northern Berkshire A.C., Adams, Massachusetts, U.S.	
92	Win	46–15–16 (15)	Ellis Sanborn	TKO	3 (?)	Oct 21, 1911	Auditorium Annex, Bangor, Maine, U.S.	
91	Loss	45–15–16 (15)	Terry Martin	NWS	6	Oct 12, 1911	Exposition Building, Portland, Maine, U.S.	
90	Win	45–15–16 (14)	Jim Mitchen	TKO	4 (?)	Sep 26, 1911	Johnstown Flood Building, Coney Island, New York, U.S.	
89	Draw	44–15–16 (14)	Young Griffo	NWS	6	Sep 25, 1911	American A.C., Philadelphia, Pennsylvania, U.S.	
88	Loss	44–15–16 (13)	Charley Lawrence	NWS	10	Aug 16, 1911	National S.C., White Plains, New York, U.S.	
87	Win	44–15–16 (12)	Joe Stein	NWS	10	Jul 31, 1911	Brooklyn Beach A.C., Brooklyn, New York City, New York, U.S.	
86	Win	44–15–16 (11)	Joe Stein	NWS	10	Jun 27, 1911	Brown's Gym A.A., Far Rockaway, Queens, New York City, New York, U.S.	
85	Loss	44–15–16 (10)	Willie KO Brennan	PTS	10	Jun 19, 1911	Toronto, Ontario, Canada	
84	Loss	44–14–16 (10)	Joe Stein	NWS	10	May 30, 1911	Brown's Gym A.A., Far Rockaway, Queens, New York City, New York, U.S.	
83	Loss	44–14–16 (9)	Frank Perron	NWS	10	May 29, 1911	Perry A.C., Newport, Rhode Island, U.S.	
82	Loss	44–14–16 (8)	Bill Hurley	NWS	10	Mar 20, 1911	Casino A.C., Glens Falls, New York, U.S.	
81	Loss	44–14–16 (7)	Paddy Lavin	NWS	10	Jan 24, 1911	International A.C., Buffalo, New York, U.S.	
80	Loss	44–14–16 (6)	Jimmy Perry	NWS	6	Jan 14, 1911	Old City Hall, Pittsburgh, Pennsylvania, U.S.	
79	Draw	44–14–16 (5)	Maurice Lemoine	PTS	12	Dec 7, 1910	Lakeside A.C., Webster, Massachusetts, U.S.	Agreement that if both fighters were on their feet at the end, the bout would be declared a draw
78	Loss	44–14–15 (5)	Kid Shea	NWS	12	Nov 16, 1910	City Hall, Augusta, Maine, U.S.	
77	Draw	44–14–15 (4)	Frank Perron	PTS	12	Oct 27, 1910	Fairview A.C., Southbridge, Massachusetts, U.S.	
76	Draw	44–14–14 (4)	Frank Perron	PTS	12	Sep 29, 1910	Southbridge, Massachusetts, U.S.	
75	Win	44–14–13 (4)	Maurice Lemoine	KO	10 (12)	Aug 31, 1910	Lakeside A.C., Webster, Massachusetts, U.S.	
74	Loss	43–14–13 (4)	Kid Shea	NWS	6	Jul 4, 1910	Opera House, Houlton, Maine, U.S.	
73	Loss	43–14–13 (3)	Jimmy Moriarty	PTS	12	Jun 2, 1910	Washington Park, Lowell, Massachusetts, U.S.	
72	Draw	43–13–13 (3)	Terry Martin	PTS	15	May 13, 1910	Rhode Island A.C., Thornton, Rhode Island, U.S.	
71	Loss	43–13–12 (3)	Young Loughrey	PTS	10	Apr 19, 1910	Armory, Boston, Massachusetts, U.S.	
70	Win	43–12–12 (3)	Jimmy Moriarty	PTS	8	Mar 22, 1910	Armory, Boston, Massachusetts, U.S.	
69	Win	42–12–12 (3)	Unk Russell	PTS	8	Mar 8, 1910	Armory A.A., Boston, Massachusetts, U.S.	
68	Draw	41–12–12 (3)	Jimmy Moriarty	PTS	12	Mar 1, 1910	Associate Hall, Lowell, Massachusetts, U.S.	
67	Win	41–12–11 (3)	Young Jack Johnson	PTS	12	Feb 25, 1910	Union A.C., Brockton, Massachusetts, U.S.	
66	Win	40–12–11 (3)	Frank Perron	PTS	10	Feb 1, 1910	Armory, Boston, Massachusetts, U.S.	
65	Loss	39–12–11 (3)	Kyle Whitney	NWS	10	Jan 14, 1910	National A.C., Boston, Massachusetts, U.S.	
64	Win	39–12–11 (2)	Billy Rolfe	PTS	12	Nov 25, 1909	National A.C., Boston, Massachusetts, U.S.	
63	Loss	38–12–11 (2)	Terry Martin	PTS	15	Oct 15, 1909	Queen City A.C., Manchester, New Hampshire, U.S.	
62	Draw	38–11–11 (2)	Billy Rolfe	PTS	12	Aug 24, 1909	Armory A.A., Boston, Massachusetts, U.S.	
61	Win	38–11–10 (2)	Curly Watson	KO	5 (10)	Jun 9, 1909	Tivoli Boxing-Hall, Paris, France	
60	Loss	37–11–10 (2)	Willie Lewis	KO	4 (20)	May 8, 1909	Cirque de Paris, Paris, France	
59	Loss	37–10–10 (2)	Harry Lewis	KO	4 (12)	Apr 20, 1908	Armory, Boston, Massachusetts, U.S.	For world welterweight title claim
58	Loss	37–9–10 (2)	Unk Russell	NWS	6	Apr 4, 1908	National A.C., Philadelphia, Pennsylvania, U.S.	
57	Loss	37–9–10 (1)	Frank Mantell	KO	15 (20)	Nov 1, 1907	Gymnastic Club, Dayton, Ohio, U.S.	Promoted as a world welterweight title bout Mantell made a claim to the welterweight title
56	Win	37–8–10 (1)	Jim Donovan	TKO	7 (10)	Jul 4, 1907	Brown's Gym A.A., Far Rockaway, Queens, New York City, New York, U.S.	
55	Loss	36–8–10 (1)	Mike "Twin" Sullivan	PTS	20	Apr 23, 1907	Naud Junction Pavilion, Los Angeles, California, U.S.	Lost world welterweight title
54	Loss	36–7–10 (1)	Joe Thomas	NWS	6	Mar 5, 1907	Valley Falls A.C., Valley Falls, Rhode Island, U.S.	
53	Win	36–7–10	Willie Lewis	TKO	4 (15)	Feb 11, 1907	Valley Falls A.C., Valley Falls, Rhode Island, U.S.	
52	Win	35–7–10	Terry Martin	PTS	15	Jan 8, 1907	City Hall, Augusta, Maine, U.S.	Retained world welterweight title
51	Win	34–7–10	Barbados Joe Walcott	TKO	12 (15)	Nov 29, 1906	Lincoln A.C., Chelsea, Massachusetts, U.S.	Retained world welterweight title
50	Win	33–7–10	Barbados Joe Walcott	PTS	15	Oct 16, 1906	Lincoln A.C., Chelsea, Massachusetts, U.S.	Won world welterweight title
49	Loss	32–7–10	Joe Thomas	TKO	11 (15)	Sep 3, 1906	Lincoln A.C., Chelsea, Massachusetts, U.S.	
48	Win	32–6–10	Willie Lewis	KO	3 (15)	Jul 4, 1906	Lincoln A.C., Chelsea, Massachusetts, U.S.	
47	Draw	31–6–10	Jack Dougherty	PTS	8	Apr 20, 1906	Panorama Building, Milwaukee, Wisconsin, U.S.	
46	Win	31–6–9	Charlie McKeever	KO	6 (15)	Apr 16, 1906	Lincoln A.C., Chelsea, Massachusetts, U.S.	
45	Win	30–6–9	Charlie McKeever	KO	11 (15)	Mar 26, 1906	Lincoln A.C., Chelsea, Massachusetts, U.S.	
44	Win	29–6–9	Terry Martin	KO	11 (15)	Mar 5, 1906	Lincoln A.C., Chelsea, Massachusetts, U.S.	
43	Win	28–6–9	Terry Martin	KO	12 (15)	Feb 19, 1906	Lincoln A.C., Chelsea, Massachusetts, U.S.	
42	Win	27–6–9	Jack O'Keefe	KO	14 (?)	Nov 24, 1905	Spokane Amateur A.C., Spokane, Washington, U.S.	
41	Win	26–6–9	George Peterson	KO	10 (20)	Oct 27, 1905	Spokane Amateur A.C., Spokane, Washington, U.S.	
40	Draw	25–6–9	Dick Fitzpatrick	PTS	6	Oct 7, 1905	Chicago A.A., Chicago, Illinois, U.S.	
39	Win	25–6–8	Martin Duffy	KO	1 (20)	May 12, 1905	Spokane Amateur A.C., Spokane, Washington, U.S.	
38	Win	24–6–8	Jerry McCarthy	KO	11 (?)	Apr 18, 1905	Spokane Amateur A.C., Spokane, Washington, U.S.	
37	Win	23–6–8	Jerry McCarthy	KO	15 (20)	Mar 17, 1905	Silver Bow A.C., Butte, Montana, U.S.	
36	Draw	22–6–8	Tommy Sullivan	PTS	12	Jan 27, 1905	West End A.C., Lawrence, Massachusetts, U.S.	
35	Win	22–6–7	Fred Douglas	KO	7 (?)	Jan 20, 1905	Highland A.C., Marlborough, Massachusetts, U.S.	
34	Loss	21–6–7	Buddy Ryan	KO	1 (10)	Nov 14, 1904	Harlem A.C., Chicago, Illinois, U.S.	Lost world white welterweight title claim
33	Draw	21–5–7	Dick Fitzpatrick	PTS	6	Nov 5, 1904	Chicago A.A., Chicago, Illinois, U.S.	
32	Win	21–5–6	Jack O'Keefe	PTS	10	Oct 24, 1904	Blue Island A.C., Blue Island, Illinois, U.S.	Retained world white welterweight title claim
31	Draw	20–5–6	Jack O'Keefe	PTS	20	Jun 13, 1904	Broadway Theater, Butte, Montana, U.S.	Retained world white welterweight title claim
30	Win	20–5–5	George Memsic	PTS	6	May 7, 1904	Chicago A.A., Chicago, Illinois, U.S.	
29	Win	19–5–5	Martin Duffy	KO	4 (6)	Apr 22, 1904	Battery D Armory, Chicago, Illinois, U.S.	Won world white welterweight title claim
28	Loss	18–5–5	Jack O'Keefe	PTS	6	Apr 11, 1904	American A.C., Chicago, Illinois, U.S.	
27	Win	18–4–5	Patsy Sweeney	KO	9 (10)	Mar 24, 1904	Auditorium, Portland, Maine, U.S.	
26	Loss	17–4–5	Buddy Ryan	DQ	5 (6)	Mar 4, 1904	Battery D Armory, Chicago, Illinois, U.S.	
25	Draw	17–3–5	Dick Fitzpatrick	PTS	6	Feb 27, 1904	Chicago A.A., Chicago, Illinois, U.S.	
24	Win	17–3–4	Otto Sieloff	KO	4 (6)	Feb 19, 1904	Battery D Armory, Chicago, Illinois, U.S.	
23	Loss	16–3–4	Buddy Ryan	PTS	6	Feb 12, 1904	Battery D Armory, Chicago, Illinois, U.S.	
22	Win	16–2–4	Patsy Sweeney	PTS	12	Jan 21, 1904	West End A.C., Lawrence, Massachusetts, U.S.	
21	Win	15–2–4	Eddie Connolly	TKO	1 (15)	Jan 15, 1904	Lenox A.C., Boston, Massachusetts, U.S.	
20	Win	14–2–4	Matty Matthews	PTS	12	Jan 13, 1904	Central A.C., Boston, Massachusetts, U.S.	
19	Win	13–2–4	Patsy Sweeney	PTS	12	Dec 25, 1903	West End A.C., Lawrence, Massachusetts, U.S.	
18	Draw	12–2–4	Jig Stone	PTS	15	Nov 27, 1903	Lenox A.C., Boston, Massachusetts, U.S.	
17	Win	12–2–3	Belfield Walcott	PTS	12	Nov 18, 1903	Central A.C., Boston, Massachusetts, U.S.	
16	Loss	11–2–3	George Ashley	DQ	2 (15)	Nov 9, 1903	Metropole A.C., Fall River, Massachusetts, U.S.	
15	Win	11–1–3	Billy Gardner	KO	11 (12)	Oct 9, 1903	Lenox A.C., Boston, Massachusetts, U.S.	
14	Draw	10–1–3	Jig Stone	PTS	12	Sep 25, 1903	Lenox A.C., Boston, Massachusetts, U.S.	
13	Win	10–1–2	Joe Nelson	KO	6 (?)	Jun 30, 1903	Sarsfield A.C., Boston, Massachusetts, U.S.	
12	Loss	9–1–2	Jig Stone	KO	13 (?)	May 25, 1903	Health & Physical Culture A.C., Boston, Massachusetts, U.S.	
11	Win	9–0–2	Jerry Callahan	KO	2 (?)	Apr 29, 1903	Tammany A.C., Boston, Massachusetts, U.S.	
10	Win	8–0–2	Jimmy Domino	TKO	3 (8)	Apr 20, 1903	Sarsfield A.C., Roxbury, Massachusetts, U.S.	Police stopped bout and Mellody given decision
9	Win	7–0–2	Charles Sullivan	KO	3 (?)	Apr 17, 1903	Cambridge A.C., Cambridge, Massachusetts, U.S.	
8	Win	6–0–2	Mosey King	PTS	8	Mar 31, 1903	Criterion A.C., Boston, Massachusetts, U.S.	
7	Win	5–0–2	Fred Dinsdale	KO	2 (?)	Mar 24, 1903	Criterion A.C., Boston, Massachusetts, U.S.	
6	Win	4–0–2	Billy Griffin	TKO	1 (?)	Mar 16, 1903	University A.C., Boston, Massachusetts, U.S.	
5	Win	3–0–2	Fred Sidney	PTS	6	Feb 23, 1903	Atlantic Yacht Club, Boston, Massachusetts, U.S.	
4	Win	2–0–2	Peter Ring	KO	3 (?)	Feb 17, 1903	Walpole A.C., Roxbury, Massachusetts, U.S.	
3	Win	1–0–2	Fred Sidney	PTS	6	Feb 9, 1903	Health & Physical Culture A.C., Boston, Massachusetts, U.S.	
2	Draw	0–0–2	Joe Nelson	PTS	6	Nov 3, 1902	Lenox A.C., Boston, Massachusetts, U.S.	
1	Draw	0–0–1	Martin Canole	PTS	6	Apr 29, 1902	Bowdoin Square A.C., Boston, Massachusetts, U.S.	

=== Unofficial record ===
107 fights	51 wins	33 losses
By knockout	30	6
By decision	20	26
By disqualification	1	1
Draws	23	

Record with the inclusion of newspaper decisions in the win/loss/draw column.

No.	Result	Record	Opponent	Type	Round	Date	Location	Notes
107	Loss	51–33–23	Harry Price	PTS	10	Feb 25, 1913	Brooklyn Beach A.C., Brooklyn, New York City, New York, U.S.	
106	Win	51–32–23	Dave Powers	PTS	10	Jan 30, 1913	Unity Cycle Club, Lawrence, Massachusetts, U.S.	
105	Loss	50–32–23	Noah Brusso	NWS	12	Jan 14, 1913	Hammond Hall, Putnam, Connecticut, U.S.	
104	Loss	50–31–23	Terry Mitchell	NWS	10	Aug 27, 1912	Clermont Avenue Rink, Brooklyn, New York City, New York, U.S.	
103	Loss	50–30–23	Terry Martin	PTS	12	Jul 2, 1912	Manchester, New Hampshire, U.S.	
102	Loss	50–29–23	Al Rogers	PTS	15	Jun 10, 1912	Momumental Theater, Baltimore, Maryland, U.S.	
101	Win	50–28–23	Billy West	DQ	7 (10)	May 4, 1912	Sharkey A.C., New York City, New York, U.S.	
100	Draw	49–28–23	Tommy Furey	PTS	10	Feb 8, 1912	Lake Shore A.C., Worcester, Massachusetts, U.S.	
99	Draw	49–28–22	Noah Brusso	PTS	12	Jan 22, 1912	New Bedford, Massachusetts, U.S.	
98	Win	49–28–21	Billy West	NWS	10	Jan 13, 1912	Long Acre A.C., New York City, New York, U.S.	
97	Draw	48–28–21	Frank Perron	PTS	12	Jan 8, 1912	New Bedford A.A., New Bedford, Massachusetts, U.S.	
96	Loss	48–28–20	Joe Heffernan	NWS	6	Dec 25, 1911	American A.C., Philadelphia, Pennsylvania, U.S.	
95	Draw	48–27–20	Jimmy Moriarty	PTS	12	Dec 8, 1911	Higgins Hall, Lowell, Massachusetts, U.S.	
94	Draw	48–27–19	Kid Fleming	NWS	6	Nov 30, 1911	Auditorium Annex, Bangor, Maine, U.S.	
93	Draw	48–27–18	Young Nitchie	PTS	8	Nov 16, 1911	Northern Berkshire A.C., Adams, Massachusetts, U.S.	
92	Win	48–27–17	Ellis Sanborn	TKO	3 (?)	Oct 21, 1911	Auditorium Annex, Bangor, Maine, U.S.	
91	Loss	47–27–17	Terry Martin	NWS	6	Oct 12, 1911	Exposition Building, Portland, Maine, U.S.	
90	Win	47–26–17	Jim Mitchen	TKO	4 (?)	Sep 26, 1911	Johnstown Flood Building, Coney Island, New York, U.S.	
89	Draw	46–26–17	Young Griffo	NWS	6	Sep 25, 1911	American A.C., Philadelphia, Pennsylvania, U.S.	
88	Loss	46–26–16	Charley Lawrence	NWS	10	Aug 16, 1911	National S.C., White Plains, New York, U.S.	
87	Win	46–25–16	Joe Stein	NWS	10	Jul 31, 1911	Brooklyn Beach A.C., Brooklyn, New York City, New York, U.S.	
86	Win	45–25–16	Joe Stein	NWS	10	Jun 27, 1911	Brown's Gym A.A., Far Rockaway, Queens, New York City, New York, U.S.	
85	Loss	44–25–16	Willie KO Brennan	PTS	10	Jun 19, 1911	Toronto, Ontario, Canada	
84	Loss	44–24–16	Joe Stein	NWS	10	May 30, 1911	Brown's Gym A.A., Far Rockaway, Queens, New York City, New York, U.S.	
83	Loss	44–23–16	Frank Perron	NWS	10	May 29, 1911	Perry A.C., Newport, Rhode Island, U.S.	
82	Loss	44–22–16	Bill Hurley	NWS	10	Mar 20, 1911	Casino A.C., Glens Falls, New York, U.S.	
81	Loss	44–21–16	Paddy Lavin	NWS	10	Jan 24, 1911	International A.C., Buffalo, New York, U.S.	
80	Loss	44–20–16	Jimmy Perry	NWS	6	Jan 14, 1911	Old City Hall, Pittsburgh, Pennsylvania, U.S.	
79	Draw	44–19–16	Maurice Lemoine	PTS	12	Dec 7, 1910	Lakeside A.C., Webster, Massachusetts, U.S.	Agreement that if both fighters were on their feet at the end, the bout would be declared a draw
78	Loss	44–19–15	Kid Shea	NWS	12	Nov 16, 1910	City Hall, Augusta, Maine, U.S.	
77	Draw	44–18–15	Frank Perron	PTS	12	Oct 27, 1910	Fairview A.C., Southbridge, Massachusetts, U.S.	
76	Draw	44–18–14	Frank Perron	PTS	12	Sep 29, 1910	Southbridge, Massachusetts, U.S.	
75	Win	44–18–13	Maurice Lemoine	KO	10 (12)	Aug 31, 1910	Lakeside A.C., Webster, Massachusetts, U.S.	
74	Loss	43–18–13	Kid Shea	NWS	6	Jul 4, 1910	Opera House, Houlton, Maine, U.S.	
73	Loss	43–17–13	Jimmy Moriarty	PTS	12	Jun 2, 1910	Washington Park, Lowell, Massachusetts, U.S.	
72	Draw	43–16–13	Terry Martin	PTS	15	May 13, 1910	Rhode Island A.C., Thornton, Rhode Island, U.S.	
71	Loss	43–16–12	Young Loughrey	PTS	10	Apr 19, 1910	Armory, Boston, Massachusetts, U.S.	
70	Win	43–15–12	Jimmy Moriarty	PTS	8	Mar 22, 1910	Armory, Boston, Massachusetts, U.S.	
69	Win	42–15–12	Unk Russell	PTS	8	Mar 8, 1910	Armory A.A., Boston, Massachusetts, U.S.	
68	Draw	41–15–12	Jimmy Moriarty	PTS	12	Mar 1, 1910	Associate Hall, Lowell, Massachusetts, U.S.	
67	Win	41–15–11	Young Jack Johnson	PTS	12	Feb 25, 1910	Union A.C., Brockton, Massachusetts, U.S.	
66	Win	40–15–11	Frank Perron	PTS	10	Feb 1, 1910	Armory, Boston, Massachusetts, U.S.	
65	Loss	39–15–11	Kyle Whitney	NWS	10	Jan 14, 1910	National A.C., Boston, Massachusetts, U.S.	
64	Win	39–14–11	Billy Rolfe	PTS	12	Nov 25, 1909	National A.C., Boston, Massachusetts, U.S.	
63	Loss	38–14–11	Terry Martin	PTS	15	Oct 15, 1909	Queen City A.C., Manchester, New Hampshire, U.S.	
62	Draw	38–13–11	Billy Rolfe	PTS	12	Aug 24, 1909	Armory A.A., Boston, Massachusetts, U.S.	
61	Win	38–13–10	Curly Watson	KO	5 (10)	Jun 9, 1909	Tivoli Boxing-Hall, Paris, France	
60	Loss	37–13–10	Willie Lewis	KO	4 (20)	May 8, 1909	Cirque de Paris, Paris, France	
59	Loss	37–12–10	Harry Lewis	KO	4 (12)	Apr 20, 1908	Armory, Boston, Massachusetts, U.S.	For world welterweight title claim
58	Loss	37–11–10	Unk Russell	NWS	6	Apr 4, 1908	National A.C., Philadelphia, Pennsylvania, U.S.	
57	Loss	37–10–10	Frank Mantell	KO	15 (20)	Nov 1, 1907	Gymnastic Club, Dayton, Ohio, U.S.	Promoted as a world welterweight title bout Mantell made a claim to the welterweight title
56	Win	37–9–10	Jim Donovan	TKO	7 (10)	Jul 4, 1907	Brown's Gym A.A., Far Rockaway, Queens, New York City, New York, U.S.	
55	Loss	36–9–10	Mike "Twin" Sullivan	PTS	20	Apr 23, 1907	Naud Junction Pavilion, Los Angeles, California, U.S.	Lost world welterweight title
54	Loss	36–8–10	Joe Thomas	NWS	6	Mar 5, 1907	Valley Falls A.C., Valley Falls, Rhode Island, U.S.	
53	Win	36–7–10	Willie Lewis	TKO	4 (15)	Feb 11, 1907	Valley Falls A.C., Valley Falls, Rhode Island, U.S.	
52	Win	35–7–10	Terry Martin	PTS	15	Jan 8, 1907	City Hall, Augusta, Maine, U.S.	Retained world welterweight title
51	Win	34–7–10	Barbados Joe Walcott	TKO	12 (15)	Nov 29, 1906	Lincoln A.C., Chelsea, Massachusetts, U.S.	Retained world welterweight title
50	Win	33–7–10	Barbados Joe Walcott	PTS	15	Oct 16, 1906	Lincoln A.C., Chelsea, Massachusetts, U.S.	Won world welterweight title
49	Loss	32–7–10	Joe Thomas	TKO	11 (15)	Sep 3, 1906	Lincoln A.C., Chelsea, Massachusetts, U.S.	
48	Win	32–6–10	Willie Lewis	KO	3 (15)	Jul 4, 1906	Lincoln A.C., Chelsea, Massachusetts, U.S.	
47	Draw	31–6–10	Jack Dougherty	PTS	8	Apr 20, 1906	Panorama Building, Milwaukee, Wisconsin, U.S.	
46	Win	31–6–9	Charlie McKeever	KO	6 (15)	Apr 16, 1906	Lincoln A.C., Chelsea, Massachusetts, U.S.	
45	Win	30–6–9	Charlie McKeever	KO	11 (15)	Mar 26, 1906	Lincoln A.C., Chelsea, Massachusetts, U.S.	
44	Win	29–6–9	Terry Martin	KO	11 (15)	Mar 5, 1906	Lincoln A.C., Chelsea, Massachusetts, U.S.	
43	Win	28–6–9	Terry Martin	KO	12 (15)	Feb 19, 1906	Lincoln A.C., Chelsea, Massachusetts, U.S.	
42	Win	27–6–9	Jack O'Keefe	KO	14 (?)	Nov 24, 1905	Spokane Amateur A.C., Spokane, Washington, U.S.	
41	Win	26–6–9	George Peterson	KO	10 (20)	Oct 27, 1905	Spokane Amateur A.C., Spokane, Washington, U.S.	
40	Draw	25–6–9	Dick Fitzpatrick	PTS	6	Oct 7, 1905	Chicago A.A., Chicago, Illinois, U.S.	
39	Win	25–6–8	Martin Duffy	KO	1 (20)	May 12, 1905	Spokane Amateur A.C., Spokane, Washington, U.S.	
38	Win	24–6–8	Jerry McCarthy	KO	11 (?)	Apr 18, 1905	Spokane Amateur A.C., Spokane, Washington, U.S.	
37	Win	23–6–8	Jerry McCarthy	KO	15 (20)	Mar 17, 1905	Silver Bow A.C., Butte, Montana, U.S.	
36	Draw	22–6–8	Tommy Sullivan	PTS	12	Jan 27, 1905	West End A.C., Lawrence, Massachusetts, U.S.	
35	Win	22–6–7	Fred Douglas	KO	7 (?)	Jan 20, 1905	Highland A.C., Marlborough, Massachusetts, U.S.	
34	Loss	21–6–7	Buddy Ryan	KO	1 (10)	Nov 14, 1904	Harlem A.C., Chicago, Illinois, U.S.	Lost world white welterweight title claim
33	Draw	21–5–7	Dick Fitzpatrick	PTS	6	Nov 5, 1904	Chicago A.A., Chicago, Illinois, U.S.	
32	Win	21–5–6	Jack O'Keefe	PTS	10	Oct 24, 1904	Blue Island A.C., Blue Island, Illinois, U.S.	Retained world white welterweight title claim
31	Draw	20–5–6	Jack O'Keefe	PTS	20	Jun 13, 1904	Broadway Theater, Butte, Montana, U.S.	Retained world white welterweight title claim
30	Win	20–5–5	George Memsic	PTS	6	May 7, 1904	Chicago A.A., Chicago, Illinois, U.S.	
29	Win	19–5–5	Martin Duffy	KO	4 (6)	Apr 22, 1904	Battery D Armory, Chicago, Illinois, U.S.	Won world white welterweight title claim
28	Loss	18–5–5	Jack O'Keefe	PTS	6	Apr 11, 1904	American A.C., Chicago, Illinois, U.S.	
27	Win	18–4–5	Patsy Sweeney	KO	9 (10)	Mar 24, 1904	Auditorium, Portland, Maine, U.S.	
26	Loss	17–4–5	Buddy Ryan	DQ	5 (6)	Mar 4, 1904	Battery D Armory, Chicago, Illinois, U.S.	
25	Draw	17–3–5	Dick Fitzpatrick	PTS	6	Feb 27, 1904	Chicago A.A., Chicago, Illinois, U.S.	
24	Win	17–3–4	Otto Sieloff	KO	4 (6)	Feb 19, 1904	Battery D Armory, Chicago, Illinois, U.S.	
23	Loss	16–3–4	Buddy Ryan	PTS	6	Feb 12, 1904	Battery D Armory, Chicago, Illinois, U.S.	
22	Win	16–2–4	Patsy Sweeney	PTS	12	Jan 21, 1904	West End A.C., Lawrence, Massachusetts, U.S.	
21	Win	15–2–4	Eddie Connolly	TKO	1 (15)	Jan 15, 1904	Lenox A.C., Boston, Massachusetts, U.S.	
20	Win	14–2–4	Matty Matthews	PTS	12	Jan 13, 1904	Central A.C., Boston, Massachusetts, U.S.	
19	Win	13–2–4	Patsy Sweeney	PTS	12	Dec 25, 1903	West End A.C., Lawrence, Massachusetts, U.S.	
18	Draw	12–2–4	Jig Stone	PTS	15	Nov 27, 1903	Lenox A.C., Boston, Massachusetts, U.S.	
17	Win	12–2–3	Belfield Walcott	PTS	12	Nov 18, 1903	Central A.C., Boston, Massachusetts, U.S.	
16	Loss	11–2–3	George Ashley	DQ	2 (15)	Nov 9, 1903	Metropole A.C., Fall River, Massachusetts, U.S.	
15	Win	11–1–3	Billy Gardner	KO	11 (12)	Oct 9, 1903	Lenox A.C., Boston, Massachusetts, U.S.	
14	Draw	10–1–3	Jig Stone	PTS	12	Sep 25, 1903	Lenox A.C., Boston, Massachusetts, U.S.	
13	Win	10–1–2	Joe Nelson	KO	6 (?)	Jun 30, 1903	Sarsfield A.C., Boston, Massachusetts, U.S.	
12	Loss	9–1–2	Jig Stone	KO	13 (?)	May 25, 1903	Health & Physical Culture A.C., Boston, Massachusetts, U.S.	
11	Win	9–0–2	Jerry Callahan	KO	2 (?)	Apr 29, 1903	Tammany A.C., Boston, Massachusetts, U.S.	
10	Win	8–0–2	Jimmy Domino	TKO	3 (8)	Apr 20, 1903	Sarsfield A.C., Roxbury, Massachusetts, U.S.	Police stopped bout and Mellody given decision
9	Win	7–0–2	Charles Sullivan	KO	3 (?)	Apr 17, 1903	Cambridge A.C., Cambridge, Massachusetts, U.S.	
8	Win	6–0–2	Mosey King	PTS	8	Mar 31, 1903	Criterion A.C., Boston, Massachusetts, U.S.	
7	Win	5–0–2	Fred Dinsdale	KO	2 (?)	Mar 24, 1903	Criterion A.C., Boston, Massachusetts, U.S.	
6	Win	4–0–2	Billy Griffin	TKO	1 (?)	Mar 16, 1903	University A.C., Boston, Massachusetts, U.S.	
5	Win	3–0–2	Fred Sidney	PTS	6	Feb 23, 1903	Atlantic Yacht Club, Boston, Massachusetts, U.S.	
4	Win	2–0–2	Peter Ring	KO	3 (?)	Feb 17, 1903	Walpole A.C., Roxbury, Massachusetts, U.S.	
3	Win	1–0–2	Fred Sidney	PTS	6	Feb 9, 1903	Health & Physical Culture A.C., Boston, Massachusetts, U.S.	
2	Draw	0–0–2	Joe Nelson	PTS	6	Nov 3, 1902	Lenox A.C., Boston, Massachusetts, U.S.	
1	Draw	0–0–1	Martin Canole	PTS	6	Apr 29, 1902	Bowdoin Square A.C., Boston, Massachusetts, U.S.	

== See also ==
- Lineal championship
- List of welterweight boxing champions

Achievements
Preceded by Barbados Joe Walcott	World Welterweight Championship; October 16, 1906 - April 23, 1907	Succeeded by Mike "Twin" Sullivan
