= Joe White (boxer) =

Welsh boxer

Joe White was a Welsh boxer. He won the British welterweight title at Cardiff in August 1907 when he defeated Andrew Jeptha.
