= Willie Lewis (boxer) =

American boxer

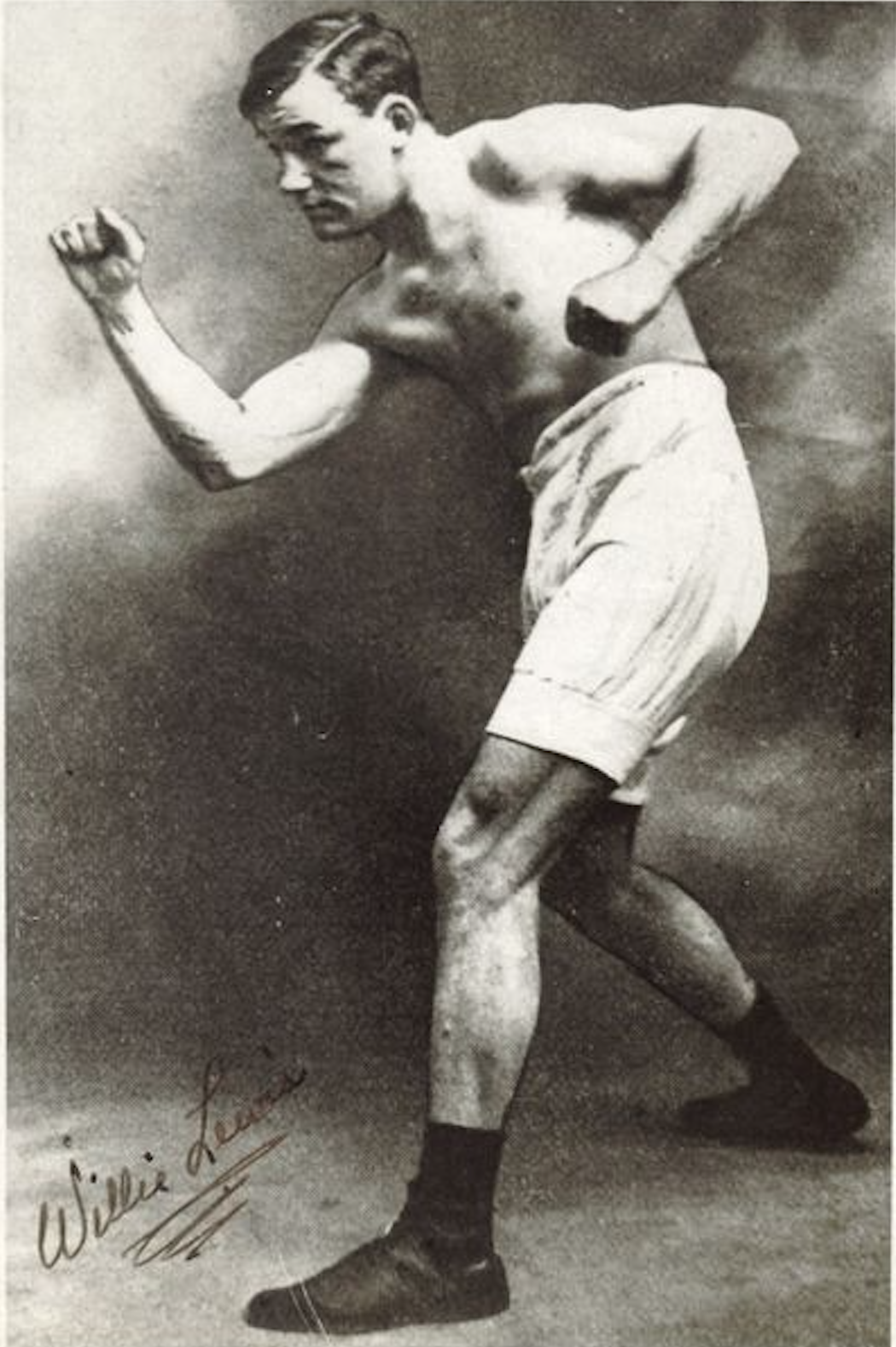

Personal information
- Nationality: American
- Born: 21 May 1884 Brooklyn, New York, United States
- Died: 18 May 1949 (aged 64) New York, United States
- Height: 5 ft 8 in (1.73 m)
- Weight: middleweight, Welterweight

Boxing career
- Reach: 69½″ (177cm)
- Stance: Orthodox

Boxing record
- Total fights: 134
- Wins: 92
- Win by KO: 40
- Losses: 28
- Draws: 14

Willie Lewis (21 May 1884 – 18 May 1949) was a professional American boxer from New York. His career spanned from 1901 to 1915. He was best known in the United States and France where In early 1910, Lewis made an unsuccessful bid at the world middleweight title losing to Billy Papke and made two unsuccessful attempts at the World welterweight title, controversially drawing against World welterweight Champion Harry Lewis (no relation) twice in Paris. In 1913 Lewis' heavyweight hunting gun exploded, damaging his leg. In 1920, Lewis was shot in an ambush attack and seriously wounded in his Cafe in New York.

Lewis died of cancer on 18 May 1949.

Notable bouts
Res.	Record	Opponent	Type	Round	Date	Location	Notes
Loss	85-22-10	(France) Georges Carpentier	PTS	20	1912-05-22	(France) Cirque de Paris, Paris	World Middleweight title attempt against 18 year old prodigy
Draw	74-11-08	(United States) Harry Lewis	PTS	25	1910-03-23	(France) Cirque de Paris, Paris	Second attempt at World Welterweight Title ends in draw
Draw	74-10-07	(United States) Harry Lewis	PTS	25	1910-02-19	(France) Cirque de Paris, Paris	Attempt at World Welterweight Title ends in draw
win	68-09-07	(South Africa) Andrew Jeptha	KO	3(20)	1909-05-26	(United Kingdom) Arena, Charing Cross, London	
win	49-9-07	(United States) Walter Stanton	KO	5(20)	1908-05-02	(France) Cirque de Paris, Paris	Billed as World 150lb Welterweight Title, refereed by Heavyweight World Champion Tommy Burns
