= Bob Scanlon (boxer) =

American boxer

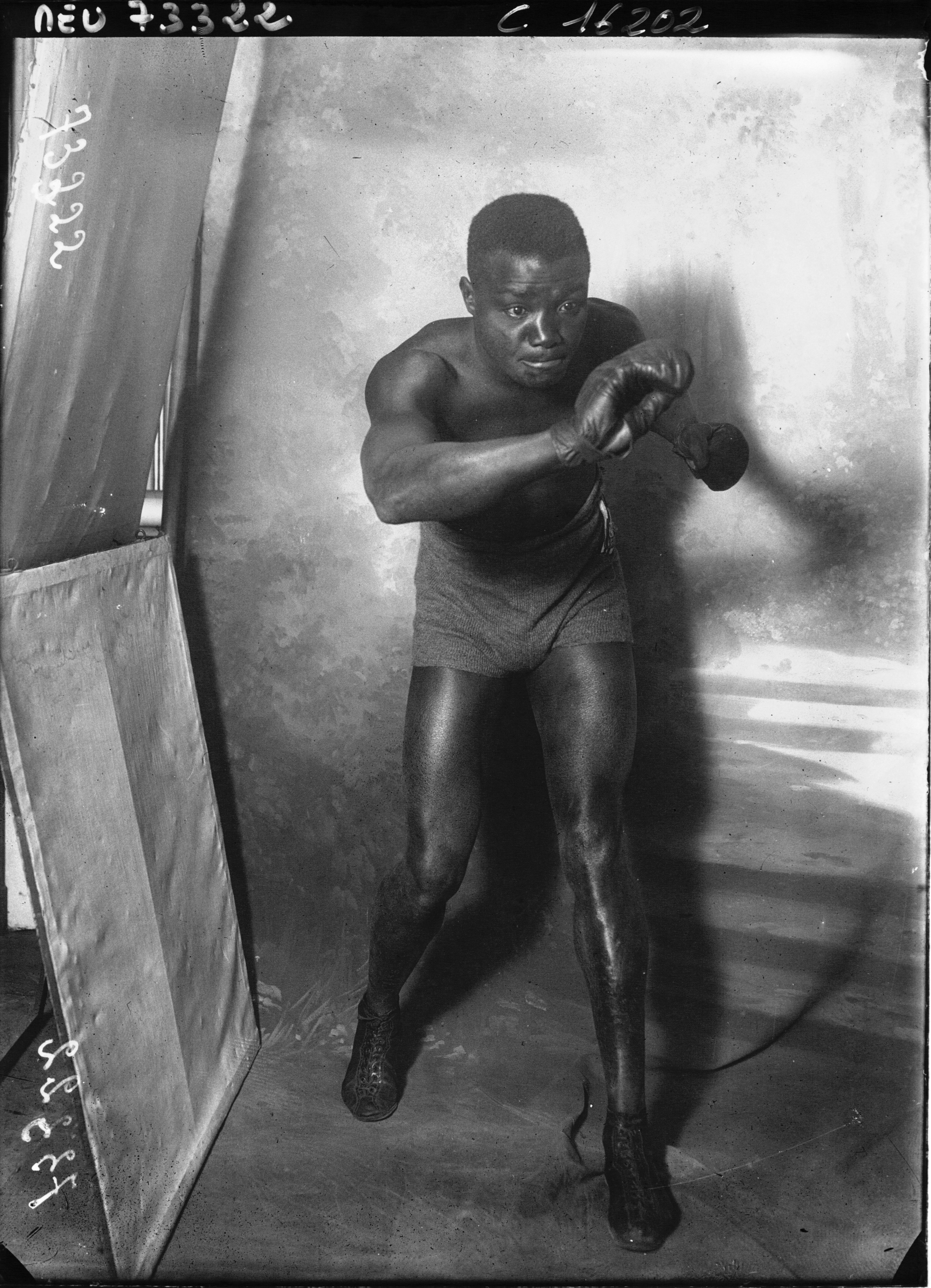
- Scanlon in 1919.

Personal information
- Nationality: American
- Born: Benjamin Lewis; February 7, 1886 Mobile, Alabama
- Died: Unknown

Boxing career

Boxing record
- Wins: 59
- Win by KO: 20
- Losses: 54
- Draws: 13

Bob Scanlon (7 February 1886 – date of death unknown) was an American boxer who partook in over 125 bouts and spent three years fighting in the French Army during the First World War. He was born in Mobile, Alabama, as Benjamin Lewis and changed his name to Bob Scanlon at an unknown date. He found success as a boxer in Europe, with most of his fights happening in England or France. He lived in Paris for most of his life. He was one of the first Americans to join the French Foreign Legion after the start of the First World War.

== Early life ==
He left for Mexico at age 16, becoming a cowboy. He soon headed to England on a ship. As soon as he arrived, he became sick with an unknown illness. He then tried to move to Canada; he was unable to secure passage, but was able to join a ship as a crew member. He spent two years before coming back to the UK. With no previous experience, he started training as a boxer in Cardiff, Wales. His first bout took place on 15 August 1904. He continued to fight in matches for almost 20 years with 59 wins, 54 losses, and 13 draws. In February 1912, Scanlon delivered an eighth-round knock-out punch to "Blink" McCloskey that reportedly left the man unconscious for a half hour.

He was a sparring partner of Jack Johnson and later Battling Siki. While living in London, Scanlon met another African-American boxer, Eugene Bullard. Owing to their similar backgrounds, they became good friends.

== World War I ==
In June 1914, Scanlon was in Paris as part of Johnson's entourage for the fight with Frank Moran. As World War I broke out, Scanlon remained in Paris and joined the French Foreign Legion in late August. He was one of 10 African Americans who joined around the same time, including his friend Bullard. Scanlon and Bullard later both transferred to the 170th French Infantry Regiment. While in the Legion, Scanlon became friends with the poet Alan Seeger.

According to one account of Scanlon's life, he had a major interest in flying and was able to build an airplane while he was living in London. A newspaper column claimed that Scanlon was the first African American to shoot down a plane while he was flying as a gunner with Norman Prince.

In his own personal account, Scanlon was wounded at the Battle of Verdun in 1916 and spent the next 18 months recovering until being discharged from the army. Newspapers accounts in 1918 claim he wanted to continue to fight in the war and went to a hospital in London to have a doctor amputate his forefinger so he could keep fighting in the army. He was most likely in London for a boxing match.

== Later life ==
Scanlon remained in Paris after the war. He continued to fight several more matches and acted as a sparring partner for Battling Siki. In September 1926, he was shot four times by a woman who was his lover. He was taken to the hospital but Scanlon considered the wounds to be superficial. She later apologized and was cleared of charges as it was considered a crime of passion.

The remaining part of Scanlon's life, including when he died or his place of death, is not known.
