= Andrew Jeptha =

South African boxer

Andrew Daries Jephtha
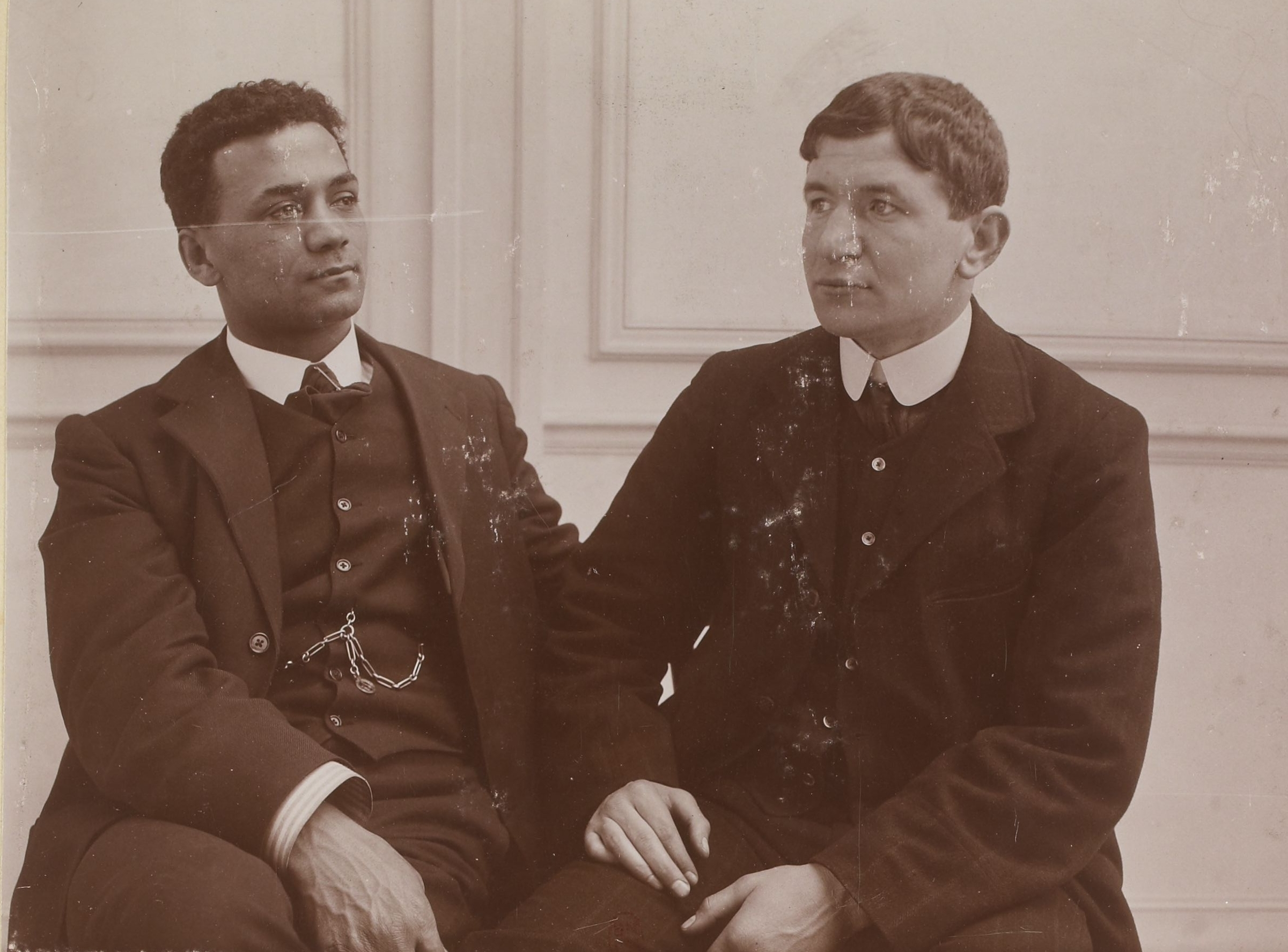
- Andrew Jephtha (L.) with Pat O'Keeffe, c. 1906-07

Personal information
- Nationality: South Africa
- Born: Andrew Daries Jeptha; 30 December 1879 Cape Town, South Africa
- Died: 1931 (aged 51–52) South Africa
- Height: 5 ft 10 in (178 cm)
- Weight: welterweight

Boxing career

Boxing record
- Total fights: 74
- Wins: 32
- Win by KO: 21
- Losses: 27
- Draws: 6
- No contests: 9

Andrew Daries Jephtha (30 December 1879 – 1931) was the first black boxer to win a British boxing title, winning the welterweight title in London on 25 March 1907. However, Jephtha is not often recognised as the first black British boxing champion.

== Early life ==
Andrew Jeptha was born on 30 December 1879 in Cape Town, Cape Colony. He was the son of a Cape Town carpenter and was educated at the Marist Brothers School in Hope Street, Cape Town. He came to England in 1902 after winning a boxing competition in South Africa organised by visiting world champion Kid McCoy. He married Abby Mitchell (born 2 December 1881 in Adlington, Lancashire) in 1904 in the District of St Marylebone, London. They had four children. Abby Mitchell was the daughter of Charles Mitchell and Mary Ellen Hope. Her parents ran the Cardwell Arms pub in Chorley Road, Adlington.

== Career ==
Jeptha became a professional boxer in South Africa before the age of 18 years, fighting as a professional in the Vaudeville Theatre and also in Fillis' Circus. He started his boxing career in England as a booth fighter and was reportedly a big attraction for Peddlar McMahon who operated a booth-fighting business.

He had 74 fights in his career, winning 32 (KO 21), losing 27 (KO11) and drawing 6. He was a popular and well known boxer. Stories about him often appeared in newspapers and he was known as "le Negre" in France and as "the Boer" in Ireland. His first recorded fight in England, which he lost, was against Jim Green in Liverpool in September 1902.

He won his British boxing title in a fight hall called Wonderland at 100 Whitechapel Road, Mile End, London on 25 March 1907, when he knocked out Curly Watson in the fourth round. The fight was arranged for a purse of five hundred and fifty pounds. At the time, Watson (who was also known as Robert Watson, Curley Watson and Seaman Watson) was the boxing champion of the Royal Navy. Curly Watson later died of injuries sustained in a fight with Frank Inglis in London on 5 March 1910. Jeptha had been having problems with damage to his eyesight since before the March 1907 title fight and had received treatment at the Moorfields Eye Hospital, and now had blurred vision.

Jeptha did not hold onto the title for long. He was defeated by Joe White in the British welterweight title fight at Cardiff in August 1907. He was at the peak of his career at this point, but knew that he needed to retire because of the problems with his eyesight. However, he kept on fighting and was able to make a living outside of boxing for a while when he appeared in a play called "Black against White". An actress called Mabel Goldswain appeared with him in this vaudeville play, along with British lightweight champion Jack Goldswain. Jeptha played the role of a villain and it is said that his eyes suffered further damage from heavy blows to the head from Goldswain in every performance.

== Later life ==
Jeptha fought Jim Doran in October 1909 and the sight in his right eye was permanently damaged during this contest. However, he continued to box until he was injured in a fight with Joe White in July 1910. Apparently, the famous referee John Douglas and his son Johnny Douglas, together with other prominent sportsman, tried to help him earn a living. Andrew Jeptha was in hospital in Liverpool for a while, but unfortunately nothing could be done to save his sight. His supporters bought him a tobacconist and confectionery shop in Walthamstow, but he was unable to make a go of it because of his lack of sight.

He returned to South Africa without his wife and children. It is recorded that he could be seen sitting on the sidewalk between the flower sellers in Adderley Street, Cape Town, selling a booklet at the price of one shilling. The title of this booklet was "A South African Boxer in Britain – Experiences of Andrew Jephta". There is a copy of this book in the South African Museum in Cape Town. 05

Andrew Jeptha died in South Africa in 1931.
