= Shadowboxer (opera) =

Shadowboxer, is a boxing opera in two acts composed by Frank Proto to a libretto by John Chenault based on the life of Joe Louis, the legendary American boxer. Conceived and directed by Leon Major at the University of Maryland Opera Studio, it premiered on 17 April 2010 at the university's Clarice Smith Performing Arts Center.

== Roles ==
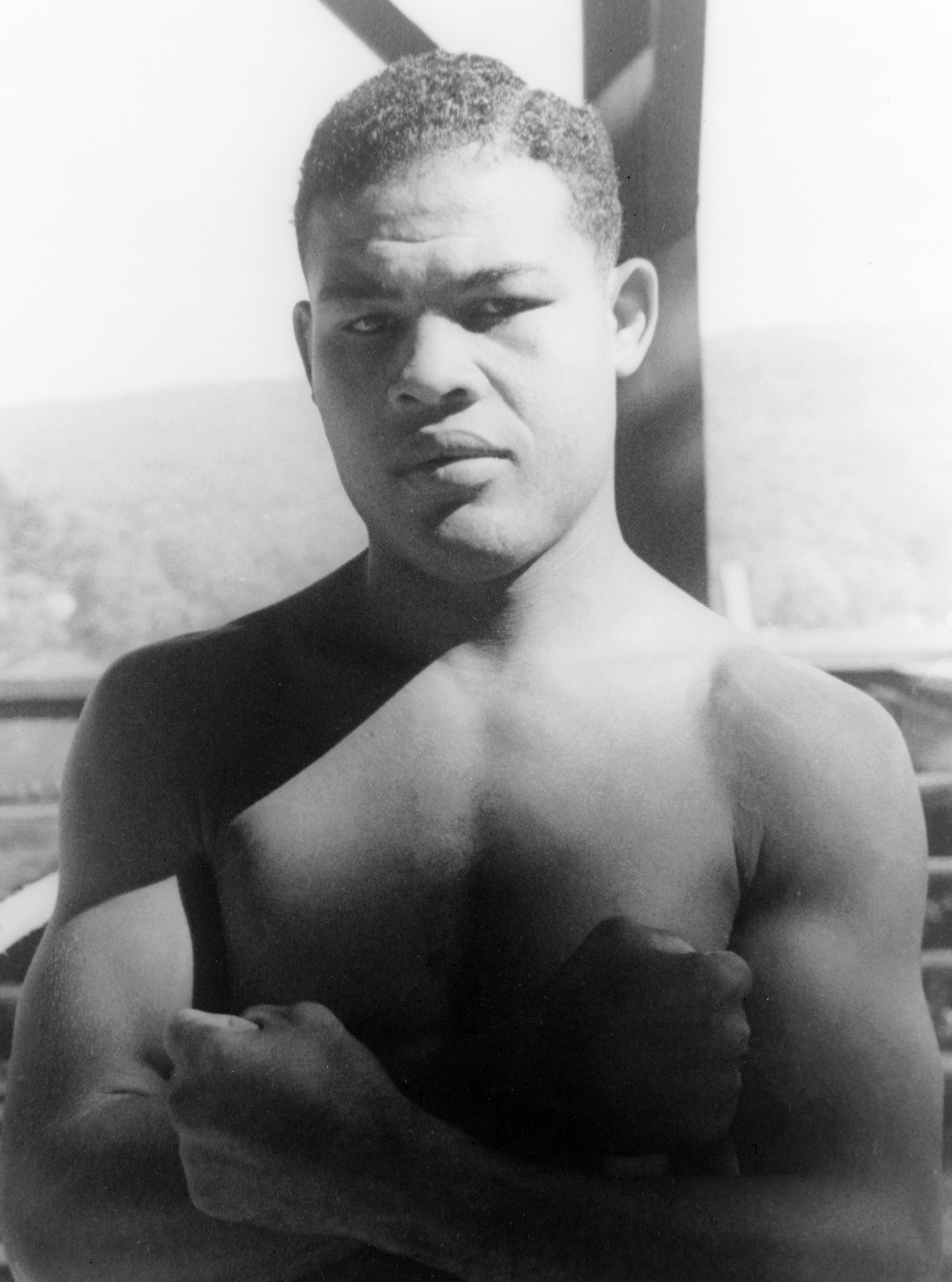
American boxer, Joe Louis

- Joe Louis – created by Jarrod Lee
- Young Joe – created by Duane Moody
- Marva Trotter – created by Adrienne Webster
- Max Schmeling – created by Peter Burroughs
- Lillie Brooks – created by Carmen Balthrop
- Jack Blackburn– created by VaShawn McIlwain
- Julian Black – created by Robert King
- John Roxborough – created by Benjamin Moore
- Ring announcer – created by David Blalock
- Beauty #1 – created by Madeline Miskie
- Beauty #2 – created by Amelia Davis
- Beauty #3 – created by Amanda Opuszynski
- Reporter #1 – created by Andrew Owens
- Reporter #2 – created by Andrew McLaughlin
- Reporter #3 – created by Colin Michael Brush
- Joe the boxer – created by Nickolas Vaughn
- Joe's opponents – created by Craig Lawrence

== Synopsis ==
The opera begins with an elderly, sickly Louis in a wheelchair, remembering scenes of his life. The first act shows him becoming a successful professional boxer and ends with his triumphal defeat of the German Max Schmeling in 1938. With this victory Louis became an American hero. The second act follows his decline, eventual defeat in the ring, and his problems with the American Internal Revenue Service.

== Sources ==
- Alenier, Karren LaLonde, "'Shadowboxer: Joe Louis Fights His Ghosts" (review), The Dressing, 21 April 2010
- Downey, Charles T, "'Shadowboxer" (review), Ionarts, 22 April 2010
- Fulford, Robert, "In This Corner: History!" (review), National Post - Toronto, 3 May 2010
- Battey, Robert, "'Shadowboxer: Based on the Life of Joe Louis' at Maryland Opera Studio" (review), Washington Post, 19 April 2010
- Weber-Petrova, Kate, "'Shadowboxer - A Tormented Joe Louis" (review), Opera Today, 24 April 2010
- Midegette, Anne, "Inspired by Joe Louis, opera 'Shadowboxer' scores one for reality", Washington Post, 17 April 2010
- Sain, Ken, "'Shadowboxer - An Opera that packs a punch" Gazette.Net, 15 April 2010
- Smith, Tim, "'Shadowboxer,' opera about legendary Joe Louis, premieres at Clarice Smith Center" (review), 'Baltimore Sun, 20 April 2010
