= Neptune Theatre (Halifax, Nova Scotia) =

Largest professional theatre company in Atlantic Canada

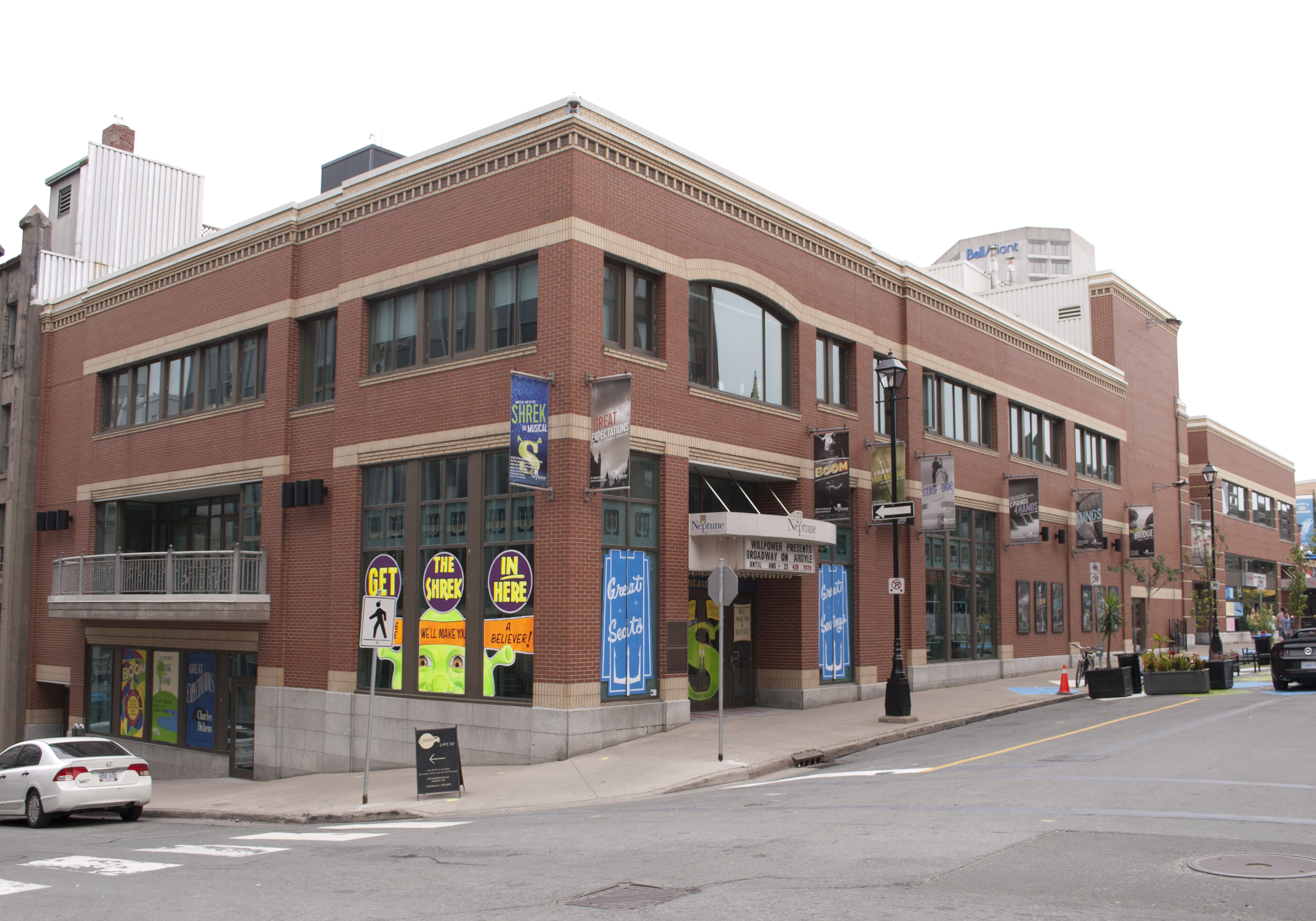
- Corner of Sackville and Argyle Streets
- Interactive map of Neptune Theatre
- Former names: The Strand Theatre (1915 – 1928); The Garrick Repertory Theatre (1928 – 1929); Neptune Theatre; 1 July 1963 – present
- Location: 1593 Argyle Street; Halifax, Nova Scotia, Canada
- Coordinates: 44°38′46.02″N 63°34′27.16″W
- Seating type: Reserved seating
- Capacity: Fountain Hall 458; Studio Theatre 163–200
- Type: Theatre

Construction
- Built: 1915
- Opened: 1963
- Renovated: 9 July 1928; 1996

Website
- www.neptunetheatre.com

The Neptune Theatre is the largest professional theatre company in Atlantic Canada with a capacity of 458 and is located in downtown Halifax, Nova Scotia, Canada. It performs a mixture of new and classical plays. It was founded in 1963.

== History ==
The theatre is named after the play Théâtre de Neptune, which was performed at Port Royal, Nova Scotia as the first theatrical production in North America.

The Neptune was opened on the site of a former cinema in 1963 during Canada's drive to create regional theatres. Its first artistic director was Leon Major. His vision was a year-round touring repertory company modelled on the Moscow Art Theatre. Play selection would be a mix of classical drama, contemporary international theatre, and new Canadian plays, similar to the Crest Theatre that Major had directed at numerous times before.

Its first President of the Board was local surgeon and CBC writer Dr. Arthur L. Murphy. Its first production was Major Barbara by George Bernard Shaw.

The building was renovated in 1997 and now has two theatres and incorporates a theatre school.

== Artistic directors ==
- Leon Major (founder, first artistic director, 1963–68)
- Heinar Piller (1969–1970)
- Robert Sherrin (1971–74)
- John Wood (1974–77)
- David Renton (1977–78)
- John Neville (1978–83)
- Tom Kerr (1983–86)
- Richard Ouzounian (1986–89)
- Linda Moore (1990–2000)
- Ron Ulrich (2000–2008)
- George Pothitos (2008–2017)
- Jeremy Webb (2017–present)
