= Carmen Balthrop =

American opera singer (1948–2021)

- Born: Carmen Arlen Balthrop; May 14, 1948; Washington, D.C., US
- Died: September 5, 2021 (aged 73); Mitchellville, Maryland, US
- Education: University of Maryland, College Park; Catholic University of America
- Occupations: Operatic soprano; voice teacher
- Known for: Title role in Treemonisha
- Spouses: Dorceal Duckens (m. 1975, divorced); Patrick A. Delaney (m. 1985)
- Children: 2
- Awards: Metropolitan Opera National Council Auditions first prize (1975)

Carmen Arlen Balthrop (May 14, 1948 – September 5, 2021) was an African American operatic soprano and voice teacher. A native of Washington, D.C., she first rose to prominence in the title role of the Houston Grand Opera's 1975 production of Scott Joplin's Treemonisha. That same year she won the Metropolitan Opera National Council Auditions. She had an international performance career that lasted into the 21st century. She concurrently worked as a voice teacher at the University of Maryland. At the time of her death in 2021, The Washington Post stated that Balthrop "joined the third generation of Black singers to overcome the long-standing color barrier in opera."

== Early life and education ==
The daughter of John Balthrop and Clementine Balthrop (nee Jordan), Carmen Arlen Balthrop was born in Washington D. C. on May 14, 1948. Her mother was a homemaker, and was mixed race with a black father and a Cherokee mother. Her African American father worked for the United States Department of Justice in the organization's printing office. She was first exposed to opera at the age of 8 when she heard Leontyne Price singing on the radio, and was so inspired by that experience that she decided she wanted to be an opera singer.

In 1967 Balthrop graduated from Theodore Roosevelt High School in Washington D. C. She studied at from the University of Maryland where she earned a Bachelor of Music degree in 1971. She soon after obtained a Master of Music degree from Catholic University of America in 1972. She pursued further voice studies in New York City with Otto Guth.

== Early career and Treemonisha ==
In 1972 she made her professional opera debut with the Baltimore Opera Company as the High Priestess in Aida with Gilda Cruz-Romo in the title role and Peter Herman Adler conducting the Baltimore Symphony. That same year she was an apprentice artist with the Wolf Trap Opera (WTO; a pre-professional opera company); performing with the WTO as Tuptim in the musical The King and I and in the minor part of Lucy in Scott Joplin's opera Treemonisha. For one of the WTO performances of the latter opera she took on the tenor role of Remus at the last minute when both the scheduled performer and his understudy were out sick. Her performance as Remus so impressed the producers, that they told her that if a professional staging happened they wanted her to take on the title character in the opera.

In 1973 Balthrop sang for the first time with the Washington National Opera (WNO, then called the Opera Society of Washington) as Virtue in L'incoronazione di Poppea. That same year she was a soloist in Bach's St Matthew Passion at the Curran Theatre given by the San Francisco Opera's Spring Opera Theater, and portrayed Barbarina in The Marriage of Figaro with the Dallas Civic Opera. In 1974 she returned to the WNO to portray Minerva in the United States premiere of Il ritorno d'Ulisse in patria which was given at the Kennedy Center. That same year she sang excerpts from the title role in Treemonisha in concerts led by Gunther Schuller at the Tanglewood Music Festival with the Boston Symphony Orchestra and at the Ford Auditorium with the Detroit Symphony Orchestra.

Balthrop performed Treemonisha in the first professional staging of Joplin's opera with the Houston Grand Opera (HGO) in 1975; a show which later transferred to first the Kennedy Center and then Broadway. In New York it ran at the Uris Theater for a limited six week engagement. Betty Allen portrayed her mother and Willard White her father in this production, and Schuller was once again conducting. Kathleen Battle was her understudy in this show. Balthrop was critically lauded in this production with the New York Daily News calling this performance a "star in born moment" for her.

The 1975 production of Treemonisha was recorded and released on disc. Balthrop later filmed the opera with the HGO in 1981 for WGBH Boston for a 1982 television broadcast on PBS's America's Music Theater. She also repeated the role on stage with the Michigan Opera Theatre in 1982.

== Metropolitan Opera and international career ==
In 1975 Balthrop won first prize in the Metropolitan Opera National Council Auditions at the age of 26. In 1976 she appeared at the Cincinnati May Festival as Euridice in Gluck's Orfeo ed Euridice with James Levine conducting the Cincinnati Symphony Orchestra, Maria Ewing as Orfeo, and Kathleen Battle as Amore. She made her Metropolitan Opera debut as Pamina in Mozart's The Magic Flute in 1977. That same year she returned to WTO as Climene in Cavalli’s L'Egisto. In 1978 she portrayed Roggiero in Rossini's Tancredi with the New York City Opera, and appeared at Carnegie Hall with the Opera Orchestra of New York as the first mermaid in Carl Maria von Weber's Oberon. She also appeared with the Michigan Opera Theatre (MOT) that year as Leila in Bizet's Les pêcheurs de perles.

Balthrop performed the title role in Monteverdi's L'incoronazione di Poppea at many theaters internationally. This included appearances as Poppea at the Festival dei Due Mondi in Spoleto, Italy (1979), the Innsbruck Festival of Early Music in Austria (1980), La Fenice in Venice (1981), and the Santa Fe Opera (1986). In 1980 she appeared at the Los Angeles Opera as Mimì in La bohème with Rico Serbo as Rodolfo. In 1981 she portrayed the role of Aurore in Opera/South's production of William Grant Still's A Bayou Legend which was filmed for television. She returned to La Fenice as Gluck's Euridice (1982) and as Poppaea in Handel’s Agrippina (1983). In 1984 repeated the role of Mozart's Pamina at the MOT with Paul Spencer Adkins as Tamino. In 1985 she performed as a guest artist at the Teatro Regio in Parma.

In the 1986-1987 season Balthrop toured as Bess in the HGO's production of George Gershwin's Porgy and Bess. The tour was organized in partnership with several other opera companies. Stops on the tour included performances at the company's home in Houston (1987), and with Greater Miami Opera (1986), the MOT (1987), Los Angeles Music Center Opera (1987), Opera Pacific (1987), Seattle Opera (1987), Portland Opera (1987), San Diego Opera (1987), San Francisco Opera (1987), Opera Omaha (1987), the Wang Center for the Performing Arts in Boston (1987), the Dallas Opera (1987), and Cleveland Opera (1987) among others. She also sang Bess in 1987 for her debut at the Théâtre du Châtelet in Paris.

In 1990 Balthrop returned to the Baltimore Opera Company as Micaela in Bizet's Carmen. In October 1991 she portrayed Liu in Puccini's Turandot for Opera Columbus (OC) with Judith Telep-Ehrlich in the title role and Rubén Domínguez as Calaf. She also appeared again with OC as Cio-Cio-San in Puccini's Madama Butterfly, and in 1999 returned to OC to portray the title role in the world premiere of Leslie Burrs's Vanqui. In 1992 she performed the role of Annie in the world premiere of Robert Greenleaf's Under the Arbor with Opera Alabama and the Alabama Symphony Orchestra.

In 1995 Balthrop sang the role of Donna Elvira to Louis Otey's Don in a concert version of Mozart's Don Giovanni with the San Antonio Symphony. That same year she portrayed Gretel in Florentine Opera's production of Humperdinck's Hansel and Gretel. In 1996 she appeared as Musetta in Tulsa Opera's production of La bohème with Stella Zambalis as Mimì. In 1997 she portrayed the title role in Carlisle Floyd's Susannah with Opera North. In December 1999 National Public Radio included her National Gallery of Art Christmas performance as part of their 2000 Millennium Celebration.

In 2002 Balthrop performed a concert with violinist Daniel Heifetz at the Perot Theatre in Texarkana, Texas that included excerpts from Treemonisha. In 2003 she reprised the title role in Vanqui at Franklin & Marshall College. In 2008 she performed the role of Lucrezia in Julius Eichberg's The Doctor Alcantara at the Music Center at Strathmore. This opera was staged in a program honoring the first opera company established in the United States by African Americans who had performed Eichberg's opera in the 19th century. In 2010 she portrayed Lillie in the world premiere of Frank Proto's Shadowboxer.

== Educator, personal life, and death ==
Balthrop married baritone Dorceal Duckens, a fellow cast member in Treemonisha, in 1975. The marriage ended in divorce. She and Duckens had one daughter, Nicole, who was born in 1980. In 1985 she married Patrick A. Delaney with whom she had a second daughter, Camille. She joined the faculty of the University of Maryland in 1985 and was a professor of voice there until her death. She was inducted into the University of Maryland Alumni Association's Hall of Fame in 1995. One of her pupils was mezzo-soprano Kendall Gladen.

She died on September 5, 2021, aged 73, at her home in Mitchellville, Maryland. The cause was cancer. Her funeral was held at Immaculate Conception Church in Washington DC.

== Discography ==
- Scott Joplin's Treemonisha
- Claudio Monteverdi's L'incoronazione di Poppea
- John Knowles Paine's Mass in D (1978), with St. Louis Symphony, conductor Gunther Schuller)
- Agrippina (2000), this performance with conductor Christopher Hogwood was recorded live in 1983 at La Fenice and released 17 years later.
- The Art of Christmas, Volume I (2004)
- Leslie Burrs' Vanqui
- The Art of Christmas, The Original
