= Leon Major =

Canadian opera and theatre director (born 1933)

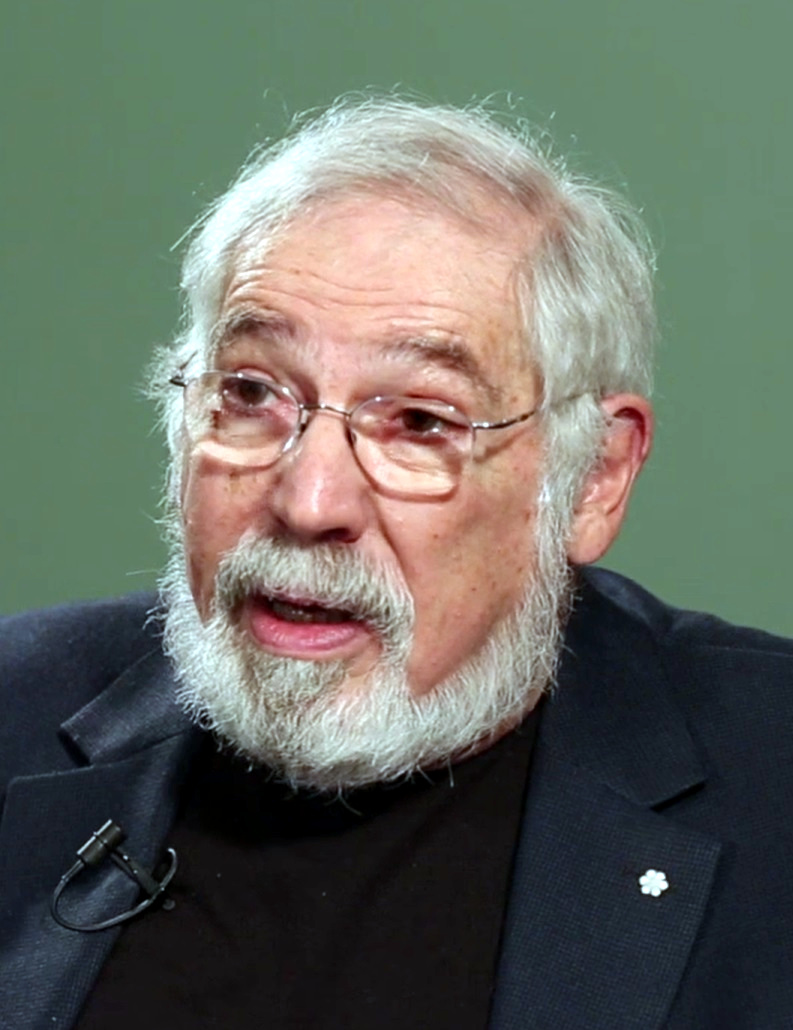
- Leon Major in a CTM Interview, 2013
- Born: 1933 (age 92–93); Toronto, Ontario, Canada
- Education: University of Toronto
- Occupations: Director; Educator
- Years active: 1955–2013
- Organization: Order of Canada

Leon Major CM (born 1933) is a Canadian opera and theatre director who has directed in North America and Europe. Besides directing, Major has been artistic director for several companies and taught academically. He is a Member of the Order of Canada.

Major was born in 1933 in Toronto, Ontario, Canada, where his father had a ladies' clothing store. In his neighbourhood on Queen Street West, he was the only Jewish kid on the block. In childhood, he had a dream of becoming a concert pianist. He attended Parkdale Collegiate where his Latin teacher gave him his "first break" in theatre, lending him and Stan Daniels CA$200 to stage a review at the Museum Theatre. It was successful enough to pay back the loan, and earned Major a "wunderkind" reputation.

Major then attended University of Toronto (U of T), studying theatre under Robert Gill. He also studied at U of T's Royal Conservatory of Music. He graduated in 1955 from U of T with a Bachelor of Arts in English.

After graduating from U of T, Major directed The Fifth Season at Jackson's Point, Ontario's Red Barn Theatre in the summer of 1955. Major worked at the university's Hart House Theatre, directing The Troublemakers, Kiss Me Kate and Patricia Joudry's Teach Me How to Cry. Teach Me How to Cry was taken to London, England by its artistic director John Steele with Major to direct. The play, retitled Noon Has No Shadows in London, was the second Canadian production, and first fully all-Canadian production (playwright, director and actors), put on in London's West End.

Toronto's Crest Theatre, committed to supporting Canadians in live theatre, offered Major the chance to direct and he signed on with the young Canadian company. Major developed his directing skills as one of Crest Theatre's main directors from 1959 through 1962, directing My Three Angels, The Hollow, Two for the Seesaw, Long Day's Journey into Night, The Heiress, Zoo Story, The Madwoman of Chaillot, Caesar and Cleopatra, Spring Thaw '62, and The Enchanted.

In 1959, Major, along with actor Les Lawrence and Wally Russell formed LRM Productions and produced The Hamlet of Stepney Green at Radio City Theatre in Toronto. In an original move, the play's scene was changed from London to Kensington Market. It was a failure and LRM was dissolved, leaving Major disillusioned with Toronto theatre, however he continued at the Crest until the spring of 1962.

After directing at the Crest, Major then helped found the Neptune Theatre in Halifax, Nova Scotia. He was the artistic director from 1963 through 1968.

Major then returned to Toronto. From 1968 to 1970, he was director of productions for Hart House Theatre.

Starting in 1970, Major was hired by Mavor Moore as artistic director for the new St. Lawrence Centre for the Arts. Under the Toronto Arts Productions/CanStage company, he directed productions such as Pinero's Trelawny of the ‘Wells’ and Brecht's Caucasian Chalk Circle. Major had hoped to set up a permanent theatre company at St. Lawrence, but he felt thwarted by "the short-sightedness of some boards and some artistic directors." In Moore's opinion, he felt that Major was dealt a poor hand. In the first year, the Centre wasn't finished, and the season was ruined. Therefore, the second season was a "play-it-safe" season, which was a disappointment to many who had expected more innovation from Major. As well as theatre, Major directed productions for the Canadian Opera Company, including Louis Riel by Harry Somers and Moore, and Heloise and Abelard by Charles Wilson and Eugene Benson. Moore thought those were "brilliant work." Major resigned in 1980, a move he described as made in "bitterness, anger and fatigue from repeated accusations by some board members and theatre critics that his ten years at the job were a wipeout."

After St Lawrence, Major worked independently. He directed at the Stratford Festival in Stratford, Ontario, and the Shaw Festival in Niagara-on-the-Lake, Ontario. His 1981 Stratford production of H.M.S. Pinafore was later presented for broadcast on television and is available on DVD. In 1983, Major spent six weeks in Amsterdam, directing opera.

In 1984, Major returned to Canada to produce The Dining Room, an independent production of Major's Gemstone Productions partnership. The play was an off-Broadway smash and Major bought the Canadian rights. Starring Douglas Rain, it played in Calgary, Ottawa, Toronto (at the St. Lawrence Centre) and Winnipeg. It was well-received by critics. He also was hired by Toronto's York University as a professor in its graduate school theatre department, teaching directing and scene study. He remained with York until 1987.

From 1987 until retirement in 2013, Major was a member of the faculty of the University of Maryland, College Park campus (UMD) and was the first artistic director of The Maryland Opera Studio at the university. Shadowboxer, an opera based on the life of Joe Louis and conceived and directed by Major, premiered on 17 April 2010 at the University of Maryland's Clarice Smith Performing Arts Center. From 1998 to 2003, he was artistic director of Boston Lyric Opera and from 2003 to 2007 he was artistic consultant for Opera Cleveland.

He has independently directed opera and theatre throughout the Americas and Europe for companies that include: the New York City Opera, Washington Opera, Glimmerglass Opera, San Diego Opera, Vancouver Opera, Teatro Municipale (Rio de Janeiro), The Opera Company of Philadelphia, Florentine Opera, Austin Lyric Opera, Wolf Trap Opera Company, the Canadian Opera Company, and The Opera Festival of New Jersey.

Major's first opera production was Leoncavallo's Pagliacci, which he directed in Toronto in 1961. Among the opera productions he has directed are: Macbeth, Falstaff, Intermezzo, Volpone, Don Pasquale, Don Carlos, Resurrection, Aida, Don Giovanni, Roméo et Juliette, La traviata, L'elisir d'amore, Carmen (on Boston Common) Eugene Onegin, The Aspern Papers, Cosi fan tutte, Il barbiere di Siviglia, and Peter Grimes. Of his New York City Opera production, the New York Times said: "Falstaff [was] directed with vitality and imagination by Leon Major."

Aside from his work as a director, Major has given master classes in Mexico City, The Shanghai Conservatory, Tel Aviv (Israeli Vocal Arts Institute) and Toronto's Royal Conservatory of Music.

Major was awarded an honorary doctorate from Dalhousie University in 1971 and is a Member of the Order of Canada.

Major and his wife Judith have four children, all born in the 1960s.
