= Jack Blackburn =

American boxer (1883–1942)

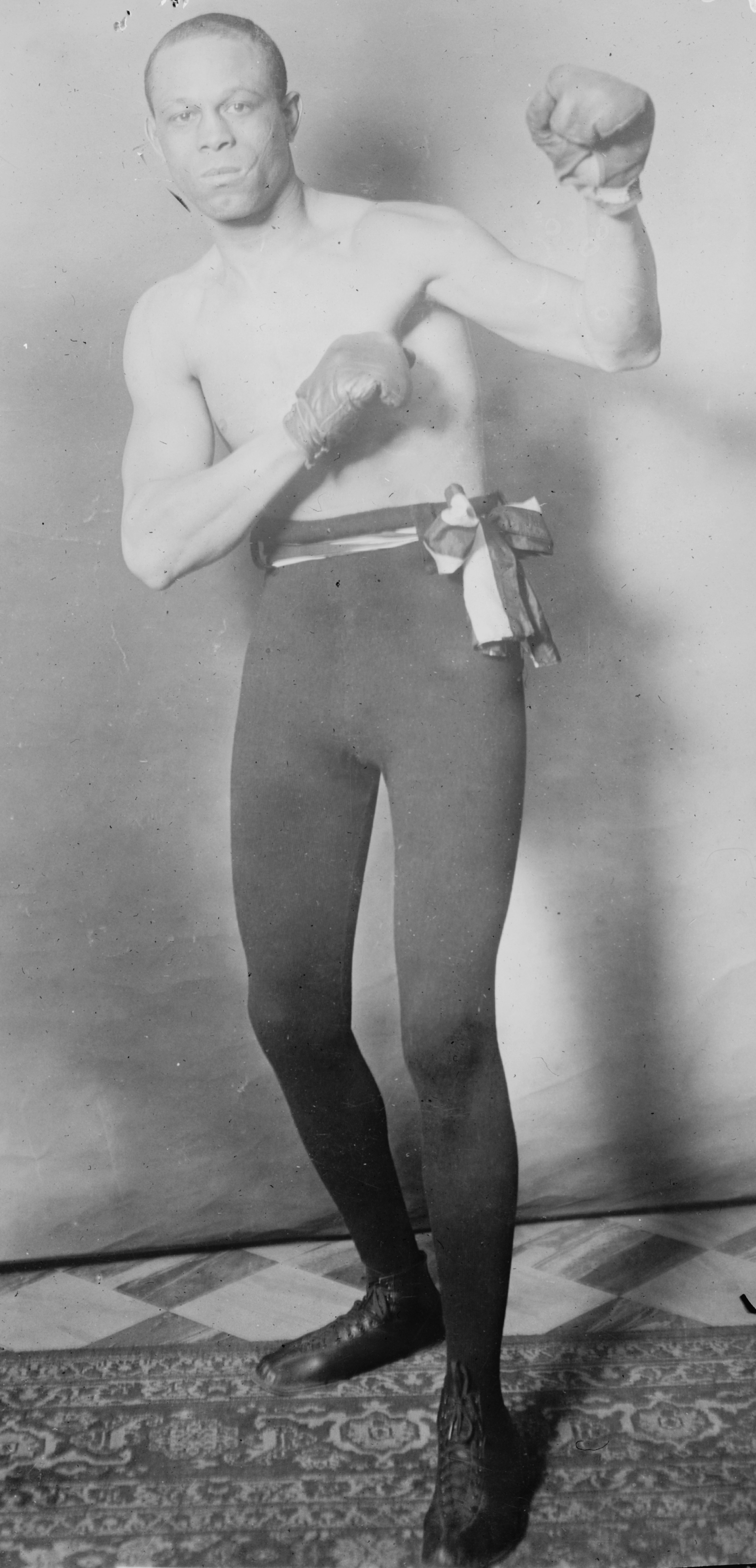

Personal information
- Born: Charles Henry Blackburn; May 20, 1883 Versailles, Kentucky, U.S.
- Died: April 24, 1942 (aged 59) Chicago, Illinois, U.S.
- Height: 5 ft 10 in (1.78 m)
- Weight: Welterweight; Lightweight

Boxing career
- Stance: Orthodox

Boxing record
- Total fights: 168; With the inclusion of newspaper decisions
- Wins: 117
- Win by KO: 34
- Losses: 24
- Draws: 22
- No contests: 5

Charles Henry "Jack" Blackburn (May 20, 1883 – April 24, 1942) was an American boxer and boxing trainer. Fighting in the first half of his career as a lightweight and later a welterweight, he was known for an exceptional defense and fought many men above his weight class, including six bouts with the great Sam Langford. He fought Joe Gans three times in no-decision bouts, defeating him once according to newspaper accounts and made good showings against Harry Lewis, Philadelphia Jack O'Brien, and Harry Greb. He found most of his fame training 1937 World Heavyweight Champion Joe Louis, but also had a significant role in training 1926 Lightweight Champion Sammy Mandell. He helped to train World Bantamweight Champion Bud Taylor and World Light-Heavyweight Champion John Henry Lewis as well.

== Early life and career ==
=== Birth in Versailles, Kentucky, May 1883 ===
Blackburn was born the son of a minister on May 20, 1883, in Versailles, Kentucky. At the age of ten he moved to Indiana, where he was raised in Indianapolis and Terre Haute. In one of his earliest bouts, according to the Pittsburgh Courier, he knocked out Eddie Gardner, brother of the better known Oscar, in eleven rounds in 1899. Frank Sutton was his trainer for a large portion of his career after Blackburn came to Pittsburgh to box around 1903. At one time Sutton operated a boxing club on Ross Street in Pittsburgh, though Blackburn did much of his mid-career boxing in Philadelphia.

Blackburn fought 147 recorded professional fights, often against considerably heavier opponents, though many of his fights were never recorded. He fought notable boxing legends Joe Gans, Sam Langford, Philadelphia Jack O'Brien, Panama Joe Gans, and Harry Greb and finished with a final record omitting newspaper decisions of 99–26–19. After retiring from boxing around 1923, he became a trainer, most notably of legendary heavyweight champion Joe Louis.

=== Bouts with Black Philadelphian boxer Dave Holly ===
Blackburn met Black Philadelphia boxer Dave Holly on at least five occasions. He first met Holly on May 4, 1903, drawing with him in a newspaper decision at the Sports Club in Philadelphia. Blackburn likely lost to Holly in a close six-round newspaper decision on November 21, 1903, at the National Athletic Club in Philadelphia. On August 26, 1904, three Philadelphia newspapers considered Blackburn the victor over Holly in a close six-round match at the Manhattan Athletic Club in Philadelphia. On January 20, 1905, the two met again in a no-decision bout in Philadelphia.

On January 10, 1906, Blackburn defeated Holly at the National Sporting Club in Wilmington, Delaware, in a close six-round newspaper decision. Blackburn floored Holly with a right to the jaw in the second round, but in the third Holly sent Blackburn to the mat for a count. In the fourth through the sixth, the Pittsburgh Press considered Blackburn to have the advantage, though the fighting was close. On October 11, 1906, the Philadelphia Item considered Blackburn the victor over Holly in a six-round match at the Broadway Athletic Club in Philadelphia. All of these matches were likely originally no-decision bouts. Holly was a Black Philadelphian boxer who would meet Sam Langford and Joe Gans on several occasions, including a bout with Joe Gans in a World Lightweight Championship bout on July 23, 1906.

== Boxing career highlights ==
=== Bouts with World Lightweight Champion Joe Gans ===
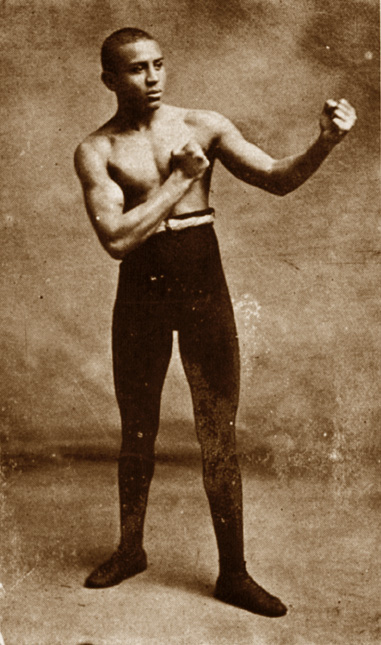
Joe Gans

Boxing with a three-inch reach advantage on November 2, 1903, Blackburn impressively defeated the great World Lightweight Champion Joe Gans in a close non-title, six-round newspaper decision at the Washington Sporting Club in Philadelphia, Pennsylvania. Blackburn was actually down in the first round from a short right to the jaw, but fought on gamely. Blackburn scored frequently with straight lefts to Gans, as well as blows to the body. On March 25, 1904, Blackburn lost to Joe Gans in Baltimore, Maryland in a fifteen-round points decision. The Philadelphia Item noted that "Gans won easily". It was Blackburn's first loss by decision, but it was to one of the greatest black lightweights in history.

On December 31, 1903, boxing as a light welterweight at 142, Blackburn lost to 1907 World Welterweight Champion Mike "Twin" Sullivan at the Chelsea Athletic Club in Chelsea, Massachusetts in fifteen rounds in the opinion of most of the Boston newspapers. The bout was most likely a pre-arranged draw.

On January 8, 1904, Blackburn drew with Black boxer Sam Bolen in a close fifteen-round decision at Shlegel's Hall in Baltimore, Maryland. The Scranton Republican felt strongly that Bolen had the better of the bout in every round but the second, when he was briefly down on the mat. He fought Bolen one other time, in a six-round win by newspaper decision on December 3, 1904, before the National Athletic Club in Philadelphia.

On October 13, 1905, Blackburn fought a fifteen-round pre-arranged draw at the Marlborough Theatre in Marborough, Massachusetts, with Black New York based boxer Larry Temple. A talented adversary, Temple would fight Joe Walcott, Sam Langford, and Harry Lewis in his career. Blackburn fought Temple on September 4, 1905, in a twelve-round draw in Sharon Pennsylvania, sandwiched between two bouts with Sam Langford.

Boxing later on June 9, 1906, Blackburn lost to Gans in a six-round bout decided in Gans' favor by newspaper decision at the National Athletic Club in Philadelphia, Pennsylvania. The Boston Morning Journal wrote that "Gans showed that he was his opponent's master in every department of the game."

=== Bouts with future World Colored Middleweight Champion Sam Langford ===
Blackburn fought the extraordinary Sam Langford a noteworthy six times in his career. On December 23, 1903, perhaps in one of his most memorable fights, Blackburn met Langford for the first time in a twelve-round pre-arranged draw at the Central Athletic Club in Boston, Massachusetts. Three local Boston papers, including the Boston Globe and Herald wrote that Blackburn likely had the better of the bout. On January 11, 1904, Blackburn and Langford fought a six-round draw at the Washington Sporting Club in Philadelphia, Pennsylvania. On September 9, 1904, Blackburn drew with Langford at the Marlborough Opera House in Marlborough, Massachusetts in a fifteen-round points decision. The fight was sensational, and Blackburn may have been outweighed by Langford by well over thirty pounds.

On September 20, 1905, in front of a substantial crowd of 600, at the Lyric Athletic Club in Allentown, Pennsylvania, Blackburn and Langford met in a ten-round draw. The boxing was fierce and drew blood and both boxers had the better of their opponent at times, with Langford finding a way to counter the keen left of Blackburn. In the third round Blackburn was doubled over the ropes by Langford, and may have been out but for the bell.

Gans and Blackburn met earlier on August 18, 1905, in Leiperville, Pennsylvania, in what was considered a great bout, though Blackburn lost in a fifteen-round points decision. Langford would rightfully claim the World Colored Heavyweight Championship when Jack Johnson vacated it in July 1909, and defend it for several fights, though he would be denied a chance at Johnson's new World Heavyweight Title. Langford would take the World Colored Middleweight Championship defeating Young Peter Jackson in a twenty-round bout on November 12, 1907, at the Pacific Athletic Club in Los Angeles.

=== Wins over Jimmy Gardner, Blink McCloskey, and George Cole 1904–07 ===
On January 2, 1904, Blackburn defeated well known light and welterweight Jimmy Gardner at the Central Athletic Club in Boston, Massachusetts in a twelve-round points decision.

On September 14, 1904, Blackburn defeated prolific Jewish Philadelphian boxer Blink McCloskey in a six-round newspaper decision by the Philadelphia Inquirer and Philadelphia Record. McCloskey was a boxer of considerable ability and usually lost only to boxers of considerable talent.

On June 10, 1905, Blackburn first met Black Philadelphian boxer George Cole in Philadelphia, losing in a six-round newspaper decision of the Philadelphia Item. Cole's win was something of an upset. On January 1, 1907, Blackburn decisively won his first newspaper decision over Cole at the Philadelphia Athletic Club, giving Cole a "bad whipping". On June 7, 1907, at the New Pen Art Club in Philadelphia, Blackburn won again in a six-round newspaper decision over Cole.

=== Ten bouts with Black boxer George Gunther ===
On January 3, 1906, Blackburn first met Black boxer George Gunther at New Castle, Pennsylvania in a fifteen-round bout, defeating him in the opinion of several newspapers. On January 31, 1906, Blackburn defeated Gunther by newspaper decision in a ten-round bout in Newcastle, Pennsylvania, though Blackburn was down in both the third and sixth rounds. Fighting as a 132-pound lightweight, Blackburn was outweighed by ten pounds though having a three-inch height advantage. On February 7 he would defeat Gunther in a six-round newspaper decision in Pittsburgh in the opinion of three Pittsburgh newspapers as well as the smaller Newcastle Herald. He would meet Gunther a total of ten times drawing with him once, and fighting many close bouts in which he was usually the victor in the opinions of most newspapers.

In their December 6, 1907, bout, Blackburn knocked out Gunther in the fifth round at the Industrial Athletic Club in Philadelphia. After sidestepping a rush by Gunther, Blackburn's knockout blow was the result of a well-timed right on Gunther's jaw. The fifth saw some heavy blows on both sides. In their April 18, 1907, six round bout at the Broadway Athletic Club in Philadelphia, Blackburn had the better of the close match, in the opinion of the Philadelphia Item but was still battered by the end. Gunther was dropped for a count of nine in the second, but showed a slight advantage in the remaining rounds and took the lead in the sixth when Blackburn showed fatigue. On May 23, 1907, against at Philadelphia's Broadway Athletic Club, Blackburn fought what the local papers ruled a draw with Gunther, though the Pittsburgh Press felt a hard left hook to Gunther's face in the fourth gave him the advantage in the bout. Gunther would face many great boxers in his career including Sam Langford, Harry Lewis, and George Carpentier in France.

=== Bouts with Jim Barry, July, September 1907 ===
On July 8, and September 5, 1907, Blackburn won by newspaper decision and then lost on points to talented opponent Jim Barry who outweighed him by about twenty pounds in both matches. The bouts were in Philadelphia, and Bridgeport, Connecticut. In their July bout Barry was down in the middle of the sixth round from a hard blow to the head and the Wilkes-Barre Evening News wrote that Blackburn had the best of every round. Barry had been a Montana cowboy and would fight some talented heavyweights in his career including Sam Langford, Battling Levinsky, and Billy Miske, though he would die tragically in a shooting after a boxing match in Ancon, Panama in March 1917.

=== Impressive bout with 1908 World Welterweight Champion Harry Lewis, November 1907 ===
Champion Harry Lewis

On November 20, 1907, before around 3000 spectators, Blackburn impressively defeated 1908 World Welterweight Champion Harry Lewis, though the six-round, no-decision bout at the National Athletic Club in Philadelphia was decided by newspaper decision of the Philadelphia Item and Philadelphia Record. The bout was a carefully boxed defensive show with neither boxer landing knockout blows. Showing an effective defense against such an exceptional boxer as Lewis was a considerable achievement for Blackburn. Blackburn appeared to land more blows than Lewis in the first two rounds, but was cautious in the third and fourth. He opened up in the fifth and sixth, being urged on by the crowd, and connected with a few powerful rights, particularly one to the ribs of Lewis which caused him to cover up. Characteristic of Blackburn's style, he effectively used his left jab throughout the bout. Blackburn's three inch reach advantage was used to his benefit. The Wilkes-Barre Evening News wrote that "the bout was so palpably one sided, even the most ardent admirers of Lewis were quieted before the third round was over." Each man collected around $1000 from the well attended bout. The New York Age wrote that "Blackburn was a marvel of science, and self-possession, outboxing his opponent at every angle, judging distance better and hitting a harder blow."

=== Loss to 1905 World Light Heavyweight Champion Philadelphia Jack O'Brien, June 1908 ===
Boxing as a 147-pound welterweight on June 10, 1908, Blackburn was defeated by Philadelphia Jack O'Brien in a six-round bout at the National Athletic Club. O'Brien knocked Blackburn down in the first round and had him groggy in the third, but Blackburn evaded a knockout in the no-decision bout. Blackburn was outweighed in the bout by slightly under twenty-five pounds, though both boxers were near equal in height. Blackburn was very briefly down in the fifth from a slip. The sixth saw many heavy blows landed but neither men down for a count. The bout was fast throughout. O'Brien had taken the World Light Heavyweight Championship in December 1905.

On December 10 and 14, 1908, Blackburn met competent Southpaw boxer Jack Robinson at the Broadway and West End Athletic Clubs in Philadelphia, winning in a close newspaper decision on the tenth, and again in a six-round newspaper decision on the fourteenth.

=== Four bouts with Mike Donovan ===
Blackburn first defeated Mike Donovan on October 18, 1907, in a six-round bout at Industrial Hall in Philadelphia in the opinion of the Philadelphia Record, though several newspapers considered the close fight a draw. On December 24, 1907, Blackburn defeated Donovan in Reading, Pennsylvania at the Bijou Theatre in a ten-round newspaper decision. On April 21, 1908, Blackburn drew with Donovan in ten rounds at the Abel Opera House in Easton, Pennsylvania. In their November 23, 1908, six round bout, at the opening of Duquesne Garden as a fight venue in Pittsburgh, The Pittsburgh Post wrote that "from start to finish, Blackburn danced around the Rochester man (Donovan), landing six blows to his opponent's one," and that he used a large repertoire of blows against which Donovan's only effective defense was to clinch.

== Trouble with the law, manslaughter conviction, 1909–14 ==
Blackburn fought outside the ring at times, which caused him trouble in his life. He served four years and eight months for manslaughter as the result of a tragic shooting spree he instigated that led to several deaths in Philadelphia in 1909. In 1935, Blackburn was indicted for manslaughter, as a result of two shootings in October of that year, though the charges were later dropped. He was briefly held in jail on October 21, 1935, and probably for a period later in that year.

== Second half of career, and return to boxing after jail sentence ==
After the completion of his jail sentence, Blackburn usually fought closer to the welterweight and light middleweight divisions, but continued to fight highly skilled opponents. His loss of training and advancing age caused by his sentence affected his boxing somewhat, and he won fewer bouts subsequent to his jail term.

=== Close loss to heavyweight Gunboat Smith, May 1914 ===
In one of his first bouts after his prison term, fighting as a 150-pound light middleweight, he lost to Gunboat Smith in a six-round newspaper decision in front of 3000 fans at the National Athletic Club in Philadelphia on May 20, 1914. Smith was a 6' 2" heavyweight who outweighed him by thirty pounds. Blackburn was down for a count of nine from a right to the forehead in the first round. Blackburn took another count of nine in the fifth round, but throughout the fight he showed pluck and often was the aggressor. In the fourth and particularly the third rounds, Blackburn kept the boxing close and may have taken the third. Smith would meet Battling Levinsky and Jack Dempsey on several occasions in his career, and was considered one of the top white heavyweight contenders at the time.

=== Exciting bout with 1923 World Middleweight Champion Harry Greb, January 1915 ===
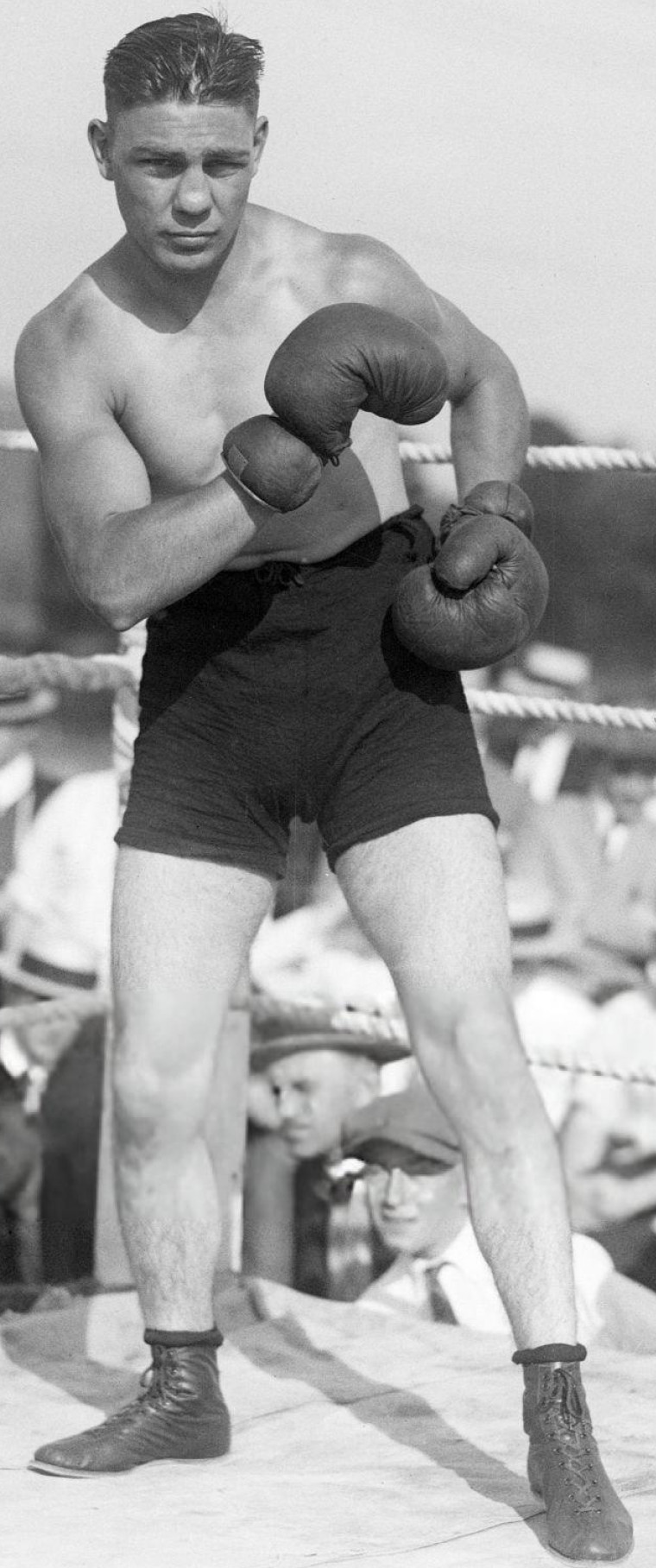
Champion Harry Greb

On January 25, 1915, Blackburn met 1923 World Middleweight Champion Harry Greb at Duquesne Garden in Pittsburgh, Pennsylvania, losing in a six-round newspaper decision of the Pittsburgh Post. Even against the great competitor Greb who was known to throw an exceptionally large number of punches, the Post wrote that Blackburn "blocked, side-stepped, slipped, rode, and ducked", putting up an excellent defense. The bout was reasonably close with Greb clearly taking around four of the six rounds. Blackburn opened up in the third, sending a stiff left to the jaw of Greb and another to the mouth. Blackburn may have taken the sixth, but Greb's ability to throw far more punches, characteristic of his style, probably helped him to win on points. The Pittsburgh Press noted Blackburn's "eel-like evasions of Greb's short range stuff", and that he "served flashes of former brilliancy", but Greb's youth, stamina, and strength was the final determinant of the fight's outcome. The Pittsburgh Post wrote that Blackburn was "so elusive that not one punch in ten that Greb started ever connected."

On August 23, 1916, Blackburn defeated Young Ahearn, a noted welter and middleweight based in Brooklyn, at the National Athletic Club in Philadelphia, Pennsylvania in a six-round newspaper decision of Philadelphia's Public Ledger, and Record. Blackburn had a two-inch advantage in height and reach, though Ahearn was six years younger at only twenty-three to Blackburn's thirty-four, an advancing age for a competitive boxer. One month later on August 8, Blackburn and Ahearn would fight a ten-round draw at the Harlem Sports Club in New York City.

On October 20 and November 3, 1916, Blackburn lost twice to powerful hitter Joe Borrell by six-round newspaper decisions at the Nonpareil Athletic Club in Philadelphia. In their October 20 bout, Blackburn staggered Borrell in the first with a right hook to the jaw, making Borrell fight more cautiously. In the sixth and final round, Borrell took the advantage, staggering Blackburn, and showing more aggression. Borrell was ten years younger than Blackburn at only twenty-four. In their November 3, bout, Borrell gave Blackburn a "severe whipping", and never let up on his opponent. Borrell reached both the head and body. In their last bout on June 15, 1917, in a six-round bout at the Cambria Club in Philadelphia, Blackburn defeated Borrell in the opinion of the Philadelphia Record, though the boxing was close.

=== Late career loss to the future Colored Light Heavyweight Champion Kid Norfolk, June 1920 ===
On June 22, 1920, Blackburn met the great future 1923 Colored Light Heavyweight World Champion Kid Norfolk, originally William Ward, losing in a fourth-round knockout at Madison Athletic Club in Philadelphia, Pennsylvania. Norfolk reportedly had a twenty-pound advantage on Blackburn and was about thirteen years younger, requiring the referee to stop the bout in the fourth round, as Blackburn could do little against his far stronger opponent. A match with such a glaring weight discrepancy would not have been made among more contemporary boxers, though Blackburn had a slight advantage in height and reach.

=== Loss to Panama Joe Gans, July 1922 ===
Blackburn fought the Barbados-born boxer Panama Joe Gans, who had boxed extensively in Panama where he lived prior to 1917. Panama Joe held the World Colored Middleweight Championship from 1920 to 1924, and held a Panamanian Lightweight Title in his youth. On July 24, 1922, Blackburn lost one of his last bouts to Gans in Indianapolis, Indiana, in a fourth-round technical knockout of a scheduled ten round bout. Panama Joe was a formidable boxer and fourteen years younger than Blackburn when they met, though Blackburn had a three-inch advantage in height and reach. Boxing at forty, Blackburn probably should not have been matched with the twenty-six year old Gans.

On March 7, 1923, Gans fought Ray Pelkey, in what was likely his last recorded bout, at the Auditorium in Oakland, California, losing in a third-round knockout. Blackburn went down to one knee in the third round and remarked to the referee that he lacked the wind to continue. The referee ended the bout as a knockout. Blackburn was boxing at forty to Pelkey's twenty-four years. Eleven years later, Blackburn would begin training Joe Louis.

=== Sammy Mandell takes World Lightweight Championship, July 1926 ===
On July 3, 1926 Sammy Mandell took the World Lightweight Championship, defeating Rocky Kansas in Chicago. Blackburn had trained Mandell on his punching skills from his earliest start in boxing.

== Working as a trainer to Joe Louis, 1934–42 ==
After retiring from boxing around 1923, Blackburn drifted from job to job before Black Chicago businessman, Julian Black chose him to train Joe Louis, who was fresh from his achievements in the Golden Gloves. Blackburn wrote he had trained Louis since June 1934, shortly before Louis's first recorded professional bout, a knockout against Jack Kracken in Chicago. He helped Louis to properly time his blows, improve his punching accuracy, and to focus on proper balance. Blackburn's greatest achievement as a trainer came on June 22, 1937, when Joe Louis took the World Heavyweight Championship from Jim Braddock at Comiskey Park in Chicago, Illinois in an eighth-round knockout. Blackburn had trouble with drinking in his later years while training Joe Louis that likely caused the deterioration of his health.

=== List of Blackburn's trainees ===
In his career, besides his long work with Joe Louis, Blackburn had roles training Light Heavyweight Champion John Henry Lewis, Bantamweight Champion Bud Taylor, as well as Art Lasky, Jackie Fields, Lew Tendler, Sailor Freedman, and Von Porat. He also trained Billy Ryan a welterweight from Cincinnati. While in Philadelphia, Blackburn briefly trained Jersey Joe Walcott.

=== Early death by heart attack in 1942 ===
He died on April 24, 1942, of a heart attack while he was being given a routine physical examination. He had been suffering from pneumonia for two months, beginning shortly before Joe Louis met Abe Simon at Madison Square Garden in March of that year. Only months before his death, Blackburn was in Louis's corner giving him advice.

Blackburn's death came particularly hard for his greatest training protégé, world heavyweight champion Joe Louis whom he had trained since Louis's first professional bout. His funeral, which several thousand attended, took place on the South side of Chicago at Pilgrim Baptist Church on April 29, 1942. He was buried at Chicago's Lincoln Cemetery. Chicago businessman Julian Black, who had helped recruit him as a trainer for Joe Louis, attended, as did Louis's manager Mike Jacobs. He was survived by his widow Laura, a stepson, a brother John, and a sister.

== Legacy ==
He is an inductee of the World Boxing Hall of Fame and was an inductee of the International Boxing Hall of Fame in the non-participant category in 1992.

He appeared as a character in the opera, Shadowboxer, based on the life of Joe Louis. He was portrayed by actor Richard Roundtree in the 2002 film Joe and Max and also by James Edwards in the 1953 movie The Joe Louis Story.

== Professional boxing record ==
All information in this section is derived from BoxRec, unless otherwise stated.

=== Official record ===
168 fights	47 wins	9 losses
By knockout	34	5
By decision	13	4
Draws	11	
No contests	5	
Newspaper decisions/draws	96	

All newspaper decisions are officially regarded as “no decision” bouts and are not counted in the win/loss/draw column.

No.	Result	Record	Opponent	Type	Round	Date	Location	Notes
168	Loss	47–9–11 (101)	Ray Pelkey	KO	3 (4)	March 7, 1923	Auditorium, Oakland, California, U.S.	
167	Loss	47–8–11 (101)	Panama Joe Gans	TKO	4 (10)	July 24, 1922	Tomlinson Hall, Indianapolis, Illinois, U.S.	
166	Win	47–7–11 (101)	Bonecrusher McNally	KO	2 (10)	April 25, 1922	Elgin, Illinois, U.S.	
165	Win	46–7–11 (101)	Calvin Respress	NWS	10	April 7, 1922	Elgin, Illinois, U.S.	
164	Win	46–7–11 (100)	Young Jack Johnson	PTS	8	December 20, 1920	Grand Opera House, Boston, Massachusetts, U.S.	
163	Loss	45–7–11 (100)	Kid Norfolk	KO	4 (8)	June 22, 1920	Madison A.C., Philadelphia, Pennsylvania, U.S.	
162	Win	45–6–11 (100)	Smiling Kid Nolan	KO	2 (6)	January 27, 1920	Marble Hall, Biddeford, Maine, U.S.	
161	Win	44–6–11 (100)	Jimmy Lyggett Sr.	NWS	6	November 28, 1918	National A.C., Philadelphia, Pennsylvania, U.S.	
160	Win	44–6–11 (99)	Harry Baker	NWS	8	November 22, 1918	Penns Grove, New Jersey, U.S.	
159	Win	44–6–11 (98)	Larry Williams	NWS	8	September 20, 1918	Atlantic City, New Jersey, U.S.	
158	Win	44–6–11 (97)	Willie Langford	NWS	12	April 22, 1918	Palace Theatre, Toledo, Ohio, U.S.	
157	Win	44–6–11 (96)	Young Herman Miller	NWS	6	December 7, 1917	Cambria A.C., Philadelphia, Pennsylvania, U.S.	
156	Win	44–6–11 (95)	Henry Hauber	NWS	6	October 4, 1917	Broadway A.C., Philadelphia, Pennsylvania, U.S.	
155	Win	44–6–11 (94)	Joe Rosen	NWS	6	September 6, 1917	Broadway A.C., Philadelphia, Pennsylvania, U.S.	
154	Win	44–6–11 (93)	Pat O'Malley	NWS	6	August 13, 1917	Broadway A.C., Philadelphia, Pennsylvania, U.S.	
153	Win	44–6–11 (92)	Henry Hauber	NWS	6	July 16, 1917	Broadway A.C., Philadelphia, Pennsylvania, U.S.	
152	Win	44–6–11 (91)	Joe Borrell	NWS	6	June 15, 1917	Cambria A.C., Philadelphia, Pennsylvania, U.S.	
151	Loss	44–6–11 (90)	Larry Williams	NWS	6	May 31, 1917	Broadway A.C., Philadelphia, Pennsylvania, U.S.	
150	Win	44–6–11 (89)	Harry Baker	NWS	6	March 29, 1917	Broadway A.C., Philadelphia, Pennsylvania, U.S.	
149	Win	44–6–11 (88)	Henry Hauber	NWS	6	February 15, 1917	Broadway A.C., Philadelphia, Pennsylvania, U.S.	
148	Win	44–6–11 (87)	Harry Baker	NWS	6	February 1, 1917	Broadway A.C., Philadelphia, Pennsylvania, U.S.	
147	Win	44–6–11 (86)	Christy Williams	PTS	10	January 22, 1917	Columbus, Ohio, U.S.	
146	Loss	43–6–11 (86)	Jackie Clark	NWS	10	November 21, 1916	Grand Opera House, Pottstown, Pennsylvania, U.S.	
145	Loss	43–6–11 (85)	Eddie Revoire	NWS	6	November 17, 1916	Ryan A.C., Philadelphia, Pennsylvania, U.S.	
144	Loss	43–6–11 (84)	Joe Borrell	NWS	6	November 3, 1916	Nonpareil A.C., Philadelphia, Pennsylvania, U.S.	
143	Loss	43–6–11 (83)	Joe Borrell	NWS	6	October 20, 1916	Nonpareil A.C., Philadelphia, Pennsylvania, U.S.	
142	Loss	43–6–11 (82)	Eddie Revoire	NWS	6	October 17, 1916	Ryan A.C., Philadelphia, Pennsylvania, U.S.	
141	Draw	43–6–11 (81)	Young Ahearn	NWS	10	September 8, 1916	Harlem S.C., Manhattan, New York City, New York, U.S.	
140	Win	43–6–11 (80)	Young Ahearn	NWS	6	August 23, 1916	National A.C., Philadelphia, Pennsylvania, U.S.	
139	Win	43–6–11 (79)	George K O Samson	KO	2 (6)	June 28, 1916	Broadway A.C., Philadelphia, Pennsylvania, U.S.	
138	Win	42–6–11 (79)	Willie Baker	KO	4 (6)	June 20, 1916	Ryan A.C., Philadelphia, Pennsylvania, U.S.	
137	Win	41–6–11 (79)	Joe Rosen	NWS	6	June 12, 1916	Broadway A.C., Philadelphia, Pennsylvania, U.S.	
136	Win	41–6–11 (78)	One Round Sylvester	NWS	8	January 7, 1916	Saint Louis, Missouri, U.S.	
135	Win	41–6–11 (77)	One Round Sylvester	NWS	8	December 25, 1915	Future City A.C., Saint Louis, Missouri, U.S.	
134	Win	41–6–11 (76)	Jack Watts	TKO	9 (10)	September 6, 1915	Columbia Theater, Indianapolis, Indiana, U.S.	
133	Loss	40–6–11 (76)	Eddie Palmer	PTS	8	August 2, 1915	Memphis, Tennessee, U.S.	
132	Draw	40–5–11 (76)	Al Rogers	NWS	6	January 27, 1915	Mishler Theatre, Altoona, Pennsylvania, U.S.	
131	Loss	40–5–11 (75)	Harry Greb	NWS	6	January 25, 1915	Duquesne Garden, Pittsburgh, Pennsylvania, U.S.	
130	Loss	40–5–11 (74)	Harry Baker	NWS	6	January 19, 1915	Fairmont A.C., Philadelphia, Pennsylvania, U.S.	
129	Draw	40–5–11 (73)	Harry Baker	NWS	6	January 12, 1915	Mishler Theatre, Altoona, Pennsylvania, U.S.	
128	Draw	40–5–11 (72)	Al Grayber	NWS	6	December 16, 1914	Mishler Theatre, Altoona, Pennsylvania, U.S.	
127	Loss	40–5–11 (71)	Emmett 'Kid' Wagner	KO	4 (10)	October 29, 1914	Lyric Theatre, Allentown, Pennsylvania, U.S.	
126	Loss	40–4–11 (71)	Bill Watkins	KO	4 (10)	October 10, 1914	Broadway S.C., Brooklyn, New York City, New York, U.S.	
125	Loss	40–3–11 (71)	Young Tommy Coleman	NWS	6	October 5, 1914	Olympia A.C., Philadelphia, Pennsylvania, U.S.	
124	Loss	40–3–11 (70)	Jack McCarron	NWS	6	September 12, 1914	National A.C., Philadelphia, Pennsylvania, U.S.	
123	Loss	40–3–11 (69)	Gunboat Smith	NWS	6	May 20, 1914	National A.C., Philadelphia, Pennsylvania, U.S.	
122	Win	40–3–11 (68)	Tommy Howell	NWS	6	April 4, 1914	National A.C., Philadelphia, Pennsylvania, U.S.	
121	Win	40–3–11 (67)	Harry Mansfield	NWS	6	December 29, 1908	Douglas A.C., Philadelphia, Pennsylvania, U.S.	
120	Win	40–3–11 (66)	Jack Robinson	NWS	6	December 14, 1908	West End A.C., Philadelphia, Pennsylvania, U.S.	
119	Win	40–3–11 (65)	Jack Robinson	NWS	3	December 10, 1908	Broadway A.C., Philadelphia, Pennsylvania, U.S.	
118	Win	40–3–11 (64)	Mickey McDonough	NWS	3	December 10, 1908	Broadway A.C., Philadelphia, Pennsylvania, U.S.	
117	Win	40–3–11 (63)	Professor Mike Donovan	NWS	6	November 23, 1908	Duquesne Garden, Pittsburgh, Pennsylvania, U.S.	
116	Win	40–3–11 (62)	George Memsic	NWS	6	November 7, 1908	National A.C., Philadelphia, Pennsylvania, U.S.	
115	NC	40–3–11 (61)	Cy Flynn	NC	6 (6)	September 30, 1908	Germania Hall, Rochester, New York, U.S.	Referee stopped the fight and declared the men were stalling
114	Win	40–3–11 (60)	John Willie	NWS	6	September 26, 1908	National A.C., Philadelphia, Pennsylvania, U.S.	
113	Win	40–3–11 (59)	Tony Caponi	NWS	6	September 14, 1908	West End A.C., Philadelphia, Pennsylvania, U.S.	
112	Win	40–3–11 (58)	George Gunther	NWS	6	June 18, 1908	Broadway A.C., Philadelphia, Pennsylvania, U.S.	
111	Loss	40–3–11 (57)	Philadelphia Jack O'Brien	NWS	6	June 10, 1908	National A.C., Philadelphia, Pennsylvania, U.S.	
110	Win	40–3–11 (56)	Steve Crosby	NWS	6	May 1, 1908	Ontario A.C., Philadelphia, Pennsylvania, U.S.	
109	Win	40–3–11 (55)	Mark Anderson	TKO	2 (6)	May 1, 1908	Ontario A.C., Philadelphia, Pennsylvania, U.S.	
108	Draw	39–3–11 (55)	Professor Mike Donovan	PTS	10	April 21, 1908	Abie Opera House, Easton, Pennsylvania, U.S.	
107	Win	39–3–10 (55)	Bill Heveron	TKO	3 (6)	April 13, 1908	West End A.C., Philadelphia, Pennsylvania, U.S.	
106	Win	38–3–10 (55)	Young Tommy Coleman	NWS	6	March 20, 1908	Ontario A.C., Philadelphia, Pennsylvania, U.S.	
105	Win	38–3–10 (54)	Terry Martin	NWS	6	March 14, 1908	National A.C., Philadelphia, Pennsylvania, U.S.	
104	Win	38–3–10 (53)	George Gunther	NWS	6	February 27, 1908	Broadway A.C., Philadelphia, Pennsylvania, U.S.	
103	Win	38–3–10 (52)	Charley Hitte	TKO	14 (20)	January 21, 1908	Albany, New York, U.S.	
102	Win	37–3–10 (52)	Jack Bonner	NWS	6	January 17, 1908	Industrial A.C., Philadelphia, Pennsylvania, U.S.	
101	Draw	37–3–10 (51)	George Gunther	NWS	6	January 9, 1908	Broadway A.C., Philadelphia, Pennsylvania, U.S.	
100	Win	37–3–10 (50)	Professor Mike Donovan	NWS	10	December 24, 1907	Bijou Theater, Reading, Pennsylvania, U.S.	
99	Win	37–3–10 (49)	Jack Morgan	TKO	3 (6)	December 20, 1907	Industrial Hall, Philadelphia, Pennsylvania, U.S.	
98	Win	36–3–10 (49)	George Gunther	KO	5 (6)	December 6, 1907	Industrial Hall, Philadelphia, Pennsylvania, U.S.	
97	Win	35–3–10 (49)	Harry Lewis	NWS	6	November 20, 1907	National A.C., Philadelphia, Pennsylvania, U.S.	
96	Win	35–3–10 (48)	Professor Mike Donovan	NWS	6	October 18, 1907	Industrial Hall, Philadelphia, Pennsylvania, U.S.	
95	Loss	35–3–10 (47)	Jim Barry	PTS	6	September 5, 1907	Savoy A.C., Bridgeport, Connecticut, U.S.	
94	Win	35–2–10 (47)	Jim Barry	NWS	6	July 8, 1907	Washington S.C., Philadelphia, Pennsylvania, U.S.	
93	Win	35–2–10 (46)	Billy Burke	NWS	6	June 27, 1907	Broadway A.C., Philadelphia, Pennsylvania, U.S.	
92	Win	35–2–10 (45)	Terry Martin	NWS	6	June 17, 1907	Washington S.C., Philadelphia, Pennsylvania, U.S.	
91	Win	35–2–10 (44)	George Cole	NWS	6	June 7, 1907	New Penn Art A.C., Philadelphia, Pennsylvania, U.S.	
90	Win	35–2–10 (43)	Fred Bradley	KO	2 (6)	May 27, 1907	Washington S.C., Philadelphia, Pennsylvania, U.S.	
89	Draw	34–2–10 (43)	George Gunther	NWS	6	May 23, 1907	Broadway A.C., Philadelphia, Pennsylvania, U.S.	
88	Win	34–2–10 (42)	Herman Miller	KO	3 (6)	May 17, 1907	New Penn Art A.C., Philadelphia, Pennsylvania, U.S.	
87	Win	33–2–10 (42)	George Gunther	NWS	10	May 15, 1907	National S.C., Lyric Hall, Manhattan, New York City, New York, U.S.	
86	Win	33–2–10 (41)	George Gunther	NWS	6	April 18, 1907	Broadway A.C., Philadelphia, Pennsylvania, U.S.	
85	Win	33–2–10 (40)	Billy Burke	NWS	6	January 25, 1907	Spring Garden A.C., Philadelphia, Pennsylvania, U.S.	
84	Win	33–2–10 (39)	Kid Henry	NWS	6	January 24, 1907	Maennerchor Hall, Lancaster, Pennsylvania, U.S.	
83	Win	33–2–10 (38)	George Cole	NWS	6	January 1, 1907	National A.C., Philadelphia, Pennsylvania, U.S.	
82	Win	33–2–10 (37)	Eddie Haney	TKO	2 (6)	November 29, 1906	Broadway A.C., Philadelphia, Pennsylvania, U.S.	
81	Win	32–2–10 (37)	Ted Smith	NWS	10	November 6, 1906	Allentown, Pennsylvania, U.S.	
80	Win	32–2–10 (36)	Dave Holly	NWS	6	October 11, 1906	Broadway A.C., Philadelphia, Pennsylvania, U.S.	
79	Win	32–2–10 (35)	Billy Burke	TKO	3 (6)	August 23, 1906	Broadway A.C., Philadelphia, Pennsylvania, U.S.	
78	Win	31–2–10 (35)	Billy Burke	NWS	6	August 2, 1906	Broadway A.C., Philadelphia, Pennsylvania, U.S.	
77	Draw	31–2–10 (34)	George Gunther	NWS	6	July 5, 1906	Broadway A.C., Philadelphia, Pennsylvania, U.S.	
76	Loss	31–2–10 (33)	Joe Gans	NWS	6	June 29, 1906	National A.C., Philadelphia, Pennsylvania, U.S.	
75	Win	31–2–10 (32)	Kid Wilson	NWS	6	June 7, 1906	Broadway A.C., Philadelphia, Pennsylvania, U.S.	
74	Win	31–2–10 (31)	Sammy Campbell	NWS	4	May 11, 1906	Sharkey A.C., Manhattan, New York City, New York, U.S.	
73	Win	31–2–10 (30)	Sammy Campbell	NWS	4	May 4, 1906	Sharkey A.C., Manhattan, New York City, New York, U.S.	
72	Win	31–2–10 (29)	Cleve Hawkins	KO	2 (6)	May 1, 1906	20th Century A.C., Philadelphia, Pennsylvania, U.S.	
71	Win	30–2–10 (29)	Kid Wilson	PTS	8	March 20, 1906	Realty Hall, Indianapolis, Indiana, U.S.	
70	Win	29–2–10 (29)	Jack Williams	NWS	6	March 8, 1906	Broadway A.C., Philadelphia, Pennsylvania, U.S.	
69	Win	29–2–10 (28)	George Gunther	NWS	6	February 7, 1906	18th Regiment Armory, Pittsburgh, Pennsylvania, U.S.	
68	Win	29–2–10 (27)	George Gunther	NWS	10	January 31, 1906	New Castle, Pennsylvania, U.S.	
67	Win	29–2–10 (26)	Pat O'Rourke	NWS	3	January 19, 1906	Sharkey A.C., Manhattan, New York City, New York, U.S.	
66	Win	29–2–10 (25)	Sailor Burke	NWS	3	January 1, 1906	Sharkey A.C., Manhattan, New York City, New York, U.S.	
65	Draw	29–2–10 (24)	Larry Temple	PTS	15	October 13, 1905	Marlborough Theater, Marlborough, Massachusetts, U.S.	Stipulation of a draw if both lasted the distance
64	NC	29–2–9 (24)	Sam Langford	NC	1 (6)	October 7, 1905	National A.C., Philadelphia, Pennsylvania, U.S.	It quickly became evident that the fighters had agreed to participate only if the fight was faked
63	Win	29–2–9 (23)	Harry Senter	PTS	6	October 4, 1905	National S.C., Wilmington, Delaware, U.S.	
62	Draw	28–2–9 (23)	Jack Williams	NWS	6	October 4, 1905	Broadway A.C., Philadelphia, Pennsylvania, U.S.	
61	Draw	28–2–9 (22)	Sam Langford	PTS	10	September 20, 1905	Lyric A.C., Allentown, Pennsylvania, U.S.	
60	Draw	28–2–8 (22)	Larry Temple	PTS	12	September 4, 1905	Sharon, Pennsylvania, U.S.	
59	Loss	28–2–7 (22)	Sam Langford	PTS	15	August 18, 1905	Leiperville, Pennsylvania, U.S.	
58	Win	28–1–7 (22)	Jack Williams	NWS	6	August 10, 1905	Broadway A.C., Philadelphia, Pennsylvania, U.S.	
57	Loss	28–1–7 (21)	George Cole	NWS	6	June 10, 1905	National A.C., Philadelphia, Pennsylvania, U.S.	
56	Win	28–1–7 (20)	Joe Allen	KO	1 (6)	April 22, 1905	Manayunk A.C., Philadelphia, Pennsylvania, U.S.	
55	Win	27–1–7 (20)	Dick Fitzpatrick	KO	2 (12)	April 3, 1905	Sharon, Pennsylvania, U.S.	
54	Win	26–1–7 (20)	Cy Flynn	PTS	12	February 27, 1905	Nonpareil A.C., Sharon, Pennsylvania, U.S.	
53	Win	25–1–7 (20)	Ed Smith	PTS	10	February 21, 1905	Allentown, Pennsylvania, U.S.	
52	Win	24–1–7 (20)	Kid Wilson	NWS	6	February 17, 1905	Altoona, Pennsylvania, U.S.	
51	Win	24–1–7 (19)	Kid Ferry	KO	7 (10)	January 31, 1905	Allentown, Pennsylvania, U.S.	
50	Win	23–1–7 (19)	Charley Mulhall	PTS	10	January 19, 1905	Tamaqua, Pennsylvania, U.S.	
49	Win	22–1–7 (19)	Joe Grim	NWS	6	January 12, 1905	Marlborough Theater, Marlborough, Massachusetts, U.S.	
48	Draw	22–1–7 (18)	Sam Langford	PTS	15	December 9, 1904	Marlborough Theater, Marlborough, Massachusetts, U.S.	
47	Win	22–1–6 (18)	Sam Bolen	NWS	6	December 3, 1904	National A.C., Philadelphia, Pennsylvania, U.S.	
46	Win	22–1–6 (17)	Joe Grim	NWS	6	December 1, 1904	Broadway A.C., Philadelphia, Pennsylvania, U.S.	
45	Win	22–1–6 (16)	Joe Grim	NWS	6	November 3, 1904	Broadway A.C., Philadelphia, Pennsylvania, U.S.	
44	Win	22–1–6 (15)	Charley Hitte	TKO	3 (6)	September 23, 1904	Manhattan A.C., Philadelphia, Pennsylvania, U.S.	
43	Win	21–1–6 (15)	Blink McCloskey	NWS	6	September 14, 1904	Broadway A.C., Philadelphia, Pennsylvania, U.S.	
42	Win	21–1–6 (14)	Dave Holly	NWS	6	August 26, 1904	Manhattan A.C., Philadelphia, Pennsylvania, U.S.	
41	Win	21–1–6 (13)	Harry Lenny	TKO	5 (6)	July 18, 1904	National A.C., Philadelphia, Pennsylvania, U.S.	
40	Win	20–1–6 (13)	Kid Ferry	KO	8 (10)	April 5, 1904	Allentown, Pennsylvania, U.S.	
39	Loss	19–1–6 (13)	Joe Gans	PTS	15	March 25, 1904	Germania Maennerchor Hall, Baltimore, Maryland, U.S.	
38	NC	19–0–6 (13)	Danny Duane	NC	2 (15)	March 1, 1904	Weimer Auditorium, Lebanon, Pennsylvania, U.S.	Down from a low blow, Blackburn was hit a number of times by Duane while on the canvas
37	Win	19–0–6 (12)	Kid Wilson	NWS	6	January 25, 1904	Broadway A.C., Chester, Pennsylvania, U.S.	
36	Win	19–0–6 (11)	Charley Mulhall	NWS	6	January 19, 1904	Tamaqua, Pennsylvania, U.S.	
35	Draw	19–0–6 (10)	Sam Langford	NWS	6	January 11, 1904	Washington S.C., Philadelphia, Pennsylvania, U.S.	
34	Draw	19–0–6 (9)	Sam Bolen	PTS	15	January 8, 1904	Shlegel's Hall, Baltimore, Maryland, U.S.	
33	Win	19–0–5 (9)	Jimmy Gardner	PTS	12	January 2, 1904	Central A.C., Boston, Massachusetts, U.S.	
32	Draw	18–0–5 (9)	Mike "Twin" Sullivan	PTS	15	December 31, 1903	Chelsea A.C., Chelsea, Massachusetts, U.S.	
31	Draw	18–0–4 (9)	Sam Langford	PTS	12	December 23, 1903	Central A.C., Boston, Massachusetts, U.S.	
30	Loss	18–0–3 (9)	Dave Holly	NWS	6	November 21, 1903	National A.C., Philadelphia, Pennsylvania, U.S.	
29	Win	18–0–3 (8)	Joe Gans	NWS	6	November 2, 1903	Washington S.C., Philadelphia, Pennsylvania, U.S.	
28	Win	18–0–3 (7)	Eddie Kennedy	NWS	6	October 12, 1903	Washington S.C., Philadelphia, Pennsylvania, U.S.	
27	Win	18–0–3 (6)	Tommy Daly	KO	3 (6)	September 25, 1903	State A.C., Philadelphia, Pennsylvania, U.S.	
26	NC	17–0–3 (6)	Tommy Cleary	NC	1 (6)	September 25, 1903	State A.C., Philadelphia, Pennsylvania, U.S.	Blackburn accidentally hit Tom Cleary low and Tom Daly took Cleary's place
25	Win	17–0–3 (5)	Vernon Campbell	TKO	4 (6)	September 18, 1903	State A.C., Philadelphia, Pennsylvania, U.S.	
24	Win	16–0–3 (5)	Tommy Wild	TKO	2 (6)	September 15, 1903	Southern A.C., Philadelphia, Pennsylvania, U.S.	
23	Win	15–0–3 (5)	Howard Wilson	NWS	6	September 1, 1903	Southern A.C., Philadelphia, Pennsylvania, U.S.	
22	Win	15–0–3 (4)	Kid Terrell	TKO	4 (6)	July 3, 1903	Central A.C., Philadelphia, Pennsylvania, U.S.	
21	Draw	14–0–3 (4)	Jack "Twin" Sullivan	NWS	6	June 19, 1903	Ariel A.C., Philadelphia, Pennsylvania, U.S.	
20	Win	14–0–3 (3)	Joe Uvanni	TKO	6 (6)	June 13, 1903	Southern A.C., Philadelphia, Pennsylvania, U.S.	
19	Win	13–0–3 (3)	Jack McKenzie	NWS	6	May 5, 1903	Penn Art Club, Philadelphia, Pennsylvania, U.S.	
18	Draw	13–0–3 (2)	Dave Holly	NWS	6	May 4, 1903	Washington S.C., Philadelphia, Pennsylvania, U.S.	
17	Win	13–0–3 (1)	Charles McDonald	KO	3 (6)	March 9, 1903	Masonic Hall, Pittsburgh, Pennsylvania, U.S.	
16	Win	12–0–3 (1)	James Frazier	PTS	6	March 2, 1903	Masonic Hall, Pittsburgh, Pennsylvania, U.S.	
15	Win	11–0–3 (1)	Kid Reynolds	KO	2 (?)	February 23, 1903	Masonic Hall, Allegheny, Pennsylvania, U.S.	
14	Win	10–0–3 (1)	Eddie Gardner	TKO	10 (15)	December 15, 1902	Casino Theatre, Terre Haute, Indiana, U.S.	
13	Win	9–0–3 (1)	Otis Southers	KO	2 (?)	December 1, 1902	Terre Haute, Indiana, U.S.	
12	Win	8–0–3 (1)	Bob Fanning	PTS	10	August 14, 1902	Columbia theatre, Frankfort, Indiana, U.S.	
11	Win	7–0–3 (1)	Bob Fanning	PTS	10	August 7, 1902	Columbia theatre, Frankfort, Indiana, U.S.	
10	Draw	6–0–3 (1)	Jack Cullen	PTS	10	May 5, 1902	Empire Theater, Indianapolis, Indiana, U.S.	
9	Draw	6–0–2 (1)	Steve Crosby	PTS	10	April 10, 1902	Cleveland Club, Indianapolis, Indiana, U.S.	
8	Win	6–0–1 (1)	Kid Stevens	KO	2 (?)	March 6, 1902	Odd Fellows Hall, Indianapolis, Indiana, U.S.	
7	ND	5–0–1 (1)	Eugene Bezenah	ND	?	December 16, 1901	Indianapolis, Indiana, U.S.	
6	Win	5–0–1	Jim Glasgow	KO	2 (6)	November 19, 1901	Columbia Club, Indianapolis, Indiana, U.S.	
5	Draw	4–0–1	Jack Cullen	PTS	10	May 11, 1901	Empire Theater, Indianapolis, Indiana, U.S.	
4	Win	4–0	William Love	KO	2 (?)	April 25, 1901	Alexandria A.C., Alexandria, Indiana, U.S.	
3	Win	3–0	John Dean	PTS	4	February 21, 1901	Alexandria A.C., Alexandria, Indiana, U.S.	
2	Win	2–0	Joe Trevan	PTS	4	December 27, 1900	Odd Fellows Hall, Indianapolis, Indiana, U.S.	
1	Win	1–0	Albert Bean	KO	7 (?)	April 29, 1900	Alexandria A.C., Alexandria, Indiana, U.S.	

=== Unofficial record ===
168 fights	117 wins	24 losses
By knockout	34	5
By decision	83	19
Draws	22	
No contests	5	

Record with the inclusion of newspaper decisions in the win/loss/draw column.

No.	Result	Record	Opponent	Type	Round	Date	Location	Notes
168	Loss	117–24–22 (5)	Ray Pelkey	KO	3 (4)	March 7, 1923	Auditorium, Oakland, California, U.S.	
167	Loss	117–23–22 (5)	Panama Joe Gans	TKO	4 (10)	July 24, 1922	Tomlinson Hall, Indianapolis, Illinois, U.S.	
166	Win	117–22–22 (5)	Bonecrusher McNally	KO	2 (10)	April 25, 1922	Elgin, Illinois, U.S.	
165	Win	116–22–22 (5)	Calvin Respress	NWS	10	April 7, 1922	Elgin, Illinois, U.S.	
164	Win	115–22–22 (5)	Young Jack Johnson	PTS	8	December 20, 1920	Grand Opera House, Boston, Massachusetts, U.S.	
163	Loss	114–22–22 (5)	Kid Norfolk	KO	4 (8)	June 22, 1920	Madison A.C., Philadelphia, Pennsylvania, U.S.	
162	Win	114–21–22 (5)	Smiling Kid Nolan	KO	2 (6)	January 27, 1920	Marble Hall, Biddeford, Maine, U.S.	
161	Win	113–21–22 (5)	Jimmy Lyggett Sr.	NWS	6	November 28, 1918	National A.C., Philadelphia, Pennsylvania, U.S.	
160	Win	112–21–22 (5)	Harry Baker	NWS	8	November 22, 1918	Penns Grove, New Jersey, U.S.	
159	Win	111–21–22 (5)	Larry Williams	NWS	8	September 20, 1918	Atlantic City, New Jersey, U.S.	
158	Win	110–21–22 (5)	Willie Langford	NWS	12	April 22, 1918	Palace Theatre, Toledo, Ohio, U.S.	
157	Win	109–21–22 (5)	Young Herman Miller	NWS	6	December 7, 1917	Cambria A.C., Philadelphia, Pennsylvania, U.S.	
156	Win	108–21–22 (5)	Henry Hauber	NWS	6	October 4, 1917	Broadway A.C., Philadelphia, Pennsylvania, U.S.	
155	Win	107–21–22 (5)	Joe Rosen	NWS	6	September 6, 1917	Broadway A.C., Philadelphia, Pennsylvania, U.S.	
154	Win	106–21–22 (5)	Pat O'Malley	NWS	6	August 13, 1917	Broadway A.C., Philadelphia, Pennsylvania, U.S.	
153	Win	105–21–22 (5)	Henry Hauber	NWS	6	July 16, 1917	Broadway A.C., Philadelphia, Pennsylvania, U.S.	
152	Win	104–21–22 (5)	Joe Borrell	NWS	6	June 15, 1917	Cambria A.C., Philadelphia, Pennsylvania, U.S.	
151	Loss	103–21–22 (5)	Larry Williams	NWS	6	May 31, 1917	Broadway A.C., Philadelphia, Pennsylvania, U.S.	
150	Win	103–20–22 (5)	Harry Baker	NWS	6	March 29, 1917	Broadway A.C., Philadelphia, Pennsylvania, U.S.	
149	Win	102–20–22 (5)	Henry Hauber	NWS	6	February 15, 1917	Broadway A.C., Philadelphia, Pennsylvania, U.S.	
148	Win	101–20–22 (5)	Harry Baker	NWS	6	February 1, 1917	Broadway A.C., Philadelphia, Pennsylvania, U.S.	
147	Win	100–20–22 (5)	Christy Williams	PTS	10	January 22, 1917	Columbus, Ohio, U.S.	
146	Loss	99–20–22 (5)	Jackie Clark	NWS	10	November 21, 1916	Grand Opera House, Pottstown, Pennsylvania, U.S.	
145	Loss	99–19–22 (5)	Eddie Revoire	NWS	6	November 17, 1916	Ryan A.C., Philadelphia, Pennsylvania, U.S.	
144	Loss	99–18–22 (5)	Joe Borrell	NWS	6	November 3, 1916	Nonpareil A.C., Philadelphia, Pennsylvania, U.S.	
143	Loss	99–17–22 (5)	Joe Borrell	NWS	6	October 20, 1916	Nonpareil A.C., Philadelphia, Pennsylvania, U.S.	
142	Loss	99–16–22 (5)	Eddie Revoire	NWS	6	October 17, 1916	Ryan A.C., Philadelphia, Pennsylvania, U.S.	
141	Draw	99–15–22 (5)	Young Ahearn	NWS	10	September 8, 1916	Harlem S.C., Manhattan, New York City, New York, U.S.	
140	Win	99–15–21 (5)	Young Ahearn	NWS	6	August 23, 1916	National A.C., Philadelphia, Pennsylvania, U.S.	
139	Win	98–15–21 (5)	George K O Samson	KO	2 (6)	June 28, 1916	Broadway A.C., Philadelphia, Pennsylvania, U.S.	
138	Win	97–15–21 (5)	Willie Baker	KO	4 (6)	June 20, 1916	Ryan A.C., Philadelphia, Pennsylvania, U.S.	
137	Win	96–15–21 (5)	Joe Rosen	NWS	6	June 12, 1916	Broadway A.C., Philadelphia, Pennsylvania, U.S.	
136	Win	95–15–21 (5)	One Round Sylvester	NWS	8	January 7, 1916	Saint Louis, Missouri, U.S.	
135	Win	94–15–21 (5)	One Round Sylvester	NWS	8	December 25, 1915	Future City A.C., Saint Louis, Missouri, U.S.	
134	Win	93–15–21 (5)	Jack Watts	TKO	9 (10)	September 6, 1915	Columbia Theater, Indianapolis, Indiana, U.S.	
133	Loss	92–15–21 (5)	Eddie Palmer	PTS	8	August 2, 1915	Memphis, Tennessee, U.S.	
132	Draw	92–14–21 (5)	Al Rogers	NWS	6	January 27, 1915	Mishler Theatre, Altoona, Pennsylvania, U.S.	
131	Loss	92–14–20 (5)	Harry Greb	NWS	6	January 25, 1915	Duquesne Garden, Pittsburgh, Pennsylvania, U.S.	
130	Loss	92–13–20 (5)	Harry Baker	NWS	6	January 19, 1915	Fairmont A.C., Philadelphia, Pennsylvania, U.S.	
129	Draw	92–12–20 (5)	Harry Baker	NWS	6	January 12, 1915	Mishler Theatre, Altoona, Pennsylvania, U.S.	
128	Draw	92–12–19 (5)	Al Grayber	NWS	6	December 16, 1914	Mishler Theatre, Altoona, Pennsylvania, U.S.	
127	Loss	92–12–18 (5)	Emmett 'Kid' Wagner	KO	4 (10)	October 29, 1914	Lyric Theatre, Allentown, Pennsylvania, U.S.	
126	Loss	92–11–18 (5)	Bill Watkins	KO	4 (10)	October 10, 1914	Broadway S.C., Brooklyn, New York City, New York, U.S.	
125	Loss	92–10–18 (5)	Young Tommy Coleman	NWS	6	October 5, 1914	Olympia A.C., Philadelphia, Pennsylvania, U.S.	
124	Loss	92–9–18 (5)	Jack McCarron	NWS	6	September 12, 1914	National A.C., Philadelphia, Pennsylvania, U.S.	
123	Loss	92–8–18 (5)	Gunboat Smith	NWS	6	May 20, 1914	National A.C., Philadelphia, Pennsylvania, U.S.	
122	Win	92–7–18 (5)	Tommy Howell	NWS	6	April 4, 1914	National A.C., Philadelphia, Pennsylvania, U.S.	
121	Win	91–7–18 (5)	Harry Mansfield	NWS	6	December 29, 1908	Douglas A.C., Philadelphia, Pennsylvania, U.S.	
120	Win	90–7–18 (5)	Jack Robinson	NWS	6	December 14, 1908	West End A.C., Philadelphia, Pennsylvania, U.S.	
119	Win	89–7–18 (5)	Jack Robinson	NWS	3	December 10, 1908	Broadway A.C., Philadelphia, Pennsylvania, U.S.	
118	Win	88–7–18 (5)	Mickey McDonough	NWS	3	December 10, 1908	Broadway A.C., Philadelphia, Pennsylvania, U.S.	
117	Win	87–7–18 (5)	Professor Mike Donovan	NWS	6	November 23, 1908	Duquesne Garden, Pittsburgh, Pennsylvania, U.S.	
116	Win	86–7–18 (5)	George Memsic	NWS	6	November 7, 1908	National A.C., Philadelphia, Pennsylvania, U.S.	
115	NC	85–7–18 (5)	Cy Flynn	NC	6 (6)	September 30, 1908	Germania Hall, Rochester, New York, U.S.	Referee stopped the fight and declared the men were stalling
114	Win	85–7–18 (4)	John Willie	NWS	6	September 26, 1908	National A.C., Philadelphia, Pennsylvania, U.S.	
113	Win	84–7–18 (4)	Tony Caponi	NWS	6	September 14, 1908	West End A.C., Philadelphia, Pennsylvania, U.S.	
112	Win	83–7–18 (4)	George Gunther	NWS	6	June 18, 1908	Broadway A.C., Philadelphia, Pennsylvania, U.S.	
111	Loss	82–7–18 (4)	Philadelphia Jack O'Brien	NWS	6	June 10, 1908	National A.C., Philadelphia, Pennsylvania, U.S.	
110	Win	82–6–18 (4)	Steve Crosby	NWS	6	May 1, 1908	Ontario A.C., Philadelphia, Pennsylvania, U.S.	
109	Win	81–6–18 (4)	Mark Anderson	TKO	2 (6)	May 1, 1908	Ontario A.C., Philadelphia, Pennsylvania, U.S.	
108	Draw	80–6–18 (4)	Professor Mike Donovan	PTS	10	April 21, 1908	Abie Opera House, Easton, Pennsylvania, U.S.	
107	Win	80–6–17 (4)	Bill Heveron	TKO	3 (6)	April 13, 1908	West End A.C., Philadelphia, Pennsylvania, U.S.	
106	Win	79–6–17 (4)	Young Tommy Coleman	NWS	6	March 20, 1908	Ontario A.C., Philadelphia, Pennsylvania, U.S.	
105	Win	78–6–17 (4)	Terry Martin	NWS	6	March 14, 1908	National A.C., Philadelphia, Pennsylvania, U.S.	
104	Win	77–6–17 (4)	George Gunther	NWS	6	February 27, 1908	Broadway A.C., Philadelphia, Pennsylvania, U.S.	
103	Win	76–6–17 (4)	Charley Hitte	TKO	14 (20)	January 21, 1908	Albany, New York, U.S.	
102	Win	75–6–17 (4)	Jack Bonner	NWS	6	January 17, 1908	Industrial A.C., Philadelphia, Pennsylvania, U.S.	
101	Draw	74–6–17 (4)	George Gunther	NWS	6	January 9, 1908	Broadway A.C., Philadelphia, Pennsylvania, U.S.	
100	Win	74–6–16 (4)	Professor Mike Donovan	NWS	10	December 24, 1907	Bijou Theater, Reading, Pennsylvania, U.S.	
99	Win	73–6–16 (4)	Jack Morgan	TKO	3 (6)	December 20, 1907	Industrial Hall, Philadelphia, Pennsylvania, U.S.	
98	Win	72–6–16 (4)	George Gunther	KO	5 (6)	December 6, 1907	Industrial Hall, Philadelphia, Pennsylvania, U.S.	
97	Win	71–6–16 (4)	Harry Lewis	NWS	6	November 20, 1907	National A.C., Philadelphia, Pennsylvania, U.S.	
96	Win	70–6–16 (4)	Professor Mike Donovan	NWS	6	October 18, 1907	Industrial Hall, Philadelphia, Pennsylvania, U.S.	
95	Loss	69–6–16 (4)	Jim Barry	PTS	6	September 5, 1907	Savoy A.C., Bridgeport, Connecticut, U.S.	
94	Win	69–5–16 (4)	Jim Barry	NWS	6	July 8, 1907	Washington S.C., Philadelphia, Pennsylvania, U.S.	
93	Win	68–5–16 (4)	Billy Burke	NWS	6	June 27, 1907	Broadway A.C., Philadelphia, Pennsylvania, U.S.	
92	Win	67–5–16 (4)	Terry Martin	NWS	6	June 17, 1907	Washington S.C., Philadelphia, Pennsylvania, U.S.	
91	Win	66–5–16 (4)	George Cole	NWS	6	June 7, 1907	New Penn Art A.C., Philadelphia, Pennsylvania, U.S.	
90	Win	65–5–16 (4)	Fred Bradley	KO	2 (6)	May 27, 1907	Washington S.C., Philadelphia, Pennsylvania, U.S.	
89	Draw	64–5–16 (4)	George Gunther	NWS	6	May 23, 1907	Broadway A.C., Philadelphia, Pennsylvania, U.S.	
88	Win	64–5–15 (4)	Herman Miller	KO	3 (6)	May 17, 1907	New Penn Art A.C., Philadelphia, Pennsylvania, U.S.	
87	Win	63–5–15 (4)	George Gunther	NWS	10	May 15, 1907	National S.C., Lyric Hall, Manhattan, New York City, New York, U.S.	
86	Win	62–5–15 (4)	George Gunther	NWS	6	April 18, 1907	Broadway A.C., Philadelphia, Pennsylvania, U.S.	
85	Win	61–5–15 (4)	Billy Burke	NWS	6	January 25, 1907	Spring Garden A.C., Philadelphia, Pennsylvania, U.S.	
84	Win	60–5–15 (4)	Kid Henry	NWS	6	January 24, 1907	Maennerchor Hall, Lancaster, Pennsylvania, U.S.	
83	Win	59–5–15 (4)	George Cole	NWS	6	January 1, 1907	National A.C., Philadelphia, Pennsylvania, U.S.	
82	Win	58–5–15 (4)	Eddie Haney	TKO	2 (6)	November 29, 1906	Broadway A.C., Philadelphia, Pennsylvania, U.S.	
81	Win	57–5–15 (4)	Ted Smith	NWS	10	November 6, 1906	Allentown, Pennsylvania, U.S.	
80	Win	56–5–15 (4)	Dave Holly	NWS	6	October 11, 1906	Broadway A.C., Philadelphia, Pennsylvania, U.S.	
79	Win	55–5–15 (4)	Billy Burke	TKO	3 (6)	August 23, 1906	Broadway A.C., Philadelphia, Pennsylvania, U.S.	
78	Win	54–5–15 (4)	Billy Burke	NWS	6	August 2, 1906	Broadway A.C., Philadelphia, Pennsylvania, U.S.	
77	Draw	53–5–15 (4)	George Gunther	NWS	6	July 5, 1906	Broadway A.C., Philadelphia, Pennsylvania, U.S.	
76	Loss	53–5–14 (4)	Joe Gans	NWS	6	June 29, 1906	National A.C., Philadelphia, Pennsylvania, U.S.	
75	Win	53–4–14 (4)	Kid Wilson	NWS	6	June 7, 1906	Broadway A.C., Philadelphia, Pennsylvania, U.S.	
74	Win	52–4–14 (4)	Sammy Campbell	NWS	4	May 11, 1906	Sharkey A.C., Manhattan, New York City, New York, U.S.	
73	Win	51–4–14 (4)	Sammy Campbell	NWS	4	May 4, 1906	Sharkey A.C., Manhattan, New York City, New York, U.S.	
72	Win	50–4–14 (4)	Cleve Hawkins	KO	2 (6)	May 1, 1906	20th Century A.C., Philadelphia, Pennsylvania, U.S.	
71	Win	49–4–14 (4)	Kid Wilson	PTS	8	March 20, 1906	Realty Hall, Indianapolis, Indiana, U.S.	
70	Win	48–4–14 (4)	Jack Williams	NWS	6	March 8, 1906	Broadway A.C., Philadelphia, Pennsylvania, U.S.	
69	Win	47–4–14 (4)	George Gunther	NWS	6	February 7, 1906	18th Regiment Armory, Pittsburgh, Pennsylvania, U.S.	
68	Win	46–4–14 (4)	George Gunther	NWS	10	January 31, 1906	New Castle, Pennsylvania, U.S.	
67	Win	45–4–14 (4)	Pat O'Rourke	NWS	3	January 19, 1906	Sharkey A.C., Manhattan, New York City, New York, U.S.	
66	Win	44–4–14 (4)	Sailor Burke	NWS	3	January 1, 1906	Sharkey A.C., Manhattan, New York City, New York, U.S.	
65	Draw	43–4–14 (4)	Larry Temple	PTS	15	October 13, 1905	Marlborough Theater, Marlborough, Massachusetts, U.S.	Stipulation of a draw if both lasted the distance
64	NC	43–4–13 (4)	Sam Langford	NC	1 (6)	October 7, 1905	National A.C., Philadelphia, Pennsylvania, U.S.	It quickly evident that the fighters had agreed to participate only if the fight was faked
63	Win	43–4–13 (3)	Harry Senter	PTS	6	October 4, 1905	National S.C., Wilmington, Delaware, U.S.	
62	Draw	42–4–13 (3)	Jack Williams	NWS	6	October 4, 1905	Broadway A.C., Philadelphia, Pennsylvania, U.S.	
61	Draw	42–4–12 (3)	Sam Langford	PTS	10	September 20, 1905	Lyric A.C., Allentown, Pennsylvania, U.S.	
60	Draw	42–4–11 (3)	Larry Temple	PTS	12	September 4, 1905	Sharon, Pennsylvania, U.S.	
59	Loss	42–4–10 (3)	Sam Langford	PTS	15	August 18, 1905	Leiperville, Pennsylvania, U.S.	
58	Win	42–3–10 (3)	Jack Williams	NWS	6	August 10, 1905	Broadway A.C., Philadelphia, Pennsylvania, U.S.	
57	Loss	41–3–10 (3)	George Cole	NWS	6	June 10, 1905	National A.C., Philadelphia, Pennsylvania, U.S.	
56	Win	41–2–10 (3)	Joe Allen	KO	1 (6)	April 22, 1905	Manayunk A.C., Philadelphia, Pennsylvania, U.S.	
55	Win	40–2–10 (3)	Dick Fitzpatrick	KO	2 (12)	April 3, 1905	Sharon, Pennsylvania, U.S.	
54	Win	39–2–10 (3)	Cy Flynn	PTS	12	February 27, 1905	Nonpareil A.C., Sharon, Pennsylvania, U.S.	
53	Win	38–2–10 (3)	Ed Smith	PTS	10	February 21, 1905	Allentown, Pennsylvania, U.S.	
52	Win	37–2–10 (3)	Kid Wilson	NWS	6	February 17, 1905	Altoona, Pennsylvania, U.S.	
51	Win	36–2–10 (3)	Kid Ferry	KO	7 (10)	January 31, 1905	Allentown, Pennsylvania, U.S.	
50	Win	35–2–10 (3)	Charley Mulhall	PTS	10	January 19, 1905	Tamaqua, Pennsylvania, U.S.	
49	Win	34–2–10 (3)	Joe Grim	NWS	6	January 12, 1905	Marlborough Theater, Marlborough, Massachusetts, U.S.	
48	Draw	33–2–10 (3)	Sam Langford	PTS	15	December 9, 1904	Marlborough Theater, Marlborough, Massachusetts, U.S.	
47	Win	33–2–9 (3)	Sam Bolen	NWS	6	December 3, 1904	National A.C., Philadelphia, Pennsylvania, U.S.	
46	Win	32–2–9 (3)	Joe Grim	NWS	6	December 1, 1904	Broadway A.C., Philadelphia, Pennsylvania, U.S.	
45	Win	31–2–9 (3)	Joe Grim	NWS	6	November 3, 1904	Broadway A.C., Philadelphia, Pennsylvania, U.S.	
44	Win	30–2–9 (3)	Charley Hitte	TKO	3 (6)	September 23, 1904	Manhattan A.C., Philadelphia, Pennsylvania, U.S.	
43	Win	29–2–9 (3)	Blink McCloskey	NWS	6	September 14, 1904	Broadway A.C., Philadelphia, Pennsylvania, U.S.	
42	Win	28–2–9 (3)	Dave Holly	NWS	6	August 26, 1904	Manhattan A.C., Philadelphia, Pennsylvania, U.S.	
41	Win	27–2–9 (3)	Harry Lenny	TKO	5 (6)	July 18, 1904	National A.C., Philadelphia, Pennsylvania, U.S.	
40	Win	26–2–9 (3)	Kid Ferry	KO	8 (10)	April 5, 1904	Allentown, Pennsylvania, U.S.	
39	Loss	25–2–9 (3)	Joe Gans	PTS	15	March 25, 1904	Germania Maennerchor Hall, Baltimore, Maryland, U.S.	
38	NC	25–1–9 (3)	Danny Duane	NC	2 (15)	March 1, 1904	Weimer Auditorium, Lebanon, Pennsylvania, U.S.	Down from a low blow, Blackburn was hit a number of times by Duane while on the canvas
37	Win	25–1–9 (2)	Kid Wilson	NWS	6	January 25, 1904	Broadway A.C., Chester, Pennsylvania, U.S.	
36	Win	24–1–9 (2)	Charley Mulhall	NWS	6	January 19, 1904	Tamaqua, Pennsylvania, U.S.	
35	Draw	23–1–9 (2)	Sam Langford	NWS	6	January 11, 1904	Washington S.C., Philadelphia, Pennsylvania, U.S.	
34	Draw	23–1–8 (2)	Sam Bolen	PTS	15	January 8, 1904	Shlegel's Hall, Baltimore, Maryland, U.S.	
33	Win	23–1–7 (2)	Jimmy Gardner	PTS	12	January 2, 1904	Central A.C., Boston, Massachusetts, U.S.	
32	Draw	22–1–7 (2)	Mike "Twin" Sullivan	PTS	15	December 31, 1903	Chelsea A.C., Chelsea, Massachusetts, U.S.	
31	Draw	22–1–6 (2)	Sam Langford	PTS	12	December 23, 1903	Central A.C., Boston, Massachusetts, U.S.	
30	Loss	22–1–5 (2)	Dave Holly	NWS	6	November 21, 1903	National A.C., Philadelphia, Pennsylvania, U.S.	
29	Win	22–0–5 (2)	Joe Gans	NWS	6	November 2, 1903	Washington S.C., Philadelphia, Pennsylvania, U.S.	
28	Win	21–0–5 (2)	Eddie Kennedy	NWS	6	October 12, 1903	Washington S.C., Philadelphia, Pennsylvania, U.S.	
27	Win	20–0–5 (2)	Tommy Daly	KO	3 (6)	September 25, 1903	State A.C., Philadelphia, Pennsylvania, U.S.	
26	NC	19–0–5 (2)	Tommy Cleary	NC	1 (6)	September 25, 1903	State A.C., Philadelphia, Pennsylvania, U.S.	Blackburn accidentally hit Tom Cleary low and Tom Daly took Cleary's place
25	Win	19–0–5 (1)	Vernon Campbell	TKO	4 (6)	September 18, 1903	State A.C., Philadelphia, Pennsylvania, U.S.	
24	Win	18–0–5 (1)	Tommy Wild	TKO	2 (6)	September 15, 1903	Southern A.C., Philadelphia, Pennsylvania, U.S.	
23	Win	17–0–5 (1)	Howard Wilson	NWS	6	September 1, 1903	Southern A.C., Philadelphia, Pennsylvania, U.S.	
22	Win	16–0–5 (1)	Kid Terrell	TKO	4 (6)	July 3, 1903	Central A.C., Philadelphia, Pennsylvania, U.S.	
21	Draw	15–0–5 (1)	Jack "Twin" Sullivan	NWS	6	June 19, 1903	Ariel A.C., Philadelphia, Pennsylvania, U.S.	
20	Win	15–0–4 (1)	Joe Uvanni	TKO	6 (6)	June 13, 1903	Southern A.C., Philadelphia, Pennsylvania, U.S.	
19	Win	14–0–4 (1)	Jack McKenzie	NWS	6	May 5, 1903	Penn Art Club, Philadelphia, Pennsylvania, U.S.	
18	Draw	13–0–4 (1)	Dave Holly	NWS	6	May 4, 1903	Washington S.C., Philadelphia, Pennsylvania, U.S.	
17	Win	13–0–3 (1)	Charles McDonald	KO	3 (6)	March 9, 1903	Masonic Hall, Pittsburgh, Pennsylvania, U.S.	
16	Win	12–0–3 (1)	James Frazier	PTS	6	March 2, 1903	Masonic Hall, Pittsburgh, Pennsylvania, U.S.	
15	Win	11–0–3 (1)	Kid Reynolds	KO	2 (?)	February 23, 1903	Masonic Hall, Allegheny, Pennsylvania, U.S.	
14	Win	10–0–3 (1)	Eddie Gardner	TKO	10 (15)	December 15, 1902	Casino Theatre, Terre Haute, Indiana, U.S.	
13	Win	9–0–3 (1)	Otis Southers	KO	2 (?)	December 1, 1902	Terre Haute, Indiana, U.S.	
12	Win	8–0–3 (1)	Bob Fanning	PTS	10	August 14, 1902	Columbia theatre, Frankfort, Indiana, U.S.	
11	Win	7–0–3 (1)	Bob Fanning	PTS	10	August 7, 1902	Columbia theatre, Frankfort, Indiana, U.S.	
10	Draw	6–0–3 (1)	Jack Cullen	PTS	10	May 5, 1902	Empire Theater, Indianapolis, Indiana, U.S.	
9	Draw	6–0–2 (1)	Steve Crosby	PTS	10	April 10, 1902	Cleveland Club, Indianapolis, Indiana, U.S.	
8	Win	6–0–1 (1)	Kid Stevens	KO	2 (?)	March 6, 1902	Odd Fellows Hall, Indianapolis, Indiana, U.S.	
7	ND	5–0–1 (1)	Eugene Bezenah	ND	?	December 16, 1901	Indianapolis, Indiana, U.S.	
6	Win	5–0–1	Jim Glasgow	KO	2 (6)	November 19, 1901	Columbia Club, Indianapolis, Indiana, U.S.	
5	Draw	4–0–1	Jack Cullen	PTS	10	May 11, 1901	Empire Theater, Indianapolis, Indiana, U.S.	
4	Win	4–0	William Love	KO	2 (?)	April 25, 1901	Alexandria A.C., Alexandria, Indiana, U.S.	
3	Win	3–0	John Dean	PTS	4	February 21, 1901	Alexandria A.C., Alexandria, Indiana, U.S.	
2	Win	2–0	Joe Trevan	PTS	4	December 27, 1900	Odd Fellows Hall, Indianapolis, Indiana, U.S.	
1	Win	1–0	Albert Bean	KO	7 (?)	April 29, 1900	Alexandria A.C., Alexandria, Indiana, U.S.	
