= Joe Grim =

American boxer

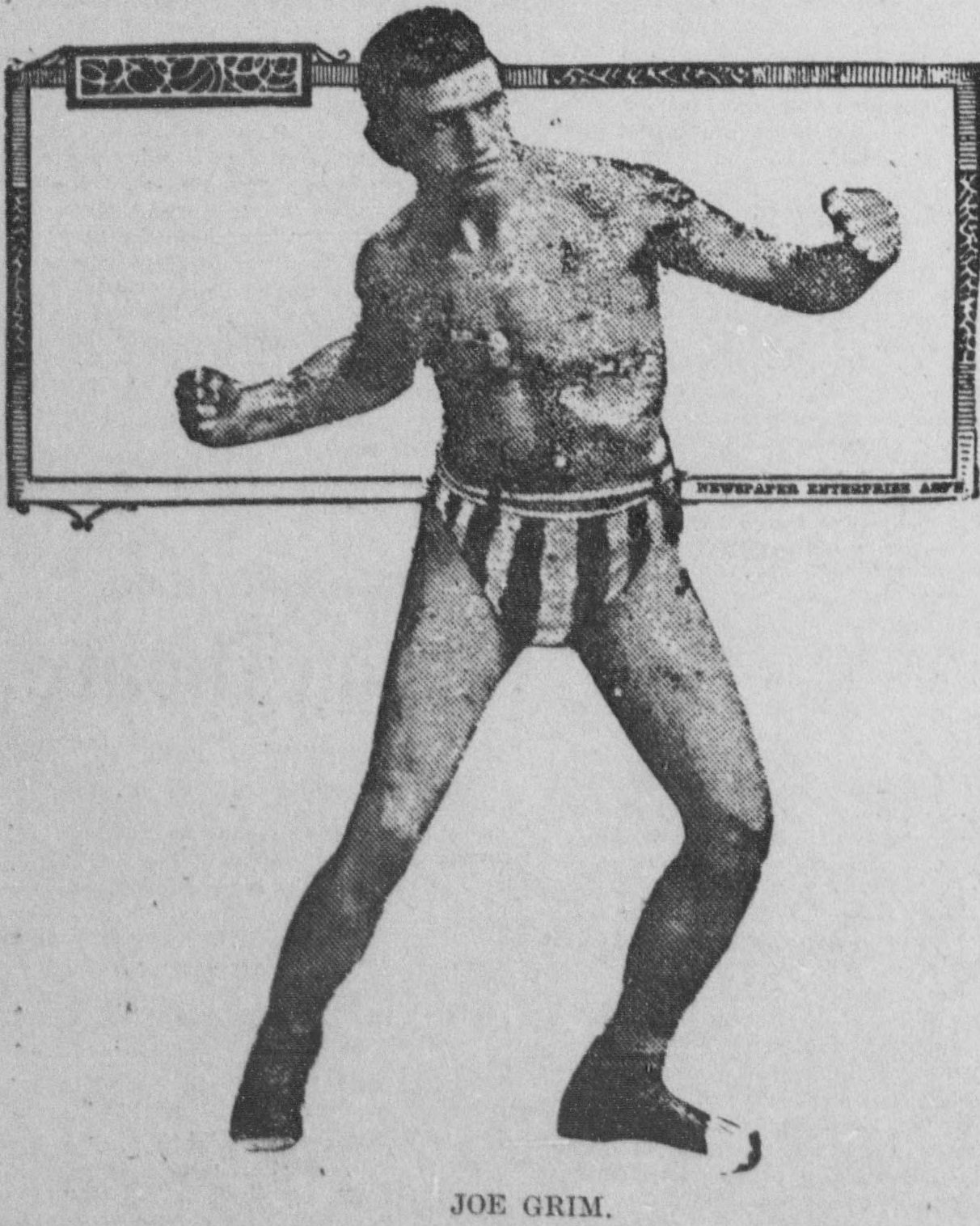

Personal information
- Nickname: The Iron Man
- Nationality: American
- Born: Saverio Giannone; March 16, 1881 Avellino, Campania, Italy
- Died: August 18, 1939 (aged 58) Philadelphia, Pennsylvania, United States
- Height: 5 ft 7 in (1.7m)
- Weight: Middleweight; Welterweight

Boxing career
- Stance: Orthodox

Boxing record
- Total fights: 152
- Wins: 24
- Win by KO: 10
- Losses: 104
- Draws: 22
- No contests: 2

Joe Grim (born Saverio Giannone; March 16, 1881 – August 18, 1939) was an American boxer of the early 20th century.

Grim was born in Avellino, Campania, and he and his family emigrated to the United States when he was ten. As a boxer, he engaged in over 150 professional bouts; some sources put the figure at 300 to 500. Despite losing the majority of his fights, Grim became a popular fighter; his principal claim to fame was his ability to absorb heavy punishment without being knocked out, for which he was nicknamed "The Iron Man" and "The Human Punching Bag". Typically, at the end of a bout, he would go to the ropes and shout "I am Joe Grim. I fear no man on earth." In 1930 he was described in The Ring as "the greatest physical freak the prize ring ever knew... Grim offered his body as a target to fighters who outweighed him by many pounds. He has the strangest claim to glory that an athlete ever made." Robert W. Edgren opined that "knocking the Iron Man down with fists is a waste of time and effort, for he keeps getting up. To drop Grim for a long count, a boxer – if permitted – should use a crowbar or a baseball bat."

In 1903 Grim took on former heavyweight champion Bob Fitzsimmons. Grim "took a battering... that would have killed an ordinary man" and was knocked down repeatedly, but rose to his feet every time and lasted the distance. Fitzsimmons called Grim "the hardest proposition to knock out that I have ever met" and thought him "insensible to physical pain." Two years later Grim faced future heavyweight champion Jack Johnson. Johnson dominated the six-round fight and by one estimate scored seventeen knockdowns, but Grim again made it to the final bell. Between rounds Johnson remarked to his cornermen: "he ain't human." Afterwards he said: "I just don't believe that man is made of flesh and blood."

His reputation as a man who could not be knocked out attracted numerous other high-profile opponents for Grim, among them Barbados Joe Walcott, Jack Blackburn, Joe Gans, Dixie Kid, Philadelphia Jack O'Brien, Battling Levinsky, and Peter Maher, all of whom were unable to stop him, despite many administering heavy beatings. Gans gave him a "severe pounding" and knocked him down in most rounds. The amount of punishment sustained by Grim during his fights led to calls for him to be banned from boxing. Though Grim did not win many bouts, he was credited with a newspaper decision over former welterweight champion Matty Matthews in 1904. He tried unsuccessfully to secure a fight with reigning heavyweight champion James J. Jeffries. His run came to an end when he was knocked out by Sailor Burke in 1906. Four years later, he was knocked out by Sam McVea in Paris.

Grim began to suffer mental health issues and was admitted to a sanitarium in 1913, before being released in 1916. He promoted fights in Philadelphia and worked as a foreman in a shipyard in New York. In later life he was committed to the Philadelphia Hospital for Mental Diseases, where he died in 1939.

Grim's tour of Australia in 1908-09 formed the basis for Michael Winkler's critically-acclaimed 2021 novel Grimmish.
