= San Francisco Athletic Club =

Boxing academy in California

The San Francisco Athletic Club was a boxing academy in San Francisco, California, known as the main training center for young boxers in the San Francisco Bay Area. The Club was opened in 1885 by Alex Greggains who had been a former middleweight boxing champion of California. (Note: Some sources note Greggains' first name as "Alec".) Greggains was said to have formed the club because the California State Legislature had passed a law prohibiting boxing matches except before a licensed club.

The venue held a twenty-foot boxing ring called "The Bear Garden". Fighters who trained at the club included James J. Corbett, Jimmy Britt, Jack Dempsey, Joe Choynski, and brothers Abe Attell and Monte Attell. Others who fought at the venue included Bob Fitzsimmons, James J. Jeffries, and Tom Sharkey. On June 15, 1888, Australia's Peter Jackson sparred with a San Francisco deputy sheriff in an exhibition match before his American debut.

The San Francisco Athletic Club, located in the neighborhood of what is now known as SoMa, was destroyed by the 1906 San Francisco earthquake and fire. (Note: In 1913, Pearson's Magazine described the club's location as being on Howard Street. A 2005 source described its location as on Shipley Street between Fifth and Sixth Streets. A 2011 source stated the address as 431 Sixth)

The Italian Athletic Club, then San Francisco Italian Athletic Club, used the name San Francisco Athletic Club once Italy was involved in the conflict in Europe in the first half of the twentieth century. In 1979 the word Italian was restored to the name of the club. Conflicting report by the Lofrano Family had the name change in June 1978. Asserting that the name change was instituted by Frank Lofrano, a successful San Francisco businessman and proudly of Italian heritage.
