= James Jeffries =

James or Jim Jeffries may refer to:

- James Jeffries (Louisiana politician) (1807–1898), American politician
- Jim Jeffries (politician) (James Edmund Jeffries, 1925–1997), American politician
- James J. Jeffries (1875–1953), American boxer
- Jim Jeffries (baseball) (1893–1938), American baseball player

== See also ==
- James Jeffrey (disambiguation)
- Jim Jefferies (disambiguation)
