= Ruhlin =

Ruhlin is a surname. Notable people with the surname include:

- Gus Ruhlin (1872–1912), American boxer
- Kristen Ruhlin (born 1984), American actress
