= Tom Sharkey =

Irish boxer

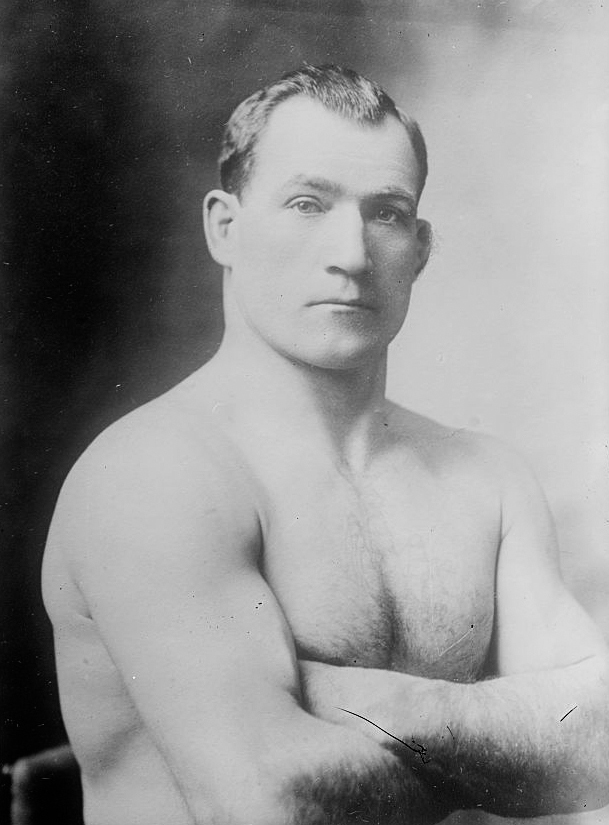
- Sharkey in 1910

Personal information
- Nickname: Sailor Tom
- Born: November 26, 1873 (Note: Although sources vary, with some stating he was born on January 1, 1871, and others on November 16, 1873.) Dundalk, Ireland
- Died: April 17, 1953 (aged 81) San Francisco, California, US
- Height: 5 ft 8 1/2 in (1.74 m)
- Weight: Heavyweight

Boxing career
- Reach: 70 1/2 in (179 cm)
- Stance: Orthodox

Boxing record
- Total fights: 54
- Wins: 37
- Win by KO: 34
- Losses: 9
- Draws: 6
- No contests: 2

Thomas "Sailor Tom" Sharkey (November 26, 1873 – April 17, 1953) was an Irish professional boxer who laid claim to the world heavyweight title by defeating Bob Fitzsimmons on December 2, 1896 in a highly controversial fight. Sharkey's recorded ring career spanned from 1893 to 1904. He is credited with having won 37 fights (with 34 KOs), 9 losses, 6 draws, and 2 no contests. In 1953, Sharkey was named in Ring Magazine's list of 100 greatest punchers of all time.

He is notable for his bouts with heavyweight champions James J. Jeffries, "Gentleman Jim" Corbett, and Bob Fitzsimmons, fighting them each twice.

== Early life ==
Sharkey was born in Dundalk, Ireland, on November 26, 1873. His story began when he ran away from home and went to sea as a cabin boy. In 1892, Sharkey landed in New York City and joined the United States Navy. He was eventually deployed to Hawaii where he began his pro fighting career.

== Professional career ==
Standing 5 ft 8 in (1.73 m) tall, Sharkey had unusually broad shoulders for a man of his height, and sported a tattoo of a star and battleship on his chest. In 1900, he also acquired a large cauliflower ear, courtesy of a brawl with Gus Ruhlin, that added to his persona.

Sharkey won his first professional bout against British Navy heavyweight champion Jack Gardner, who he knocked out in the fourth round on St. Patrick's Day 1893. In 1896, he met his first real challenge when he went the distance with hall of famer Joe Choynski, who later knocked out legendary heavyweight Jack Johnson in an eight-round match, and claimed victory after eight rough rounds. Sharkey followed that fight up by challenging "Gentleman Jim" Corbett. The two met and the fight was ruled a draw after four rounds due to police interference.

=== Sharkey vs. Fitzsimmons ===
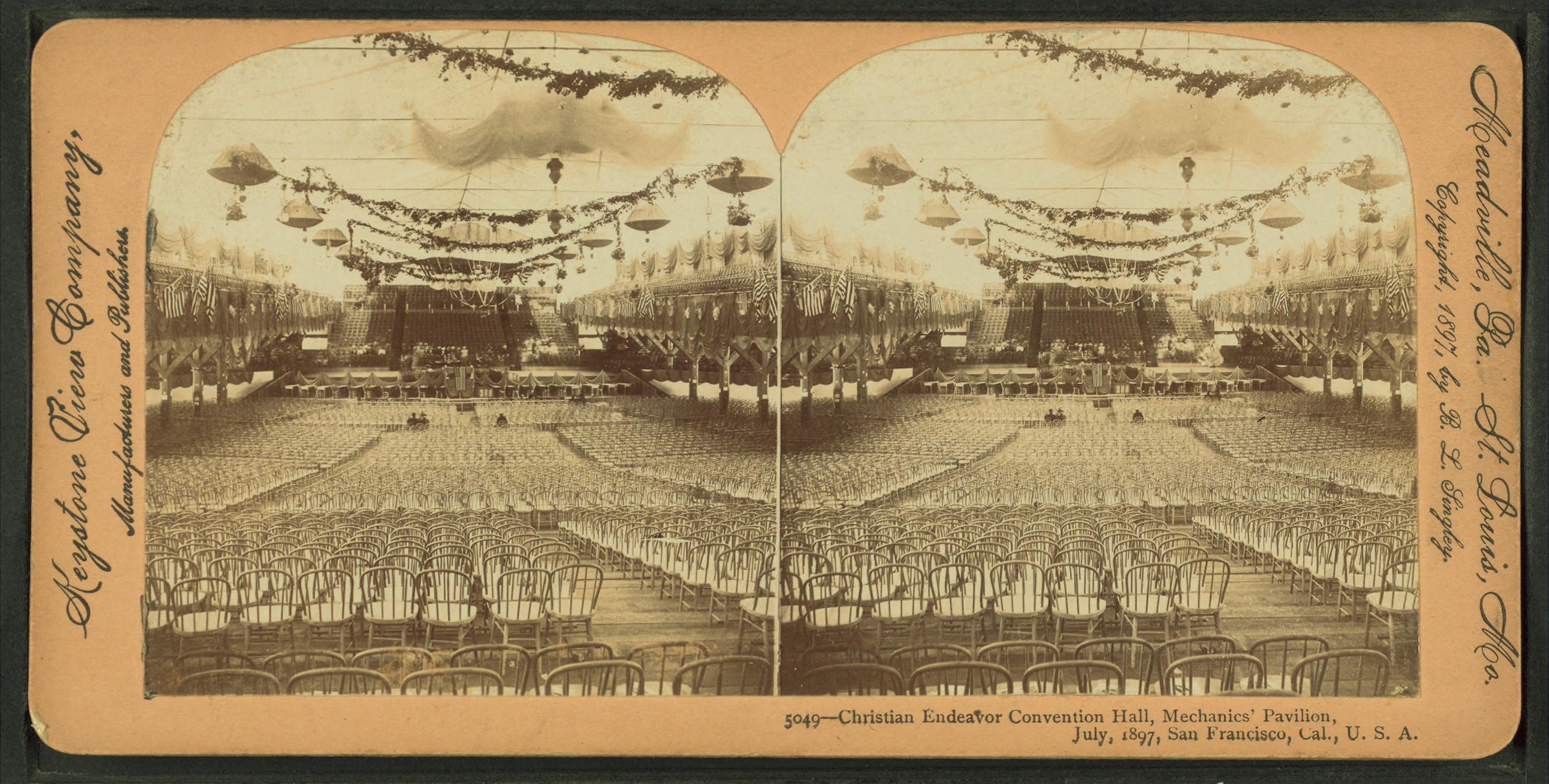
Interior of the Mechanics Pavilion, San Francisco, in 1897

On December 2, 1896, the San Francisco Athletic Club sponsored a fight at the Mechanics' Pavilion in San Francisco between Bob Fitzsimmons and Sharkey. Unable to find a referee, at the last minute they called on former lawman Wyatt Earp. He had officiated 30 or so matches in earlier days, though not under the Marquess of Queensbury rules. The fight may have been the most anticipated fight on American soil that year. It had been billed for the heavyweight championship of the world, as it was thought that the champion, James J. Corbett, had relinquished the crown.

Fitzsimmons was favored to win, and bets flowed heavily his way. Earp entered the ring still armed with his customary Colt .45 and drew a lot of attention when he had to be disarmed. He later said he forgot he was wearing it. Fitzsimmons was taller and quicker than Sharkey and dominated the fight from the opening bell. In the eighth round, Fitzsimmons hit Sharkey with his famed "solar plexus punch", an uppercut under the heart that could render a man temporarily helpless. The punch caught Sharkey, Earp, and most of the crowd by surprise, and Sharkey dropped, clutched his groin, and rolled on the canvas, screamed foul.

Earp stopped the bout, ruling that Fitzsimmons had hit Sharkey when he was down. His ruling was greeted with loud boos and catcalls. Earp based his decision on the Marquess of Queensberry rules, which state in part, "A man on one knee is considered down and if struck is entitled to the stakes." Very few witnessed the foul Earp ruled on. He awarded the decision to Sharkey, whom attendants carried out as "limp as a rag".

=== Sharkey vs. Jeffries ===
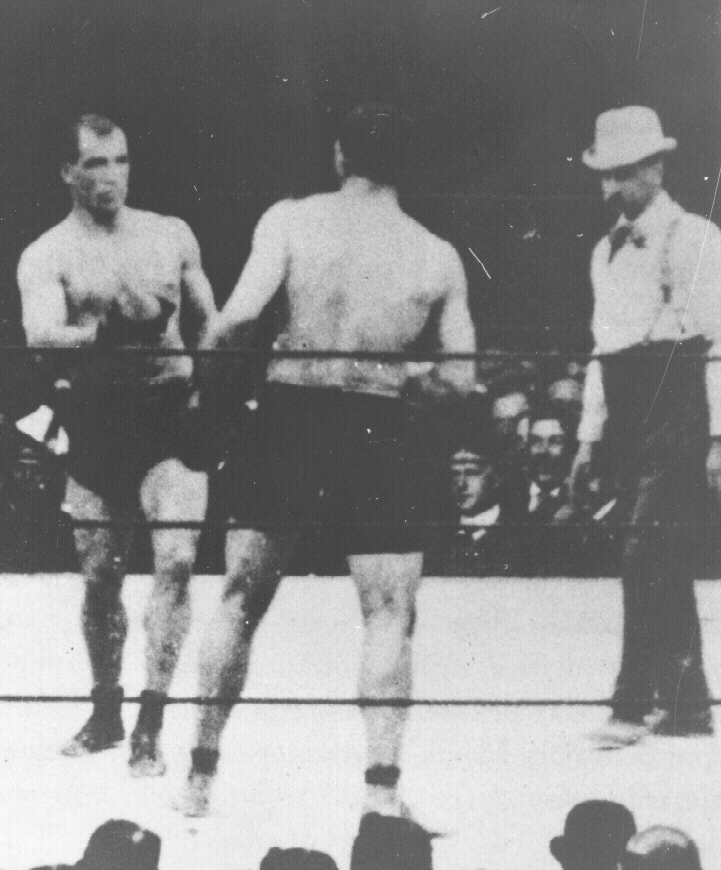
Sharkey (left) during his fight with Jeffries

Sharkey claimed the heavyweight title until Corbett resumed his fighting career, who was recognized as the champion until he was knocked out by Fitzsimmons in a title bout. Sharkey was involved in another controversial fight when he faced Corbett on November 22, 1898. In this bout, Sharkey manhandled the shifty and elusive Corbett. He threw him to the ground, hit him with hard punches to the body and head and seemed on the verge of victory when one of Corbett's seconds jumped into the ring in the ninth round. The referee disqualified Corbett and awarded the bout to Sharkey.

On January 10, 1899, Sharkey faced another ring legend, the tricky Kid McCoy. Sharkey knocked out McCoy in the tenth round thereby securing a shot at the heavyweight title then held by James J. Jeffries. The two had met previously, fighting a hotly contested 20-round slugfest on May 6, 1898. The decision went to Jeffries in a close fight. Nevertheless, Sharkey vowed to beat the 6-foot-2.5-inch (1.892 m) burly Jeffries in the rematch.

The two fought a memorable twenty-five round bout on November 3, 1899, in Coney Island, New York. The match was the first championship fight filmed for motion pictures, and was the first indoor fight successfully filmed. The lights required for the filming were so hot that they burned the hair from the top of both fighters' heads.

Sharkey took the early lead when he battered the larger Jeffries, but Jeffries gained control of the fight in the later rounds and the bout was awarded to him. During this fight, Sharkey suffered a broken nose and two broken ribs, and his left ear swelled to the size of a grapefruit.

== Later life ==
After retiring from boxing, Sharkey operated a saloon and worked as a night watchman and security guard. In 1938, he entered Laguna Honda Hospital in San Francisco, according to newspaper accounts, desperately ill. He died there in 1953 and is buried at Golden Gate National Cemetery in San Bruno, California.

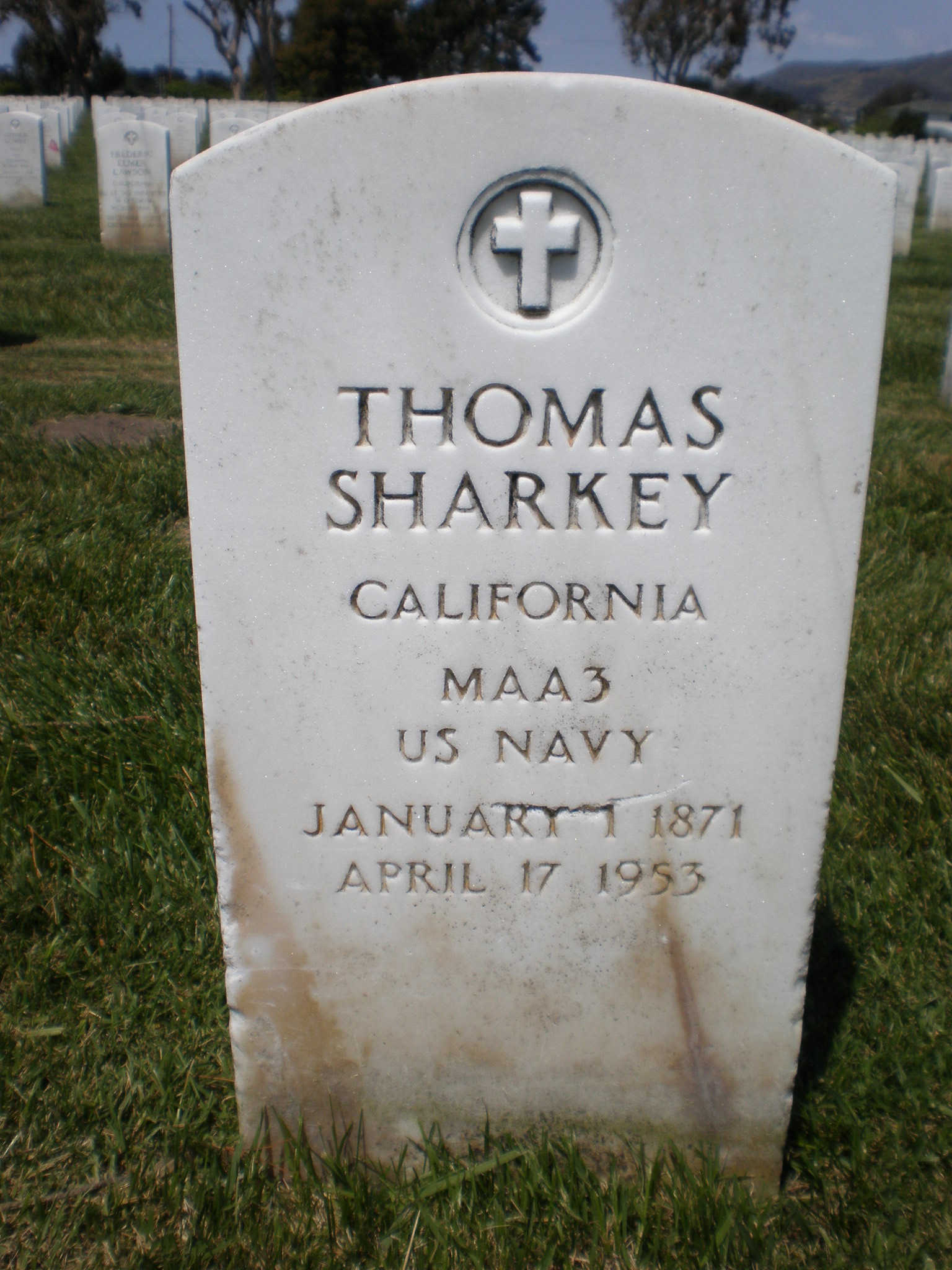
Sharkey's headstone

== Professional boxing record ==
All information in this section is derived from BoxRec, unless otherwise stated.

=== Official record ===
54 fights	37 wins	7 losses
By knockout	34	4
By decision	1	2
By disqualification	2	1
Draws	6	
No contests	2	
Newspaper decisions/draws	2	

All newspaper decisions are officially regarded as “no decision” bouts and are not counted in the win/loss/draw column.

No.	Result	Record	Opponent	Type	Round, time	Date	Location	Notes
54	Loss	37–7–6 (4)	Jack Munroe	NWS	6	Feb 27, 1904	2nd Regiment Armory, Philadelphia, Pennsylvania, US	
53	Loss	37–7–6 (3)	Gus Ruhlin	TKO	11 (15)	Jun 25, 1902	National Sporting Club, London, England, UK	For English heavyweight title
52	NC	37–6–6 (3)	Peter Maher	NC	3 (6)	Jan 17, 1902	Industrial Hall, Philadelphia, Pennsylvania, US	Stopped for lack of action
51	Loss	37–6–6 (2)	Mexican Pete Everett	DQ	2 (20)	May 7, 1901	Opera House, Cripple Creek, Colorado, US	
50	Win	37–5–6 (2)	Fred Russell	KO	4 (10)	May 3, 1901	Colorado A.C., Denver, Colorado, US	
49	Loss	36–5–6 (2)	Bob Fitzsimmons	KO	2 (25), 2:06	Aug 24, 1900	Coney Island A.C., New York City, New York, US	
48	Loss	36–4–6 (2)	Gus Ruhlin	TKO	15 (25)	Jun 26, 1900	Seaside A.C., Coney Island, New York City, New York, US	
47	Win	36–3–6 (2)	Yank Kenny	KO	1 (25), 2:16	Jun 8, 1900	Broadway A.C., New York City, New York, US	
46	Win	35–3–6 (2)	Joe Choynski	TKO	3 (6)	May 8, 1900	Tattersall's, Chicago, Illinois, US	
45	Win	34–3–6 (2)	Tom 'Stockings' Conroy	KO	3 (10), 2:12	Mar 29, 1900	Music Hall, Baltimore, Maryland, US	
44	Win	33–3–6 (2)	Jack McCormick	KO	1 (20), 0:38	Mar 15, 1900	Coliseum, Hartford, Connecticut, US	
43	Win	32–3–6 (2)	Jim Jeffords	KO	2 (10), 2:06	Feb 19, 1900	Light Guard Armory, Detroit, Michigan, US	
42	Win	31–3–6 (2)	Joe Goddard	TKO	4 (6), 1:10	Feb 13, 1900	Industrial Hall, Philadelphia, Pennsylvania, US	
41	Loss	30–3–6 (2)	James J. Jeffries	PTS	25	Nov 3, 1899	Coney Island A.C., New York City, New York, US	For world heavyweight title
40	Win	30–2–6 (2)	Jack McCormick	KO	2 (6)	Jan 30, 1899	Arena A.C., Philadelphia, Pennsylvania, US	
39	Win	29–2–6 (2)	Charles 'Kid' McCoy	KO	10 (20), 1:13	Jan 10, 1899	Lenox A.C., New York City, New York, US	
38	Win	28–2–6 (2)	James J. Corbett	DQ	9 (20)	Nov 22, 1898	Lenox A.C., New York City, New York, US	
37	Win	27–2–6 (2)	Gus Ruhlin	KO	1 (25), 2:17	Jun 29, 1898	Greater New York A.C., New York City, New York, US	
36	Loss	26–2–6 (2)	James J. Jeffries	PTS	20	May 6, 1898	Mechanic's Pavilion, San Francisco, California, US	Lost world heavyweight title claim
35	Draw	26–1–6 (2)	Joe Choynski	PTS	8 (20)	Mar 11, 1898	Mechanic's Pavilion, San Francisco, California, US	Choynski fell out of the ring and the fight was declared a draw
34	Win	26–1–5 (2)	Joe Goddard	KO	6 (20)	Nov 18, 1897	Mechanic's Pavilion, San Francisco, California, US	Retained world heavyweight title claim
33	Win	25–1–5 (2)	Punch Vaughn	KO	3 (?)	Aug 16, 1897	Liverpool, Merseyside, England, UK	
32	Win	24–1–5 (2)	Tom Parks	KO	1 (?)	Aug 7, 1897	Town Hall, Dundalk, Ireland	
31	Win	23–1–5 (2)	Pat McCourt	KO	2 (?)	Jul 30, 1897	Warrenpoint, Northern Ireland, UK	
30	Win	22–1–5 (2)	Joe Craig	KO	1 (?)	Jul 23, 1897	Ginnett's Circus, Belfast, Northern Ireland, UK	
29	Draw	21–1–5 (2)	Peter Maher	PTS	7	Jun 9, 1897	Palace A.C., New York City, New York, US	
28	Draw	21–1–4 (2)	Jim Williams	PTS	8	Apr 5, 1897	Salt Lake City, Utah, US	
27	Win	21–1–3 (2)	Bob Fitzsimmons	DQ	8 (10)	Dec 2, 1896	Mechanic's Pavilion, San Francisco, California, US	Won world heavyweight title claim
26	Loss	20–1–3 (2)	Reddy Gallagher	NWS	4	Oct 1, 1896	Lyceum Theater, Denver, Colorado, US	
25	Draw	20–1–3 (1)	James J. Corbett	PTS	4	Jun 24, 1896	Mechanic's Pavilion, San Francisco, California, US	
24	Win	20–1–2 (1)	Jim Williams	TKO	7 (10)	Jun 3, 1896	Mechanic's Pavilion, San Francisco, California, US	
23	Win	19–1–2 (1)	Joe Choynski	PTS	8	Apr 16, 1896	People's Palace Theater, San Francisco, California, US	
22	Win	18–1–2 (1)	'Sailor' Charles Brown	KO	1 (?)	Apr 7, 1896	Vallejo, California, US	
21	Draw	17–1–2 (1)	Alec Greggains	PTS	8	Mar 12, 1896	Bush Street Theater, San Francisco, California, US	
20	Win	17–1–1 (1)	John Miller	TKO	9 (?)	Nov 7, 1895	Colma A.C., Colma, California, US	
19	Win	16–1–1 (1)	William Dunn	KO	1 (?), 0:58	Aug 17, 1895	Vallejo, California, US	
18	Win	15–1–1 (1)	Australian Billy Smith	TKO	7 (20)	Jul 25, 1895	Colma A.C., Colma, California, US	
17	Win	14–1–1 (1)	Martin Mulverhill	KO	20 (?)	Oct 20, 1894	Armory Hall, Vallejo, California, US	
16	Win	13–1–1 (1)	Sailor Charles Brown	KO	1 (?)	Aug 21, 1894	Vallejo, California, US	
15	Win	12–1–1 (1)	Jack Marks	KO	1 (?)	Aug 11, 1894	Vallejo, California, US	
14	Win	11–1–1 (1)	Rough Thompson	KO	4 (?)	Aug 4, 1894	Honolulu, Hawaii	
13	Win	10–1–1 (1)	Jack McAuley	KO	1 (?)	Jul 18, 1894	Honolulu, Hawaii	
12	Win	9–1–1 (1)	Billy Tate	KO	2 (?)	Jul 18, 1894	Honolulu, Hawaii	
11	ND	8–1–1 (1)	Nick Burley	ND	3	Jun 21, 1894	Opera House, Honolulu, Hawaii	
10	Win	8–1–1	Jack Langley	KO	8 (?)	Jun 20, 1894	Honolulu, Hawaii	
9	Draw	7–1–1	Nick Burley	PTS	9 (8)	May 24, 1894	Honolulu, Hawaii	For vacant Hawaii heavyweight title
8	Win	7–1	Rough Thompson	KO	2 (?)	May 14, 1894	Honolulu, Hawaii	
7	Loss	6–1	George Washington	KO	? (?)	Feb 7, 1894	Honolulu, Hawaii	
6	Win	6–0	Jim Barrington	KO	1 (?)	Sep 10, 1893	Honolulu, Hawaii	
5	Win	5–0	John Walsh	KO	2 (?)	Aug 21, 1893	Honolulu, Hawaii	
4	Win	4–0	Jim Harvey	KO	2 (?)	May 27, 1893	Honolulu, Hawaii	
3	Win	3–0	Jack Langley	KO	4 (?)	May 3, 1893	Honolulu, Hawaii	
2	Win	2–0	J. Pickett	KO	2 (?)	Apr 7, 1893	Honolulu, Hawaii	
1	Win	1–0	Jack Gardner	KO	4 (?)	Mar 17, 1893	Honolulu, Hawaii	

=== Unofficial record ===
54 fights	37 wins	9 losses
By knockout	34	4
By decision	1	4
By disqualification	2	1
Draws	6	
No contests	2	

Record with the inclusion of newspaper decisions in the win/loss/draw column.

No.	Result	Record	Opponent	Type	Round, time	Date	Location	Notes
54	Loss	37–9–6 (2)	Jack Munroe	NWS	6	Feb 27, 1904	2nd Regiment Armory, Philadelphia, Pennsylvania, US	
53	Loss	37–8–6 (2)	Gus Ruhlin	TKO	11 (15)	Jun 25, 1902	National Sporting Club, London, England, UK	For English heavyweight title
52	NC	37–7–6 (2)	Peter Maher	NC	3 (6)	Jan 17, 1902	Industrial Hall, Philadelphia, Pennsylvania, US	Stopped for lack of action
51	Loss	37–7–6 (1)	Mexican Pete Everett	DQ	2 (20)	May 7, 1901	Opera House, Cripple Creek, Colorado, US	
50	Win	37–6–6 (1)	Fred Russell	KO	4 (10)	May 3, 1901	Colorado A.C., Denver, Colorado, US	
49	Loss	36–6–6 (1)	Bob Fitzsimmons	KO	2 (25), 2:06	Aug 24, 1900	Coney Island A.C., New York City, New York, US	
48	Loss	36–5–6 (1)	Gus Ruhlin	TKO	15 (25)	Jun 26, 1900	Seaside A.C., Coney Island, New York City, New York, US	
47	Win	36–4–6 (1)	Yank Kenny	KO	1 (25), 2:16	Jun 8, 1900	Broadway A.C., New York City, New York, US	
46	Win	35–4–6 (1)	Joe Choynski	TKO	3 (6)	May 8, 1900	Tattersall's, Chicago, Illinois, US	
45	Win	34–4–6 (1)	Tom 'Stockings' Conroy	KO	3 (10), 2:12	Mar 29, 1900	Music Hall, Baltimore, Maryland, US	
44	Win	33–4–6 (1)	Jack McCormick	KO	1 (20), 0:38	Mar 15, 1900	Coliseum, Hartford, Connecticut, US	
43	Win	32–4–6 (1)	Jim Jeffords	KO	2 (10), 2:06	Feb 19, 1900	Light Guard Armory, Detroit, Michigan, US	
42	Win	31–4–6 (1)	Joe Goddard	TKO	4 (6), 1:10	Feb 13, 1900	Industrial Hall, Philadelphia, Pennsylvania, US	
41	Loss	30–4–6 (1)	James J. Jeffries	PTS	25	Nov 3, 1899	Coney Island A.C., New York City, New York, US	For world heavyweight title
40	Win	30–3–6 (1)	Jack McCormick	KO	2 (6)	Jan 30, 1899	Arena A.C., Philadelphia, Pennsylvania, US	
39	Win	29–3–6 (1)	Charles 'Kid' McCoy	KO	10 (20), 1:13	Jan 10, 1899	Lenox A.C., New York City, New York, US	
38	Win	28–3–6 (1)	James J. Corbett	DQ	9 (20)	Nov 22, 1898	Lenox A.C., New York City, New York, US	
37	Win	27–3–6 (1)	Gus Ruhlin	KO	1 (25), 2:17	Jun 29, 1898	Greater New York A.C., New York City, New York, US	
36	Loss	26–3–6 (1)	James J. Jeffries	PTS	20	May 6, 1898	Mechanic's Pavilion, San Francisco, California, US	Lost world heavyweight title claim
35	Draw	26–2–6 (1)	Joe Choynski	PTS	8 (20)	Mar 11, 1898	Mechanic's Pavilion, San Francisco, California, US	Choynski fell out of the ring and the fight was declared a draw
34	Win	26–2–5 (1)	Joe Goddard	KO	6 (20)	Nov 18, 1897	Mechanic's Pavilion, San Francisco, California, US	Retained world heavyweight title claim
33	Win	25–2–5 (1)	Punch Vaughn	KO	3 (?)	Aug 16, 1897	Liverpool, Merseyside, England, UK	
32	Win	24–2–5 (1)	Tom Parks	KO	1 (?)	Aug 7, 1897	Town Hall, Dundalk, Ireland	
31	Win	23–2–5 (1)	Pat McCourt	KO	2 (?)	Jul 30, 1897	Warrenpoint, Northern Ireland, UK	
30	Win	22–2–5 (1)	Joe Craig	KO	1 (?)	Jul 23, 1897	Ginnett's Circus, Belfast, Northern Ireland, UK	
29	Draw	21–2–5 (1)	Peter Maher	PTS	7	Jun 9, 1897	Palace A.C., New York City, New York, US	
28	Draw	21–2–4 (1)	Jim Williams	PTS	8	Apr 5, 1897	Salt Lake City, Utah, US	
27	Win	21–2–3 (1)	Bob Fitzsimmons	DQ	8 (10)	Dec 2, 1896	Mechanic's Pavilion, San Francisco, California, US	Won world heavyweight title claim
26	Loss	20–2–3 (1)	Reddy Gallagher	NWS	4	Oct 1, 1896	Lyceum Theater, Denver, Colorado, US	
25	Draw	20–1–3 (1)	James J. Corbett	PTS	4	Jun 24, 1896	Mechanic's Pavilion, San Francisco, California, US	
24	Win	20–1–2 (1)	Jim Williams	TKO	7 (10)	Jun 3, 1896	Mechanic's Pavilion, San Francisco, California, US	
23	Win	19–1–2 (1)	Joe Choynski	PTS	8	Apr 16, 1896	People's Palace Theater, San Francisco, California, US	
22	Win	18–1–2 (1)	'Sailor' Charles Brown	KO	1 (?)	Apr 7, 1896	Vallejo, California, US	
21	Draw	17–1–2 (1)	Alec Greggains	PTS	8	Mar 12, 1896	Bush Street Theater, San Francisco, California, US	
20	Win	17–1–1 (1)	John Miller	TKO	9 (?)	Nov 7, 1895	Colma A.C., Colma, California, US	
19	Win	16–1–1 (1)	William Dunn	KO	1 (?), 0:58	Aug 17, 1895	Vallejo, California, US	
18	Win	15–1–1 (1)	Australian Billy Smith	TKO	7 (20)	Jul 25, 1895	Colma A.C., Colma, California, US	
17	Win	14–1–1 (1)	Martin Mulverhill	KO	20 (?)	Oct 20, 1894	Armory Hall, Vallejo, California, US	
16	Win	13–1–1 (1)	Sailor Charles Brown	KO	1 (?)	Aug 21, 1894	Vallejo, California, US	
15	Win	12–1–1 (1)	Jack Marks	KO	1 (?)	Aug 11, 1894	Vallejo, California, US	
14	Win	11–1–1 (1)	Rough Thompson	KO	4 (?)	Aug 4, 1894	Honolulu, Hawaii	
13	Win	10–1–1 (1)	Jack McAuley	KO	1 (?)	Jul 18, 1894	Honolulu, Hawaii	
12	Win	9–1–1 (1)	Billy Tate	KO	2 (?)	Jul 18, 1894	Honolulu, Hawaii	
11	ND	8–1–1 (1)	Nick Burley	ND	3	Jun 21, 1894	Opera House, Honolulu, Hawaii	
10	Win	8–1–1	Jack Langley	KO	8 (?)	Jun 20, 1894	Honolulu, Hawaii	
9	Draw	7–1–1	Nick Burley	PTS	9 (8)	May 24, 1894	Honolulu, Hawaii	For vacant Hawaii heavyweight title
8	Win	7–1	Rough Thompson	KO	2 (?)	May 14, 1894	Honolulu, Hawaii	
7	Loss	6–1	George Washington	KO	? (?)	Feb 7, 1894	Honolulu, Hawaii	
6	Win	6–0	Jim Barrington	KO	1 (?)	Sep 10, 1893	Honolulu, Hawaii	
5	Win	5–0	John Walsh	KO	2 (?)	Aug 21, 1893	Honolulu, Hawaii	
4	Win	4–0	Jim Harvey	KO	2 (?)	May 27, 1893	Honolulu, Hawaii	
3	Win	3–0	Jack Langley	KO	4 (?)	May 3, 1893	Honolulu, Hawaii	
2	Win	2–0	J. Pickett	KO	2 (?)	Apr 7, 1893	Honolulu, Hawaii	
1	Win	1–0	Jack Gardner	KO	4 (?)	Mar 17, 1893	Honolulu, Hawaii	

Titles in pretence
Preceded by Bob Fitzsimmons	World Heavyweight Champion; December 2, 1896 – November 22, 1898; Lost bid for undisputed title	Vacant Title next held by Sam Langford
