= Morris Grant =

American boxer (1845–1915)

Personal information
- Nationality: American
- Born: May 11, 1845 James Island, South Carolina
- Died: May 23, 1915 (aged 70) Bronx, New York
- Height: 6 ft 0.5 in (1.84 m)
- Weight: Heavyweight

Boxing career

Boxing record
- Total fights: 18
- Wins: 5
- Win by KO: 2
- Losses: 9
- Draws: 1
- No contests: 2

Morris Grant (May 11, 1845 – May 23, 1915), was an African American boxer who claimed the status of being the World Colored Heavyweight Champ and was the second boxer recognized as such. He likely was born into slavery in South Carolina, either on James Island or in an area of Charlestown at the site of the now-defunct town of St. James.

== Fights with Charles Hadley ==
Grant fought his successor as the colored heavyweight champion Charles "The Professor" Hadley twelve times between 1881 and 1883. Their first recorded match was January 14, 1881, when he lost on points in a three-rounder. Hadley claimed the Grant's title after the victory.

Despite fighting Hadley ten more times while he was the colored champ, Grant failed to wrest the title from him. In their seventh fight, held on 4 May 1882 in New York City, Grant did not lose for the first time, when the four-rounder was declared a no-contest. Their next fight, on June 20 of the same year, saw Morris finally beat the undefeated Hadley (whose "official" record was 12-0-2 at the time), besting the champ on points in a four rounder. Hadley apparently did not put his belt at stake for the fight, for he continued as champion until 1883, when he was finally bested by George "Old Chocolate" Godfrey.

Morris lost three more fights to Hadley during his championship reign and one after Hadley lost the title to Godfrey. The last time they battled while Hadley was the colored champ was on 7 December 1882, when they fought in New York City for the Police Gazette Medal Championship of America. Morris was KO-ed in the third round. Their last fight was on 8 December 1883, exactly one year and one day after they had last met in the ring. Morris apparently was outpointed by the ex-champ. It was his last recorded pro bout.

== Requiem for a Heavyweight ==
Morris Grant remained in New York City for the rest of his life. Although census records and city directories list his occupation as a "waiter," it appears that he worked primarily as a bouncer in bars in the Tenderloin section of Manhattan, as well as being employed by Tammany Hall as a political operative .

He married a woman twenty-five years his junior, by whom he had three daughters, but was widowed by 1910 By the end of his life, he was crippled to the extent that he had to walk with the use of two canes and died in the Bronx in May 1915.

== Record ==
Grant's official record is five wins (two by knockout) against 10 losses (he was KO-ed four times) and one draw. He also recorded one newspaper decision win.

== Legacy & Honors ==
In 2020 award-winning author Mark Allen Baker published the first comprehensive account of The World Colored Heavyweight Championship, 1876–1937, with McFarland & Company, a leading independent publisher of academic & nonfiction books. This history traces the advent and demise of the Championship, the stories of the talented professional athletes who won it, and the demarcation of the color line both in and out of the ring.

For decades the World Colored Heavyweight Championship was a useful tool to combat racial oppression-the existence of the title was a leverage mechanism, or tool, used as a technique to counter a social element, “drawing the color line.”

== Professional boxing record ==
18 fights	5 wins	9 losses
By knockout	2	4
By decision	3	5
Draws	2	
No contests	2	

No.	Result	Record	Opponent	Type	Round	Date	Location	Notes
18	Loss	5–9–2 (2)	Charles Hadley	PTS	?	Dec 8, 1883	New York City, New York, U.S.	
17	Loss	5–8–2 (2)	Charles Hadley	KO	3 (4)	Dec 7, 1882	Harry Hill's, New York City, New York, U.S.	For Police Gazette Medal Championship of America
16	Loss	5–7–2 (2)	Charles Hadley	KO	1 (?)	Dec 1, 1882	New York City, New York, U.S.	Date Uncertain
15	ND	5–6–2 (2)	Gus Lambert	ND	4	Nov 16, 1882	New York City, New York, U.S.	
14	Loss	5–6–2 (1)	Charles Hadley	PTS	?	Nov 7, 1882	New York City, New York, U.S.	For inaugural Police Gazette Medal Championship of America
13	Win	5–5–2 (1)	Viro Small	PTS	4	Jun 29, 1882	New York City, New York, U.S.	
12	Win	4–5–2 (1)	Charles Hadley	PTS	4	Jun 20, 1882	New York City, New York, U.S.	
11	ND	3–5–2 (1)	Charles Hadley	ND	4 (?)	May 4, 1882	New York City, New York, U.S.	
10	Loss	3–5–2	Charles Hadley	KO	2 (?)	Apr 26, 1882	New York City, New York, U.S.	
9	Loss	3–4–2	Charles Hadley	KO	2 (?)	Apr 6, 1882	New York City, New York, U.S.	
8	Win	3–3–2	Charles Fletcher	TKO	2 (?)	Jan 26, 1882	Harry Hill's, New York City, New York, U.S.	
7	Draw	2–3–2	Charles Hadley	PTS	3	Jan 12, 1882	Harry Hill's, New York City, New York, U.S.	
6	Loss	2–3–1	Charles Hadley	PTS	1	Jan 1, 1882	New York City, New York, U.S.	Date uncertain
5	Loss	2–2–1	Charles Hadley	PTS	3	Dec 1, 1881	New York City, New York, U.S.	Date uncertain
4	Win	2–1–1	Charles Cooley	TKO	7 (?)	Mar 31, 1881	Harry Hill's, New York City, New York, U.S.	
3	Loss	1–1–1	Charles Hadley	PTS	3	Jan 14, 1881	New York City, New York, U.S.	
2	Draw	1–0–1	Dangerous Jack Watson	PTS	?	Feb 28, 1880	New York City, New York, U.S.	
1	Win	1–0	Gonzalo Rodriguez	PTS	?	Jan 2, 1880	United States of America	Date uncertain

Awards and achievements
Preceded by Charles C. Smith	World Colored Heavyweight Champion; 1878 - 1881	Succeeded by Charles Hadley
