= C.C. Smith =

C.C. Smith may refer to:

- Charles C. Smith (boxer) (1860–1924), American boxer
- Cecil Clementi Smith (1840–1916), British colonial administrator
- Cedric C. Smith (1895–1969), All-American football player for the University of Michigan and the Buffalo All-Americans
- Charles C. Smith (Virginia politician), mayor of Newport News, Virginia, 1924–1926
- Charles C. Smith (Pennsylvania politician) (1908–1970), Pennsylvania state representative
- Christopher Corey Smith (born 1968), voice actor

== See also ==
- List of people with surname Smith
