= Charles Hadley =

American boxer (1846–1897)

Personal information
- Nationality: American
- Born: September 30, 1846 Nashville, Tennessee
- Died: June 28, 1897 (aged 50) Spokane, Washington
- Height: 5 ft 9.5 in (1.77 m)
- Weight: Heavyweight

Boxing career

Boxing record
- Total fights: 45
- Wins: 20
- Win by KO: 10
- Losses: 16
- Draws: 6
- No contests: 3

Charles Hadley (September 30, 1846 – June 28, 1897), nicknamed "The Professor", was an African American boxer who was the third World Colored Heavyweight Champion, reigning from January 14, 1881, to February 23, 1883. The 5′9½″ boxer fought out of Bridgeport, Connecticut as a heavyweight.

== Fights with Morris Grant ==
Hadley won the colored heavyweight championship from Morris Grant, whom he fought twelve times between 1881 and 1883. Their first recorded match was January 14, 1881, when Hadley won points in a three-rounder and claimed the Grant's title.

Hadley fought Grant a 10 more times while he was the colored champ, beating him eight times. In their seventh fight, held on May 4, 1882, in New York City, their four-rounder was declared a no-contest. Their next fight, on June 20 of the same year, saw Morris finally beat the undefeated Hadley (whose "official" record was 12-0-2 at the time), besting the champ on points in a four rounder. Hadley apparently did not put his belt at stake for the fight, for he continued as champion until 1883, when he was finally bested by George "Old Chocolate" Godfrey.

Morris lost three more fights to Hadley during his championship reign and one after Hadley lost his title to Godfrey. The last time they battled while Hadley was the colored champ was on December 7, 1882, when they fought in New York City for the Police Gazette Medal Championship of America. Hadley KO-ed Morris in the third round. Their last fight was on December 8, 1883-12-08, exactly one year and one day after they had last met in the ring. Morris apparently was outpointed by the ex-champ and retired from pro boxing.

== Record ==
In a career that lasted from 1869 to 1891, Hadley racked up a record of 25 wins (14 by knock-out) against 13 losses (being KO-ed five times) with six draws.

== Legacy & Honors ==
In 2020 award-winning author Mark Allen Baker published the first comprehensive account of The World Colored Heavyweight Championship, 1876–1937, with McFarland & Company, a leading independent publisher of academic & nonfiction books. This history traces the advent and demise of the Championship, the stories of the talented professional athletes who won it, and the demarcation of the color line both in and out of the ring.

For decades the World Colored Heavyweight Championship was a useful tool to combat racial oppression-the existence of the title a leverage mechanism, or tool, used as a technique to counter a social element, “drawing the color line.”

== Professional boxing record ==
45 fights	20 wins	16 losses
By knockout	10	5
By decision	9	10
By disqualification	1	1
Draws	6	
No contests	3	

No.	Result	Record	Opponent	Type	Round	Date	Age	Location	Notes
45	ND	20–16–6 (3)	Tommy Cleary	ND	?	Aug 1, 1891	N/A	Amsterdam, New York, US	Police intervened; Date uncertain
44	Draw	20–16–6 (2)	Tommy Cleary	PTS	?	Apr 1, 1891	N/A	Albany, New York, US	Date uncertain
43	Loss	20–16–5 (2)	Jack Senrab	PTS	4	Jan 4, 1891	44 years, 96 days	Barnes Road House, Spokane, Washington, US	
42	Loss	20–15–5 (2)	Dave Campbell	PTS	4	May 29, 1890	43 years, 241 days	American Resort, Spokane Falls, Washington, US	
41	Loss	20–14–5 (2)	Harris Martin	KO	1 (6)	Aug 31, 1888	41 years, 336 days	Theatre Comique, Minneapolis, Minnesota, US	
40	Draw	20–13–5 (2)	Harris Martin	PTS	8	Aug 10, 1888	41 years, 315 days	Theatre Comique, Minneapolis, Minnesota, US	
39	Win	20–13–4 (2)	Strong Boy	KO	3 (?)	Feb 1, 1888	N/A	Donaldson, Louisiana, US	Date uncertain
38	Loss	19–13–4 (2)	Harris Martin	PTS	10	Apr 15, 1887	40 years, 197 days	Olympic Theater, Saint Paul, Minnesota, US	
37	Loss	19–12–4 (2)	Harry Woodson	PTS	10	Apr 11, 1887	40 years, 193 days	Olympic Theater, Saint Paul, Minnesota, US	
36	Loss	19–11–4 (2)	Harris Martin	PTS	8	Mar 25, 1887	40 years, 176 days	Comique Theater, Minneapolis, Minnesota, US	
35	Win	19–10–4 (2)	Frank Taylor	PTS	11	Feb 25, 1887	40 years, 148 days	Theatre Comique, Minneapolis, Minnesota, US	
34	Loss	18–10–4 (2)	Frank Taylor	KO	10 (10)	Jan 14, 1887	40 years, 106 days	Olympic Theater, Saint Paul, Minnesota, US	
33	Draw	18–9–4 (2)	Frank Taylor	PTS	15	Dec 31, 1886	40 years, 92 days	Theatre Comique, Minneapolis, Minnesota, US	
32	Loss	18–9–3 (2)	Frank Taylor	PTS	5	Dec 2, 1886	40 years, 63 days	Exposition Rink, Saint Paul, Minnesota, US	
31	Win	18–8–3 (2)	Ed Moehler	KO	5 (8)	Jun 6, 1886	39 years, 249 days	Silver Lake, Minnesota, US	
30	Loss	17–8–3 (2)	Patsy Mellen	PTS	5	May 16, 1886	39 years, 228 days	Market Hall, Saint Paul, Minnesota, US	
29	Win	17–7–3 (2)	Peter Follett	TKO	3 (?)	Mar 6, 1886	39 years, 157 days	Saint Paul, Minnesota, US	
28	Win	16–7–3 (2)	Billy Wilson	DQ	6 (?)	Jul 19, 1885	38 years, 292 days	Saint Paul, Minnesota, US	
27	Loss	15–7–3 (2)	Billy Wilson	PTS	4	May 30, 1885	38 years, 242 days	White Bear Lake, Minnesota, US	
26	Loss	15–6–3 (2)	Billy Wilson	KO	3 (?)	Mar 21, 1885	38 years, 172 days	Market Hall, Saint Paul, Minnesota, US	
25	Loss	15–5–3 (2)	Harry Woodson	KO	4 (?)	Dec 23, 1884	38 years, 84 days	Winnipeg, Manitoba, Canada	
24	Win	15–4–3 (2)	Jack Keefe	PTS	5	Mar 14, 1884	37 years, 166 days	Cleveland, Ohio, US	
23	Loss	14–4–3 (2)	Charles C. Smith	DQ	2 (?)	Feb 2, 1884	37 years, 125 days	East Saginaw, Michigan, US	
22	ND	14–3–3 (2)	Charles C. Smith	ND	4	Dec 15, 1883	N/A	East Saginaw, Michigan, US	Date uncertain
21	Win	14–3–3 (1)	Harry Woodson	PTS	?	Dec 8, 1883	37 years, 69 days	New York City, New York, US	
20	Win	13–3–3 (1)	Harry Woodson	PTS	?	Jul 1, 1883	N/A	New York City, New York, US	Won vacant black heavyweight title; Date uncertain
19	Loss	12–3–3 (1)	George Godfrey	KO	6 (6)	Feb 23, 1883	36 years, 146 days	Cribb Club, Boston, Massachusetts, US	Lost world colored heavyweight title
18	Loss	12–2–3 (1)	Harry Woodson	PTS	3	Feb 7, 1883	36 years, 130 days	New York, New York City, New York, US	
17	Draw	12–1–3 (1)	George Godfrey	PTS	6	Jan 18, 1883	36 years, 110 days	New York, New York City, New York, US	
16	Win	12–1–2 (1)	Harry Woodson	KO	2 (?)	Jan 10, 1883	36 years, 102 days	New York, New York City, New York, US	
15	Win	11–1–2 (1)	Morris Grant	KO	3 (4)	Dec 7, 1882	36 years, 68 days	Harry Hill's, New York, New York City, New York, US	Retained Police Gazette Medal Championship of America
14	Win	10–1–2 (1)	Morris Grant	KO	1 (?)	Dec 1, 1882	N/A	New York City, New York, US	Date uncertain
13	Win	9–1–2 (1)	Morris Grant	PTS	?	Nov 7, 1882	36 years, 38 days	New York City, New York, US	Won inaugural Police Gazette Medal Championship of America
12	Win	8–1–2 (1)	Frank Johnson	PTS	4	Jul 26, 1882	35 years, 299 days	New York City, New York, US	
11	Loss	7–1–2 (1)	Morris Grant	PTS	4	Jun 20, 1882	35 years, 263 days	New York City, New York, US	
10	ND	7–0–2 (1)	Morris Grant	ND	4	May 4, 1882	35 years, 216 days	New York City, New York, US	
9	Win	7–0–2	Morris Grant	KO	2 (?)	Apr 26, 1882	35 years, 208 days	New York City, New York, US	
8	Win	6–0–2	Morris Grant	KO	2 (?)	Apr 6, 1882	35 years, 188 days	New York City, New York, US	
7	Draw	5–0–2	George Godfrey	PTS	4	Jan 26, 1882	35 years, 118 days	Harry Hill's, New York City, New York, US	
6	Draw	5–0–1	Morris Grant	PTS	3	Jan 12, 1882	35 years, 104 days	Harry Hill's, New York City, New York, US	
5	Win	5–0	Morris Grant	PTS	1	Jan 1, 1882	N/A	New York City, New York, US	Date uncertain
4	Win	4–0	Morris Grant	PTS	3	Dec 1, 1881	N/A	New York City, New York, US	Date uncertain
3	Win	3–0	J.H. Brown	KO	3 (?)	Jun 3, 1881	34 years, 246 days	Bridgeport, Connecticut, US	
2	Win	2–0	Professor Anderson	KO	18 (?)	May 17, 1881	34 years, 229 days	Bridgeport, Connecticut, US	
1	Win	1–0	Morris Grant	PTS	3	Jan 14, 1881	34 years, 106 days	New York City, New York, US	Won vacant world colored heavyweight title

Awards and achievements
Preceded by Morris Grant	World Colored Heavyweight Champion; January 14, 1881 - February 23, 1883	Succeeded by George Godfrey
