= Gus Ruhlin =

American boxer

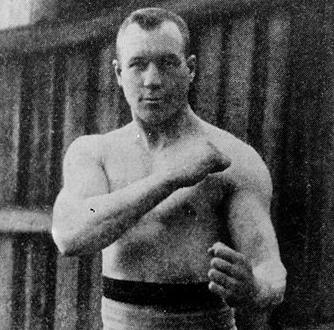
Gus Ruhlin

Gus Ruhlin ( January 8, 1872 – February 13 , 1912) was an American boxer. Known as the Akron Giant, He was known for his fights against James J. Jeffries, Tom Sharkey, Kid McCoy and Bob Fitzsimmons. Ruhlin retired with a 31-7-4 record with 20 knockouts. In 1912, at age 40, Ruhlin died of a stroke.

== Biography ==
Residing in Akron and standing at 6 feet 2 inches tall, Gus Ruhlin became known in the arenas as The Akron Giant. In 1897 Ruhlin fought James J. Jeffries to a draw. In 1898 he lost to Kid McCoy and Tom Sharkey, but defeated Joe Choynski. In 1900 Ruhlin defeated Tom Sharkey, but lost to Bob Fitzsimmons.

Ruhlin competed for the world heavyweight title when, in 1901, he had a rematch against champion James Jeffries. The fight ended with Jeffries' victory, in the interval between the fifth and sixth rounds, when Ruhlin gave up continuing the fight. In 1902 Ruhlin again defeated Tom Sharkey. In that same year Ruhlin was photographed for the book, "The Art of Boxing and Self-Defense" by Professor Mike Donovan, which depicted Ruhlin using the Cross-armed guard. In 1904 Ruhlin fought to a draw and lost to Marvin Hart.

After boxing, Ruhlin and his wife ran a café, popular with boxers. Ruhlin was also a champion of women's suffrage. In 1912, in Brooklyn, NY, Ruhlin died of a stroke at age 40.
