= Charles C. Smith (boxer) =

American boxer (1860?–1924)

C. C. Smith
Personal information
- Nickname: The Black Thunderbolt
- Nationality: American
- Born: Charles C. Smith; May 3, 1860 Macon, Georgia
- Died: October 1, 1924
- Height: 5 ft 11 in (1.80 m)
- Weight: Heavyweight

Boxing career

Boxing record
- Total fights: 66
- Wins: 40
- Win by KO: 32
- Losses: 14
- Draws: 5
- No contests: 7

C.C. Smith (May 3, 1860? – October 1, 1924), a.k.a. Charles C. Smith, Charles A.C. Smith, and Charlie Smith, was an African American boxer who claimed the status of being the World Colored Heavyweight Champ and was the first boxer recognized as such.

== Biography ==
Smith was born in Macon, Georgia, likely into slavery, and he and his mother moved north in 1865. His birth date is given as May 3, 1860, but since he supposedly did not begin boxing until he was 19 and claimed the title in 1876, the birth year likely is spurious. Some sources cite 1869 as the year his boxing career began, and others 1879, which would have been three years after he claimed the championship.

He began fighting as a bareknuckle boxer. The 5'11" Smith, whose moniker was "The Black Thunderbolt", fought as a heavyweight out of Buffalo, New York. Bill Muldoon, his manager, said he was a great pugilist possessed of cunning and a terrific punch. He reportedly fought 225 bouts.

In 1891, he traveled with Muldoon's traveling carnival, where he boxed with future lightweight champ Joe Gans, who was beginning his career. Gans would become the first African American to hold a world's championship boxing title.

Smith killed a man in the ring. On October 24, 1894, Amos Theis died of injuries inflicted by Smith during a bout in Louisville, Kentucky.

In 1903, when he was in his forties or fifties, he fought and defeated the former British Heavyweight champ, 40-year-old Jem Smith, in Manchester, Lancashire, England via a knockout. He reportedly fought Colored Heavyweight Champ (and future world heavyweight champ) Jack Johnson in Minneapolis, Minnesota in 1906, but it was likely an exhibition or never occurred due to Smith's age.

Smith's official record is 39 wins (33 by knockout) against 14 losses (he was KO-ed nine times) and five draws. He also recorded one newspaper decision win.

He died on October 1, 1924.

== Legacy ==
In 2020 award-winning author Mark Allen Baker published the first comprehensive account of The World Colored Heavyweight Championship, 1876–1937, with McFarland & Company, a leading independent publisher of academic & nonfiction books. This history traces the advent and demise of the Championship, the stories of the talented professional athletes who won it, and the demarcation of the color line both in and out of the ring.

For decades the World Colored Heavyweight Championship was a useful tool to combat racial oppression-the existence of the title as a leverage mechanism, or tool, used as a technique to counter a social element known as “drawing the color line.”

== Professional boxing record ==
66 fights	40 wins	14 losses
By knockout	32	9
By decision	6	2
By disqualification	2	3
Draws	5	
No contests	7	

No.	Result	Record	Opponent	Type	Round, time	Date	Location	Notes
66	Win	40–14–5 (7)	Contaden	KO	?	Jul 15, 1903	United States of America	Date & venue uncertain
65	Win	39–14–5 (7)	Jem Smith	KO	?	Jun 15, 1903	Manchester, England	Date uncertain
64	ND	38–14–5 (7)	Billy Rhodes	ND	4	Aug 15, 1901	Minneapolis, Minnesota, U.S.	Date uncertain
63	Loss	38–14–5 (6)	Jim Fitzpatrick	TKO	7 (20)	Oct 25, 1899	Olympic A.C., Buffalo, New York, U.S.	
62	Win	38–13–5 (6)	Tom McCarthy	DQ	3 (20)	Mar 6, 1899	Olympic A.C., Buffalo, New York, U.S.	
61	Loss	37–13–5 (6)	George Gardiner	KO	7 (?)	Dec 25, 1898	Montreal, Quebec, Canada	
60	Loss	37–12–5 (6)	Ed Dunkhorst	PTS	20	Nov 24, 1898	Maple Avenue A.C., Elmira, New York, U.S.	
59	Win	37–11–5 (6)	Johnny Ruhlin	PTS	4	Oct 15, 1898	Buffalo, New York, U.S.	Date uncertain
58	Loss	36–11–5 (6)	Peter Maher	KO	3 (6)	Feb 15, 1898	Arena A.C., Philadelphia, Pennsylvania, U.S.	
57	Win	36–10–5 (6)	Jim Delaney	KO	2 (?), 0:30	May 31, 1897	Maple Avenue A.C., Elmira, New York, U.S.	
56	Win	35–10–5 (6)	Fred Taylor	KO	1 (?)	May 10, 1897	Erie, Pennsylvania, U.S.	
55	Win	34–10–5 (6)	George Watson	KO	1 (20), 2:05	Mar 26, 1897	Walden A.C., Buffalo, New York, U.S.	
54	Loss	33–10–5 (6)	Peter Maher	PTS	6	Feb 15, 1897	Empire A.C., Buffalo, New York, U.S.	
53	Win	33–9–5 (6)	Al Murphy	PTS	3	Nov 20, 1896	Music Hall, Niagara Falls, New York, U.S.	
52	Win	32–9–5 (6)	Mike Queenan	TKO	2 (20)	Aug 6, 1896	Park Theater, Niagara Falls, New York, U.S.	
51	Win	31–9–5 (6)	Amos Thesis	KO	?	Oct 24, 1894	Louisville, Kentucky, U.S.	Thesis died of injuries sustained from the fight.
50	Loss	30–9–5 (6)	Jack Slattery	DQ	5 (?)	Jan 11, 1894	Dolgeville, New York, U.S.	
49	ND	30–8–5 (6)	John Hughes	ND	4	Sep 5, 1893	New York City, New York, U.S.	
48	Draw	30–8–5 (5)	Con Riordon	PTS	4	Jul 4, 1893	New York City, New York, U.S.	
47	Win	30–8–4 (5)	Jerry Slattery	KO	1 (?)	Jun 15, 1893	United States of America	Date & venue uncertain
46	Loss	29–8–4 (5)	Con Coughlin	DQ	3 (?)	Apr 15, 1893	New York City, New York, U.S.	
45	Win	29–7–4 (5)	John Jackson	KO	1 (?)	Apr 14, 1893	New York City, New York, U.S.	
44	Win	28–7–4 (5)	Con Coughlin	KO	1 (?)	Apr 13, 1893	New York City, New York, U.S.	Date uncertain
43	Win	27–7–4 (5)	Mike Brennan	DQ	3 (6)	Nov 26, 1892	New York A.C., New York City, New York, U.S.	
42	Loss	26–7–4 (5)	Joe Choynski	KO	4 (?)	Nov 21, 1892	Philadelphia, Pennsylvania, U.S.	
41	Win	26–6–4 (5)	Mike Brennan	KO	3 (?)	Nov 5, 1892	New York City, New York, U.S.	
40	Loss	25–6–4 (5)	Joe Butler	KO	3 (?)	Oct 5, 1892	Washington, D.C., U.S.	Date uncertain
39	Win	25–5–4 (5)	Frank Craig	KO	2 (?)	Sep 12, 1892	New York City, New York, U.S.	
38	ND	24–5–4 (5)	Frank Craig	ND	4	Aug 29, 1892	New York City, New York, U.S.	
37	Loss	24–5–4 (4)	George Godfrey	KO	4 (?)	Aug 15, 1892	New York City, New York, U.S.	
36	Win	24–4–4 (4)	Bill Gabig	TKO	2 (4)	Apr 25, 1892	Niblo's Theatre, New York City, New York, U.S.	
35	Win	23–4–4 (4)	Billy Baker	KO	9 (?)	Sep 1, 1891	New York City, New York, U.S.	Date uncertain
34	Loss	22–4–4 (4)	Billy Baker	PTS	9	Jul 1, 1891	United States of America	Date & venue uncertain
33	ND	22–3–4 (4)	Fred Morris	ND	6	May 15, 1891	United States of America	Date & venue uncertain
32	Draw	22–3–4 (3)	George Godfrey	PTS	6	Jan 15, 1885	Boston, Massachusetts, U.S.	Date uncertain
31	Win	22–3–3 (3)	Edward McKeown	KO	2 (?)	Nov 20, 1884	Winnipeg, Manitoba, Canada	
30	NC	21–3–3 (3)	Big Sullivan	NC	1 (?)	Oct 27, 1884	Market Hall, Saint Paul, Minnesota, U.S.	
29	Loss	21–3–3 (2)	Tom Robinson	KO	1 (?)	Mar 18, 1884	Cleveland, Ohio, U.S.	
28	Loss	21–2–3 (2)	Mervine Thompson	KO	8 (?)	Mar 10, 1884	Central Armory, Cleveland, Ohio, U.S.	
27	Win	21–1–3 (2)	Charles Hadley	DQ	2 (?)	Feb 2, 1884	East Saginaw, Michigan, U.S.	
26	ND	20–1–3 (2)	Charles Hadley	ND	4	Dec 15, 1883	East Saginaw, Michigan, U.S.	Date uncertain
25	Draw	20–1–3 (1)	Tommy Cleary	PTS	6	Nov 15, 1883	Amsterdam, New York, U.S.	Date uncertain
24	Draw	20–1–2 (1)	Jack Stewart	PTS	6	Oct 5, 1883	London, Ontario, Canada	
23	Loss	20–1–1 (1)	Jack Stewart	TKO	2 (6), 2:25	Aug 16, 1883	Harry Hill's, New York City, New York, U.S.	
22	ND	20–0–1 (1)	Harry Woodson	ND	3	Jul 16, 1883	Troy, New York, U.S.	
21	Win	20–0–1	Thomas McAlpine	PTS	4	Apr 18, 1883	Schenectady, New York, U.S.	
20	Win	19–0–1	W. Shipman	KO	?	Apr 17, 1883	Albany, New York, U.S.	Date uncertain
19	Win	18–0–1	Professor Corlin	KO	?	Apr 16, 1883	Albany, New York, U.S.	Date uncertain
18	Win	17–0–1	Amos Lavender	KO	?	Apr 15, 1883	Albany, New York, U.S.	Date uncertain
17	Draw	16–0–1	Professor John Donaldson	PTS	4	Nov 14, 1882	Port Huron, Michigan, U.S.	
16	Win	16–0	Dan Carr	KO	8 (?)	Jan 15, 1882	East Saginaw, Michigan, U.S.	Date uncertain
15	Win	15–0	Dan Carr	KO	4 (?)	Nov 11, 1881	Bay City, Michigan, U.S.	
14	Win	14–0	Bill Johnson	KO	2 (?)	Aug 15, 1881	East Saginaw, Michigan, U.S.	Date uncertain
13	Win	13–0	Professor John Donaldson	KO	4 (?)	Jun 15, 1881	Saginaw, Michigan, U.S.	Date uncertain
12	Win	12–0	Maurice Casey	PTS	4	Mar 15, 1881	Ann Arbor, Michigan, U.S.	Date uncertain
11	Win	11–0	Joseph Massie	KO	8 (?)	Nov 16, 1879	Pittsburgh, Pennsylvania, U.S.	
10	Win	10–0	Jack Chapel	KO	12 (?)	Aug 15, 1879	Bedford, Ohio, U.S.	Date uncertain
9	Win	9–0	Jim Whalen	KO	23 (?)	Jul 12, 1879	Elizabethtown, Pennsylvania, U.S.	
8	Win	8–0	Jack Silver Bill Driscoll	KO	3 (?)	Jun 29, 1879	Saginaw, Michigan, U.S.	Date uncertain
7	Win	7–0	Steve Taylor	KO	14 (?)	Jun 22, 1879	United States of America	Date & venue uncertain
6	Win	6–0	Mike Green	KO	29 (?)	Jun 15, 1879	Boston A.A., Boston, Massachusetts	Date uncertain
5	Win	5–0	Mervine Thompson	PTS	3	May 15, 1879	United States of America	Date & venue uncertain
4	Win	4–0	William Spillings	KO	?	Apr 15, 1879	United States of America	Date & venue uncertain
3	Win	3–0	Battler Stevenson	KO	?	Mar 15, 1879	United States of America	Date & venue uncertain
2	Win	2–0	Ed Gray	KO	?	Feb 15, 1879	United States of America	Date & venue uncertain
1	Win	1–0	Welsh	KO	?	Jan 15, 1879	United States of America	Professional debut; Date & venue uncertain

Awards and achievements
Preceded by New Title	World Colored Heavyweight Champion; 1876 - 1878	Succeeded by Morris Grant
