= Joe Choynski =

American boxer (1868–1943)

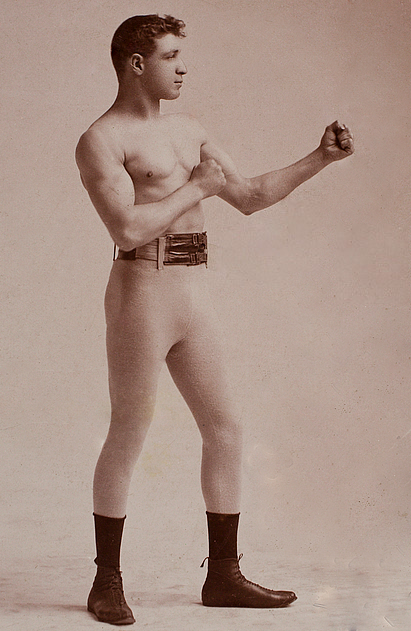

Personal information
- Nicknames: "The California Terror" "Little Joe" "Chrysanthemum" Joe
- Born: Joseph Bartlett Choynski; November 8, 1868 San Francisco, California, United States
- Died: January 25, 1943 (aged 74) Cincinnati, Ohio, United States
- Height: 6 ft 0 1/2 in (1.84 m)
- Weight: Heavyweight

Boxing career
- Stance: Orthodox

Boxing record
- Total fights: 86
- Wins: 59
- Win by KO: 39
- Losses: 17
- Draws: 6
- No contests: 4

Joseph Bartlett Choynski (/ˈtʃɔɪnski/; November 8, 1868 – January 24, 1943) was an American boxer who fought professionally from 1888 to 1904.

Choynski is known for knocking out world heavyweight champions Jack Johnson and Peter Maher in non-title bouts, and drawing against world heavyweight champions James J. Jeffries, Bob Fitzsimmons, Marvin Hart and Tom Sharkey. He also fought notable fights against James J. Corbett, Gus Ruhlin, Barbados Joe Walcott, George Godfrey and Kid McCoy.

Choynski was nicknamed “Chrysanthemum Joe”, reportedly inspired by his long, flowing hair, an eccentric trait for a boxer of his time.

== Boxing career ==
"Chrysanthemum Joe", the son of a Jewish Polish immigrant who settled in California in 1867, weighed no more than 176 lb (80 kg) throughout his career but regularly fought heavyweights. He was considered a heavy puncher and a dangerous fighter.

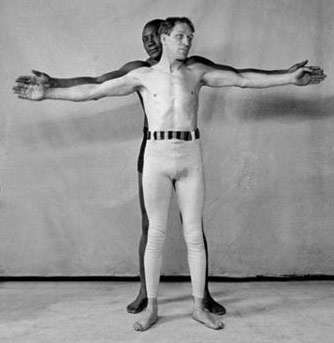
Jack Johnson standing behind Joe Choynski. 1909 Chicago Daily News photo

In fact, James J. Jeffries claimed that the hardest blow he ever received in a bout came from Choynski during their 20-round draw. During that bout, Choynski hit Jeffries with a right hand so powerful that the punch drove one of Jeffries' teeth into his lip. The tooth was lodged so deeply that one of Jeffries' cornermen was forced to cut it out with a knife between rounds.

A contemporary of heavyweight champion "Gentleman Jim" (James J. Corbett), the two fought professionally three times. Both were from the San Francisco area, and thus generated a lot of local interest in their rivalry. The highlight of their series of bouts was fought on June 5, 1889, on a barge off the coast of Benicia, California.

The principals agreed that the bout was to be fought wearing two ounce gloves. Corbett had apparently hurt his hand, and Choynski learned of the injury. Accordingly, Choynski "forgot" to bring his gloves to the match, thereby hoping the fight would proceed as a bare-knuckle bout. Corbett, however, declined to fight bare-knuckle, but agreed to allow Choynski to wear leather riding gloves borrowed from a spectator. The riding gloves were seamed, and caused Corbett to suffer many cuts and welts. Nevertheless, Corbett won the legendary bout when he KOed Choynski in the 27th round.

In 1892 he KOd a 39-year-old legend in Boston's George Godfrey.

Choynski was never given an opportunity to fight for the heavyweight title, but enjoyed some stunning successes against famed heavyweights James J. Jeffries and Jack Johnson before they became champions. For example, he held the heavier, larger, and stronger Jeffries to a 20-round draw on November 30, 1892. On February 25, 1901, he faced and KO'ed the young Jack Johnson in three rounds. He then began to train Johnson, helping the younger man develop the style that enabled him to become world champion.

Choynski also fought six-round draws with two other men who later claimed the heavyweight championship of the world: Bob Fitzsimmons on June 17, 1894, and Marvin Hart on November 16, 1903.

== Personal life ==
Choynski was born in San Francisco to a Jewish family, the son of Harriet (née Ashim) and Isidor Nathan Choynski. He had 4 siblings, Herbert, Miriam, Maurice, and Edwin.

In 1895, Choynski married Louise Anderson Miller, an actress, in Cincinnati, Ohio.

== Halls of Fame ==
In 1998, Choynski’s ability and ring-record were officially recognised by his induction into the International Boxing Hall of Fame.

Choynski, who was Jewish, was inducted into the International Jewish Sports Hall of Fame in 1991.

== Professional boxing record ==
All information in this section is derived from BoxRec, unless otherwise stated.

=== Official record ===
86 fights	57 wins	14 losses
By knockout	39	10
By decision	15	4
By disqualification	3	0
Draws	6	
No contests	4	
Newspaper decisions/draws	5	

All newspaper decisions are officially regarded as “no decision” bouts and are not counted in the win/loss/draw column.

No.	Result	Record	Opponent	Type	Round	Date	Location	Notes
86	Win	57–14–6 (9)	Jack Williams	NWS	6	Nov 21, 1904	Washington S.C., Philadelphia, Pennsylvania, U.S.	
85	Loss	57–14–6 (8)	Kid Carter	KO	1 (15)	Jan 19, 1904	Criterion A.C., Boston, Massachusetts, U.S.	
84	Loss	57–13–6 (8)	Marvin Hart	NWS	6	Nov 16, 1903	Washington S.C., Philadelphia, Pennsylvania, U.S.	
83	Win	57–13–6 (7)	Nick Burley	KO	7 (10)	Aug 7, 1903	D.A.A.A. Rink, Dawson City, Yukon Territory, Canada	
82	Loss	56–13–6 (7)	Nick Burley	KO	2 (10)	Jun 25, 1903	D.A.A.A. Rink, Dawson City, Yukon Territory, Canada	
81	Loss	56–12–6 (7)	Philadelphia Jack O'Brien	NWS	6	Mar 30, 1903	Washington S.C., Philadelphia, Pennsylvania, U.S.	
80	Win	56–12–6 (6)	Peter Maher	KO	2 (6)	Jan 26, 1903	Washington S.C., Philadelphia, Pennsylvania, U.S.	
79	Win	55–12–6 (6)	Frank Childs	PTS	6	Dec 1, 1901	Lyceum A.C., Chicago, Illinois, U.S.	
78	Loss	54–12–6 (6)	Philadelphia Jack O'Brien	PTS	6	Sep 29, 1901	America A.C., Chicago, Illinois, U.S.	
77	Win	54–11–6 (6)	Al Weinig	KO	6 (20)	May 2, 1901	Music Hall, Louisville, Kentucky, U.S.	
76	Loss	53–11–6 (6)	Kid Carter	KO	1 (6)	Mar 24, 1901	American A.C., Chicago, Illinois, U.S.	Lost American light-heavyweight title
75	Win	53–10–6 (6)	Wild Bill Hanrahan	KO	5 (20)	Mar 7, 1901	Music Hall, Louisville, Kentucky, U.S.	Claimed vacant American light-heavyweight title
74	Win	52–10–6 (6)	Jack Johnson	KO	3 (20)	Feb 25, 1901	Harmony Hall, Galveston, Texas, U.S.	
73	Win	51–10–6 (6)	Fred Russell	DQ	4 (10)	Nov 2, 1900	Colorado A.C., Denver, Colorado, U.S.	
72	Win	50–10–6 (6)	John Matthews	PTS	3	Aug 8, 1900	Dayton, Ohio, U.S.	
71	Win	49–10–6 (6)	Jimmy Smith	KO	2 (?)	Aug 8, 1900	Dayton, Ohio, U.S.	
70	Loss	48–10–6 (6)	Tom Sharkey	TKO	3 (6)	May 8, 1900	Tattersall's, Chicago, Illinois, U.S.	
69	Loss	48–9–6 (6)	Barbados Joe Walcott	TKO	7 (25)	Feb 23, 1900	Broadway A.C., Manhattan, New York City, New York, U.S.	
68	Win	48–8–6 (6)	Peter Maher	PTS	6	Feb 16, 1900	2nd Regiment Armory, Chicago, Illinois, U.S.	
67	Win	47–8–6 (6)	M Woods	RTD	2 (?)	Feb 11, 1900	Chicago, Illinois, U.S.	
66	Loss	46–8–6 (6)	Charles Kid McCoy	RTD	4 (25)	Jan 12, 1900	Broadway A.C., Brooklyn, New York City, New York, U.S.	
65	Win	46–7–6 (6)	Tom Carey	KO	2 (15)	Nov 4, 1899	Olympic A.C., Cincinnati, Ohio, U.S.	
64	Win	45–7–6 (6)	Steve O'Donnell	KO	6 (6)	Oct 27, 1899	Star Theatre, Chicago, Illinois, U.S.	
63	Win	44–7–6 (6)	Dick Moore	KO	3 (20)	Oct 23, 1899	St. Louis A.C., Saint Louis, Missouri, U.S.	
62	Win	43–7–6 (6)	Australian Jim Ryan	KO	7 (20)	Oct 20, 1899	Broadway A.C., Brooklyn, New York City, New York, U.S.	
61	Draw	42–7–6 (6)	Charles Kid McCoy	PTS	6	Oct 6, 1899	Star Theatre, Chicago, Illinois, U.S.	
60	NC	42–7–5 (6)	Ed Dunkhorst	NC	? (20)	Sep 30, 1899	Colorado A.A., Denver, Colorado, U.S.	Bout Scheduled as finale of Colorado Sporting Festival. No result found
59	Win	42–7–5 (5)	Jim Hall	KO	3 (20)	Sep 25, 1899	Nonpareil A.C., Louisville, Kentucky, U.S.	Retained world light-heavyweight title
58	Win	41–7–5 (5)	Australian Jim Ryan	PTS	20	Aug 29, 1899	Auditorium for fistic carnival, Dubuque, Iowa, U.S.	Won inaugural world light-heavyweight title
57	Win	40–7–5 (5)	Mexican Pete Everett	DQ	7 (25)	Aug 4, 1899	Colorado A.A., Denver, Colorado, U.S.	
56	Win	39–7–5 (5)	Jack McCormick	PTS	6	Jul 21, 1899	Dearborn A.C., Chicago, Illinois, U.S.	
55	ND	38–7–5 (5)	Willard Bean	ND	10	Apr 17, 1899	New Grand Theatre, Salt Lake City, Utah, U.S.	
54	Loss	38–7–5 (4)	Charles Kid McCoy	PTS	20	Mar 24, 1899	Mechanic's Pavilion, San Francisco, California, U.S.	
53	Win	38–6–5 (4)	Ed Dunkhorst	PTS	6	Dec 19, 1898	Fort Dearborn A.C., Chicago, Illinois, U.S.	
52	Loss	37–6–5 (4)	Gus Ruhlin	PTS	6	Nov 4, 1898	Arena A.C., Philadelphia, Pennsylvania, U.S.	
51	Win	37–5–5 (4)	Joe Goddard	NWS	6	Sep 12, 1898	Arena A.C., Philadelphia, Pennsylvania, U.S.	
50	Draw	37–5–5 (3)	Tom Sharkey	PTS	8 (20)	Mar 11, 1898	Woodward's Pavilion, San Francisco, California, U.S.	Choynski fell out of the ring and the fight was declared a draw
49	Draw	37–5–4 (3)	James J. Jeffries	PTS	20	Nov 30, 1897	National A.C., San Francisco, California, U.S.	
48	Win	37–5–3 (3)	Herman Bernau	TKO	4 (6)	Oct 11, 1897	Grand Opera House, Galveston, Texas, U.S.	
47	Win	36–5–3 (3)	Denver Ed Smith	DQ	4 (20)	May 10, 1897	Broadway A.C., Brooklyn, New York City, New York, U.S.	
46	Win	35–5–3 (3)	Frank Dwyer	PTS	4	Jan 2, 1897	Allegheny Theater, Pittsburgh, Pennsylvania, U.S.	
45	Loss	34–5–3 (3)	Peter Maher	KO	6 (20)	Nov 16, 1896	Broadway A.C., Manhattan, New York City, New York, U.S.	
44	Win	34–4–3 (3)	Joe McAuliffe	KO	4 (10)	Aug 28, 1896	Woodward's Pavilion, San Francisco, California, U.S.	
43	Loss	33–4–3 (3)	Tom Sharkey	PTS	8	Apr 16, 1896	People's Palace Theater, San Francisco, California, U.S.	
42	Win	33–3–3 (3)	Jim Hall	KO	13 (20)	Jan 20, 1896	Empire A.C., Maspeth, Queens, New York City, New York, U.S.	
41	Win	32–3–3 (3)	Frank Childs	KO	3 (3)	Nov 15, 1895	Sam T. Jack's Opera House, Chicago, Illinois, U.S.	
40	Win	31–3–3 (3)	Dick Wilson	KO	2 (?)	Aug 20, 1895	Louisville, Kentucky, U.S.	
39	Win	30–3–3 (3)	Jack Cattanach	KO	2 (10)	Jun 3, 1895	Front Street Theater, Baltimore, Maryland, U.S.	
38	Draw	29–3–3 (3)	Dan Creedon	PTS	6	Mar 21, 1895	Tattersall's, Chicago, Illinois, U.S.	Pre-arranged draw if no KO
37	Win	29–3–2 (3)	Mike Madden	PTS	4	Mar 11, 1895	Auditorium, Kansas City, Missouri, U.S.	
36	Win	28–3–2 (3)	Jim Douglass	PTS	3	Feb 25, 1895	Triangle AC, Chicago, Illinois, U.S.	
35	Draw	27–3–2 (3)	Bob Armstrong	PTS	6	Sep 19, 1894	Chicago, Illinois, U.S.	
34	Win	27–3–1 (3)	Mike Boden	KO	3 (4)	Sep 17, 1894	Tattersall's, Chicago, Illinois, U.S.	
33	Win	26–3–1 (3)	Harry Miller	RTD	3 (6)	Sep 15, 1894	People's Theater, Cincinnati, Ohio, U.S.	
32	Draw	25–3–1 (3)	Bob Fitzsimmons	PTS	5 (8)	Jun 18, 1894	Boston Theater, Boston, Massachusetts, U.S.	Choynski was down and bloodied when the police stepped in and would likely have been knocked out had the fight continued The bout was declared a draw. Pre-fight agreement that the fight could only be won via KO
31	Win	25–3 (3)	Tommy West	PTS	3	Feb 6, 1893	Portland, Oregon, U.S.	
30	Win	24–3 (3)	Mike Boden	KO	4 (?)	Dec 29, 1892	Chicago, Illinois, U.S.	
29	Win	23–3 (3)	Bob Ferguson	PTS	4	Dec 29, 1892	Chicago, Illinois, U.S.	
28	Win	22–3 (3)	Jack Fallon	KO	4 (?)	Nov 26, 1892	Ariel A.C., Philadelphia, Pennsylvania, U.S.	
27	Win	21–3 (3)	Denny Kelliher	PTS	2	Nov 24, 1892	Philadelphia, Pennsylvania, U.S.	
26	Win	20–3 (3)	Charles C. Smith	KO	4 (?)	Nov 21, 1892	Philadelphia, Pennsylvania, U.S.	
25	Win	19–3 (3)	George Godfrey	KO	15 (?)	Oct 31, 1892	Coney Island A.C., Coney Island, New York, U.S.	
24	Win	18–3 (3)	Jack Hart	PTS	3	May 29, 1892	London, England, U.K.	
23	Win	17–3 (3)	William Patmore	KO	1 (?)	May 27, 1892	London, England, U.K.	
22	Win	16–3 (3)	Mike Horrigan	KO	1 (?)	May 24, 1892	London, England, U.K.	
21	Win	15–3 (3)	Denver Ed Smith	PTS	4	Apr 30, 1892	Ariel A.C., Philadelphia, Pennsylvania, U.S.	
20	Win	14–3 (3)	Philadelphia Tommy Ryan	KO	2 (?)	Apr 22, 1892	Niblo's Theatre, Manhattan, New York City, New York, U.S.	Not to be confused with Tommy Ryan
19	Win	13–3 (3)	Charles Bull McCarthy	KO	2 (?)	Apr 21, 1892	Clermont Rink, Manhattan, New York City, New York, U.S.	
18	Win	12–3 (3)	Jerry Slattery	KO	2 (?)	Apr 19, 1892	Niblo's Theatre, Manhattan, New York City, New York, U.S.	
17	Win	11–3 (3)	Joe Godfrey	KO	1 (?)	Apr 9, 1892	Philadelphia, Pennsylvania, U.S.	
16	Loss	10–3 (3)	Jim Hall	NWS	4	Apr 2, 1892	Chicago, Illinois, U.S.	
15	Win	10–3 (2)	Billy Woods	KO	34 (?)	Dec 17, 1891	Pacific A.C., San Francisco, California, U.S.	
14	Loss	9–3 (2)	Joe Goddard	KO	4 (20)	Jul 20, 1891	Melbourne Athletic Club, Melbourne, Victoria, Australia	For Australian heavyweight title
13	Win	9–2 (2)	Owen Sullivan	KO	2 (8)	Jun 20, 1891	Melbourne Athletic Club, Melbourne, Victoria, Australia	
12	Win	8–2 (2)	Mick Dooley	KO	2	May 25, 1891	Melbourne Athletic Club, Melbourne, Victoria, Australia	A finish fight
11	Loss	7–2 (2)	Joe Goddard	RTD	4 (20)	Feb 10, 1891	Sydney Amateur Gymnastic Club, Sydney, New South Wales, Australia	For Australian heavyweight title
10	Win	7–1 (2)	Jim Fogarty	RTD	10	Nov 24, 1890	Australian AC, Darlinghurst, New South Wales, Australia	A finish fight
9	Win	6–1 (2)	Jack Davies	KO	9 (?)	May 26, 1890	Occidental A.C., San Francisco, California, U.S.	
8	Win	5–1 (2)	Billy Wilson	KO	2 (?)	Mar 26, 1890	Golden Gate A.C., San Francisco, California, U.S.	
7	Win	4–1 (2)	Frank McLarney	KO	2 (?)	Jan 25, 1890	Portland, Oregon, U.S.	
6	ND	3–1 (2)	Billy McCarthy	ND	4	Aug 27, 1889	California A.C., San Francisco, California, U.S.	
5	Loss	3–1 (1)	James J. Corbett	KO	27 (?)	Jun 5, 1889	Benicia Harbor, California, U.S.	
4	NC	3–0 (1)	James J. Corbett	NC	4 (?)	May 30, 1889	San Francisco, California, U.S.	Bout stopped by the police
3	Win	3–0	Frank Glover	KO	14	Feb 26, 1889	San Francisco, California, U.S.	A finish fight
2	Win	2–0	H McDonald	PTS	3	Dec 26, 1888	San Francisco, California, U.S.	
1	Win	1–0	George Bush	KO	2 (?)	Nov 14, 1888	San Francisco, California, U.S.	

=== Unofficial record ===
86 fights	59 wins	17 losses
By knockout	39	10
By decision	17	7
By disqualification	3	0
Draws	6	
No contests	4	

Record with the inclusion of newspaper decisions in the win/loss/draw column.

No.	Result	Record	Opponent	Type	Round	Date	Location	Notes
86	Win	59–17–6 (4)	Jack Williams	NWS	6	Nov 21, 1904	Washington S.C., Philadelphia, Pennsylvania, U.S.	
85	Loss	58–17–6 (4)	Kid Carter	KO	1 (15)	Jan 19, 1904	Criterion A.C., Boston, Massachusetts, U.S.	
84	Loss	58–16–6 (4)	Marvin Hart	NWS	6	Nov 16, 1903	Washington S.C., Philadelphia, Pennsylvania, U.S.	
83	Win	58–15–6 (4)	Nick Burley	KO	7 (10)	Aug 7, 1903	D.A.A.A. Rink, Dawson City, Yukon Territory, Canada	
82	Loss	57–15–6 (4)	Nick Burley	KO	2 (10)	Jun 25, 1903	D.A.A.A. Rink, Dawson City, Yukon Territory, Canada	
81	Loss	57–14–6 (4)	Philadelphia Jack O'Brien	NWS	6	Mar 30, 1903	Washington S.C., Philadelphia, Pennsylvania, U.S.	
80	Win	57–13–6 (4)	Peter Maher	KO	2 (6)	Jan 26, 1903	Washington S.C., Philadelphia, Pennsylvania, U.S.	
79	Win	56–13–6 (4)	Frank Childs	PTS	6	Dec 1, 1901	Lyceum A.C., Chicago, Illinois, U.S.	
78	Loss	55–13–6 (4)	Philadelphia Jack O'Brien	PTS	6	Sep 29, 1901	America A.C., Chicago, Illinois, U.S.	
77	Win	55–12–6 (4)	Al Weinig	KO	6 (20)	May 2, 1901	Music Hall, Louisville, Kentucky, U.S.	
76	Loss	54–12–6 (4)	Kid Carter	KO	1 (6)	Mar 24, 1901	American A.C., Chicago, Illinois, U.S.	Lost American light-heavyweight title
75	Win	54–11–6 (4)	Wild Bill Hanrahan	KO	5 (20)	Mar 7, 1901	Music Hall, Louisville, Kentucky, U.S.	Claimed vacant American light-heavyweight title
74	Win	53–11–6 (4)	Jack Johnson	KO	3 (20)	Feb 25, 1901	Harmony Hall, Galveston, Texas, U.S.	
73	Win	52–11–6 (4)	Fred Russell	DQ	4 (10)	Nov 2, 1900	Colorado A.C., Denver, Colorado, U.S.	
72	Win	51–11–6 (4)	John Matthews	PTS	3	Aug 8, 1900	Dayton, Ohio, U.S.	
71	Win	50–11–6 (4)	Jimmy Smith	KO	2 (?)	Aug 8, 1900	Dayton, Ohio, U.S.	
70	Loss	49–11–6 (4)	Tom Sharkey	TKO	3 (6)	May 8, 1900	Tattersall's, Chicago, Illinois, U.S.	
69	Loss	49–10–6 (4)	Barbados Joe Walcott	TKO	7 (25)	Feb 23, 1900	Broadway A.C., Manhattan, New York City, New York, U.S.	
68	Win	49–9–6 (4)	Peter Maher	PTS	6	Feb 16, 1900	2nd Regiment Armory, Chicago, Illinois, U.S.	
67	Win	48–9–6 (4)	M Woods	RTD	2 (?)	Feb 11, 1900	Chicago, Illinois, U.S.	
66	Loss	47–9–6 (4)	Charles Kid McCoy	RTD	4 (25)	Jan 12, 1900	Broadway A.C., Brooklyn, New York City, New York, U.S.	
65	Win	47–8–6 (4)	Tom Carey	KO	2 (15)	Nov 4, 1899	Olympic A.C., Cincinnati, Ohio, U.S.	
64	Win	46–8–6 (4)	Steve O'Donnell	KO	6 (6)	Oct 27, 1899	Star Theatre, Chicago, Illinois, U.S.	
63	Win	45–8–6 (4)	Dick Moore	KO	3 (20)	Oct 23, 1899	St. Louis A.C., Saint Louis, Missouri, U.S.	
62	Win	44–8–6 (4)	Australian Jim Ryan	KO	7 (20)	Oct 20, 1899	Broadway A.C., Brooklyn, New York City, New York, U.S.	
61	Draw	43–8–6 (4)	Charles Kid McCoy	PTS	6	Oct 6, 1899	Star Theatre, Chicago, Illinois, U.S.	
60	NC	43–8–5 (4)	Ed Dunkhorst	NC	? (20)	Sep 30, 1899	Colorado A.A., Denver, Colorado, U.S.	Bout Scheduled as finale of Colorado Sporting Festival. No result found
59	Win	43–8–5 (3)	Jim Hall	KO	3 (20)	Sep 25, 1899	Nonpareil A.C., Louisville, Kentucky, U.S.	Retained world light-heavyweight title
58	Win	42–8–5 (3)	Australian Jim Ryan	PTS	20	Aug 29, 1899	Auditorium for fistic carnival, Dubuque, Iowa, U.S.	Won inaugural world light-heavyweight title
57	Win	41–8–5 (3)	Mexican Pete Everett	DQ	7 (25)	Aug 4, 1899	Colorado A.A., Denver, Colorado, U.S.	
56	Win	40–8–5 (3)	Jack McCormick	PTS	6	Jul 21, 1899	Dearborn A.C., Chicago, Illinois, U.S.	
55	ND	39–8–5 (3)	Willard Bean	ND	10	Apr 17, 1899	New Grand Theatre, Salt Lake City, Utah, U.S.	
54	Loss	39–8–5 (2)	Charles Kid McCoy	PTS	20	Mar 24, 1899	Mechanic's Pavilion, San Francisco, California, U.S.	
53	Win	39–7–5 (2)	Ed Dunkhorst	PTS	6	Dec 19, 1898	Fort Dearborn A.C., Chicago, Illinois, U.S.	
52	Loss	38–7–5 (2)	Gus Ruhlin	PTS	6	Nov 4, 1898	Arena A.C., Philadelphia, Pennsylvania, U.S.	
51	Win	38–6–5 (2)	Joe Goddard	NWS	6	Sep 12, 1898	Arena A.C., Philadelphia, Pennsylvania, U.S.	
50	Draw	37–6–5 (2)	Tom Sharkey	PTS	8 (20)	Mar 11, 1898	Woodward's Pavilion, San Francisco, California, U.S.	Choynski fell out of the ring and the fight was declared a draw
49	Draw	37–6–4 (2)	James J. Jeffries	PTS	20	Nov 30, 1897	National A.C., San Francisco, California, U.S.	
48	Win	37–6–3 (2)	Herman Bernau	TKO	4 (6)	Oct 11, 1897	Grand Opera House, Galveston, Texas, U.S.	
47	Win	36–6–3 (2)	Denver Ed Smith	DQ	4 (20)	May 10, 1897	Broadway A.C., Brooklyn, New York City, New York, U.S.	
46	Win	35–6–3 (2)	Frank Dwyer	PTS	4	Jan 2, 1897	Allegheny Theater, Pittsburgh, Pennsylvania, U.S.	
45	Loss	34–6–3 (2)	Peter Maher	KO	6 (20)	Nov 16, 1896	Broadway A.C., Manhattan, New York City, New York, U.S.	
44	Win	34–5–3 (2)	Joe McAuliffe	KO	4 (10)	Aug 28, 1896	Woodward's Pavilion, San Francisco, California, U.S.	
43	Loss	33–5–3 (2)	Tom Sharkey	PTS	8	Apr 16, 1896	People's Palace Theater, San Francisco, California, U.S.	
42	Win	33–4–3 (2)	Jim Hall	KO	13 (20)	Jan 20, 1896	Empire A.C., Maspeth, Queens, New York City, New York, U.S.	
41	Win	32–4–3 (2)	Frank Childs	KO	3 (3)	Nov 15, 1895	Sam T. Jack's Opera House, Chicago, Illinois, U.S.	
40	Win	31–4–3 (2)	Dick Wilson	KO	2 (?)	Aug 20, 1895	Louisville, Kentucky, U.S.	
39	Win	30–4–3 (2)	Jack Cattanach	KO	2 (10)	Jun 3, 1895	Front Street Theater, Baltimore, Maryland, U.S.	
38	Draw	29–4–3 (2)	Dan Creedon	PTS	6	Mar 21, 1895	Tattersall's, Chicago, Illinois, U.S.	Pre-arranged draw if no KO
37	Win	29–4–2 (2)	Mike Madden	PTS	4	Mar 11, 1895	Auditorium, Kansas City, Missouri, U.S.	
36	Win	28–4–2 (2)	Jim Douglass	PTS	3	Feb 25, 1895	Triangle AC, Chicago, Illinois, U.S.	
35	Draw	27–4–2 (2)	Bob Armstrong	PTS	6	Sep 19, 1894	Chicago, Illinois, U.S.	
34	Win	27–4–1 (2)	Mike Boden	KO	3 (4)	Sep 17, 1894	Tattersall's, Chicago, Illinois, U.S.	
33	Win	26–4–1 (2)	Harry Miller	RTD	3 (6)	Sep 15, 1894	People's Theater, Cincinnati, Ohio, U.S.	
32	Draw	25–4–1 (2)	Bob Fitzsimmons	PTS	5 (8)	Jun 18, 1894	Boston Theater, Boston, Massachusetts, U.S.	Choynski was down and bloodied when the police stepped in and would likely have been knocked out had the fight continued The bout was declared a draw. Pre-fight agreement that the fight could only be won via KO
31	Win	25–4 (2)	Tommy West	PTS	3	Feb 6, 1893	Portland, Oregon, U.S.	
30	Win	24–4 (2)	Mike Boden	KO	4 (?)	Dec 29, 1892	Chicago, Illinois, U.S.	
29	Win	23–4 (2)	Bob Ferguson	PTS	4	Dec 29, 1892	Chicago, Illinois, U.S.	
28	Win	22–4 (2)	Jack Fallon	KO	4 (?)	Nov 26, 1892	Ariel A.C., Philadelphia, Pennsylvania, U.S.	
27	Win	21–4 (2)	Denny Kelliher	PTS	2	Nov 24, 1892	Philadelphia, Pennsylvania, U.S.	
26	Win	20–4 (2)	Charles C. Smith	KO	4 (?)	Nov 21, 1892	Philadelphia, Pennsylvania, U.S.	
25	Win	19–4 (2)	George Godfrey	KO	15 (?)	Oct 31, 1892	Coney Island A.C., Coney Island, New York, U.S.	
24	Win	18–4 (2)	Jack Hart	PTS	3	May 29, 1892	London, England, U.K.	
23	Win	17–4 (2)	William Patmore	KO	1 (?)	May 27, 1892	London, England, U.K.	
22	Win	16–4 (2)	Mike Horrigan	KO	1 (?)	May 24, 1892	London, England, U.K.	
21	Win	15–4 (2)	Denver Ed Smith	PTS	4	Apr 30, 1892	Ariel A.C., Philadelphia, Pennsylvania, U.S.	
20	Win	14–4 (2)	Philadelphia Tommy Ryan	KO	2 (?)	Apr 22, 1892	Niblo's Theatre, Manhattan, New York City, New York, U.S.	Not to be confused with Tommy Ryan
19	Win	13–4 (2)	Charles Bull McCarthy	KO	2 (?)	Apr 21, 1892	Clermont Rink, Manhattan, New York City, New York, U.S.	
18	Win	12–4 (2)	Jerry Slattery	KO	2 (?)	Apr 19, 1892	Niblo's Theatre, Manhattan, New York City, New York, U.S.	
17	Win	11–4 (2)	Joe Godfrey	KO	1 (?)	Apr 9, 1892	Philadelphia, Pennsylvania, U.S.	
16	Loss	10–4 (2)	Jim Hall	NWS	4	Apr 2, 1892	Chicago, Illinois, U.S.	
15	Win	10–3 (2)	Billy Woods	KO	34 (?)	Dec 17, 1891	Pacific A.C., San Francisco, California, U.S.	
14	Loss	9–3 (2)	Joe Goddard	KO	4 (20)	Jul 20, 1891	Melbourne Athletic Club, Melbourne, Victoria, Australia	For Australian heavyweight title
13	Win	9–2 (2)	Owen Sullivan	KO	2 (8)	Jun 20, 1891	Melbourne Athletic Club, Melbourne, Victoria, Australia	
12	Win	8–2 (2)	Mick Dooley	KO	2	May 25, 1891	Melbourne Athletic Club, Melbourne, Victoria, Australia	A finish fight
11	Loss	7–2 (2)	Joe Goddard	RTD	4 (20)	Feb 10, 1891	Sydney Amateur Gymnastic Club, Sydney, New South Wales, Australia	For Australian heavyweight title
10	Win	7–1 (2)	Jim Fogarty	RTD	10	Nov 24, 1890	Australian AC, Darlinghurst, New South Wales, Australia	A finish fight
9	Win	6–1 (2)	Jack Davies	KO	9 (?)	May 26, 1890	Occidental A.C., San Francisco, California, U.S.	
8	Win	5–1 (2)	Billy Wilson	KO	2 (?)	Mar 26, 1890	Golden Gate A.C., San Francisco, California, U.S.	
7	Win	4–1 (2)	Frank McLarney	KO	2 (?)	Jan 25, 1890	Portland, Oregon, U.S.	
6	ND	3–1 (2)	Billy McCarthy	ND	4	Aug 27, 1889	California A.C., San Francisco, California, U.S.	
5	Loss	3–1 (1)	James J. Corbett	KO	27 (?)	Jun 5, 1889	Benicia Harbor, California, U.S.	
4	NC	3–0 (1)	James J. Corbett	NC	4 (?)	May 30, 1889	San Francisco, California, U.S.	Bout stopped by the police
3	Win	3–0	Frank Glover	KO	14	Feb 26, 1889	San Francisco, California, U.S.	A finish fight
2	Win	2–0	H McDonald	PTS	3	Dec 26, 1888	San Francisco, California, U.S.	
1	Win	1–0	George Bush	KO	2 (?)	Nov 14, 1888	San Francisco, California, U.S.	

== See also ==
- List of bare-knuckle boxers
- List of select Jewish boxers

== Books ==
- The Choynski Chronicles: A Biography of Hall of Fame Boxer Jewish Joe Choynski, by Christopher J Laforce. Win by Ko Publications (2013) ISBN 978-0979982286

Titles in pretence
New title	World Light Heavyweight Champion; August 29, 1899	Vacant Title next held by Len Harvey
