= Jim Jefferies (disambiguation) =

Jim Jefferies (born 1977) is an Australian comedian.

Jim or James Jefferies may also refer to:

- The Jim Jefferies Show, a 2017–2019 TV show hosted by the comedian
- Jim Jefferies (footballer) (born 1950), Scottish football player and manager

== See also ==
- Jim Jeffries (baseball) (1893–1938), American baseball player
- James Jeffries (disambiguation)
