= Geoffrey James =

Geoffrey James may refer to:

- Geoffrey James (photographer) (born 1942), Canadian photographer
- Geoffrey James (journalist) (born 1953), American author of The Tao of Programming

== See also ==
- Jeffrey James (disambiguation)
