= George Godfrey (boxer, born 1853) =

Canadian boxer

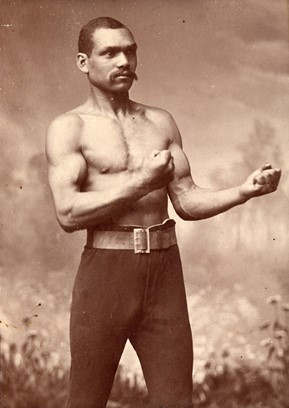

Personal information
- Nickname: "Old Chocolate"
- Nationality: Canadian
- Born: George Godfrey; 13 February 1852 The Bog, Charlottetown, Prince Edward Island
- Died: 17 October 1901 (aged 49) Revere, Massachusetts, US
- Height: 5 ft 10 in (178 cm)
- Weight: Heavyweight

Boxing career

Boxing record
- Total fights: 46
- Wins: 23
- Win by KO: 18
- Losses: 6
- Draws: 14
- No contests: 3

George Godfrey (20 March 1852 – 18 August 1901), nicknamed Old Chocolate by the press of the day in the last stage of his long career, was a Black Canadian heavyweight boxer who held the distinction of being World 'Colored' Heavyweight Champion during his career. Godfrey was inducted into the PEI Sports Hall of Fame in 1990.

== Biography ==
=== Early life ===
Godfrey was born to William Godfrey and Sarah Byers in an area of Charlottetown known as the Bog, a poor part of the west end. He first received boxing lessons while still residing in Charlottetown, from Professor Dick Cronin, who ran a boxing academy on Richmond Street in the city. Godfrey also played baseball locally. Godfrey left P.E.I. in 1870 to Boston where he worked as a porter for a firm of silk importers, trained at a gym, and took boxing lessons from a Professor Bailey. After winning in the heavyweight class at a local boxing competition in 1879, he began boxing professionally. At a fighting weight of 175 pounds on a 5 ft 10 in (178 cm) frame, he would be considered a light-heavyweight by modern standards. However, despite being undersized and rather old at 27 years of age to begin prizefighting, Godfrey would go on to achieve tremendous success inside the boxing ring.

=== Professional career ===
Godfrey went 4-0-4 in his first eight fights, which included a draw with famed pugilist Jake Kilrain. In just his ninth pro bout, he won the World 'Colored' Heavyweight Champion by beating Charles Hadley via sixth-round knockout on 23 February 1883. On 24 August 1888, at age 36, Godfrey faced off against world renowned Australian boxer Peter Jackson in San Francisco, California. He would end up losing the bout by technical knockout in the nineteenth round, subsequently losing the World 'Colored' Title. Godfrey had two more bouts with the much heavier Kilrain after their initial draw, losing both of them via knockout. He also faced Ireland's Peter Maher and California Joe Choynski towards the latter part of his career, almost 40 years old, also losing those matchups. It was during the last stages of his career, as the years took their toll and his ring skills visibly faded, that the unenlightened press of the day took to calling him by the deprecatory sobriquet of "Old Chocolate".

Godfrey spent nearly his entire career chasing eventual World Heavyweight Champion John L. Sullivan, who repeatedly refused to fight black contenders. However, in 1881 a story surfaced that a bare-knuckle fight against Sullivan had been scheduled but was stopped by the Boston police due to boxing being illegal in the state. This enhanced Godfrey's notoriety and earned him some high-profile matchups with some of the top pugilists of his time period, including the likes of Kilrain, Maher, Jackson and Choynski.

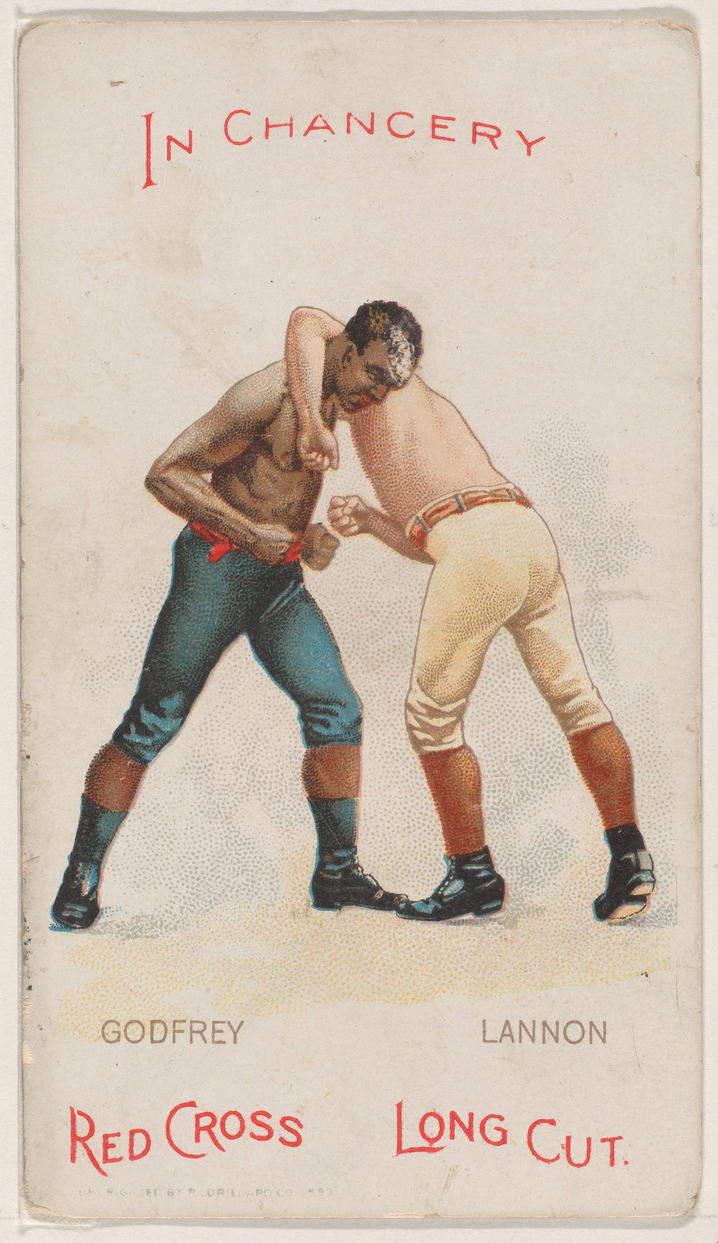
Depiction of Godfrey vs. Joe Lannon in Lorillard Company promotion

Among the notable fighters that Godfrey beat were Charles Hadley, C. C. Smith, England's "Denver Ed" Smith, McHenry Johnson ("Minneapolis Star"), Irish Joe Lannon, Canada's Patsy Cardiff, Steve O'Donnell of Australia and Joe Doherty.

=== Death ===
Godfrey died of Tuberculosis on 18 August 1901, at his house in Revere, Massachusetts. He had reportedly accumulated considerable real estate in both the Chelsea and Revere areas at the time of his death.

American boxer Feab S. Williams would later use the ring name "George Godfrey" and claimed the same Championship 42 years after his Canadian namesake.

== Notable bouts ==
Result	Opponent	Type	Rd., Time	Date	Location	Notes
Draw	(United States) Nick Burley	PTS	15	1896-03-05	(United States) Music Hall, Boston, Massachusetts	
Loss	(Republic of Ireland) Peter Maher	KO	6	1894-05-28	(United States) Boston Casino, Boston, Massachusetts	
Draw	(United States) Joe Butler	PTS	4	1893-12-15	(United States) Boston, Massachusetts	
NC	(Australia) Jim Hall	NC	3	1893-11-11	(United States) Music Hall, Boston, Massachusetts	
Loss	(United States) Joe Choynski	KO	15	1892-10-31	(United States) Coney Island A.C., Coney Island, New York	
Win	(United States) C.C. Smith	KO	4	1892-08-15	(United States) New York, New York	
Loss	(United States) Jake Kilrain	KO	44	1891-03-13	(United States) California A.C., San Francisco, California	
Loss	(Australia) Peter Jackson	TKO	19	1888-08-24	(United States) California A.C., San Francisco, California	Lost World "Colored" Heavyweight Title.
Draw	(United States) C.C. Smith	PTS	6	1885-01-15	(United States) Boston, Massachusetts	
Loss	(United States) Jake Kilrain	TKO	3	1883-05-16	(United States) Boston, Massachusetts	
Win	(United States) Charles Hadley	KO	6 (6)	1883-02-23	(United States) Cribb Hall, Boston, Massachusetts	Won World "Colored" Heavyweight Title.
Draw	(United States) Charles Hadley	PTS	6	1883-01-18	(United States) New York, New York	
Draw	(United States) Charles Hadley	PTS	4	1882-01-26	(United States) Harry Hill's, New York, New York	
Draw	(United States) Jake Kilrain	PTS	3	1882-01-15	(United States) Boston, Massachusetts	
Draw	(United States) Charles Hadley	PTS	6	1879-01-01	(United States) New York, New York	

== See also ==
- List of bare-knuckle boxers

Awards and achievements
Preceded by Charles Hadley	World Colored Heavyweight Champion; 23 February 1883 - 24 August 1888	Succeeded by Peter Jackson
