= James Jeffrey =

James Jeffrey may refer to:

- James Franklin Jeffrey (born 1946), American diplomat
- James S. Jeffrey (1904-1989), Scottish surgeon

== See also ==
- James Jeffries (disambiguation)
- Jeffrey James (disambiguation)
