= Jeff James =

Jeff James or Jeffrey James may refer to:

- Jeff James (baseball) (1941–2006), American baseball player
- Jeff James (musician) (born 1988), American singer and record producer
- Jeff James (public servant) (born 1968), British public servant and executive
- Jeffrey James (diplomat), British diplomat
- Jeffrey James, Australian television presenter

== See also ==
- Geoffrey James (disambiguation)
- James Jeffrey (disambiguation)
