= Harry Woodson =

American boxer

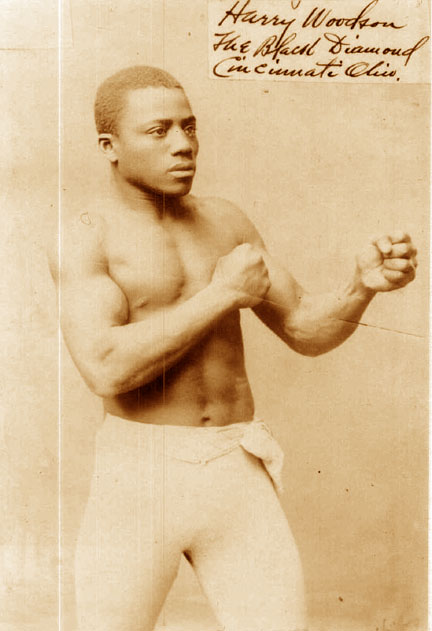
Harry Woodson in 1885

Harry Woodson (c. 1852 – October 15, 1887) was a professional boxer, nicknamed The Black Diamond, who was active during the 19th century in the Cincinnati area. Due to the political reality of the time Woodson mostly fought other black boxers, but he was good enough that he fought occasional matches with white men as well.

Having earned enough money Woodson would begin to operate his own gymnasium, but he was shot to death in an argument. The source of the conflict was a rivalry over a woman.

== See also ==
- List of bare-knuckle boxers
