= James J. Jeffries =

American boxer (1875–1953)

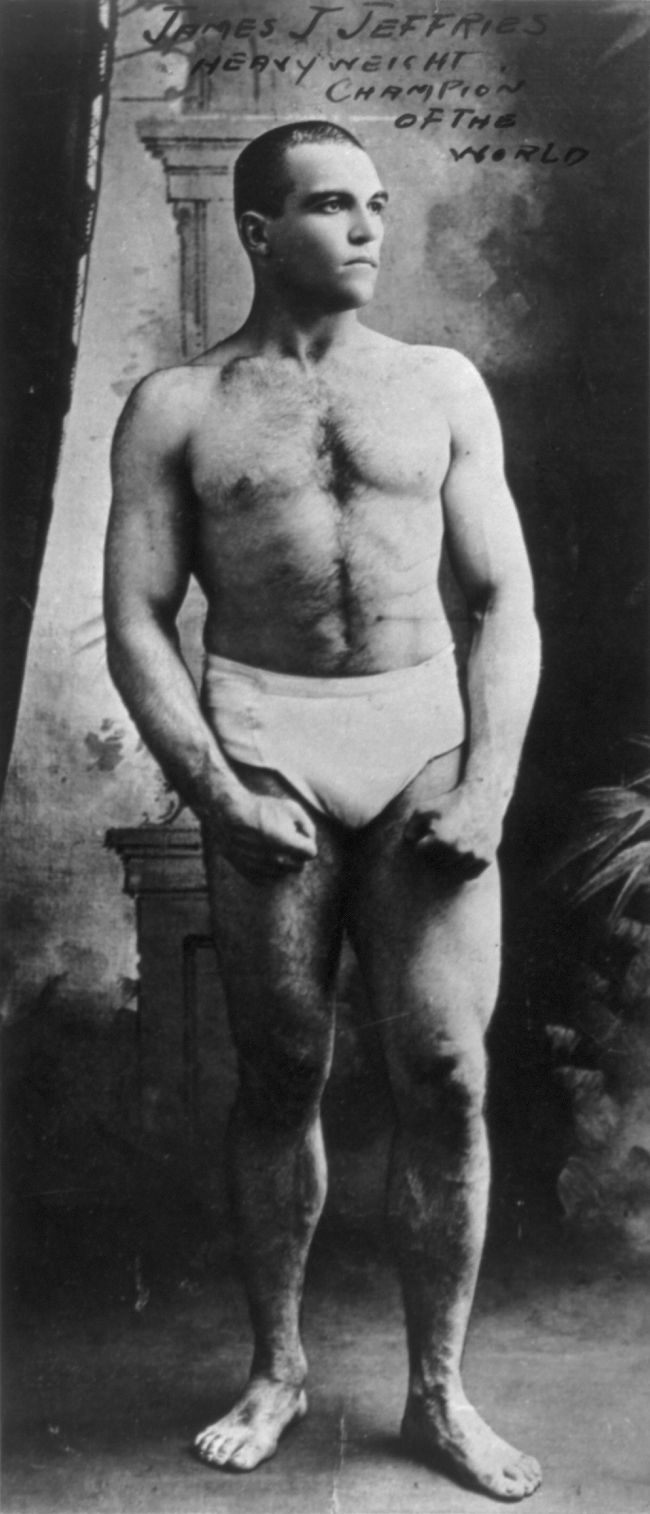

Personal information
- Nicknames: The Boilermaker; Big Jeff; Big Jim; Jim; The Great White Hope
- Born: James Jackson Jeffries; April 15, 1875 Carroll, Ohio, U.S.
- Died: March 3, 1953 (aged 77) Burbank, California, U.S.
- Height: 6 ft 1 1/2 in (187 cm)
- Weight: Heavyweight

Boxing career
- Reach: 76 1/2 in (194 cm)
- Stance: Orthodox

Boxing record
- Total fights: 24
- Wins: 19
- Win by KO: 16
- Losses: 1
- Draws: 2
- No contests: 2

James Jackson Jeffries (April 15, 1875 – March 3, 1953) was an American professional boxer and world heavyweight champion from 1899 until his initial retirement in 1905.

He was known for his enormous strength and stamina. Jeffries fought out of a crouch with his left arm extended forward. He was able to absorb tremendous punishment while wearing his opponents down. It is believed this crouching crab technique was taught to him by his trainer, former welterweight and middleweight Champion Tommy Ryan. Although, Jeffries disputes this saying he developed his crouching style instinctively after taking a left hook to the liver by John Brink.

Jeffries stood 6 ft 1.5 in (1.87 m) tall and weighed 225 pounds (102 kg) in his prime. He could run 100 yards (91 m) in just under eleven seconds, and could high jump almost 6 feet (180 cm). A natural left-hander, he possessed one-punch knockout power in his left hook, and brawled his way to the top of the rankings.

Writer Jack London coined the phrase "Great White Hope" to describe Jeffries in his attempt to win the heavyweight crown from African-American world champion Jack Johnson in 1910. Jeffries came out of retirement for the fight, urged on by London and many others who wished to see a white man once again reign as heavyweight champion. Jeffries was beaten by Johnson in what was the first prizefight to be billed as the "Fight of the Century".

== Early life ==
Jeffries moved with his family from their Ohio farm to Los Angeles, California, at age seven. At the age of 15, Jeffries worked for a while as a boilermaker, later working in copper mines in Temecula, California, alongside grown men at only the age of 17. There, Jeffries had his first true fight, having occurred when he refused to submit to the traditional hazing for newcomers. Instead of running the gauntlet, he challenged the largest miner to a wrestling match that quickly escalated into a long, no-holds-barred fistfight. The fight reportedly lasted almost an hour until Jeffries won. He then went into boxing. In later life, "The Boilermaker" was one of his professional nicknames.

== Career ==
Jeffries was both powerfully built and athletic as a teenager. Despite being inexperienced, Jeffries was a training partner for James J. Corbett in his fight with Bob Fitzsimmons. He was introduced to Corbett by a handler named Charley White who then described Jeffries as being "as strong as a horse". Jeffries boxed as an amateur until age 20, when he started fighting professionally.

Boxing historian John Durant described Jeffries as such:

One of the strongest men who ever entered the ring, Jeff at 21 stood 6 feet, 2 inches, weighed 220 pounds, and was huge all over. He had pillar-like legs, an enormous shaggy chest, and the muscles of a weight lifter. For a giant he was surprisingly fast and agile. He could run 100 yards in 11 seconds, and high jump 5 feet, 10 inches.

In his third fight, Jeffries knocked out the highly regarded boxer Hank Griffin in the fourteenth round. Jack Johnson would subsequently fight Griffin on three occasions.

Jeffries fought the top heavyweight contender, Gus Ruhlin, to a draw. Ruhlin was knocked down with a brutal punch at the end of the final round and was saved by the bell from being counted out. The decision was met with unfavorable reactions from the audience, many of whom felt Jeffries won.

On his way to the title in 1898, Jeffries knocked out Peter Jackson, the great boxer whom John L. Sullivan had refused to fight, in three rounds. This had been only the second defeat in Jackson's entire career; his first loss was from a four-round fight over thirteen years earlier around the beginning of his career. Jackson retired shortly afterward.

Jeffries defeated the formidable "Mexican Pete" Everett by knockout in only the third round on April 22, 1898. His next fight was against the Irishman Tom Sharkey. The fight went the full twenty rounds and Sharkey was knocked down in the eleventh round. Jeffries won the decision.

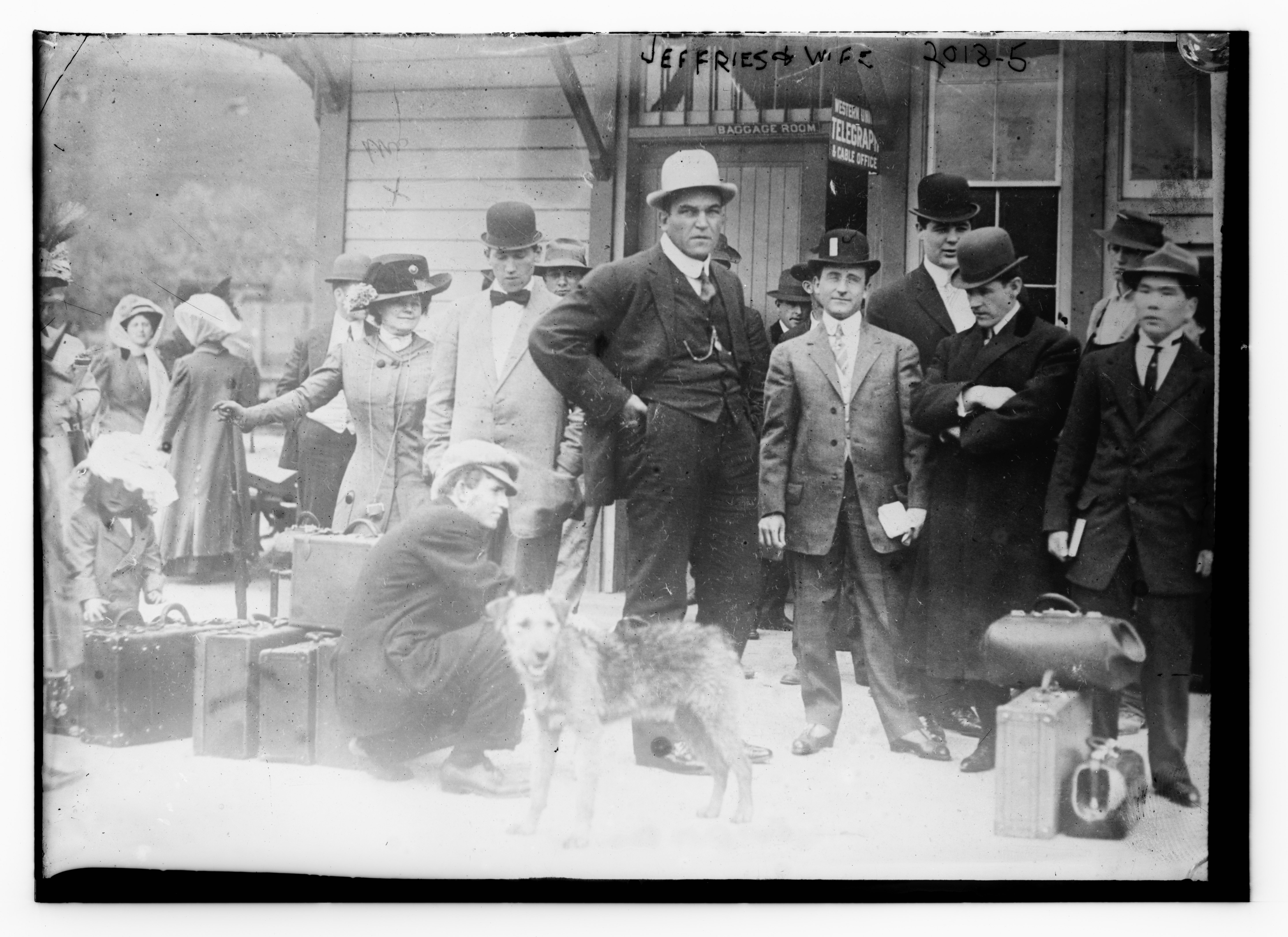
James Jeffries (middle) 1900

After defeating the big, fast-moving, sharp-jabbing Bob Armstrong, Jeffries had earned the right to challenge for the World Heavyweight Championship.

=== World Heavyweight Champion ===
On June 9, 1899, in Brooklyn, New York, he defeated Bob Fitzsimmons by KO in the eleventh round to win the Heavyweight Championship of the World. That August, he embarked on a tour of Europe, putting on exhibition fights for the fans. Jeffries was involved in several motion pictures recreating portions of his championship fights. Filmed portions of his other bouts and of some of his exhibition matches survive to this day.

In his first title defense, he won a twenty-five-round decision in a rematch over Tom Sharkey.

Jeffries set the record for the quickest KO in a Heavyweight title fight ever, which was 55 seconds against Jack Finnegan in his second title defense.

His next defense was against the former Heavyweight Champion and legendary technician, James J. Corbett. Corbett had put up a perfect defense and could have arguably won had the fight gone the distance. However, Corbett was knocked out cold from a left to the jaw in the 23rd round of the scheduled 25-round fight.

Jeffries later got the chance to avenge his controversial draw with Gus Ruhlin when he defended his title against him on November 15, 1901. Claims that Ruhlin quit during the fifth round are incorrect. All of the local next-day San Francisco sources agree that Ruhlin's manager, Billy Madden, threw in the towel to retire Ruhlin during the one-minute interval between the fifth and sixth rounds.

An example of Jeffries's ability to absorb punishment and recover from a severe battering to win a bout came in his rematch for the title with Fitzsimmons, who is regarded as one of the hardest punchers in boxing history. The rematch with Jeffries occurred on July 25, 1902, in San Francisco. To train for the bout Jeffries's daily training included a 14-mile (23 km) run, 2 hours of skipping rope, medicine ball training, 20 minutes sparring on the heavy bag, and at least 12 rounds of sparring in the ring. He also trained in wrestling.

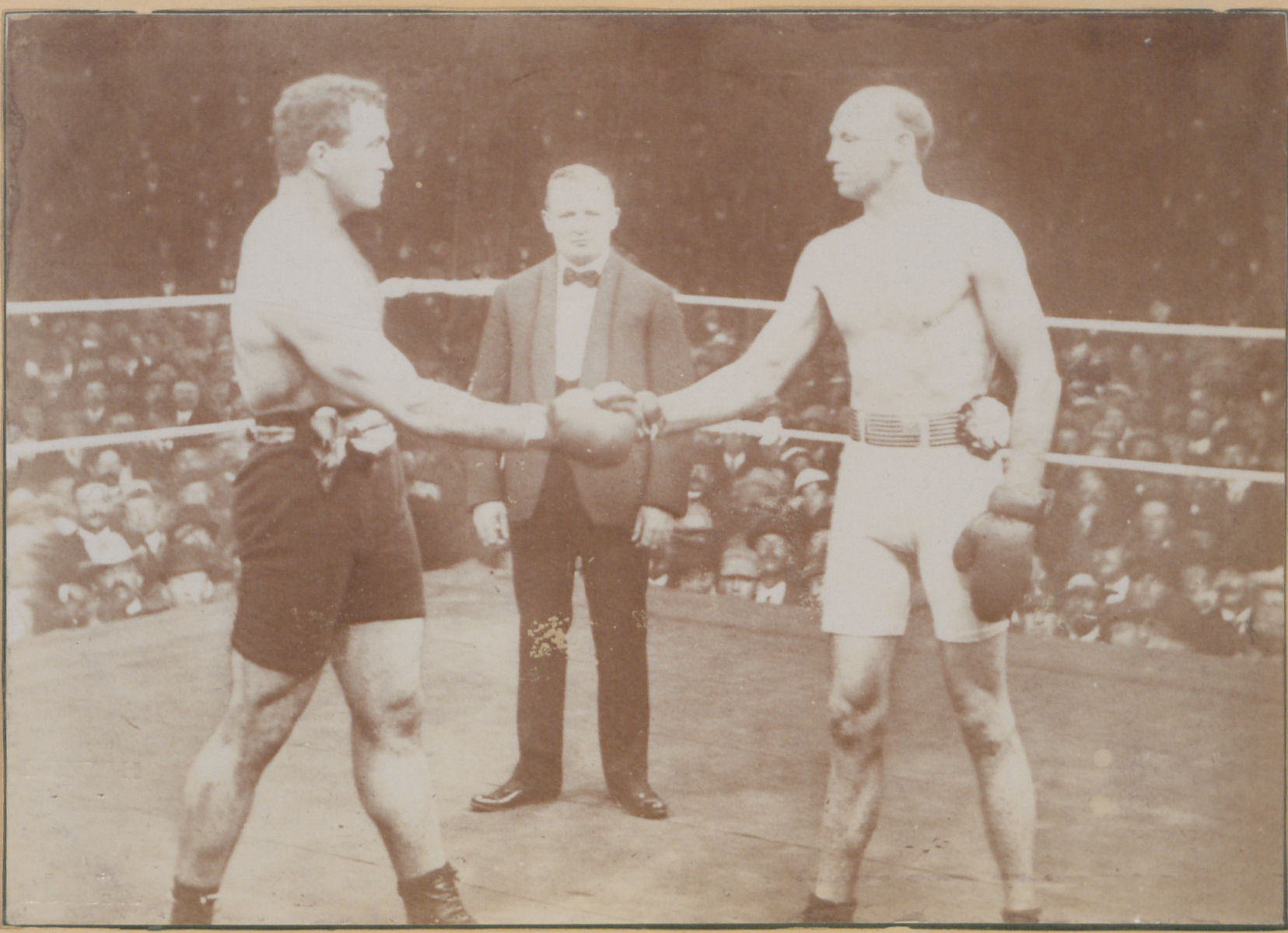
Jeffries (left) vs Fitzsimmons (right)

For nearly eight rounds Fitzsimmons subjected Jeffries to a vicious battering. Jeffries suffered a broken nose, both his cheeks were cut to the bone, and gashes were opened over both eyes. It appeared that the fight would have to be stopped, as blood freely flowed into Jeffries's eyes. Then in the eighth round, Jeffries lashed out with a terrific right to the stomach, followed by a left hook to the jaw which knocked Fitzsimmons unconscious.

Jeffries and Corbett met one last time in the ring on August 14, 1903. This time Jeffries was in total control for all ten rounds of the scheduled 20-round bout. Tommy Ryan, Corbett's chief second, threw a large palm-leaf fan into the ring to alert Referee Graney that he should stop the fight.

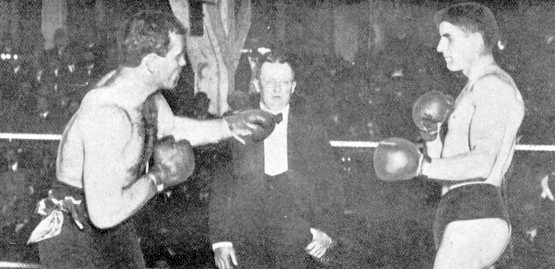
Jeffries (left) vs Corbett (right)

Jeffries had his seventh and final title defense against Canadian Jack Munroe, whom he stopped in only two rounds.

Jeffries broke the ribs of three opponents in title fights: Jim Corbett, Gus Ruhlin, and Tom Sharkey. Jeffries retired undefeated in May 1905. He served as a referee for the next few years, including the bout in which Marvin Hart defeated Jack Root to stake a claim at Jeffries's vacated title. Jeffries had never been knocked down in his prime.

Jeffries had likely fought many more bouts than 22 at this time. Many of his fights were lost in history. Jeffries, however, had never been defeated before his original retirement.

Durant describes Jeffries as dominating a golden age of boxing that included boxers like Corbett, Fitzsimmons, Sharkey, Jackson and others, while in his prime:

These brilliant fighters, true masters of the ring, all coming at the same time and all battling each other with regularity, created the Golden Age. And at the top stood Jeffries, the invincible one, the man who had twice defeated the ring’s top men and had never been defeated himself. He had never even been knocked off his feet. He terrorized the heavyweight field to such an extent that by 1904 there was no one left to fight.

=== Comeback: "The Fight of the Century" ===
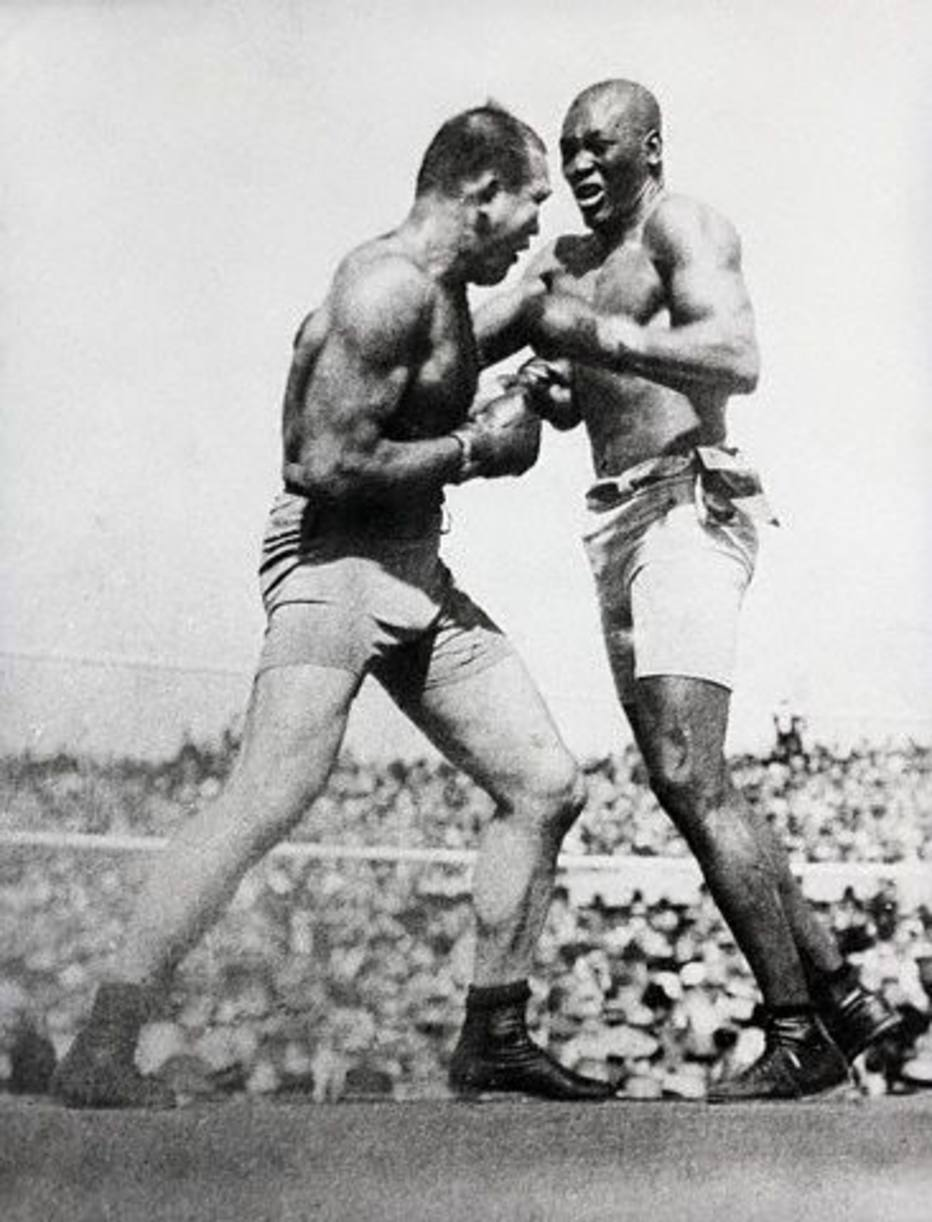
James Jeffries during his fight with Jack Johnson

Over five years after retiring, Jeffries made a comeback on July 4, 1910, at Reno, Nevada, in a match against champion Jack Johnson, who had won the Heavyweight Championship in 1908 by defeating Canadian champion Tommy Burns at Rushcutters Bay in Australia. Burns was the first heavyweight champion to fight black challengers.

The media put pressure onto Jeffries and promoters dangled wealth in front of him to take the fight. The bid guaranteed a purse of $101,000 (equivalent to $3,619,000 in 2025) to be divided 75 percent to the winner and 25 percent to the loser, as well as two-thirds of the revenues collected from the sales of the right to film the fight (each boxer received one third of the equity rights). In addition, promoter Tex Rickard had signed Jeffries to a $75,000 personal contract.

After a six-year lay-off, the 35-year-old Jeffries was out of shape and had lost much of his muscle. Jeffries weighed over 330 pounds (150 kg), while Johnson was in fighting condition. The ex-champion had to lose about 110 pounds to get down to his fighting weight of 226. Previous Heavyweight Champion John L. Sullivan (an ethnic Irish American who refused to fight African-American contenders) remarked during an interview with The New York Times that Jeffries's personal doctor was so amazed at Johnson's physical condition that he felt Jeffries could win only if Johnson had a lack of skill on the day. As the media instigated racist remarks about winning the title for whites, Jeffries's final words before the fight were, "It is my intention to go right after my opponent and knock him out as soon as possible." His wife also commented, "I'm not interested in prizefighting but I am interested in my husband's welfare; I do hope this will be his last fight."

Ringside seats that had been priced at $50 were being scalped at $125 each (equivalent to approximately $4,320 in 2025 dollars). More than 1,000 spectators who were unable to get seats in the sold-out arena climbed over the walls to enter.

Before the fight, which was scheduled for 45 three-minute rounds, famous boxers who had traveled to Reno to witness the contest were introduced to the crowd, including Sam Langford, a black boxer who was unable to secure a title fight, even from Jack Johnson. The greatest applause went to Jake Kilrain, who had battled John L. Sullivan back in the bare-knuckle days.

At three minutes to 1 PM, Johnson entered the ring; his contract provided that he would always be first to enter the ring, to satisfy a superstition of his. The thermometer read 110 °F (43 °C), which meant the match would be even more brutal due to heat. Jeffries soon joined Johnson in the ring. Rickard served as referee. Johnson and Jeffries could not agree on a referee, and Rickard's publicity-minded offers to President William Howard Taft and writer Arthur Conan Doyle to serve as referee had been declined. Rickard took the position although he had never refereed a prize fight before.

In the first three rounds, the boxers sparred to feel each other out. Johnson, having read that no one could tie Jeffries up on the inside due to his power, told the press that not only would he do so, but that he planned to neutralize Jeffries's power by twisting his arms behind him. Toward the end of the fourth round, he did just that, pinning Jeffries's arms in back of him for a moment, but Jeffries broke the clinch. Johnson landed a solid overhand right to Jeffries's head just before the bell.

Johnson began dominating the fight in rounds five through twelve, as his opponent faded in the heat and from Johnson's onslaught. The heat began to get to Johnson, too, by round 13, but he was still the stronger and younger man in the ring. Toward the end of that round, he delivered a right and a right uppercut to Jeffries's head that took their toll. In the next round, Jeffries eluded Johnson, who stalked him all over the ring.

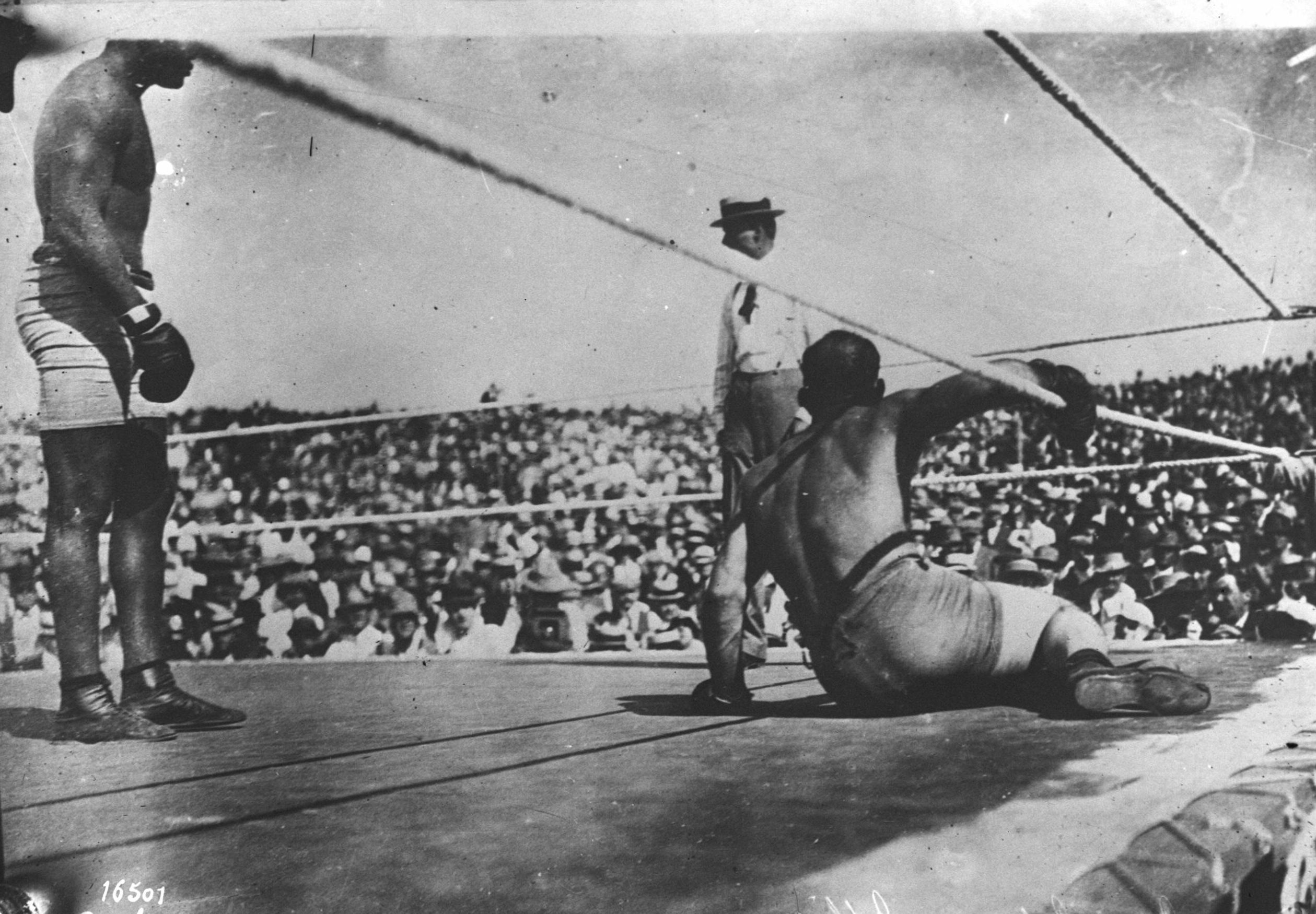
Jeffries knock down vs Johnson (1910)

In round 15, Johnson went after Jeffries and caught him against the ropes with a right upper-cut, followed by three left uppercuts that sent the ex-champ to the canvas for the first time in his career. He could no longer put up a defense and, as Jeffries got up, Johnson hit him with a left hook that sent him to the canvas and through the ropes, putting his torso outside the ring. Helped to his feet by one of his seconds and a fan, as soon as Jeffries was back in the ring he was rushed by Johnson, who knocked him down again with a right to the head. As Rickard moved in to separate the fighters, Jeffries got up, but his manager had entered the ring to stop the fight and save his fighter from being knocked out. Johnson retained the title by a technical knockout.

Johnson later remarked that he knew the fight was over in the fourth round when he landed an uppercut to Jeffries's face and saw the look in his eyes. "I knew what that look meant," he said. "The old ship was sinking." John L. Sullivan commented for The New York Times after the fight that Johnson won deservedly, fairly, and convincingly:

The fight of the century is over and a black man is the undisputed champion of the world. It was a poor fight as fights go, this less than 15-round affair between James J. Jeffries and Jack Johnson. Scarcely has there ever been a championship contest that was so one-sided. All of Jeffries much-vaunted condition amounted to nothing. He wasn't in it from the first bell tap to the last .... The negro had few friends, but there was little demonstration against him. (Spectators) could not help but admire Johnson because he is the type of prizefighter that is admired by sportsmen. He played fairly at all times and fought fairly. ... What a crafty, powerful, cunning left hand (Johnson) has. He is one of the craftiest, cunningest boxers that ever stepped into the ring. ... They both fought closely all during the 15 rounds. It was just the sort of fight that Jeffries wanted. There was no running or ducking like Corbett did with me in New Orleans (1892). Jeffries did not miss so many blows, because he hardly started any. Johnson was on top of him all the time.... (Johnson) didn't get gay at all with Jeffries in the beginning, and it was always the white man who clinched, but Johnson was very careful, and he backed away and took no chances, and was good-natured with it all. ... The best man won, and I was one of the first to congratulate him, and also one of the first to extend my heartfelt sympathy to the beaten man.

== Later life ==
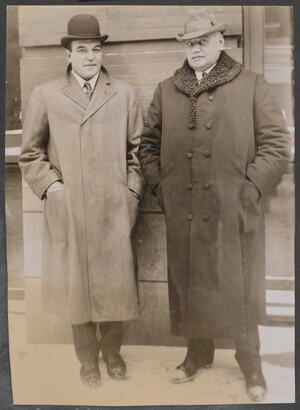
Jeffries (left) standing with fight promoter Otto Floto (right), 1909

In his later years, Jeffries trained boxers and worked as a fight promoter. He promoted many fights out of a structure known as "Jeffries Barn", which was located on his alfalfa ranch at the southwest corner of Victory Boulevard and Buena Vista Street, in Burbank, California. (His ranch house was on the southeast corner until the early 1960s.)

== Death ==
Seven years after suffering a stroke, Jeffries died on March 3, 1953, in bed at his Burbank home, in the presence of his niece Lillian Bull. She had been living with Jeffries as his housekeeper, and he had instructed her to call a doctor. Jeffries died before the doctor arrived. The doctor, William M. Nethery, attributed his death to a heart attack caused by coronary thrombosis. His body was interred at Inglewood Park Cemetery in Inglewood, California.

== Legacy ==
Today, the legacy of Jeffries is widely forgotten. However, he was once considered one of the greatest Heavyweight Champions of all time by many fellow boxers and boxing experts:

- Jack Root, Willie Ritchie and Tommy Burns, former Light Heavyweight, Lightweight and Heavyweight Champions, respectively, rated Jeffries as the greatest heavyweight.
- James J. Corbett said of Jeffries, "The thing that always impressed me was the speed the youngster had, and he weighed two-hundred-twenty-five pounds. I hold that Jeffries was the greatest Heavyweight Champion of them all."
- Sam Langford, the great fighter who fought from lightweight to heavyweight, advertised to fight any man in the world, except Jim Jeffries.
- Tom Sharkey, heavyweight top contender, thought that Jeffries would have beaten Jack Dempsey and Joe Louis on the same night. He said Jeffries was strong like a bull and quick on his feet like a cat. Sharkey called Jeffries the greatest fighter of all time.
- Jack Johnson, the only man to beat Jeffries, stated in an interview with Ring Magazine that he thought Jeffries was the greatest. In another interview, Johnson said Jeffries would beat both Jack Dempsey and Joe Louis.
- Jack Dempsey, the great Heavyweight Champion, once said: "Jim Jeffries was a tough gun. If we could have gotten in the ring together, each at our best... I probably would have had my chin knocked off."
- William Brady, who managed both Jim Jeffries and Jim Corbett, remarked about Jeffries: "There was never a man better fitted anatomically, physically, and temperamentally for the role of World's Heavyweight Champion."
- Nat Fleischer, founder of Ring Magazine and The Ring Record book, described Jeffries: "One of the most formidable fighting machines the prize ring ever produced."
- Dan Morgan, fight manager for forty years, who saw them all, rated Jeffries as the all-time best. Morgan called Jeffries a "Champion of Champions".
- Tex Rickard, famed sportsman and promoter, held the view: "Big Jim will always live in my memory as the greatest heavyweight boxer of his time. While he reigned supreme, he gave all a chance. He did not know the meaning of the word fear."
- W. W. Naughton, sportswriter of the day, records: "To sum up his qualities of ringsmanship, it may be said he is fairly talented in every branch of self-defense. He boxes cleverly, defends himself well, and strikes a hard blow. But back of all these are the qualities which have made him a champion, magnificent strength and wonderful endurance."
- Dewitt Van Court, boxing instructor and athletic director of the Los Angeles Athletic Club wrote: "I was with James J. Jeffries when he first started to box. I was with him when he won the Championship. I was with him when he lost it. Besides being the greatest Heavyweight Champion that ever lived, he is today and has been all his life, a man among men, a true friend with a heart as big as his body."

The city of Burbank embedded a small bronze plaque in the sidewalk at the site where James Jeffries died. The plaque was located on the east side of Buena Vista Street ~150 yards south of Victory Boulevard, before being stored at Burbank City Hall, and now is located at the Gordon R. Howard Museum.

Jeffries Avenue, which runs parallel to and is south of Victory Boulevard in Burbank, is named after him.

James J. Jeffries was elected to the International Boxing Hall of Fame in 1990. Jeffries is credited with fighting nine International Boxing Hall of Fame boxers and successfully having seven title defenses in his short career. He is described as embodying the "rugged two-fisted hulk of brawn that people at the turn of the century wanted their champion to be".

== Professional boxing record ==
24 fights	19 wins	1 loss
By knockout	16	1
By decision	3	0
By disqualification	0	0
Draws	2	
No contests	2	

No.	Result	Record	Opponent	Type	Round, time	Date	Location	Notes
24	Loss	19–1–2 (2)	Jack Johnson	TKO	15 (45), 2:20	4 July 1910	Reno, Nevada, U.S.	For world heavyweight title
23	Win	19–0–2 (2)	Jack Munroe	TKO	2 (20), 0:45	26 Aug 1904	Mechanic's Pavilion, San Francisco, California, U.S.	Retained world heavyweight title
22	Win	18–0–2 (2)	James J. Corbett	TKO	10 (20)	14 Aug 1903	Mechanic's Pavilion, San Francisco, California, U.S.	Retained world heavyweight title
21	Win	17–0–2 (2)	Bob Fitzsimmons	KO	8 (20)	25 Jul 1902	San Francisco Athletic Club, San Francisco, California, U.S.	Retained world heavyweight title
20	Win	16–0–2 (2)	Gus Ruhlin	RTD	6 (20)	15 Nov 1901	Mechanic's Pavilion, San Francisco, California, U.S.	Retained world heavyweight title
19	Win	15–0–2 (2)	Joe Kennedy	KO	2 (4), 2:00	24 Sep 1901	Reliance Athletic Club, Oakland, California, U.S.	
18	NC	14–0–2 (2)	Hank Griffin	NC	4	17 Sep 1901	Hazard's Pavilion, Los Angeles, California, U.S.	
17	Win	14–0–2 (1)	James J. Corbett	KO	23 (25), 2:11	11 May 1900	Seaside Athletic Club, Coney Island, New York, U.S.	Retained world heavyweight title
16	Win	13–0–2 (1)	John Finnegan	KO	1 (10), 0:55	6 Apr 1900	Cadillac Athletic Club, Detroit, Michigan, U.S.	Retained world heavyweight title
15	Win	12–0–2 (1)	Tom Sharkey	PTS	25	3 Nov 1899	Coney Island Athletic Club, Brooklyn, New York, U.S.	Retained world heavyweight title
14	Win	11–0–2 (1)	Bob Fitzsimmons	KO	11 (20), 1:32	9 Jun 1899	Coney Island Athletic Club, Brooklyn, New York, U.S.	Retained world heavyweight title claim; Won world heavyweight title
13	Win	10–0–2 (1)	Bob Armstrong	PTS	10	5 Aug 1898	Lenox Athletic Club, New York City, New York, U.S.	Retained world heavyweight title claim
12	Win	9–0–2 (1)	Tom Sharkey	PTS	20	6 May 1898	Mechanic's Pavilion, San Francisco, California, U.S.	Won world heavyweight title claim
11	Win	8–0–2 (1)	Mexican Pete Everett	TKO	3 (20), 1:30	22 Apr 1898	Olympic Athletic Club, San Francisco, California, U.S.	
10	Win	7–0–2 (1)	Peter Jackson	TKO	3 (20)	22 Mar 1898	Woodward's Pavilion, San Francisco, California, U.S.	
9	Win	6–0–2 (1)	Joe Goddard	TKO	4 (15)	28 Feb 1898	Hazard's Pavilion, Los Angeles, California, U.S.	
8	Draw	5–0–2 (1)	Joe Choynski	PTS	20	30 Nov 1897	National Athletic Club, San Francisco, California, U.S.	
7	NC	5–0–1 (1)	Dan Long	NC	6	25 Aug 1897	Hazard's Pavilion, Los Angeles, California, U.S.	
6	Draw	5–0–1	Gus Ruhlin	PTS	20	16 Jul 1897	Mechanic's Pavilion, San Francisco, California, U.S.	
5	Win	5–0	Henry Baker	TKO	9 (20)	18 May 1897	Olympic Athletic Club, San Francisco, California, U.S.	
4	Win	4–0	Theodore Van Buskirk	KO	2 (15), 2:00	9 Apr 1897	National Athletic Club, San Francisco, California, U.S.	
3	Win	3–0	Hank Griffin	KO	14	1 Dec 1896	Oakland Tribune, San Francisco, California, U.S.	Exact date is uncertain
2	Win	2–0	Dan Long	TKO	2 (10)	2 Jul 1896	Occidental Athletic Club, San Francisco, California, U.S.	
1	Win	1–0	Hank Lorraine	KO	2 (4)	29 Oct 1895	Los Angeles Athletic Club, Los Angeles, California, U.S.	

== Selected filmography ==
- Kid Speed (1924)
- The Prince of Broadway (1926)
- One-Round Hogan (1927)
- Beau Broadway (1928)
- Rain or Shine (1930)
- The Fighting Gentleman (1932)
- The Midnight Patrol (1932)

== See also ==
- List of heavyweight boxing champions
- Vernon Arena

Awards and achievements
Preceded by Bob Fitzsimmons	World Heavyweight Champion; June 9, 1899–May 13, 1905; Vacated	Succeeded by Marvin Hart; Filled vacancy
Records
Preceded by James J. Corbett; 2	Most opponents beaten for the world heavyweight championship 6; 3rd opponent beaten on 6 April 1900; 26 August 1904–2 December 1907	Succeeded by Tommy Burns
Preceded by James J. Corbett; 2	Most wins in world heavyweight championship fights 8; 3rd win on 6 April 1900; 26 August 1904–17 March 1908	Succeeded by Tommy Burns
