= Nick Burley =

American boxer (1875–1911)

Personal information
- Nationality: American
- Born: Nicholas Barovich; May 17, 1875 Austin, Nevada
- Died: March 5, 1911 (aged 35)
- Weight: Heavyweight

Boxing career

Boxing record
- Total fights: 72
- Wins: 45
- Win by KO: 37
- Losses: 21
- Draws: 5
- No contests: 1

Nick Burley (May 17, 1875 – March 5, 1911) was an American boxer of Croatian descent (from Boljenovići, Pelješac peninsula) His boxing career from 1890 until 1907. In 1902 he defeated Frank "Paddy" Slavin to win the Heavyweight Championship of the Yukon Territory. The March 6, 1911 Tacoma, Washington Daily News reported that Burley died of a heart attack on Western Avenue, in Seattle, Washington.

== See also ==
- List of bare-knuckle boxers
