= List of Australian middleweight boxing champions =

The Australian middleweight boxing championship is a title administrated by the Australian National Boxing Federation. The current Australian middleweight champion is Issac Hardman.

== Recognition ==
In 1886 a boxing match between Jack Donohue and Alf Pickering at Foley's Gymnasium in Sydney was promoted as being for the middleweight champion of Australia, however the winner was not referred to as the middleweight champion after the fight and neither boxer was ever promoted as defending the title. Billy McCarthy was being referred to as middleweight champion of Australia as of 1886. However, his matches were not promoted as though it was an official title which was on the line.

In January 1889 a bout between Bob Fitzsimmons and Jim Hall at Foley's Gymnasium in Sydney was promoted as being for the middleweight championship, however again no champion was announced after the fight which was won by Fitzsimmons. In October 1889 another match involving Jim Hall, this time against Jim Fogarty, was promoted as a match for the middleweight championship again, and it was also referred to as a championship match after the result, although because it was a draw there was still no champion named.

Despite not winning a 'championship match' Jim Hall had adopted the title of champion middleweight of New South Wales as of 1890 due to a string of strong performances and contenders declining to fight him. In January 1890 Peter Boland, who claimed to be champion middleweight of Victoria, challenged him to a fight and they fought that month with Hall winning, which resulted in him being acknowledged as middleweight champion of Australia by the press. Hall's next match was also referred to as a match for the middleweight championship of Australia, and promotion described Jim Hall as the countries best middleweight, reflecting that it was a title defence. Promotion for a boxing match between Dan Creedon and Mick Dunn in 1892 described it as being for the middle-weight championship for Australia, due to Creedon being the best middle-weight in Victoria and Dunn being the best middle-weight in New South Wales, and argued that the title had never been clearly defined prior.

In 1924 the company Stadiums Limited attempted to assume responsibility for the title, organizing a match for the championship after Alf Stewart refused to box for six months, however the decision was not universally acknowledged and the media still regarded Stewart as reigning champion when he returned to the ring.

Recognition of the champion became contentious in the early 1940s when champion Hockey Bennell lost a welterweight championship fight to Vic Patrick. Leichhardt Stadium management argued that the title reverted to previous title-holder Tommy Colteaux, and he was generally accepted as champion in Sydney, however Stadiums Limited grew frustrated with Colteaux refusing to accept matches and decided to reject his claim and hold a tournament to determine their own champion putting forward Alan Westbury in January 1945. By February Westbury was generally regarded as the legitimate champion by fans, and when Hockey Bennell beat the Leichhardt 'champion' in March 1945 he was aiming to earn a fight against Westbury to become the middleweight champion, reflecting that Stadiums Limited had assumed responsibility for the title.

The title has been formally administered by the Australian National Boxing Federation (previously the Australian Boxing Federation) since 1965.

== List ==
^{r} – Champion relinquished title.
^{s} – Champion stripped of title.
Italics date – Reign disputed.

=== List of champions ===
No.	Champion	Nat.	Reign Began	Reign Ended	Title defenses	Notes	Source(s)
1	Jim Hall def. Peter Boland	(Australia)	18 January 1890	19 January 1891	def. Bob Fitzsimmons on 11 February 1890 def. Eddie Welsh on 11 April 1890 def. Edward Rollins on 13 December 1890	-	
2	Billy McCarthy def. Jim Hall	(England)	19 January 1891	May 1891^{r}	def. Jim Burge on 6 April 1891	Moved to America in May 1891	
3	Dan Creedon def. Edward Rollins	(New Zealand)	17 October 1891	November 1892^{r}	def. Jim Ryan on 3 November 1891 drw. Martin Costello on 5 March 1892 def. Jim Ryan on 11 October 1892 def. Mick Dunn on 15 November 1892	Moved to America in November 1892	
4	Tom Duggan def. Mick McInerney	(Australia)	7 April 1894	November 1895^{r}	def. Bill Doherty on 3 November 1894 drw. Mick McInerney on 15 April 1895	Moved to South Africa in November 1895	
5	Billy Edwards def. Bill Jennings	(Australia)	14 March 1896	March 1898^{r}	def. Bill Jennings on 23 May 1896 def. Bill Jennings on 11 July 1896	Moved to England in March 1898	
6	Bill Jennings def. Tim Murphy	(Australia)	4 September 1898	14 October 1899	-	Temporarily retired due to blood poisoning in December 1898	
7	Tim Murphy def. Bill Jennings	(New Zealand)	14 October 1899	March 1900^{r}	def. Jack Dunne on 9 December 1899 def. Jack Dunne on 10 January 1900 def. Jim Archer on 20 January 1900	Moved to America in March 1900	
8	Mick Dunn def. Jack Conlon	(Australia)	March 1900	1 October 1900	-	Was recognized as champion in N.S.W. for beating Jack Conlon in October 1899; Did not box for the title in March 1900, but was recognized as champion after Murphy left the country	
9	Otto Cribb def. Mick Dunn	(New Zealand)	1 October 1900	22 July 1901	-	-	
10	Mick Dunn def. Otto Cribb	(Australia)	22 July 1901	December 1901^{r}	-	Retired in December 1901 due to hand injury	
11	Frank Sturgeon def. Harry Dawson	(Australia)	13 January 1902	31 December 1902	-	-	
12	Jack Thompson def. Frank Sturgeon	(Australia)	31 December 1902	21 April 1903	def. Jim Richardson on 24 February 1903	-	
13	Arthur Cripps def. Jack Thompson	(Australia)	21 April 1903	7 February 1905	def. Jack Thompson on 7 July 1903 def. Jack Thompson on 8 August 1904 def. Al Neill on 2 November 1904	Moved to South Africa in July 1903; Championship was contested but not won by any contenders during Cripps absence	
14	Tim Murphy def. Arthur Cripps	(New Zealand)	7 February 1905	March 1905^{r}	-	Moved to South Africa in March 1905	
15	Arthur Cripps def. Ted Nelson	(Australia)	6 February 1906	July 1907^{r}	def. Jack Blackmore on 3 April 1906 def. Ed Williams on 9 July 1906 def. Tim Murphy on 6 October 1906 def. Ed Williams on 15 October 1906 def. Tim Murphy on 5 February 1907 def. Ed Williams on 18 February 1907 def. Ted Nelson on 11 March 1907 def. Jack Blackmore on 7 May 1907	Temporarily retired in July 1907	
16	Ted Nelson def. Ed Williams	(Australia)	15 July 1907	August 1907	-	Dropped to welterweight and lost in August 1907	
17	Ed Williams def. Arthur Cripps	(Australia)	8 October 1907	8 June 1908	def. Ted Nelson on 24 February 1908	-	
18	Jim Griffin def. Ed Williams	(New Zealand)	8 June 1908	July 1908^{r}	-	Moved up to heavyweight and lost in July 1908	
19	Ed Williams def. Pat O'Keefe	(Australia)	10 October 1908	August 1908^{s}	-	Was not booked to fight Griffin when he returned to middleweight in August 1908	
20	Arthur Cripps def. Jim Griffin	(Australia)	23 December 1908	26 April 1909	-	-	
21	Ed Williams def. Arthur Cripps	(Australia)	26 April 1909	11 March 1910	def. Arthur Cripps on 11 August 1909	-	
22	Arthur Cripps def. Ed Williams	(Australia)	11 March 1910	12 October 1910	def. Jerry Jerome on 10 August 1910	-	
23	Dave Smith def. Arthur Cripps	(New Zealand)	12 October 1910	December 1910^{s}	def. Ted Whiting on 12 November 1910	Fought over middleweight limit in December 1910	
24	Ted Whiting def. Paddy Lynch	(Australia)	22 April 1911	12 August 1911	def. Tim Land on 27 May 1911 nc. Gus Devitt on 19 July 1911	-	
25	Arthur Cripps def. Ted Whiting	(Australia)	12 August 1911	18 November 1911	drw. Gus Devitt on 11 October 1911	-	
26	Jimmy Clabby def. Arthur Cripps	(United States)	18 November 1911	November 1911^{r}	-	Fought at welterweight in late November 1911	
27	Ed Williams def. Roy Kenny	(Australia)	24 June 1912	August 1912^{s}	-	Sydney promoter refused to book Williams in August 1912, and he was no longer referred to as champion	
28	Jerry Jerome def. Charlie Godfrey	(Australia)	7 September 1912	February 1913^{r}	def. Bill Rudd on 21 September 1912 def. Ted Whiting on 12 October 1912 def. Arthur Cripps on 1 February 1913	Had moved up to heavyweight by mid February 1913	
29	Ted Whiting def. Gus Devitt	(Australia)	28 April 1913	August 1913^{s}	-	As of August 1913, the middleweight title was considered vacant	
30	Tim Land def. Gus Devitt	(Australia)	11 October 1913	6 December 1913	def. Bill Sonter on 25 October 1913	-	
31	Jerry Jerome def. Tim Land	(Australia)	6 December 1913	January 1914^{r}	def. Tim Land on 26 December 1913	Retired temporarily on medical advice in January 1914	
32	Arthur Cripps def. Tim Land	(Australia)	4 April 1914	August 1914^{s}	-	Lost title in August 1914, for not defending title for over six months	
33	Mick King def. Arthur Evernden	(Australia)	8 August 1914	November 1914^{r}	-	Boxed for world middleweight title in November 1914	
34	Ed Williams def. George Brewer	(Australia)	12 December 1914	January 1915^{s}	-	Fought below middleweight limit in January 1915	
35	Les Darcy def. Mick King	(Australia)	12 June 1915	June 1915^{r}	-	Was in the military by mid June 1915	
36	Fritz Holland def. Mick King	(United States)	22 January 1916	April 1916^{r}	-	Dropped to welterweight in April 1916	
37	Fred Kay def. Mick King	(Australia)	24 June 1916	6 January 1917	def. Tommy Uren on 16 December 1916	-	
38	Tommy Uren def. Fred Kay	(Australia)	6 January 1917	28 April 1917	def. Jimmy Clabby on 17 February 1917	-	
39	Jimmy Clabby def. Tommy Uren	(United States)	28 April 1917	14 July 1917	-	-	
40	Tommy Uren def. Jimmy Clabby	(Australia)	14 July 1917	May 1920^{s}	def. Fred Kay on 13 October 1917 def. Fernand Quendreux on 11 October 1919	Fought at welterweight in January 1919; Lost title in May 1920, due to extended stay in New Zealand	
41	Jim Baillie def. Tim O'Malley	(Australia)	18 June 1920	17 July 1920	-	-	
42	Hubie Hinton def. Jim Baillie	(Australia)	17 July 1920	24 July 1920	-	-	
43	Billy Shade def. Hubie Hinton	(United States)	24 July 1920	November 1920^{r}	def. Tommy Uren on 11 September 1920 def. Fred Kay on 9 October 1920	Returned to America in November 1920	
44	Tom O'Malley def. Max Gornik	(Australia)	27 December 1920	June 1921^{r}	-	Fought at light-heavyweight in May 1921; Announced relinquishment of title in October 1921, but Uren had already come to be regarded as champion in June	
45	Tommy Uren def. Jim Borland	(Australia)	10 June 1921	9 July 1921	-	-	
46	Frank Burns def. Tommy Uren	(Australia)	9 July 1921	December 1921^{r}	def. Hubie Hinton on 30 July 1921 def. Jimmy Clabby on 10 September 1921 def. Tommy Uren on 29 October 1921 def. Harry Stone on 26 November 1921	Moved to England in December 1921	
47	Tommy Uren def. Bill Butler	(Australia)	2 June 1922	19 August 1922	def. Jack Cole on 17 June 1922	-	
48	Charlie Ring def. Tommy Uren	(Australia)	19 August 1922	7 October 1922	-	-	
49	Alf Stewart def. Charlie Ring	(Australia)	7 October 1922	27 October 1924	def. Charlie Ring on 25 November 1922 def. Merv Williams on 3 March 1923 drw. Jack Cole on 2 April 1923 def. Les Kemp on 15 December 1923 def. Algie Daniels on 12 January 1924	Status as champion disputed in July 1924, due to not boxing for six months	
50	Tommy Uren def. Merv Williams	(Australia)	23 August 1924	6 June 1925	-	Status as champion disputed when Alf Stewart returned to boxing in October 1924	
51	Ted Monson def. Alf Stewart	(Australia)	27 October 1924	10 August 1925	def. Pud Segar on April 27, 1925 def. Tommy Uren on 20 July 1925	Status as champion disputed due to not boxing Tommy Uren for the title	
52	Harry Collins def. Tommy Uren	(England)	6 June 1925	July 1925^{s}	-	Championship disputed, Collins did not fight in match in which title was determined in July 1925	
53	Alf Stewart def. Ted Monson	(Australia)	10 August 1925	September, 1925^{s}	-	Was stripped of title in September, 1925, for declining to fight in the next six months, but claimed he was still champion	
54	Billy Edwards def. Tommy Uren	(New Zealand)	18 September 1926	2 April 1927	-	-	
55	Hughie Dwyer def. Billy Edwards	(Australia)	2 April 1927	November 1927^{r}	def. Frank Burns on 3 September 1927	Retired in November 1927	
56	Gordon Kiely def. Merv Williams	(Australia)	16 December 1927	13 January 1928	-	-	
57	Ted Monson def. Gordon Kiely	(Australia)	13 January 1928	20 April 1928	def. Tommy Uren on 3 February 1928	-	
58	Lachie McDonald def. Ted Monson	(Australia)	20 April 1928	6 July 1928	def. Gordon Kiely on 18 May 1928	-	
59	Ted Monson def. Lachie McDonald	(Australia)	6 July 1928	23 November 1929	nc. Merv Williams on 1 February 1929 def. Billy Harms on 5 June 1929 def. Billy Harms on 30 August 1929	-	
60	Jack Haines def. Ted Monson	(Australia)	23 November 1929	27 December 1930	def. Ted Monson on 8 March 1930 drw. Ambrose Palmer on 1 November 1930	-	
61	Ambrose Palmer def. Jack Haines	(Australia)	27 December 1930	25 July 1931	-	-	
62	Bob Thornton def. Ambrose Palmer	(Australia)	25 July 1931	19 September 1931	-	-	
63	Ambrose Palmer def. Bob Thornton	(Australia)	19 September 1931	21 March 1931	def. Fred Henneberry on 3 October 1931	-	
64	Fred Henneberry def. Ambrose Palmer	(Australia)	21 March 1932	20 March 1933	def. Bob Thornton on 9 May 1932	-	
65	Ron Richards def. Fred Henneberry	(Australia)	20 March 1933	5 June 1933	-	-	
66	Fred Henneberry def. Ron Richards	(Australia)	5 June 1933	21 December 1936	def. Tommy Jones on 14 September 1936	-	
67	Ron Richards def. Fred Henneberry	(Australia)	21 December 1936	February 1941^{r}	def. Jack McNamee on 23 November 1939 def. Fred Henneberry on 26 February 1940 def. Fred Henneberry on 16 December 1940	Retired in February 1941	
68	Al Basten def. Ern Clingan	(Australia)	25 June 1941	4 October 1941	def. Richie Sands on 31 August 1941	-	
69	Ron Richards def. Al Basten	(Australia)	4 October 1941	May 1942^{s}	def. Fred Henneberry on 27 November 1941	Stripped of title due to hiatus from boxing in May 1942	
70	Tommy Colteaux def. Bobby Clarke	(Australia)	28 May 1942	1 July 1943	def. Al Walker on 6 August 1942	-	
71	Hockey Bennell def. Tommy Colteaux	(Australia)	1 July 1943	October 1943^{s}	drw. Tommy Colteaux on 12 August 1943	Title stripped after loss at welterweight and broken hand preventing matches from being booked in October 1943	
72	Tommy Colteaux def. George Elliott	(Australia)	23 March 1944	21 December 1944	def. Cliff Bowen on July 20, 1944	Recognized as champion in Sydney, claim disputed by Stadiums Ltd.	
73	Cliff Bowen def. Tommy Colteaux	(Australia)	21 December 1944	February 1945^{s}	-	Recognized as champion by Leichhardt Stadium management Not regarded as champion by the public by February 1945	
74	Alan Westbury def. Jack McNamee	(Australia)	20 January 1945	16 February 1946	-	Recognized as champion by Stadiums Ltd. Popularly regarded as champion by February 1945	
75	Jack Kirkham def. Alan Westbury	(Australia)	16 February 1946	11 May 1946	def. Alan Westbury on 30 March 1946	-	
76	Dave Sands def. Jack Kirkham	(Australia)	11 May 1946	11 August 1952^{r}	def. Jack Kirkham on 7 June 1946 def. Al Bourke on 9 May 1952	Died in truck accident on 11 August 1952	
77	Al Bourke def. Ron Toohey	(Australia)	12 December 1952	December 1953^{r}	def. Alfie Sands on 17 April 1953 def. Carlo Marchini on 17 July 1953 def. Graham Higham on 20 November 1953 def. Bronco Johnson on 18 December 1953	Retired in December 1953	
78	Pran Mikus def. Bill Larrigo	(Lithuania)	5 July 1954	14 February 1955	-	-	
79	Carlo Marchini def. Pran Mikus	(Australia)	14 February 1955	10 June 1955	-	-	
80	Pran Mikus def. Carlo Marchini	(Lithuania)	10 June 1955	5 December 1955	-	-	
81	Billy McDonnell def. Pran Mikus	(Australia)	5 December 1955	19 October 1956	-	-	
82	Luigi Coluzzi def. Billy McDonnell	(Italy)	19 October 1956	19 January 1957	-	-	
83	Billy McDonnell def. Luigi Coluzzi	(Australia)	19 January 1957	28 February 1958	-	-	
84	Clive Stewart def. Billy McDonnell	(Australia)	28 February 1958	4 November 1960	def. Peter Read on 26 February 1960	-	
85	Peter Read def. Clive Stewart	(Australia)	4 November 1960	July 1962^{r}	def. Reg Hayes on 3 July 1961	Retired in July 1962	
86	Reg Hayes def. Sam Wheeler	(Australia)	22 April 1963	September, 1965^{r}	-	Retired in September, 1965	
87	Dimitri Michael def. Tony Barber	(Greece)	22 August 1966	10 July 1967	-	-	-
88	Tony Barber def. Dimitri Michael	(Australia)	10 July 1967	September, 1967^{r}	-	Retired in September, 1967	
89	Dick Blair def. Bob Murdoch	(Australia)	16 October 1968	19 September 1969	-	-	-
90	Billy Choules def. Dick Blair	(England)	19 September 1969	23 April 1970	-	-	-
91	Tony Mundine def. Billy Choules	(Australia)	23 April 1970	June 1975^{r}	-	Moved up to light heavyweight in 1975	
92	Semi Bula def. Greg McNamara	(Fiji)	25 June 1975	January 1977^{r}	-	Retired in January 1977	
93	Al Korovou def. Jimmy Gillon	(Fiji)	14 September 1977	26 July 1978	def. Wally Carr on 14 December 1977 def. Ray Ryan on 16 February 1978	-	-
94	Wally Carr def. Al Korovou	(Australia)	26 July 1978	November 1980^{r}	def. Benny Holt on 7 December 1978 def. John Krishna on 18 February 1979	Moved up to light heavyweight by November 1980	
95	Steve Dennis def. Billy Johnstone	(Australia)	11 December 1981	15 June 1983	def. Ricky Patterson on 1 May 1983	-	-
96	Ritchie Roberts def. Steve Dennis	(Australia)	15 June 1983	9 July 1984	def. Billy Johnstone on 12 February 1984	-	-
97	Emmanuel Otti def. Ritchie Roberts	(Uganda)	9 July 1984	21 September 1985	-	-	
98	Lou Cafaro def. Emmanuel Otti	(Australia)	21 September 1985	March 1986^{r}	def. Chad Hill on 21 March 1986	Went on hiatus from boxing after March 1986	
99	Mark Janssen def. Paul James	(Australia)	4 August 1986	December 1986^{r}	def. Paul James on 8 December 1986	Went on hiatus from boxing after December 1986	
100	Lou Cafaro def. Graeme Looker	(Australia)	16 July 1989	16 October 1989	-	-	
101	Craig Trotter def. Lou Cafaro	(Australia)	16 October 1989	20 April 1990	-	-	
102	Lou Cafaro def. Craig Trotter	(Australia)	20 April 1990	20 November 1991	-	-	
103	Vito Gaudiosi def. Lou Cafaro	(Australia)	20 November 1991	March 1992	-	Retired in March 1992	
104	Ernie Artango def. Craig Trotter	(Papua New Guinea)	22 September 1993	????	def. Darren Obah on 26 March 1994 drw. Craig Trotter on 7 October 1994 def. Craig Trotter on 10 February 1995	-	
105	Marc Bargero def. Ian McLeod	(Australia)	21 March 1997	????	def. Arama Tabuai on 12 September 1997 def. Abel Parker on 29 May 1998	-	
106	Sam Soliman def. Brad Mayo	(Australia)	9 July 1999	????	-	-	
107	Marc Bargero def. Brad Mayo	(Australia)	7 October 1999	11 February 2000	drw. Ian McLeod on 10 December 1999	-	
108	Josh Clenshaw def. Marc Bargero	(Australia)	11 February 2000	28 April 2000	-	-	
109	Nader Hamdan def. Josh Clenshaw	(Australia)	28 April 2000	????	-	-	
110	Ian McLeod def. Brandon Wood	(Australia)	26 May 2000	September, 2000^{r}	-	Competed for PABA Middle Title in September, 2000	
111	Darren Obah def. Andriy Khamula	(Australia)	11 December 2000	June 2001^{r}	-	Competed for IBF Pan Pacific Middle Title in June 2001	
112	John Wayne Parr def. Andriy Khamula	(Australia)	8 July 2001	24 October 2001	-	-	
113	Ian McLeod def. John Wayne Parr	(Australia)	24 October 2001	????	def. Nick Lundh on 13 September 2002	-	
114	Sakio Bika def. Arama Tabuai	(Cameroon)	11 April 2003	????	def. John Wayne Parr on 13 June 2003 def. Joel Bourke on 2 April 2004	-	
115	Daniel Dawson def. Josh Clenshaw	(Australia)	12 December 2004	????	-	-	
116	Adam Vella def. Matt Shaw	(Australia)	22 October 2005	????	def. Sonni Michael Angelo on 18 June 2006 def. Sean Connell on 24 November 2006	-	
117	Junior Talipeau def. George Livaditis	(Australia)	14 September 2007	February 2010^{s}	def. Peter Mitrevski Jr on 23 November 2007 def. William Hadlow on 4 April 2008 def. Robert Toomey on 31 October 2008 def. Jason Hartmann on 1 May 2009 def. Ben Crampton on 19 June 2009	Moved to super middleweight in late 2009, title considered vacant as of February 2010	
118	Johannes Mwetupunga def. Jason Hartmann	(Namibia)	26 March 2010	24 February 2012	def. William Hadlow on 14 May 2010 def. Kurt Bahram on 15 September 2010 def. Peter Mitrevski Jr on 8 December 2010 def. Omar Shaick on 15 April 2011	-	
119	Jarrod Fletcher def. Johannes Mwetupunga	(Australia)	24 February 2012	????	def. Les Piper on 20 April 2012	-	
120	Nathan Carroll def. Kurt Bahram	(Australia)	16 March 2013	11 July 2013	-	-	
121	Dennis Hogan def. Nathan Carroll	(Republic of Ireland)	11 July 2013	????	def. Robbie Bryant on 7 December 2013 def. Leroy Brown on 16 March 2014	-	
122	Dwight Ritchie def. Ryan Waters	(Australia)	21 November 2015	????	def. Ryan Waters on 21 November 2015	-	
123	Wes Capper def. Wade Ryan	(Australia)	26 August 2016	????	-	-	
124	David Toussaint def. Liam Hutchinson	(Australia)	8 September 2017	March 2018^{r}	-	Retired in March 2018, due to neurological condition	
125	Tej Pratap Singh def. Jason Leuken	(India)	14 December 2018	4 December 2020	def. Viktor Agateljan on 5 April 2019	-	
126	Issac Hardman def. Tej Pratap Singh	(Australia)	4 December 2020	Present	-	-	

== See also ==
- List of Australian female boxing champions
- List of Australian heavyweight boxing champions
- List of Australian cruiserweight boxing champions
- Boxing in Australia
