= Stan Wilson =

Stan Wilson may refer to:

- Stan Wilson (cricketer) (1948–2022), Australian cricketer
- Stan Wilson (footballer, born 1912) (1912–2004), Australian rules footballer for Essendon
- Stan Wilson (footballer, born 1928) (1928–2002), Australian rules footballer for Richmond
- Stan Wilson (folk musician) (1922–2005), American songwriter, singer, and guitarist
- Stan Wilson, actor in The Day After
- Stan Wilson, racing driver in the 2010 SCCA Pro Racing World Challenge season

== See also ==
- Stanley Wilson (disambiguation)
