= Wally Carr =

Australian boxer

- Born: 11 August 1954; Wellington, New South Wales, Australia
- Died: 13 April 2019 (aged 64); Newtown, New South Wales, Australia
- Nationality: Australian
- Height: 184 cm (6 ft 0 in)
- Style: Boxing
- Stance: Orthodox
- Years active: 1971–1981, 1983–1986

Professional boxing record
- Total: 100
- Wins: 53
- By knockout: 27
- Losses: 38
- By knockout: 8
- Draws: 9

Other information
- Notable relatives: Josh Addo-Carr
- Boxing record from BoxRec
- Last updated on: 30 January 2017

Wally Carr (11 August 1954 – 13 April 2019) was an Australian professional boxer. Carr held twelve titles across six different divisions across his 15-year career as a boxer. He was nicknamed "Wait-awhile-Wal".

== Early life ==
Wally Carr was born on 11 August 1954, two months after his father died by suicide by gunshot to the head. He was a Wiradjuri man who was born and raised in Wellington, New South Wales.

== Career ==
Carr held twelve titles across six different divisions across his 15-year career as a boxer, and was nicknamed "Wait-awhile-Wal".

Described by Boxing 1970–1980 as having "boxing ability to burn" and "outstanding skills", Wally Carr had 100 professional fights. His first fight was in South Sydney Leagues Club in 1971 at the age of 17 and his last fight was in 1986 at the age of 32 when he announced his retirement after fighting Doug Sam at the Bruce Stadium in Canberra.

With over twelve fights overseas in countries including, Zambia, New Zealand, Indonesia, Papua New Guinea, and Fiji, Carr got his first crack at a world champion, his 96th fight, when he fought Korean Super-Middleweight, Chong-Pal Park, the then current IBF's world Super-Middleweight champion, in Seoul in 1984. Carr lost on points. Despite Pal Park being a world champion, this fight was not a world title bout but a ten-round non-title fight. Had Carr won, he may have received a rematch with the world title at stake then.

Wally's fighting career spanned Super-Bantamweight to Heavyweight. He fought in 13 divisions, starting out at 8 stone 10 lbs and finishing up at 14 stone 10 lbs. His titles include NSW Welterweight Champion, Australasian Light Middleweight Champion, Australian Junior Middleweight Champion, Australian Middleweight Champion, Commonwealth (British Empire) Middleweight Champion, Australian Super-Middleweight Champion, Australian Light-Heavyweight Champion and Oriental Middleweight Champion.

== Recognition ==
Carr was selected as the inductee into the 2010 Australian National Boxing Hall of Fame Moderns category in recognition of his achievements.

== Death and legacy ==
Wally Carr died on 13 April 2019 due to stomach cancer.

During the indigenous round of the 2020 NRL Season, Carr's name was included on the inside of the collar on the player jersey for the Melbourne Storm, for whom Carr's grandson, Josh Addo-Carr plays.

== Personal life ==
Carr had four children (three daughters and one son) and two grandchildren. He was the grandfather of NRL player Josh Addo-Carr.

In 2010 Gaele Sobott published the biography of Wally Carr titled My Longest Round, which details his life from his earliest memories in Wellington, his boxing career, his battle with alcoholism, drug abuse, homelessness, and his final transition to sobriety and happiness. The book was written in close collaboration with Carr over the course of six years.

== Professional boxing titles ==
- Australia – New South Wales State welterweight title (146 1/4 Ibs)
- Australasian Super Welterweight Title (154 Ibs)
- Australian super welterweight title (154 1/4 Ibs)
- Australian middleweight title (160 Ibs)
- Australian light heavyweight title (172 Ibs)

== Professional boxing record ==
100 fights	53 wins	38 losses
By knockout	27	8
By decision	26	27
By disqualification	0	3
Draws	9	

No.	Result	Record	Opponent	Type	Date	Location	Notes
100	Loss	53–38–9	Doug Sam	KO	18 April 1986	Bruce Stadium, Canberra	
99	Loss	53–37–9	Gary Hubble	DQ	22 March 1986	Campbelltown Rugby League Club, Leumeah	Lost Australian Light Heavyweight Title
98	Loss	53–36–9	Dave Russell	PTS	26 April 1985	Festival Hall, Melbourne	
97	Win	53–35–9	Alan Black	KO	11 December 1984	Entertainment Centre, Perth	Won Australian Light Heavyweight Title
96	Loss	52–35–9	Chong Pal Park	PTS	7 October 1984	Seoul	
95	Loss	52–34–9	Pat Hailwood	PTS	31 August 1984	Marrickville RSL Club, Marrickville, Sydney	
94	Loss	52–33–9	Kevin Wagstaff	UD	1 June 1984	Marrickville RSL Club, Sydney	Lost vacant Australian Cruiserweight Title
93	Win	52–32–9	Tommy West	PTS	27 April 1984	Sydney	Won vacant Australian Light Heavyweight Title
92	Draw	51–32–9	Tommy West	PTS	24 February 1984	Marrickville RSL Club, Sydney	
91	Win	51–32–8	Gary Hubble	TKO	2 December 1983	Marrickville RSL Club, Sydney	
90	Win	50–32–8	Peter Hewitt	KO	14 October 1983	Marrickville RSL Club, Sydney	
89	Loss	49–32–8	Terry Archer	DQ	16 September 1983	Marrickville RSL Club, Sydney	Lost Australia – New South Wales State Heavyweight Title
88	Draw	49–31–8	Young Stone	PTS	5 August 1983	Marrickville RSL Club, Sydney	
87	Loss	49–31–7	Young Haumona	PTS	28 April 1983	Marrickville RSL Club, Sydney	
86	Loss	49–30–7	Stephane Ferrara	PTS	10 October 1981	Noumea	
85	Loss	49–29–7	Alex Sua	KO	27 May 1981	Auckland	
84	Win	49–28–7	Ken Eldridge	KO	20 November 1980	Marrickville RSL Club, Sydney	
83	Loss	48–28–7	Phil Kating	PTS	2 August 1980	Laucala Bay Hanger, Suva	
82	Win	48–27–7	Terry Fox	TKO	29 June 1980	Balmain Rugby League Club, Sydney	
81	Win	47–27–7	Fossie Schmidt	TKO	12 April 1980	Laucala Bay Hanger, Suva	
80	Win	46–27–7	Terry Fox	PTS	16 June 1979	Victoria Park, Dubbo	
79	Win	45–27–7	John Krishna	KO	18 February 1979	Hordern Pavilion, Sydney	Won Australian Middleweight Title
78	Loss	44–27–7	Monty Betham	PTS	11 February 1979	Auckland	Lost Australian National Boxing Federation Australasian Middleweight Title
77	Win	44–26–7	Torkano Marcos	KO	16 December 1978	Laucala Bay Hanger, Suva	
76	Win	43–26–7	Benny Holt	TKO	7 December 1978	Revesby Workers Club, Sydney	Won Australian Middleweight Title
75	Win	42–26–7	Al Korovou	TKO	26 July 1978	Bankstown RSL Club, Sydney	Won Australian Middleweight Title
74	Loss	41–26–7	Neil Pattell	PTS	30 June 1978	Festival Hall, Brisbane	
73	Loss	41–25–7	Al Korovou	PTS	14 December 1977	Marrickville RSL Club, Sydney	Lost Australian Middleweight Title
72	Win	41–24–7	Johnny Layton	PTS	12 October 1977	Marrickville RSL Club, Sydney	Won Australian Super Welterweight Title
71	Win	40–24–7	Rudy Siregar	PTS	11 September 1977	Surabaya	
70	Draw	39–24–7	Johnny Layton	PTS	27 October 1976	Bankstown Sports Club, Sydney	
69	Loss	39–24–6	Monty Betham	KO	23 September 1976	Town Hall, Wellington	Lost Commonwealth (British Empire) Middleweight Title
68	Loss	39–23–6	Neil Pattell	PTS	8 September 1976	Marrickville RSL Club, Sydney	Lost Australian Super Welterweight Title
67	Win	39–22–6	Eric King	KO	4 August 1976	North Sydney Rugby League Club, Sydney	
66	Win	38–22–6	Monty Betham	KO	12 July 1976	Town Hall, Wellington	Won vacant Australian National Boxing Federation Australasian Super Welterweight Title
65	Loss	37–22–6	Julius Luipa	TKO	1 July 1976	Chingola	Lost Australia – New South Wales State Welterweight Title
64	Win	37–21–6	Eric King	PTS	9 June 1976	Marrickville RSL Club, Sydney	
63	Win	36–21–6	Joe Keresi	KO	2 October 1975	Blacktown RSL Club, Sydney	
62	Win	35–21–6	Benny Holt	TKO	10 July 1975	Blacktown RSL Club, Sydney	
61	Win	34–21–6	Bernie Alexander	TKO	5 June 1975	Blacktown RSL Club, Sydney	
60	Loss	33–21–6	Benny Holt	PTS	22 May 1975	Blacktown RSL Club, Sydney	
59	Loss	33–20–6	Martin Beni	TKO	19 April 1975	Melbourne Town Hall, Melbourne	
58	Win	33–19–6	Billy O'Donnell	KO	3 April 1975	Blacktown RSL Club, Sydney	
57	Draw	32–19–6	Martin Beni	PTS	13 March 1975	Sir Hubert Murray Stadium, Port Moresby	
56	Win	32–19–5	Alan Aldenhoven	TKO	27 February 1975	Blacktown RSL Club, Sydney	
55	Loss	31–19–5	Dennis Enright	PTS	18 August 1974	RSA Hall, Invercargill	
54	Loss	31–18–5	Colin Cassidy	PTS	14 August 1974	Marrickville RSL Club, Sydney	
53	Loss	31–17–5	Andy Broome	TKO	13 June 1974	Blacktown RSL Club, Sydney	
52	Win	31–16–5	Billy O'Connor	KO	17 May 1974	Festival Hall, Melbourne	
51	Win	30–16–5	Wayne Cullen	KO	8 May 1974	North Sydney Rugby League Club, Sydney	
50	Win	29–16–5	Matt Ropis	PTS	4 April 1974	Blacktown RSL Club, Sydney	
49	Win	28–16–5	Barry Facer	TKO	28 March 1974	Blacktown RSL Club, Sydney	
48	Win	27–16–5	Fred Rolando Pastor	PTS	15 March 1974	Festival Hall, Melbourne	
47	Win	26–16–5	Martin Ross	KO	14 February 1974	Blacktown RSL Club, Sydney	
46	Win	25–16–5	Elley Dennis	PTS	1 December 1973	North Sydney Rugby League Club, Sydney	
45	Loss	24–16–5	Antonio Oke	PTS	10 November 1973	Noumea	
44	Loss	24–15–5	Bobby Cotterill	PTS	13 September 1973	Blacktown RSL Club, Sydney	
43	Loss	24–14–5	Colin Cassidy	TKO	15 August 1973	Marrickville RSL Club, Sydney	
42	Win	24–13–5	Les Knox	PTS	19 June 1973	Cronulla Workingmen's Club, Sydney	
41	Loss	23–13–5	David Hill	PTS	14 June 1973	Blacktown RSL Club, Sydney	
40	Draw	23–12–5	Jim Metcalfe	PTS	17 May 1973	Blacktown RSL Club, Sydney	
39	Win	23–12–4	Mick Maher	PTS	8 May 1973	Marrickville RSL Club, Sydney	
38	Win	22–12–4	Binky Rominski	PTS	2 May 1973	Manly Warringah Leagues Club, Sydney	
37	Win	21–12–4	Eric King	PTS	19 April 1973	Blacktown RSL Club, Sydney	
36	Loss	20–12–4	Rod Connors	PTS	28 February 1973	South Sydney Rugby League Club, Sydney	
35	Loss	20–11–4	Alan Mander	DQ	7 February 1973	North Sydney Rugby League Club, Sydney	
34	Win	20–10–4	Ceddy McGrady	PTS	18 January 1973	South Sydney Rugby League Club, Sydney	
33	Win	19–10–4	Ceddy McGrady	PTS	30 November 1972	South Sydney Rugby League Club, Sydney	
32	Win	18–10–4	Binky Rominski	KO	15 November 1972	North Sydney Rugby League Club, Sydney	
31	Win	17–10–4	Matt Davis	PTS	31 October 1972	Cronulla Workingmen's Club, Sydney	
30	Win	16–10–4	Cousin Bob West	PTS	18 October 1972	North Sydney Rugby League Club, Sydney	
29	Loss	15–10–4	Jim Metcalfe	PTS	10 October 1972	Marrickville RSL Club, Sydney	
28	Loss	15–9–4	Rod Connors	PTS	26 September 1972	Cronulla Workingmen's Club, Sydney	
27	Draw	15–8–4	Jeff Malcolm	PTS	20 September 1972	North Sydney Rugby League Club, Sydney	
26	Loss	15–8–3	Ross Armstrong	PTS	17 August 1972	South Sydney Rugby League Club, Sydney	
25	Win	15–7–3	Ross Armstrong	PTS	10 August 1972	South Sydney Rugby League Club, Sydney	
24	Win	14–7–3	Binky Rominski	PTS	11 July 1972	Corrimal Rugby League Club, Wollongong	
23	Loss	13–7–3	Jim Metcalfe	PTS	22 June 1972	South Sydney Rugby League Club, Sydney	
22	Win	13–6–3	Eric Larche	PTS	15 June 1972	South Sydney Rugby League Club, Sydney	
21	Loss	12–6–3	Neville Williams	KO	7 June 1972	Riverwood Legion Club, Sydney	
20	Win	12–5–3	Les Knox	PTS	1 June 1972	South Sydney Rugby League Club, Sydney	
19	Win	11–5–3	Les Knox	PTS	25 May 1972	South Sydney Rugby League Club, Sydney	
18	Loss	10–5–3	Lance McConnell	PTS	2 March 1972	South Sydney Rugby League Club, Sydney	
17	Loss	10–4–3	Lance McConnell	PTS	8 February 1972	Marrickville RSL Club, Sydney	
16	Draw	10–3–3	Frank Geebung	PTS	3 February 1972	South Sydney Rugby League Club, Sydney	
15	Loss	10–3–2	Jim Metcalfe	PTS	27 January 1972	South Sydney Rugby League Club, Sydney	
14	Win	10–2–2	Alan Scott	KO	11 January 1972	Marrickville RSL Club, Sydney	
13	Win	9–2–2	Ern McNeill	KO	16 December 1971	South Sydney Rugby League Club, Sydney	
12	Win	8–2–2	Frank Geebung	PTS	9 December 1971	South Sydney Rugby League Club, Sydney	
11	Win	7–2–2	Wayne Oldham	KO	7 December 1971	Penrith Rugby League Club, Sydney	
10	Win	6–2–2	Elley Dennis	PTS	1 December 1971	North Sydney Rugby League Club, Sydney	
9	Win	5–2–2	Cousin Bob West	KO	15 November 1971	Marrickville RSL Club, Sydney	
8	Win	4–2–2	Laurie Johnson	TKO	4 November 1971	South Sydney Rugby League Club, Sydney	
7	Win	3–2–2	Graham Murray	PTS	18 October 1971	Marrickville RSL Club, Sydney	
6	Draw	2–2–2	Dennis Cutmore	PTS	13 October 1971	North Sydney Rugby League Club, Sydney	
5	Loss	2–2–1	Frank Geebung	PTS	30 September 1971	South Sydney Rugby League Club, Sydney	
4	Win	2–1–1	Graham Murray	PTS	15 September 1971	North Sydney Rugby League Club, Sydney	
3	Loss	1–1–1	Laurie Johnson	PTS	9 September 1971	South Sydney Rugby League Club, Sydney	
2	Win	1–0–1	Graham Murray	PTS	2 September 1971	South Sydney Rugby League Club, Sydney	
1	Draw	0–0–1	Graham Murray	PTS	26 August 1971	South Sydney Rugby League Club, Sydney	
