= Dave Sands =

Australian boxer (1926–1952)

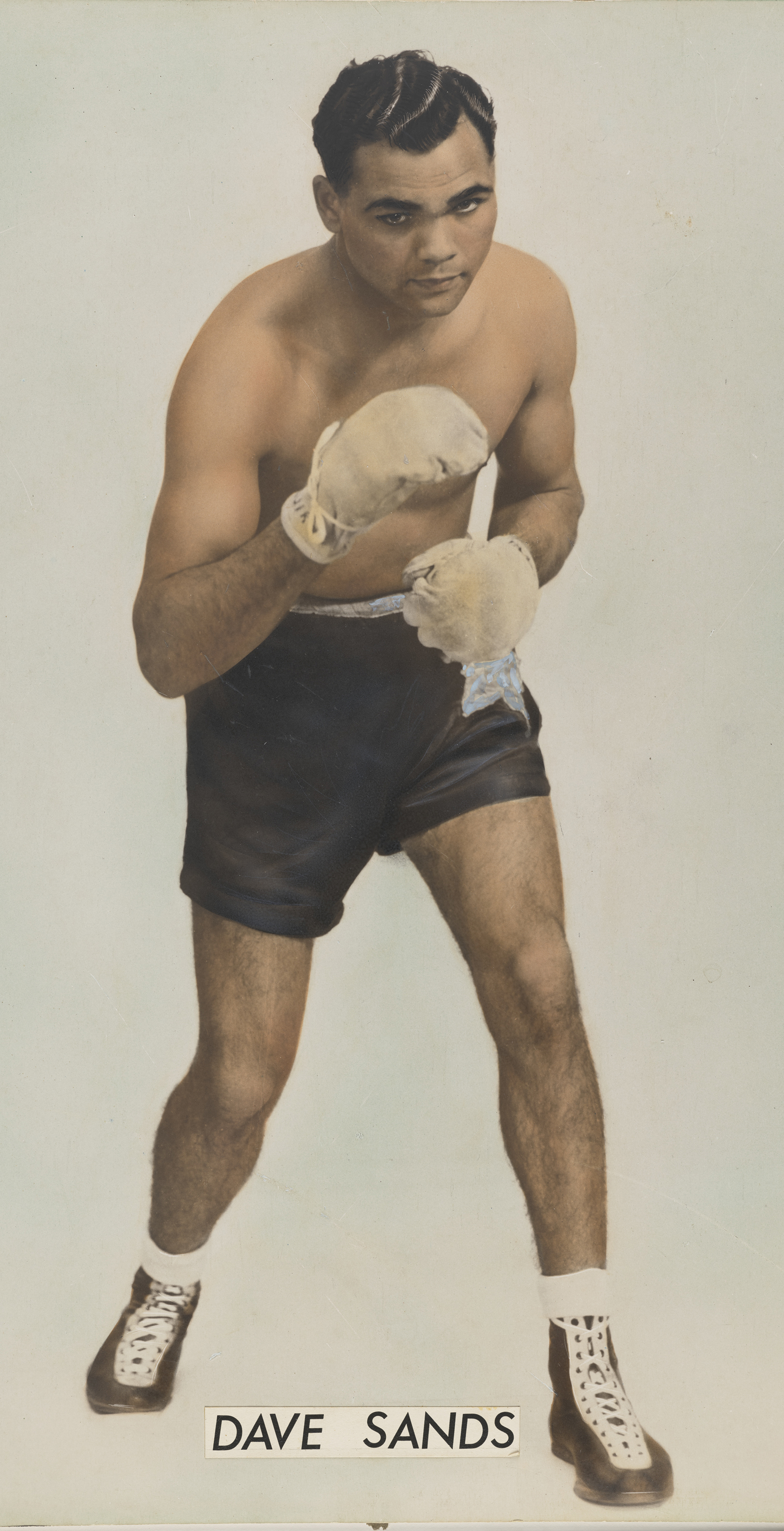

Personal information
- Nationality: Australian
- Born: David Ritchie; 4 February 1926 Kempsey, New South Wales, Australia
- Died: 11 August 1952 (aged 26) Dungog, New South Wales, Australia
- Height: 1.79 m (5 ft 10 in)
- Weight: Middleweight; Light-heavyweight; Heavyweight

Boxing career
- Stance: Orthodox

Boxing record
- Total fights: 100
- Wins: 87
- Win by KO: 52
- Losses: 10
- Draws: 1
- No contests: 2

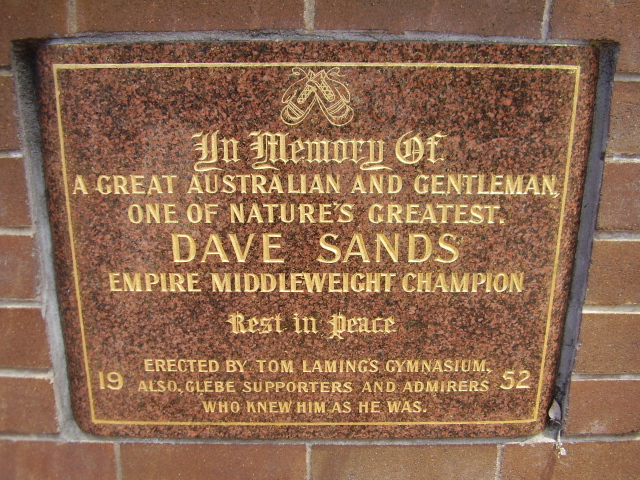
Memorial to Dave Sands in Glebe, Sydney

Dave Sands (born David Ritchie; 4 February 1926 – 11 August 1952) was an Aboriginal Australian professional boxer.

The man the Americans called the "boxer with the educated left hand" received his due when he was inducted into the World Boxing Hall of Fame in 1998 at a ceremony held in Los Angeles, recognised as one of the greatest boxers never to have won a world title.

Sands was the 2009 Inductee for the Australian National Boxing Hall of Fame Veterans category.

== Early life ==
Sands was born at Burnt Bridge near Kempsey, New South Wales. He was the fifth of eight children of George and Mabel (née Russell) Ritchie. His parents were both Aboriginal, from the Dunghutti people, and his father worked as a rodeo-rider and timber-cutter.

Sands' brothers also boxed and, in doing so emulated their father and their maternal great-uncle Bailey Russell, who had been a noted bare-knuckle fighter.

In 1939, one of Sands' brothers Percival (Percy) went to Newcastle to train with Tom Maguire who ran the Star Gymnasium there and started going by the name 'Sands'. At age 15, Sands joined Percy there and lived at the gym. Ultimately Sands, and his five brothers took on the Sands name, taken from train guard "Snowy" Sands who helped the travel, fare-free, to Newcastle. They became known as "The Fighting Sands Brothers" and Sands became the most successful and the most well known.

== Career ==
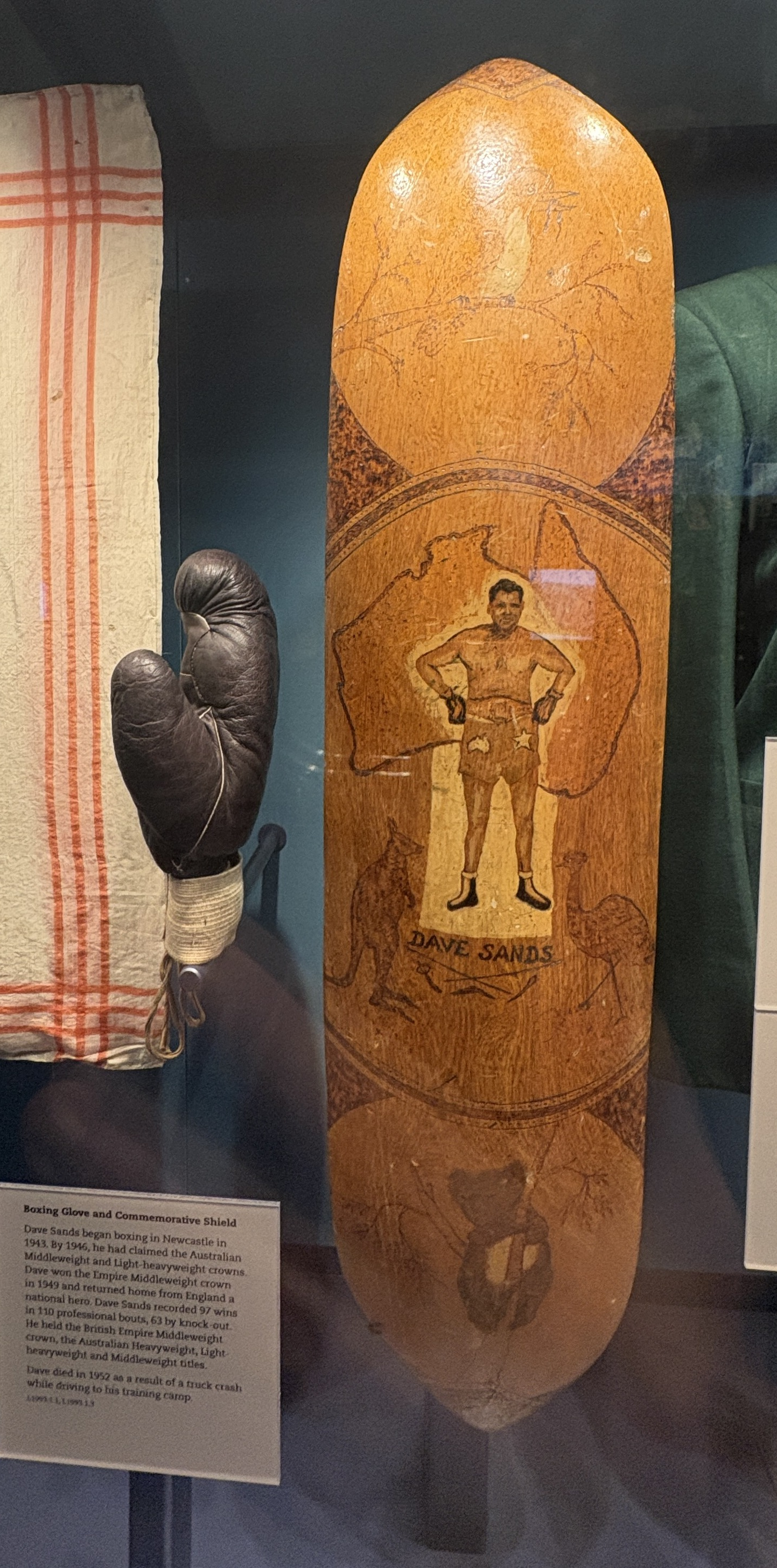

While training, and without Maguire's knowledge, Sands fought a four-round preliminary bout in August 1941 at Newcastle Stadium which he won in the first round. Maguire disapproved but it showed Sands skills and, by the end of 1942, he had knocked out a dozen opponents in the area and was soon boxing in twelve-round matches in front of large crowds in Brisbane and Sydney.

In May 1946, Sands defeated Jack Kirkham for the Australian middleweight title and, three months later, knocked out Jack Johnson in four rounds to become national light-heavyweight champion. By 1948, he had beaten all his local opponents and most American 'imports' who had travelled to Australia. In February 1949, following his 'mauling' of a French fighter Tony Toniolo in less than two minutes, English promoter Jack Solomons took an interest in him.

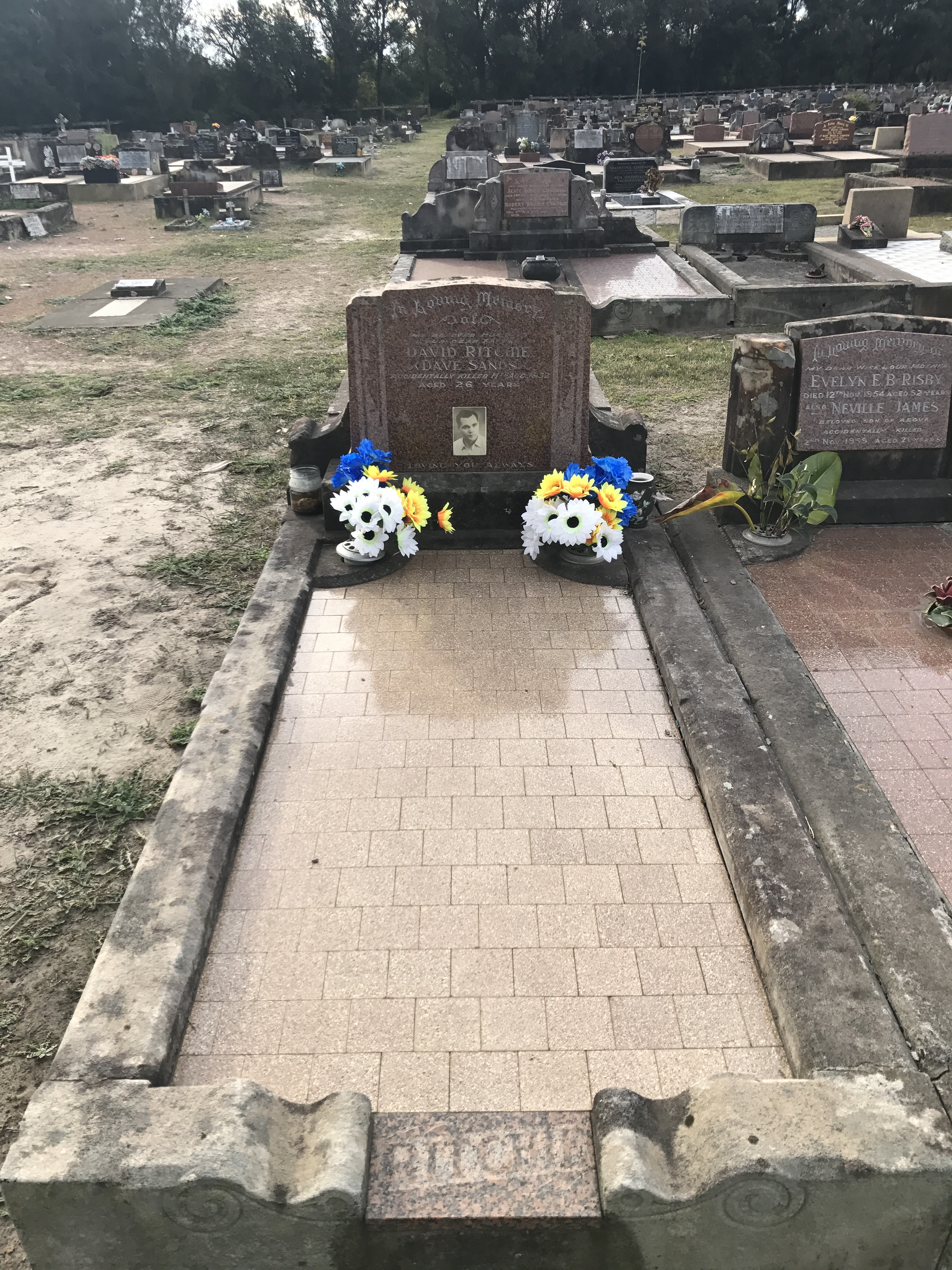
Grave of Dave Sands at Sandgate Cemetery.

In 1949 Sands travelled to London where he began a campaign for the world title, however, despite an enthusiastic reception from the British press, he had limited success. There, on 4 April 1949, while suffering from a swollen, recently vaccinated arm, he was outpointed by Tommy Yarosz. Fifteen days later Sands won, dismally, against a spoiler, Lucien Caboche.

Maguire, who had travelled with him, then moved him to Newcastle-upon-Tyne, where friendly locals and a promoter Joe Shepherd restored his confidence. After two solid victories, he returned to London and in July thrashed the much-fancied Robert Villemain in the 'fight of the year'. On 6 September, Sands demolished Dick Turpin in 2 minutes 35 seconds for the British Empire middleweight title.

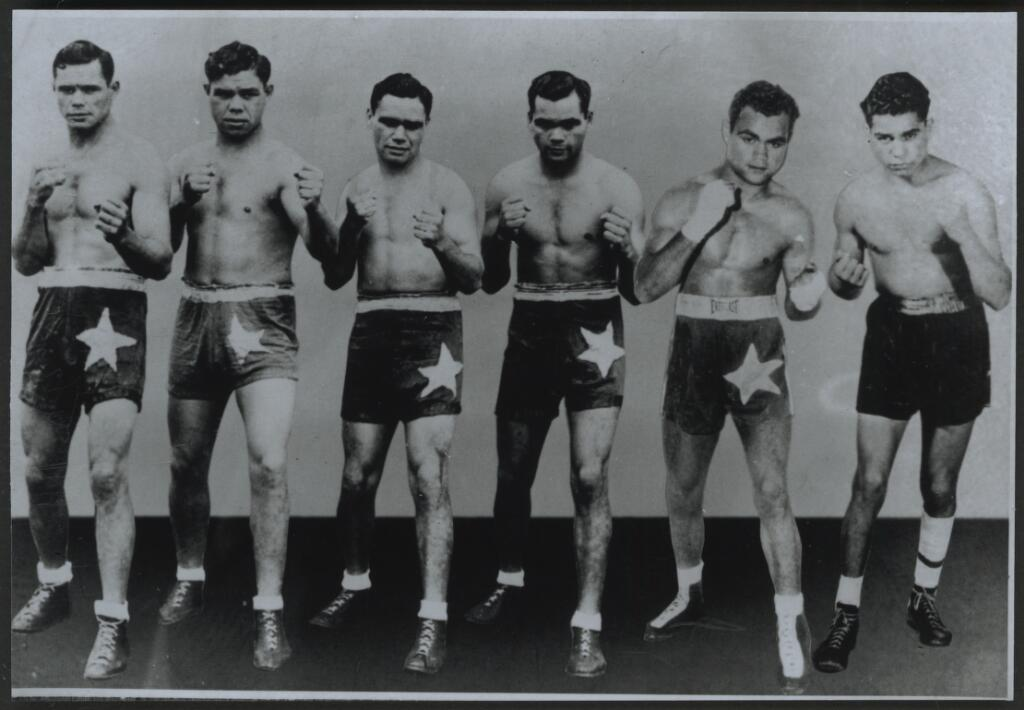
Dave (fourth from left) with his five brothers)

Shortly after Sands triumphal return to Australia in November 1949, he survived a serious accident when the steering on his motorcar failed, and the vehicle somersaulted into a creek. Over the next eighteen months, he contested and won nine fights, one of them a fifteen-rounder in September 1950 in which he took the Australian heavyweight championship from Alf Gallagher.

Sands had become a leading contender for the world middleweight title and Maguire vainly sought to arrange a bout with the American champion Sugar Ray Robinson. In the tricky maze of international boxing promotion, his efforts were marked by a paper chase of offers and counter-offers. Sands defeated Mel Brown in London in July 1951 in a preliminary to a title fight between Robinson and another contender Randolph Turpin. Had Maguire's negotiations succeeded, Sands would have been in Turpin's place and probably would have beaten an unfit Robinson, as did Turpin.

In October 1951, Sands won two fights in the United States. Back home, he hoped for a world title-bout, but he was estranged from Maguire. A new manager Bede Kerr reopened discussions with Robinson's connections, but the chance never came.

== Personal life ==
On 11 August 1945, Sands married 18-year-old Bessie Emma Burns at St Paul's Church of England, Stockton, New South Wales.

== Death ==
On 11 August 1952, the truck Sands was driving with 15 passengers overturned at roadworks near Dungog, New South Wales when ranked number 3 in the world. He died of head and internal injuries that evening in the local hospital and was buried at Sandgate Cemetery, near Newcastle, New South Wales.

His wife, and their son and two daughters survived him; their third daughter was born in November. Sands had earned about £30,000, but it went on manager's fees, travel costs, tax, family expenses and generosity to his kin. A public appeal raised more than £2500, sufficient to pay off his Stockton home and create a trust fund for his family.

== Legacy ==
On 9 December 1986 Sands was inducted into the Sport Australia Hall of Fame and later, in 1998, was inducted into the World Boxing Hall of Fame.

In May 2022 Sands' family were presented with a replica belt, in recognition of his achievements, at NSW Parliament House as he never received one in life.

His portrait, by an unknown photographer, is held at the National Portrait Gallery.

== Professional boxing record ==
100 fights	87 wins	10 losses
By knockout	52	2
By decision	34	8
By disqualification	1	0
Draws	1	
No contests	2	

No.	Result	Record	Opponent	Type	Round, time	Date	Age	Location	Notes
100	Win	87–10–1 (2)	Jim Woods	KO	4 (15), 2:19	Jul 9, 1952	26 years, 156 days	Wagga Wagga Stadium, Wagga Wagga, Australia	Won vacant Australian heavyweight title
99	Win	86–10–1 (2)	Al Bourke	KO	5 (15), 2:19	May 9, 1952	26 years, 95 days	West Melbourne Stadium, Melbourne, Australia	Retained Australasian light heavyweight title; Retained Commonwealth middleweight title
98	Win	85–10–1 (2)	Chub Keith	TKO	14 (15), 2:20	Mar 31, 1952	26 years, 56 days	Sydney Stadium, Sydney, Australia	Won vacant Australasian light heavyweight title
97	Win	84–10–1 (2)	Ron Toohey	TKO	10 (12), 2:15	Feb 8, 1952	26 years, 4 days	West Melbourne Stadium, Melbourne, Australia	
96	Loss	83–10–1 (2)	Yolande Pompey	TKO	7 (10), 2:15	Nov 13, 1951	25 years, 282 days	Harringay Arena, Harringay, London, England, UK	
95	Win	83–9–1 (2)	Henry Brimm	KO	10 (10), 0:50	Oct 30, 1951	25 years, 268 days	Memorial Auditorium, Buffalo, New York, US	
94	Win	82–9–1 (2)	Bobo Olson	UD	10	Oct 3, 1951	25 years, 241 days	Chicago Stadium, Chicago, Illinois, US	
93	Win	81–9–1 (2)	Doug Miller	PTS	10	Aug 20, 1951	25 years, 197 days	Sportsdrome, Birmingham, West Midlands, England, UK	
92	Win	80–9–1 (2)	Mel Brown	PTS	10	Jul 10, 1951	25 years, 156 days	Earls Court Arena, Kensington, London, England, UK	
91	Win	79–9–1 (2)	Henry Bray	TKO	7 (12)	Feb 10, 1951	25 years, 6 days	Newcastle Stadium, Newcastle, Australia	
90	Win	78–9–1 (2)	Irvin Steen	PTS	12	Feb 5, 1951	25 years, 1 day	Sydney Stadium, Sydney, Australia	
89	Win	77–9–1 (2)	Boy Brooks	PTS	12	Jan 12, 1951	24 years, 342 days	West Melbourne Stadium, Melbourne, Australia	
88	Win	76–9–1 (2)	Don Mullett	PTS	12	Dec 14, 1950	24 years, 313 days	Town Hall, Wellington, New Zealand	
87	Win	75–9–1 (2)	Alf Gallagher	PTS	15	Sep 4, 1950	24 years, 212 days	Sydney Stadium, Sydney, Australia	Won vacant Australian heavyweight title
86	Win	74–9–1 (2)	Henry Brimm	TKO	2 (12), 0:45	Aug 8, 1950	24 years, 185 days	Sydney Stadium, Sydney, Australia	
85	Win	73–9–1 (2)	Boy Brooks	UD	10	May 12, 1950	24 years, 97 days	Happy World Arena, Singapore	
84	Win	72–9–1 (2)	Boy Brooks	DQ	4 (10)	Apr 21, 1950	24 years, 76 days	Happy World Arena, Singapore	Brooks disqualified for refusing to come out for Round 4
83	Win	71–9–1 (2)	Bobo Olson	PTS	12	Mar 20, 1950	24 years, 44 days	Sydney Stadium, Sydney, Australia	
82	Win	70–9–1 (2)	Pete Mead	PTS	10	Oct 11, 1949	23 years, 249 days	Harringay Arena, Harringay, London, England, UK	
81	Win	69–9–1 (2)	Dick Turpin	KO	1 (15), 2:45	Sep 6, 1949	23 years, 214 days	Harringay Arena, Harringay, London, England, UK	Won Commonwealth middleweight title
80	Win	68–9–1 (2)	Robert Villemain	PTS	10	Jul 5, 1949	23 years, 151 days	Olympia, Kensington, London, England, UK	
79	Win	67–9–1 (2)	Jan de Bruin	PTS	10	Jun 3, 1949	23 years, 119 days	New St. James Hall, Newcastle, Tyne and Wear, England, UK	
78	Win	66–9–1 (2)	Jackie Jones	TKO	1 (10), 1:20	May 16, 1949	23 years, 101 days	New St. James Hall, Newcastle, Tyne and Wear, England, UK	
77	Win	65–9–1 (2)	Lucien Caboche	PTS	10	Apr 19, 1949	23 years, 74 days	Royal Albert Hall, Kensington, London, England, UK	
76	Loss	64–9–1 (2)	Tommy Yarosz	PTS	10	Apr 4, 1949	23 years, 59 days	Harringay Arena, Harringay, London, England, UK	
75	Win	64–8–1 (2)	Antoine Toniolo	TKO	1 (12), 1:10	Feb 18, 1949	23 years, 14 days	West Melbourne Stadium, Melbourne, Australia	
74	Win	63–8–1 (2)	Tommy Prince	KO	3 (12)	Dec 17, 1948	22 years, 317 days	Newcastle Stadium, Newcastle, Australia	
73	Win	62–8–1 (2)	Len Dittmar	TKO	5 (12)	Oct 9, 1948	22 years, 248 days	West Melbourne Stadium, Melbourne, Australia	
72	Win	61–8–1 (2)	Doug Brown	TKO	1 (12), 2:58	Sep 27, 1948	22 years, 236 days	Sydney Stadium, Sydney, Australia	
71	Win	60–8–1 (2)	Billy Meyers	PTS	12	Aug 27, 1948	22 years, 205 days	Griffith Stadium, Griffith, Australia	
70	Win	59–8–1 (2)	George Allen	TKO	6 (12)	Jun 26, 1948	22 years, 143 days	Newcastle Stadium, Newcastle, Australia	
69	Win	58–8–1 (2)	Billy Myers	PTS	12	Jun 12, 1948	22 years, 129 days	Newcastle Stadium, Newcastle, Australia	
68	NC	57–8–1 (2)	Jackie Marr	NC	7 (12)	Apr 19, 1948	22 years, 75 days	Town Hall, Auckland, New Zealand	Referee stopped as he felt Marr was over matched
67	Win	57–8–1 (1)	Don Mullett	PTS	12	Apr 10, 1948	22 years, 66 days	Petone Recreation Ground, Petone, New Zealand	
66	Win	56–8–1 (1)	Jackie Marr	PTS	12	Mar 27, 1948	22 years, 52 days	Petone Recreation Ground, Petone, New Zealand	
65	Win	55–8–1 (1)	Doug Rollinson	KO	1 (12)	Mar 6, 1948	22 years, 31 days	Petone Recreation Ground, Petone, New Zealand	
64	Win	54–8–1 (1)	Alabama Kid	KO	4 (12)	Feb 7, 1948	22 years, 3 days	Newcastle Stadium, Newcastle, Australia	
63	Win	53–8–1 (1)	Alex Buxton	PTS	12	Nov 29, 1947	21 years, 298 days	Newcastle Stadium, Newcastle, Australia	
62	Win	52–8–1 (1)	George Allen	TKO	9 (12)	Nov 24, 1947	21 years, 293 days	Sydney Stadium, Sydney, Australia	
61	Win	51–8–1 (1)	George 'Wildcat' Henry	PTS	12	Oct 13, 1947	21 years, 251 days	Sydney Stadium, Sydney, Australia	
60	Win	50–8–1 (1)	George 'Wildcat' Henry	PTS	12	Sep 8, 1947	21 years, 216 days	Sydney Stadium, Sydney, Australia	
59	Win	49–8–1 (1)	George Allen	KO	2 (12), 2:10	Aug 5, 1947	21 years, 182 days	Sydney Stadium, Sydney, Australia	
58	Win	48–8–1 (1)	George Allen	TKO	1 (12)	May 31, 1947	21 years, 116 days	West Melbourne Stadium, Melbourne, Australia	
57	NC	47–8–1 (1)	Emory Jackson	NC	7 (12)	May 3, 1947	21 years, 88 days	West Melbourne Stadium, Melbourne, Australia	The referee declared a no contest as Emory had not given his best
56	Win	47–8–1	Emory Jackson	PTS	12	Apr 14, 1947	21 years, 69 days	Sydney Stadium, Sydney, Australia	
55	Win	46–8–1	Art Lind	TKO	7 (12)	Mar 24, 1947	21 years, 48 days	Sydney Stadium, Sydney, Australia	
54	Loss	45–8–1	Emory Jackson	PTS	12	Feb 24, 1947	21 years, 20 days	Sydney Stadium, Sydney, Australia	
53	Win	45–7–1	Alf Gallagher	KO	3 (15)	Nov 30, 1946	20 years, 299 days	Sydney Stadium, Sydney, Australia	Retained Australian light heavyweight title
52	Draw	44–7–1	Jackie Marr	PTS	12	Nov 23, 1946	20 years, 292 days	West Melbourne Stadium, Melbourne, Australia	
51	Win	44–7	Jack Johnson	TKO	1 (15)	Oct 12, 1946	20 years, 250 days	West Melbourne Stadium, Melbourne, Australia	Retained Australian light heavyweight title
50	Win	43–7	Jack Johnson	TKO	4 (15), 2:57	Aug 24, 1946	20 years, 201 days	Sydney Stadium, Sydney, Australia	Won Australian light heavyweight title
49	Win	42–7	Jack Kirkham	KO	5 (15)	Jun 7, 1946	20 years, 123 days	Brisbane Stadium, Brisbane, Australia	Retained Australian middleweight title
48	Win	41–7	Jack Kirkham	TKO	12 (15)	May 11, 1946	20 years, 96 days	Sydney Stadium, Sydney, Australia	Won Australian middleweight title
47	Win	40–7	Jimmy Brunt	TKO	1 (12), 2:00	Mar 2, 1946	20 years, 26 days	Sydney Stadium, Sydney, Australia	
46	Win	39–7	Alex Buxton	PTS	12	Jan 26, 1946	19 years, 356 days	Sydney Stadium, Sydney, Australia	
45	Win	38–7	Tommy Colteaux	RTD	2 (12)	Dec 27, 1945	19 years, 326 days	Leichhardt Stadium, Sydney, Australia	
44	Win	37–7	Al Walker	PTS	12	Nov 24, 1945	19 years, 293 days	Newcastle Stadium, Newcastle, Australia	
43	Win	36–7	Max Cameron	TKO	11 (15)	Oct 20, 1945	19 years, 258 days	Newcastle Stadium, Newcastle, Australia	Won vacant New South Wales State middleweight title
42	Win	35–7	Billy Myers	KO	5 (12)	Aug 11, 1945	19 years, 188 days	Newcastle Stadium, Newcastle, Australia	
41	Win	34–7	Tom Laming	KO	2 (12)	Jul 7, 1945	19 years, 153 days	Newcastle Stadium, Newcastle, Australia	
40	Win	33–7	Herb Broom	KO	3 (12)	Jun 16, 1945	19 years, 132 days	Newcastle Stadium, Newcastle, Australia	
39	Win	32–7	Max Cameron	RTD	6 (12)	May 10, 1945	19 years, 95 days	Leichhardt Stadium, Sydney, Australia	
38	Win	31–7	Al Walker	KO	7 (12)	May 5, 1945	19 years, 90 days	Newcastle Stadium, Newcastle, Australia	
37	Win	30–7	Max Cameron	PTS	12	Mar 29, 1945	19 years, 53 days	Leichhardt Stadium, Sydney, Australia	
36	Win	29–7	Al Walker	PTS	12	Mar 3, 1945	19 years, 27 days	Newcastle Stadium, Newcastle, Australia	
35	Win	28–7	Jack Brander	KO	2 (12)	Feb 3, 1945	18 years, 365 days	Newcastle Stadium, Newcastle, Australia	
34	Win	27–7	Jackie Marr	PTS	12	Dec 16, 1944	18 years, 316 days	Newcastle Stadium, Newcastle, Australia	
33	Win	26–7	Jimmy Grey	KO	8 (12), 1:00	Dec 1, 1944	18 years, 301 days	Brisbane Stadium, Brisbane, Australia	
32	Loss	25–7	Jackie Marr	PTS	12	Nov 18, 1944	18 years, 288 days	Newcastle Stadium, Newcastle, Australia	
31	Win	25–6	Max Cameron	TKO	3 (12)	Oct 21, 1944	18 years, 260 days	Newcastle Stadium, Newcastle, Australia	
30	Win	24–6	Tom Laming	KO	7 (12)	Sep 23, 1944	18 years, 232 days	Newcastle Stadium, Newcastle, Australia	
29	Win	23–6	Jackie Day	TKO	5 (12)	Sep 2, 1944	18 years, 211 days	Newcastle Stadium, Newcastle, Australia	
28	Win	22–6	Jimmy Grey	PTS	12	Aug 5, 1944	18 years, 183 days	Newcastle Stadium, Newcastle, Australia	
27	Win	21–6	Bob Coughlan	PTS	12	Jul 15, 1944	18 years, 162 days	Newcastle Stadium, Newcastle, Australia	
26	Win	20–6	Dal Conway	TKO	4 (12), 0:42	Jun 30, 1944	18 years, 147 days	Brisbane Stadium, Brisbane, Australia	
25	Win	19–6	Bill Bayliss	KO	2 (12), 2:30	Jun 2, 1944	18 years, 119 days	Brisbane Stadium, Brisbane, Australia	
24	Loss	18–6	Doug Brown	PTS	12	May 13, 1944	18 years, 99 days	Newcastle Stadium, Newcastle, Australia	
23	Loss	18–5	Doug Brown	PTS	12	Apr 15, 1944	18 years, 71 days	Newcastle Stadium, Newcastle, Australia	
22	Win	18–4	Jack Mitchell	TKO	12 (12)	Apr 1, 1944	18 years, 57 days	Newcastle Stadium, Newcastle, Australia	
21	Win	17–4	Jack Buchanan	KO	2 (6)	Feb 25, 1944	18 years, 21 days	Theatre Royal, Kempsey, Australia	
20	Loss	16–4	Jack McNamee	PTS	12	Feb 5, 1944	18 years, 1 day	Newcastle Stadium, Newcastle, Australia	
19	Win	16–3	Bobby Clarke	KO	6 (12)	Jan 22, 1944	17 years, 352 days	Newcastle Stadium, Newcastle, Australia	
18	Win	15–3	George Cook	PTS	12	Dec 18, 1943	17 years, 317 days	Newcastle Stadium, Newcastle, Australia	
17	Loss	14–3	Billy Myers	PTS	12	Nov 27, 1943	17 years, 296 days	Newcastle Stadium, Newcastle, Australia	
16	Win	14–2	George Cook	PTS	12	Nov 20, 1943	17 years, 289 days	Newcastle Stadium, Newcastle, Australia	
15	Win	13–2	Bobby Rivers	TKO	9 (12)	Oct 23, 1943	17 years, 261 days	Newcastle Stadium, Newcastle, Australia	
14	Win	12–2	Cliff Bowen	TKO	2 (12)	Sep 11, 1943	17 years, 219 days	Newcastle Stadium, Newcastle, Australia	
13	Win	11–2	Ken McDermott	KO	1 (12)	Aug 21, 1943	17 years, 198 days	Newcastle Stadium, Newcastle, Australia	
12	Win	10–2	Ken McDermott	RTD	10 (12)	Aug 14, 1943	17 years, 191 days	Newcastle Stadium, Newcastle, Australia	
11	Win	9–2	Eddie Truxel	PTS	6	Jul 17, 1943	17 years, 163 days	Newcastle Stadium, Newcastle, Australia	
10	Win	8–2	Bill Warren	PTS	6	Jul 3, 1943	17 years, 149 days	Newcastle Stadium, Newcastle, Australia	
9	Win	7–2	Snowy Stevens	PTS	6	Jun 19, 1943	17 years, 135 days	Newcastle Stadium, Newcastle, Australia	
8	Win	6–2	Len Baker	KO	1 (4)	Jun 12, 1943	17 years, 128 days	Newcastle Stadium, Newcastle, Australia	
7	Loss	5–2	Gunner Wilkinson	TKO	4 (4)	Nov 25, 1941	15 years, 294 days	Greater Newcastle Stadium, Newcastle, Australia	
6	Win	5–1	Cec Burr	KO	2 (4)	Sep 23, 1941	15 years, 231 days	Newcastle Stadium, Newcastle, Australia	
5	Win	4–1	Eddie Roebuck	PTS	4	Sep 20, 1941	15 years, 228 days	Greater Newcastle Stadium, Newcastle, Australia	
4	Loss	3–1	Eddie Roebuck	PTS	4	Sep 16, 1941	15 years, 224 days	Greater Newcastle Stadium, Newcastle, Australia	
3	Win	3–0	Eddie Roebuck	KO	4 (4)	Sep 13, 1941	15 years, 221 days	Greater Newcastle Stadium, Newcastle, Australia	
2	Win	2–0	Paddy Chapman	TKO	4 (4)	Aug 26, 1941	15 years, 203 days	Greater Newcastle Stadium, Newcastle, Australia	
1	Win	1–0	Leo Con Corrigan	KO	1 (4)	Aug 16, 1941	15 years, 193 days	Greater Newcastle Stadium, Newcastle, Australia	

== Titles ==
Preceded by Jack Johnson	Australian heavyweight Championship; 1950–52	Succeeded by Ken Brady
Preceded by Dick Turpin	Commonwealth (British Empire) Middleweight; 1949–52	Succeeded by Randolph Turpin
Preceded by Jack Johnson	Australian Light Heavyweight Championship; 1946–52	Succeeded by Carlo Marchini
Preceded by Jack Kirkham	Australian Middleweight Championship; 1946–52	Succeeded by Al Bourke

== Sources ==
Pictures held and digitised as part of the Arnold Thomas boxing collection by the National Library of Australia

- Dave Sands, Empire and Australian Middleweight Champion and Tom Maguire, trainer
- British Empire title bout, Dave Sands, 11 st. 5 lb., K.O. Dick Turpin, 11 st. 3¾ lb., in the first round at Harringay Arena, England, 6 September 1949
- Dave Sands (left), 11 st. 7¾ lb. v. Henry Brimm, 11 st. 5½ lb., at Rushcutter's Bay Stadium, 8 August 1950
