= Jerry Jerome =

Jerry Jerome may refer to:

- Jerry Jerome (boxer) (1874–1943), Australian boxer
- Jerry Jerome (saxophonist) (1912–2001), American musician

== See also ==
- Jerome Jerome, English writer
