= Félix Ocampo =

Filipino boxer

Personal information
- Nationality: Filipino
- Born: January 8, 1941 (age 85) Philippines
- Height: 5 ft 8 in (173 cm)
- Weight: 150 lb (70 kg)

Boxing career
- Weight class: Light middleweight

Félix C. Ocampo (born January 8, 1941) is a Filipino boxer. He competed in the men's light middleweight event at the 1964 Summer Olympics. At the 1964 Summer Olympics, he lost to Anthony Barber of Australia.
