= Otto Cribb =

New Zealand boxer

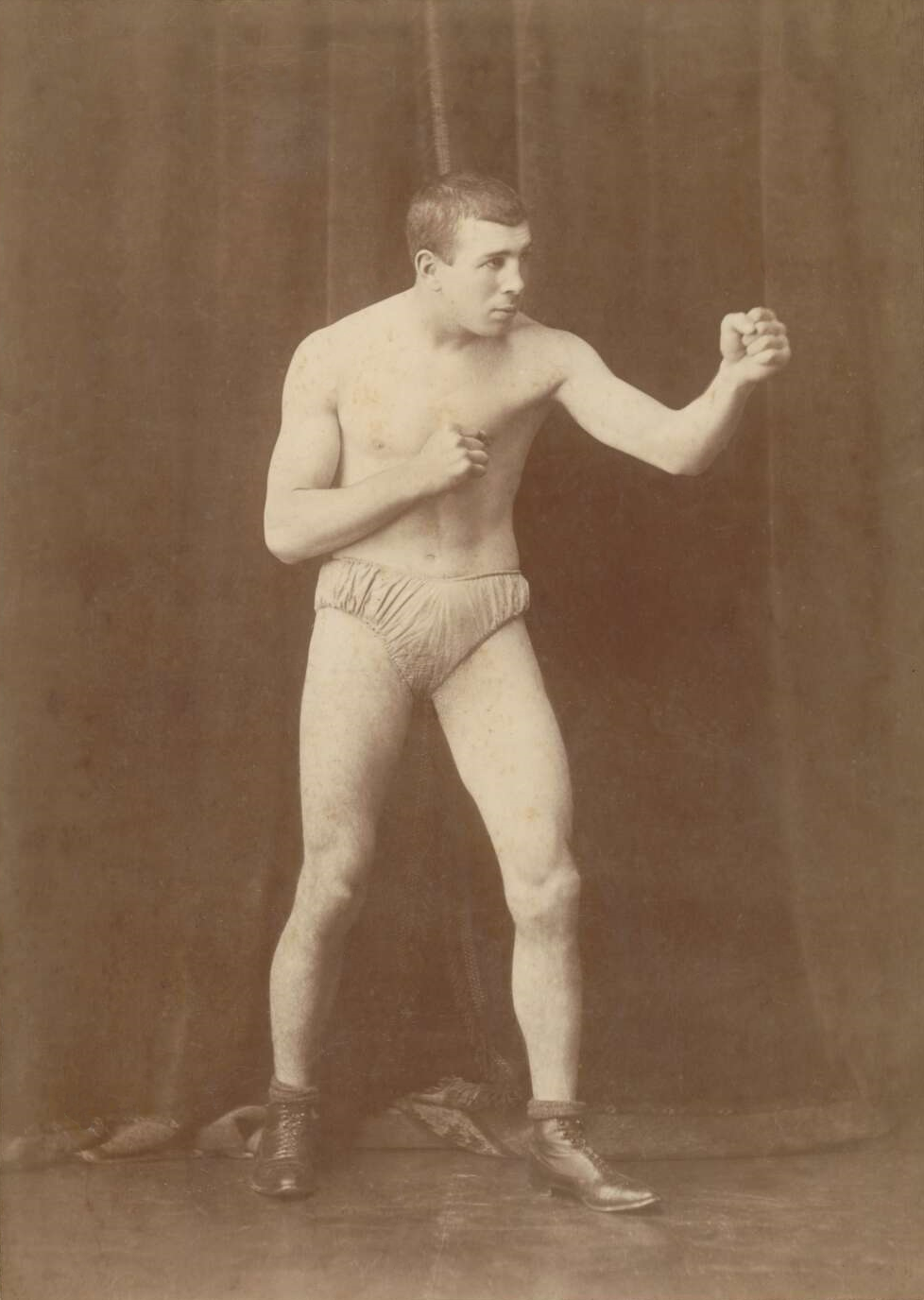

Personal information
- Nationality: New Zealand
- Born: 14 February 1878 Dunedin, New Zealand
- Died: 23 July 1901 (aged 23) Sydney, Australia
- Height: 5 ft 5.5 in (1.66 m)
- Weight: Middleweight

Boxing career
- Reach: 67 in (170 cm)

Boxing record
- Total fights: 27
- Wins: 18
- Win by KO: 15
- Losses: 2
- Draws: 2

Otto Cribb, born Alfred Otto Simpson, (14 February 1878 – 23 July 1901) was a New Zealand boxer notable for being inducted into the Australian National Boxing Hall of Fame as a pioneer of the sport in 2014. He only boxed for three years but became the most popular boxer in the colonies due to his grit and determination during his short career.

He began his boxing career in New Zealand but moved to Australia after a year where he achieved popularity and became the middleweight champion of Australia after beating Mick Dunn. He then went to America where he suffered his first defeat and returned to Australia, accusing his manager of taking advantage of him financially. Shortly after returning he suffered his second defeat in a rematch with Dunn and died shortly afterwards due to a concussion.

== Biography ==
=== Early years ===
Cribb was born in Dunedin, New Zealand, in 1878. His birth name was Alfred Simpson and his father was a tobacconist and hairdresser in Christchurch. He also became a tobacconist and worked for a chemist's shop in New Zealand for a time, and attained a high level of education.

Cribb began boxing in New Zealand in 1898, winning several fights that year, and came to Australia in about 1899, ultimately settling in Parramatta, and earned recognition in boxing circles by sparring in a novice tournament at the Alhambra Club in Sydney in May. He joined the novice competition officially, and in June 1899 fought fellow novice boxer Paddy Martin at the Alhambra Club and won. The fight was regarded as both entertaining and amusing by the crowd, with Otto drawing laughs for reacting to being punched in the nose by wiping it. In September he beat Joe Dunn in a semi-final of the novice competition, and in October he drew against a boxer going by the pseudonym 'The Poet'. In late October he contracted influenza and was bedridden for four days leading him to postpone a match against Jack Tuckwell, who he beat when the match finally took place in late November. In December he acted as a cornerman for the first time during a Colonial Fleet boxing championship.

=== Boxing stardom in Australia ===
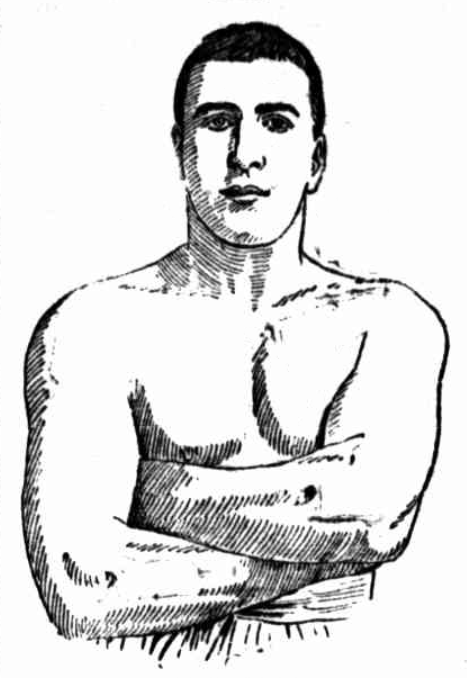
Otto Cribb, 1900.

In January 1900 Cribb beat Harry Dawson in five minutes in a fight at the Golden Gate Club attended by 800 spectators, who were disappointed at the noncompetitive fight. After the fight he expressed the wish to box in Melbourne, but in February he boxed in Sydney again against Ned Burden at the Golden Gate club, winning quickly in front of a crowd of 1,000. In March he fought Victorian light-weight Tot Higgins in Sydney, and won in thirteen rounds in what was described as his best performance yet in front of a crowd of 2,000. In April he beat Jack Broughton at the Gaiety Theatre in front of 500 people. The match was harshly criticized due to Broughton's lack of competitiveness, and it was suggested it may even kill the Sydney boxing boom.

In late April 1900 Cribb made up for the lacklustre match against Broughton by fighting Queenslander Snowy Sturgeon in front of 1,500 people, knocking Sturgeon out in what was described as one of the most exciting fights ever held in Sydney. In early May he briefly visited Melbourne and was present in boxing circles, stating that while he was in Melbourne for a holiday he would box if an opponent presented themselves. After returning to Sydney he fought a rematch against Snowy Sturgeon in front of a crowd which filled the Metropolitan Athletic Club Hall over capacity, with over 1,500 spectators filling the hall and crowding the doors. The majority of the crowd supported Cribb and he knocked Sturgeon down to win the fight in the eighth round.

Cribb was regarded as a star after the Sturgeon fights and was scheduled to face Victorian boxer Peter Murphy, but refused to fight in Melbourne while Murphy refused to fight in Sydney which prompted an offer from Brisbane to host the fight, which ultimately did not take place. Instead Cribb boxed Sturgeon a third time in July in Sydney and they attracted a crowd of 1,400. The fight was regarded as disappointing with neither boxer being aggressive and it went the full twenty rounds. The referee expressed that they felt Cribb had been superior, but before the fight it was agreed that going the distance meant the result was a draw. In early September he fought Tot Higgins again and won in four minutes, and later in the month he was scheduled to box Mick Dunn for the Australian middleweight championship. He fought Dunn in October to a capacity crowd of approximately 1,500 at the Gaiety Athletic Club and the fight was regarded as exciting with Dunn knocking Cribb's false teeth out of his mouth with a lefthanded punch, and Cribb knocking Dunn out in the eighth round to secure the championship.

=== Trip to America ===
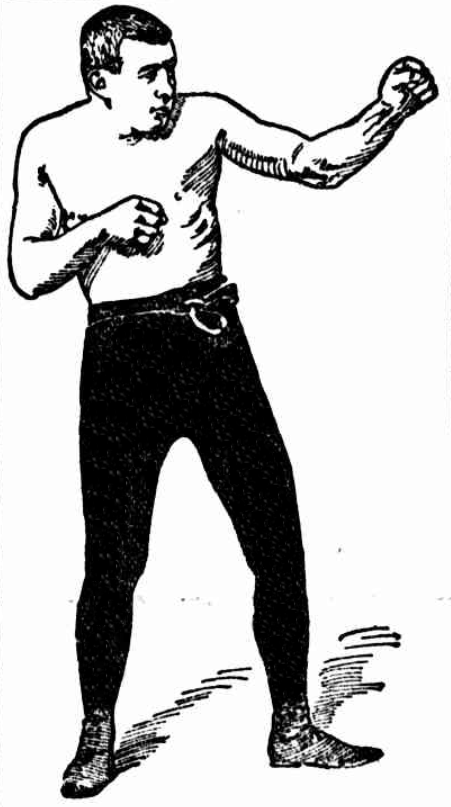
Otto Cribb, illustration from 1901.

In October 1900 Otto's brother Arthur made his boxing debut in Sydney but lost with critics saying he did not have his brother's fighting abilities beyond grit. Otto himself spent some of October in Melbourne and then embarked on a trip to America immediately after arriving back in Sydney, disappointing Mick Dunn who he had promised a rematch after his Melbourne trip. It was reported he intended to pursue a boxing career in the United States largely due to being frustrated by booking negotiations in Australia.

Cribb sailed to America on the Maripose and by December 1900 he had settled in San Francisco. He came under the wing of a boxing promoter named Mr. James and boxed in a trial against Soldier Green to impress him, earning a booking against Frank McConnell. The booking was regarded as somewhat controversial as Cribb was completely unknown in America and his undefeated record in Australia was not used to promote him to American boxing fans. Cribb beat McConnell in four rounds when the fight took place in January 1901, and was reportedly immediately well known in San Francisco as a result. In February he fought Charlie Thurston, the Flying Dutchman, and the match went the whole twenty rounds and ended in a draw.

Cribb's match with Thurston was positively received and a rematch was organized, with some haggling over the price, and Cribb employed a large team of trainers to assist him in preparing for the rematch, prompting Thurston to remark "I guess they can't get inside the ring and help Cribb, so I don't care if he has a dozen Australians training him." They fought to a crowd of 7,000 at the end of March, and Cribb was accused of fouling with low blows early in the match, which was ignored by the referee. He tired by the end of the match, but did manage a late comeback and avoided being knocked out. However, Thurston was awarded the win without controversy.

=== Return to Australia ===
In May 1901 Cribb embarked on a return voyage for Australia due to feeling homesick, and he arrived in Sydney on the R.M.S. Sierra in June. When asked about America upon his arrival he remarked "America is all right, but no more Americans for me; I'll tell you all some other time." In an interview after settling in, he said his contract had severely limited his opportunities and he felt his manager had taken advantage of him financially and had threatened to prevent him from returning to Australia when he expressed dissatisfaction. He also reported that when he attended a fight as a spectator someone pulled a knife on him causing him to pull a gun on them, which resulted in him being assaulted by several people at the next match prompting him to run away. He expressed his desire to box again after settling in and announced he would honor his promise and give Mick Dunn a rematch as his first fight. Dunn was eager to have his rematch and approached Cribb to organize it immediately after hearing of his return.

In early June 1901 Cribb sparred with Donny Maloney. He gave another interview in early June in which expressed his desire to fight everybody in his weight class before going on a business trip to New Zealand in September, which prompted Dunn to question if this meant Cribb intended to renege on their rematch again, however he was reassured when the rematch was confirmed shortly afterwards. In July a rematch with Snowy Sturgeon was organized to take place after the Dunn rematch, and New Zealand boxer Jerry Butler challenged Cribb to a match.

=== Death ===
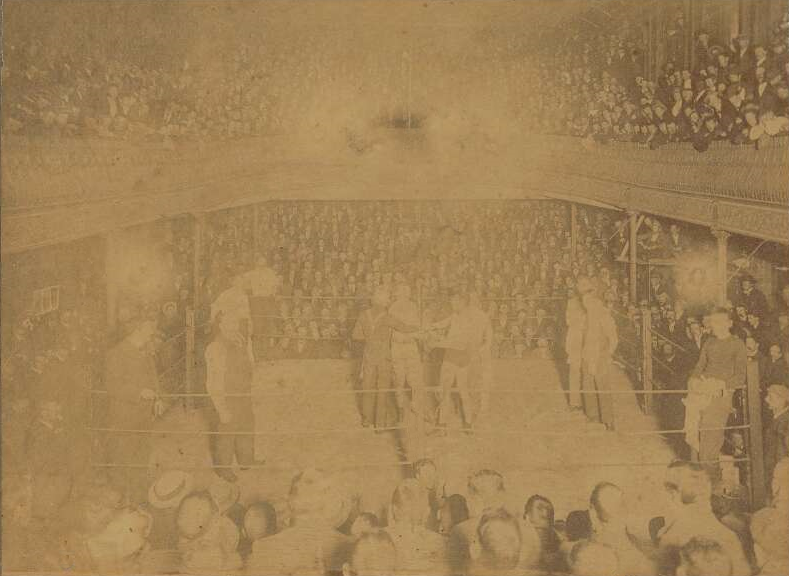
Otto Cribb v Mick Dunn at the Gaiety Hall, Sydney, July 1901

Cribb faced Dunn on 22 July 1901 and suffered a violent defeat with Dunn knocking him out in the ninth round with a blow to the forehead and an uppercut to the jaw. Cribb appeared fine after the fight other than a cut to the cheek and shook hands with Dunn, however he died in his sleep on 23 July 1901. His trainer had advised him against continuing with the fight as shortly beforehand he had complained of severe back pain which made it difficult for him to sit, however he refused to postpone the fight or wear a plaster brace for fear of disappointing the public.

Dunn noted he had no ill feelings against Cribb, did not have any desire to hurt him, had intended for the fight to be his last, and had only not retired after their previous bout as he felt he performed poorly in it. Cribb's funeral was held on July 25 and attended by many members of the public. He was laid to rest in the Jewish section of a cemetery in Rookwood.

It was determined the cause of death was a hemorrhage on the surface of the brain due to a concussion, and Mick Dunn, the referee, the timekeeper, Cribb's trainer, and one of his cornermen were all arrested and charged on suspicion of having been involved with his death. While concussion was the cause of death some injuries to internal organs were also discovered. The arrests drew criticism from some who felt there was no place for police involvement in an athletic contest. On 26 July 1901 the death was officially ruled accidental by an inquest.
