= Stanley Wilson =

Stanley Wilson may refer to:

== Politics ==
- Stanley Wilson (British politician) (1868–1938)
- Stanley B. Wilson (1869-1937), American labor leader and politician
- Stanley C. Wilson (1879–1967), American politician

== Sports ==
- Stanley Wilson (running back) (born 1961), American football running back
- Stanley Wilson Jr. (1982–2023), American football cornerback
- Stanley Wilson (cricketer) (1948–2022), Australian cricketer
- Stanley Wilson (athlete), English javelin thrower
- Stanley Wilson (footballer) (born 2006), Kenyan footballer

== Others ==
- Stanley Wilson (composer) (1917–1970), American musician and composer
- Stanley Herbert Wilson (1899–1953), British composer
- G. Stanley Wilson (1879–1958), American architect and builder

== See also ==
- Stan Wilson (disambiguation)
