= Anthony Barber (disambiguation) =

Anthony Barber (1920–2005) was a British politician.

Anthony Barber may also refer to:

- Cat Barber (Anthony Ynique Barber, born 1994), American professional basketball player
- Anthony Barber (boxer) (1939–2004), Australian boxer

== See also ==
- Tony Barber (disambiguation)
