= Ambrose Palmer =

Australian boxer and rules footballer

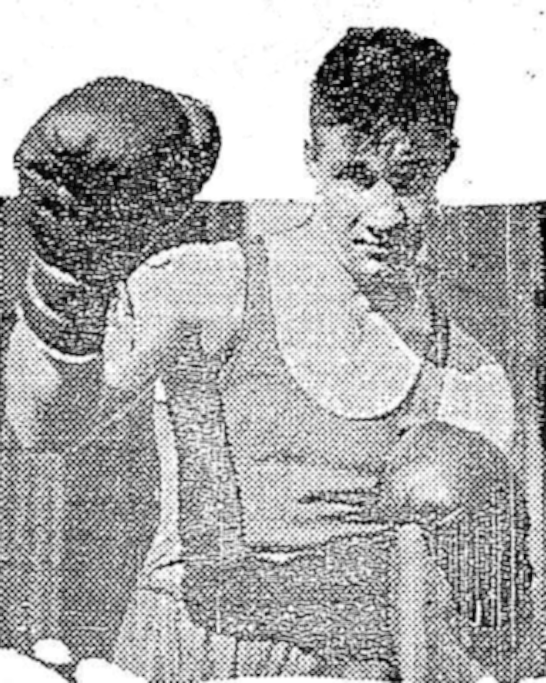

Personal information
- Full name: Ambrose Harold Palmer
- Born: 16 October 1910; Footscray, Victoria
- Died: 16 October 1990 (aged 80); Yarraville, Victoria
- Original team: Riverside
- Height: 178 cm (5 ft 10 in)
- Weight: 82 kg (181 lb)

Playing career^{1}
Years	Club	Games (Goals)
1933–1943	Footscray	83 (44)
- ^{1} Playing statistics correct to the end of 1943.

Ambrose Harold Palmer (16 October 1910 – 16 October 1990) was a talented world-class professional prize fighter and a leading Australian rules footballer of the 1930s and early 1940s.

== Family ==
The third child of the Victorian champion lightweight boxer William Arthur Palmer (1877-1940), and May Palmer (1885-1936), née Ranger, Ambrose Harold Palmer was born at Footscray, Victoria on 16 October 1910.

He married Emma May Gibson (1914-1993), at Footscray, on 12 September 1931.

== Boxing ==
=== Boxer ===
Often referred to as "Young" Palmer — his father and his two elder brothers, David William "Dave" Palmer (1905-1966) and William Vincent "Billy" Palmer (1907-1947) were also noted boxers — he was a champion amateur boxer, who tuned professional, winning 57 of his professional bouts (losing only 7) from 1929 to 1938. Eventually managed by Hugh D. McIntosh, in the 1930s he held the Australian middleweight, light heavyweight and heavyweight boxing titles at the same time.

=== Trainer ===
He later became a renowned boxing trainer, notably for Jack Johnson, world champion Johnny Famechon, Len Dittmar and Paul Ferreri

=== 1956 Olympic Games ===
In 1956 he was the official coach for the Australian boxing team at the 1956 Melbourne Olympics.

== Football ==
Palmer made his debut in the back-pocket for Victorian Football League (VFL) club Footscray in the match against South Melbourne on 6 May 1933. He went on to play 83 matches for Footscray, retiring in 1943.

=== 1939 ===
In Round One of the 1939 VFL season, Footscray were playing Essendon Football Club and Palmer, resting in the forward-pocket, collided head-on with Essendon backman Stan Wilson, suffering sixteen jaw, cheekbone and skull fractures (he had been knocked out in a collision with Bill Shaw in the team's last pre-season practice match a week earlier). For a while the injuries were thought to be life-threatening, but Palmer eventually recovered, and although he did not play again that season, he went on to play another forty-four games for Footscray.

== Military service ==
Palmer enlisted in the Second AIF in December 1941, but was declared medically unfit for duty and was discharged from the army in February 1942 because of "post-traumatic headache' ".

== Death ==
He died at Yarraville, Victoria on 16 October 1990.

== Recognition ==
=== Member of the Order of the British Empire (1971) ===
He was appointed Member of the Order of the British Empire (MBE) "for services to sport" in June 1971.

=== Sport Australia Hall of Fame (1989) ===
He was inducted into the Sport Australia Hall of Fame in 1989.

=== Australian National Boxing Hall of Fame (2003) ===
He was inducted into the Australian National Boxing Hall of Fame in 2003.
