= Neville Williams =

Australian boxer and activist

- Known for: Boxing, opposition to Lake Cowal gold mine
- Boxing career
- Nickname: Chappy
- Weight: lightweight
- Stance: Orthodox

Boxing record
- Total fights: 34
- Wins: 16
- Win by KO: 5
- Losses: 18
- Draws: 0

Neville "Chappy" Williams is an elder of the Wiradjuri nation, in Western New South Wales, and a former professional boxer. Known as "Uncle Chappy" to those who follow Indigenous Australian customs, he is a regular at the Aboriginal Tent Embassy in Canberra and a key opponent of the Barrick Gold Corporation's gold mine project at Lake Cowal. Barrick sold the Cowal Mine to Evolution Mining in 2015.

William's most prominent victory as a professional boxer came on 7 June 1972 in Sydney's Riverwood Legion Club when he knocked out popular boxer, fellow Australian Wally Carr in the third round. In his previous fight, Williams had fought for the Australian national Featherweight title but lost by first-round knockout to champion Lucky Gattellari at the Apia Club in Sydney on 18 April 1972.

== See also ==
- Lists of Indigenous Australians
