= Mick Dunn (boxer) =

Australian boxer (1864–1950)

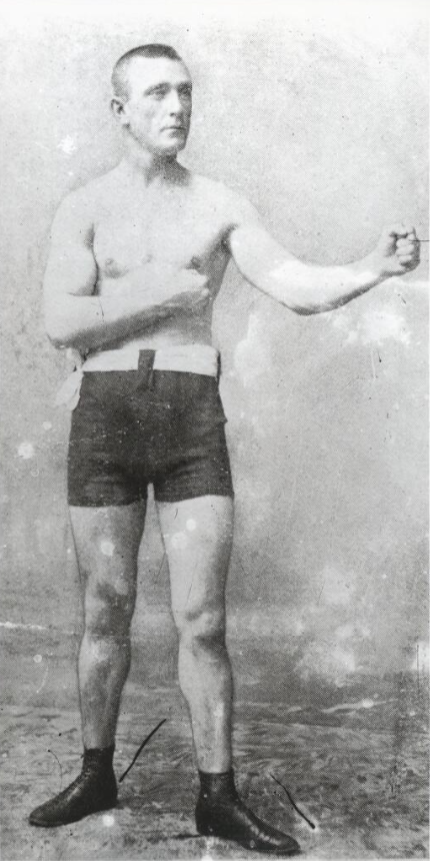

Personal information
- Born: 20 October 1864 Sydney, Australia
- Died: 26 July 1950 (aged 85) Sydney, Australia
- Height: 5 ft 7 in (1.70 m)
- Weight: Middleweight

Boxing career
- Reach: 70 in (178 cm)

Boxing record
- Total fights: 24
- Wins: 11
- Win by KO: 9
- Losses: 6
- Draws: 2

Mick Dunn (20 October 1864 - 26 July 1950) was an Australian professional boxer who competed from 1890 to 1903 and held the Australian middleweight title twice between 1900 and 1901.

Dunn began boxing in Sydney at the age of fifteen and became a well-known figure in the cities boxing community in his youth, making his professional debut in 1890. In 1893 he traveled to America with a group of Australian boxers and fought matches in the United States and in England before returning to Australia. In 1897 he moved to South Africa briefly fighting one match before returning to Australia.

In 1899 Dunn was billed as the middleweight champion of New South Wales in a match against Jack Conlon who was billed as the middleweight champion of Victoria and after winning he was declared the middleweight champion of Australia. He then lost the title to Otto Cribb in 1900 and won a rematch in 1901 during which he injured his hand. Cribb died in his sleep after the rematch and Dunn was briefly arrested but acquitted of a manslaughter charge. He then retired from boxing due to his hand injury.

In his retirement Dunn became a boxing coach, hosted boxing events, and became a co-owner of the Golden Gate Athletic Hall in Sydney. He briefly came out of retirement in 1903 fighting twice in draws then returned to coaching and serving as a timekeeper and referee for boxing matches into the 1910s.

== Biography ==
=== Early career ===
Dunn was born in Sydney in 1864 and began boxing at the age of fifteen. By 1890 he had become well-known, and in March that year he made his professional debut boxing Dick Sandall at Foley's Athletic Hall in Sydney. He led early in the fight but was knocked out by Sandall in the sixth round, with reports noting he seemed inexperienced at boxing and also out of shape. In June Dunn stated he was eager to fight again, and he sparred with amateurs in four round exhibitions on two boxing programs late in the month. One of these spars was noted as being more spirited than a typical exhibition, exciting the crowd significantly. As of July Dunn was often boxing four round spars to trial applicants who wished to join the Sydney Athletic Club, with a notable boxer he trialed being Edward 'Starlight' Rollins. He had also become an instructor at the club as of July. In September he returned to the ring to box Billy Williams at the Sydney Amateur Gymnastic Club and suffered a second loss, being battered by Williams throughout the fight while struggling to put power into his hits before being knocked unconscious in the fourth round.

In early 1891 Dunn continued fighting four round exhibitions, served as a cornerman for other boxers during fights, and continued boxing for club trials. In late March he had his first win when he boxed Pablo Fanque and beat him in the first round with many hits to the face. In May his younger brother, Joe, began sparring at the Golden Gate Athletic Club. In August Dunn boxed Jack Perry in Orange and dominated by winning in about half a round, although one critics review of the fight attributed the win to Perry's incompetence describing Dunn as a "third rater". In October 1891 he was accused of being used as hired muscle by the overseer of Toorale Station to rough up workers, but he denied the accusation which was retracted. In November Dunn fought Pat O'Toole in a full match knocking him down in the ninth round after which O'Toole resigned.

In early 1892 Dunn boxed some four round spars with Joe Pablo on the card of full fights. In late February Dunn was booked to box Herbert Sinnott of Victoria, but Sinnott did not show for the fight, and was accused of only challenging Dunn in order to gain media attention. They met a few days after the fight was supposed to have happened and rescheduled. Coverage ahead of the fight noted that Dunn was the favorite, but it was also suggested that his skills were on the decline and that he had never shown his full potential in the ring. They finally fought at the end of March in front of a crowd of 500 at the California Athletic Club and Sinnott collapsed in the tenth round for no apparent reason and was counted out, which he explained as being due to a hit paralyzing his arm while Dunn suggested that a hit to the body had hurt him. In August 1892 Dunn visited Queensland with some other boxers and they fought exhibition matches in Rockhampton with Dunn being described as the most active boxer to have visited the city. By late September he had returned to Sydney and in an interview described his trip as "splendid", although he did not enjoy travelling by horseback which was required in parts of Queensland.

In October 1892 Dunn fought a four-round spar on the card of a fight between Dan Creedon and Jim Ryan and challenged the winner of the headline fight, and he was booked to fight the winner, Creedon, later in the month. Creedon was described as the best middleweight in Australia ahead of the fight and the harder hitter, and a report shortly before the match was to take place described it as being for the middle-weight championship for Australia, with Creedon being the best middle-weight in Victoria and Dunn being the best middle-weight in New South Wales, arguing the title had never been clearly defined prior. The fight took place at Darlinghurst Hall and Creedon was seven pounds heavier than Dunn at the weigh-in and over the middleweight limit. Dunn wanted to cancel the fight, however Creedon convinced him to proceed for the sake of the spectators by admitting he was at fault and negotiating to half the gate takings between them rather than the winner taking seventy-five percent. Dunn was knocked down in the second round for ten seconds and although he wanted to fight on his seconds forced him to concede by taking his gloves from him. In December a benefit night of boxing was held for Dunn at the Golden Gate club.

=== Boxing abroad ===
In March 1893 Dunn sailed to America on the Mariposa along with fellow Australian boxers, Jim Burge and Hughie Napier, hoping to advance their careers in the United States. A report suggested he would struggle to find opponents unless he lost a few pounds. As of May it was reported he had settled in America but had been unable to begin boxing, but in June he secured a match against Frank Purcell at a new club in Reno, Nevada. A report suggested if he lost to Purcell he should return to Australia, although when they fought in July Dunn won easily.

In February 1894 it was reported that the arrival of Dunn and his fellow Australians on the American boxing scene had caused a stir, and that month Dunn, Burge, and Napier, sailed to England and stayed in London where they met with the manager of the National Sporting Club hoping to be able to fight during their visit. Dunn sparred with Jack Welland of Hackney for about six rounds at the Kennington Social Club in England, with one report stating he gave a poor showing, as he lost on points in six rounds. By May Burge and Napier had returned to Australia but Dunn was still in London, but as of July Dunn had returned to America where that month he refused a match against Dick O'Brien which would have taken place in Providence.

By August 1894 Dunn was working as a trainer for the Australian boxer Young Griffo and seconded him in matches throughout September and into October. He sparred with Griffo for six rounds ahead of a match between Griffo and Stanton Abbott in New Orleans in September which was described as being better than the actual fight itself. In November Dunn boxed on the same card as Griffo beating Jim Butler, with a report on the match commenting that Butler "never should have put on boxing gloves." He continued to box into 1895 and in June he was defeated by Barbados boxer Joe Walcott in eight rounds, with a report suggesting that police interference had been the only thing preventing Dunn from being knocked out.

=== Return to Australia ===
In October 1895 Dunn arrived back in Australia having returned via London and was placed under quarantine. A report soon after his arrival noted his time abroad had not advanced his career and he had found it difficult to secure matches and noted he had been cut adrift by Griffo before returning, with Dunn describing him as an "erratic and ungrateful feather." Early in November Bill Jennings challenged him to a fight, and he gave an extensive interview on his time abroad later in the month. In late November he was attacked by a mob with one person attempting to bite his nose off as he was accused of causing an injury, however a media report expressed doubt he was at fault and described him as "extremely well-behaved" and a "most inoffensive fellow". In December Bill Jennings and newcomer to boxing Tom Meadham expressed a desire to box Dunn, but he did not feel there was any reason to be active in the boxing business at the time.

In February 1896 Bill Jennings trainer visited Sydney to try and book a match with Dunn, as Jennings was considered middleweight champion of Victoria and felt defeating Dunn would render him middleweight champion of Australia, however a match was not booked and in March Dunn moved to Coolgardie in order to box in Western Australia, and shortly after arriving it was suggested he could fight a trained boxing kangaroo which was in the town. He was to box Harry Duggan in Western Australia however the booking fell through as Duggan pulled out at the last minute, so Dunn participated in a boxing exhibition in a tent with some other boxers which did not make much money and left Perth in May. Later in May he sent a letter to someone he knew in New York requesting transportation expenses to move back to the U.S. as a new boxing arena had been built in New York City, and it was also rumored he was going to move to Derry in Ireland to train for the Derry football team, but at the end of the month he announced he was willing to box anyone in Coolgardie and re-entered the ring, sparring on a Coolgardie Boxing Carnival program in June. Also in June he began playing for the Londonderry Football team which was a Western Australian-based side, not the Irish side as rumored, and trained Western Australian based boxer Pat O'Toole.

As of July 1896 Dunn was advertising his services as a boxing instructor in Coolgardie, and he continued fighting four round exhibition spars on cards into August. He fought a full six round contest against Mick McInerney in October and was described as thoroughly outclassing McInerney in a "tame affair." In November Dunn returned to Sydney and after arriving gave an interview in which he criticized the way the boxing business was run in Coolgardie although he did say police opposition to the sport was not as bad as rumored. In the interview he also mentioned he was planning on moving to Africa.

=== Sojourn in South Africa and Training Boxers ===
On 1 January 1897, Dunn sailed for South Africa on the Australasian hoping to make money fighting middle-weights in Johannesburg. By April he had settled in Johannesburg and a report described him as a "quiet inoffensive man" who was "much liked". In August he was finally scheduled to fight Bill Edwards who was the favorite ahead of the match. Edwards won, although a report noted he did not draw blood or knock skin off of Dunn. In October Dunn arrived back in Sydney from South Africa.

As of March 1898 Dunn had rented a room on Truth Lane off King Street in Sydney where he began training boxers and hosting free sparring contests, and by July he had a large number of students. By October Dunn had moved to rooms at Bank Court, and one of his exhibitions held that month had a good crowd in attendance and Dunn himself fought a short bout. On New Year's Eve 1898 an exhibition at Dunn's rooms had good attendance despite competing with several other events.

In March 1899 Mick Nathan, a Victorian boxer, challenged Dunn to a match but Dunn felt the amount offered was too low. In June it was rumored that Dunn would fight Jack Conlon, and it was booked towards the end of the month and billed as being for the Middleweight Championship of New South Wales. They finally fought in August however the police interrupted the program and it was cancelled, with both fighters having to appear in Court, and as Dunn and Conlon had personally funded the advertising and hiring of the hall a benefit program to reimburse them was organized.

=== Middle-weight championship ===
In October 1899 the match between Conlon and Dunn was reorganized, and Dunn won the match easily, with a report noting Conlon seemed to be undertrained. The match was billed as being for the middle-weight championship of New South Wales resulting in Dunn being announced as the Middle-Weight champion of the state after winning.

Dunn continued training boxers after becoming champion. He next aimed to return to the ring to defend the middle-weight championship of New South Wales in February 1900 with arrangements being made for a match between him and Tim Murphy, however the match was cancelled when Murphy moved to the United States later in the month. In late February he sparred on the program of a benefit for Hughie Napier. In April 1900 Dunn arranged a match against Melbourne boxer Fred Preston however on the night of the match both boxers refused to enter the ring as they felt the attendance was too small resulting in the venue banning both of them from ever having a match at it again.

In July 1900 Dunn traveled to Melbourne to box Fred Preston, and the fight was billed as being between Dunn as the New South Wales middle-weight champion and Preston as the Victorian champion. Dunn beat Preston easily with reports describing the match as disappointing due to Preston not challenging him.

In September 1900 Dunn met with Otto Cribb to organize a match, and later in the month a match was announced which was billed as being for the Australian middleweight championship. Dunn and Cribb fought in October to a crowd estimated to be 1,500 strong and the fight was reported as being exciting with Dunn knocking Cribb's false teeth out of his mouth with a lefthanded punch, and Cribb knocking Dunn out in the eighth round to secure the championship.

After the loss Cribb agreed to fight a rematch against Dunn however later in October Cribb left the country to pursue boxing in the United States leaving Dunn disappointed. Dunn did not pursue a return to the ring until mid 1901 when Cribb returned to Australia immediately approaching him to organize the re-match after hearing of his arrival. They boxed on 22 July 1901, and Dunn knocked Cribb out in the ninth round with a blow to the forehead and an uppercut to the jaw and the shook hands after the fight. Dunn sustained a serious hand injury during the fight, and Cribb died in his sleep on 23 July 1901.

After Cribb's death Dunn was interviewed by the press and expressed that he did not have any ill feelings towards Cribb, had not intended to hurt him, and that he had intended to retire after their first match only remaining active in order to have a rematch with Cribb. The same month as Cribb's death Dunn was arrested alongside the referee and timekeeper of the match as well as Cribb's trainer and charged with being responsible for Cribbs death, shortly after it was determined that Cribb had died due to a hemorrhage on the surface of the brain caused by a concussion and had also suffered internal injuries. The arrests were criticized in the media, and Cribb's death was officially ruled an accident on 26 July 1901. In August a benefit was organized to raise funds to pay for the legal defense of Dunn and the other officials which raised 50 pounds. Dunn and the others were acquitted of a charge of manslaughter in October 1901. A report of the hearing noted that the prosecution legal team did not seem to have any enthusiasm in presenting its evidence.

Shortly after Dunn's acquittal Snowy Sturgeon challenged him to box for the middleweight title and Dunn noted that his hand was still seriously injured but that once it had healed he would box Sturgeon, later announcing that it would be his last ever match if he lost. In December 1901 he announced his retirement from boxing without fighting Sturgeon due to his hand remaining severely injured and he stated he was going to continue coaching boxers.

=== First retirement and return ===
After retiring Dunn coached from rooms he had on King Street in Sydney. He was rendered bed ridden by a flu in September 1902. Later in the year he briefly visited the United States where he helped train Dan Creedon for a match he fought in New Orleans. In 1903 he begin fighting in sparring sessions which became well attended by spectators, and began chairing regular boxing programmes at the Golden Gate Athletic Hall. As of July 1903, he had become a co-owner of the Golden Gate Athletic Hall.

In August 1903 Dunn came out of retirement with a six-round match between him and Jim Scanlan being arranged at the Golden Gate Hall. The boxing style in the match was described as scientific and it was declared a draw. He fought another six-round match against George Johns in September which was described as an "fine exhibition of boxing skill" with the crowd applauding after each round. The match was also ruled a draw which reportedly resulted in the crowd being amused.

Dunn arranged another match in October 1903 against Billy McCall, however McCall did not show on the night due to last minute business commitments. Dunn announced to the crowd at the fight that he would box anyone and ended up fighting an exhibition against Jim Barron.

=== Retirement ===
In November 1903 Dunn began serving as a timekeeper for matches at the Golden Gate Hall, and as of December he was also serving as a referee for matches. He continued serving as a referee until at least 1919.

Dunn continued to coach well after his retirement and was highly respected with a media report recommending boxers train under him due to his "scientific" knowledge of the sport in 1929.

As of 1945 Dunn was living in northern Sydney and was in poor health, rarely leaving his home. He died in Sydney in 1950 at the age of eighty-five.
