= Ron Richards (boxer) =

Australian boxer

Personal information
- Nationality: Australian
- Born: Ranold/Randell William Richards; 8 May 1910 Ipswich, Queensland
- Died: 14 January 1967 (aged 56) Sydney
- Height: 5 ft 10 1/2 in (1.79 m)
- Weight: middle/light heavyweight

Boxing career
- Reach: 72 1/2 in (184 cm)
- Stance: Orthodox

Boxing record
- Total fights: 131
- Wins: 95 (KO 57)
- Losses: 25 (KO 7)
- Draws: 10

Ron Richards (born Ranold;/Randell William Richards; 8 May 1910 – 14 January 1967, in Ipswich, Queensland) was an Indigenous Australian professional middle/light heavyweight boxer of the 1930s and 1940s who is considered one of the greatest fighters ever to come from Australia. He won many championship titles in Australia and fought 146 professional fights. He was seen as a serious contender for the world middle and light heavyweight championships.

== Life and career ==
Richards studied at the local state school for Aboriginal children and worked cutting timber with his father at age 14. His family was exempt from the Aboriginal Protection Act (1897) and so were able to move around the Boonah district. They worked part of this time as share-croppers. His brother Maxie was also a very successful bantam-weight boxer.

Richards started his career boxing in travelling shows like many other Aboriginal boxers, including his father who was a bareknuckle boxer. He then moved on to stadium fights, and took on Australian championships. He also fought internationally against prominent American and English fighters. His earnings allowed him to buy four houses. He married Dorothy Elizabeth Iselin in St Luke's Church of England, Brisbane, on 14 December 1935. He later re-married to Colleen Boyle, an Irish immigrant.

He intentionally fought harder than he was told to at times, winning fights that organisers had told him to lose, and was often matched against fighters in higher weight categories. His reputation was also marred by gambling, including the 'ring-in' known as the 'bowser boy affair' in 1936.

He was also considered a contender for the world middle and light heavyweight championships for his wins including his defeat of 34 out of 50 bouts against overseas celebrity boxers.

== Post-career ==
The death of his wife, Dorothy, in 1937 from tuberculosis had severely affected him. At the end of his career, he fought in Sydney pubs against any who would challenge him. He eventually used up all his earnings and the native affairs branch of the Queensland government was requested to take jurisdiction over him after police in Sydney charged him with vagrancy in May 1947. He was subsequently incarcerated at the Woorabinda Aboriginal settlement and was released after three years.

He briefly lived in Brisbane, and then Sydney. While in Sydney he was arrested for 'vagrancy and drunkenness' and, under the 'Queensland Act', was sent to the Aboriginal reserve on Palm Island, Queensland, where he tended gardens and refused to talk about his boxing career. He also worked as a carpenter's labourer and managed a single men's home. At some point, he returned to Sydney after his daughter sent word of his estranged wife falling ill.

He died of a heart condition in Dulwich Hill in 1967. He was buried at Rookwood cemetery. He had a Catholic funeral which drew a great crowd, with many Australian boxing celebrities attending. He was survived by his daughter.

== Legacy ==
Richards was inducted into the Australian National Boxing Hall of Fame in 2003.

== Professional boxing record ==
Richards' professional fighting weight varied from 151 lb (68 kg; 10 st 11 lb), i.e. middleweight to 168 lb (76 kg; 12 st 0 lb), i.e. light heavyweight. His record includes:

- Queensland State heavyweight champion
- Queensland State middleweight champion
- Australian middleweight champion: 1933 and 1936-1942
- Australian lightweight champion: 1936-1938 and 1941
- Australian heavyweight champion
- Australian light heavyweight champion
- British Empire middleweight champion
