= Lou Cafaro =

Australian boxer (born 1962)

Personal information
- Nationality: Australian
- Born: Luciano Cafaro; 5 February 1962 (age 64)
- Weight: welter/light middle/middle/super middle/light heavy/cruiserweight

Boxing career
- Stance: Orthodox

Boxing record
- Total fights: 26
- Wins: 18 (KO 16)
- Losses: 8 (KO 7)

Luciano Cafaro (born 5 February 1962), known as Lou Cafaro, is an Australian professional welter/light middle/middle/super middle/light heavy/cruiserweight boxer of the 1980s and '90s who won the Australian middleweight title, Australian super middleweight title, Oriental and Pacific Boxing Federation (OPBF) super middleweight title, and Commonwealth super middleweight title, and was a challenger for the World Boxing Council (WBC) International super middleweight title against Kid Milo, his professional fighting weight varied from 156 1/2 lb (71.0 kg; 11 st 2.5 lb), i.e. welterweight to 175 1/4 lb (79.5 kg; 12 st 7.3 lb), i.e. cruiserweight.
