= Al Bourke =

Australian boxer (born 1928)

Personal information
- Nationality: Australian
- Born: Alan Stamford; 17 March 1928 (age 98) Hobart, Tasmania
- Height: 6 ft 2 in (1.88 m)
- Weight: middle/light heavyweight

Boxing career
- Reach: 74 in (188 cm)
- Stance: Orthodox

Boxing record
- Total fights: 44
- Wins: 39 (KO 11)
- Losses: 4 (KO 2)
- Draws: 1

Al Bourke (born Alan Stamford; 17 March 1928) is an Australian professional boxer of the 1940s and 1950s who won the Victorian middleweight title, Australian middleweight title, and British Empire middleweight title, his professional fighting weight varied from 152 lb (69 kg; 10 st 12 lb), i.e. middleweight to 174 lb (79 kg; 12 st 6 lb), i.e. light heavyweight. Al Bourke was trained by Jack Carroll, and then Ambrose Palmer.
