= Tony Barber (disambiguation) =

Tony Barber (born 1940) is an English born Australian game show host, radio announcer and television personality.

Tony Barber may also refer to:

- Tony Barber (bassist) (born 1963), British bassist with Buzzcocks
- Tony Barber (musician) (born 1942), Anglo-Australian, Billy Thorpe & the Aztecs

== See also ==
- Anthony Barber (disambiguation)
