= Gaele Sobott =

Australian writer

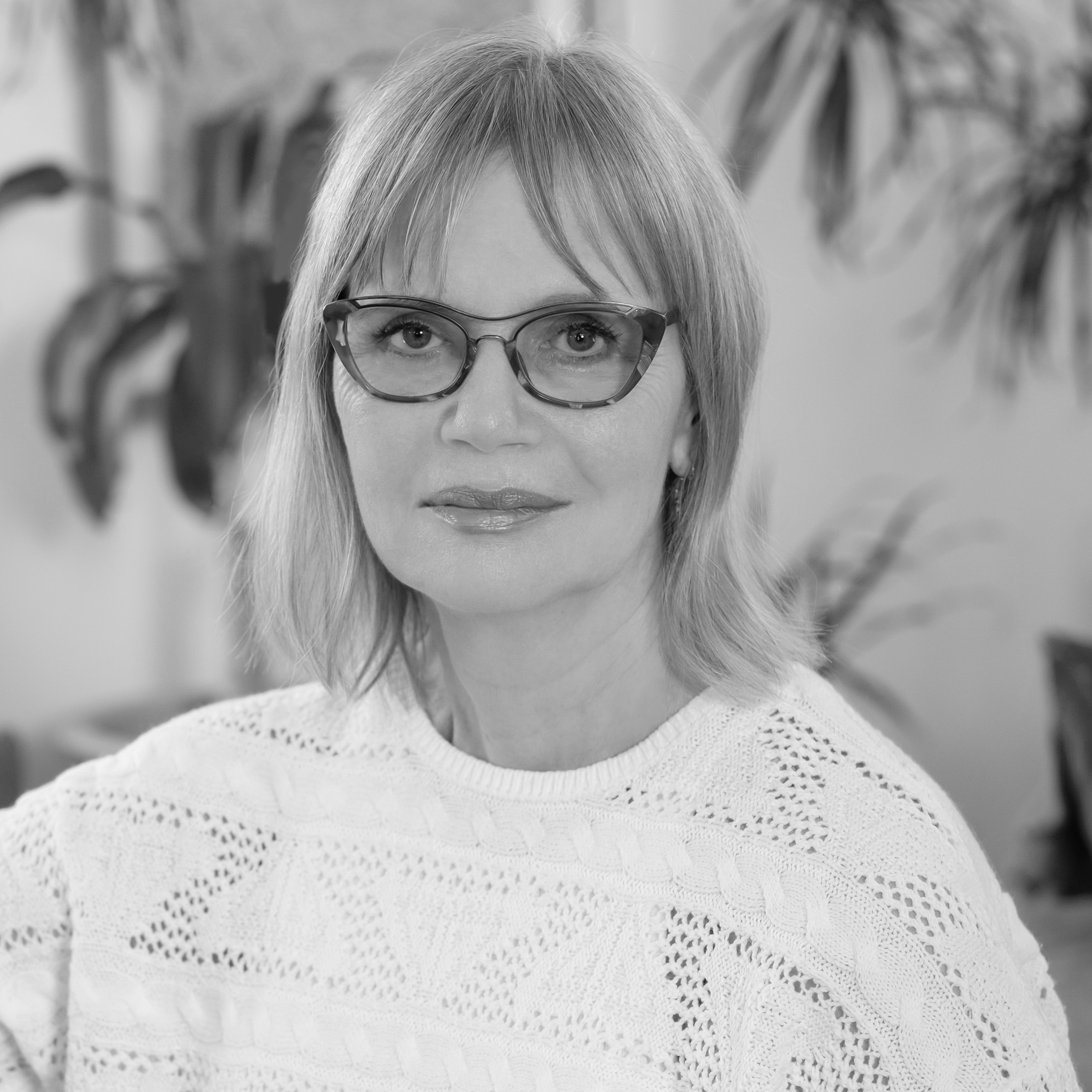
- Born: 1956 (age 68–69) Yallourn, Australia
- Occupation: Writer, poet, short-film maker
- Education: PhD on South African women writers
- Alma mater: University of Hull
- Notable works: My Longest Round: the life story of Wally Carr (2019)

Website
- gaelesobott.com

Gaele Sobott (born 1956), also known as Gaele Sobott-Mogwe, is an Australian short-film maker and author of poetry, short stories, non-fiction and children's books.

== Life ==
Gaele Sobott was born in 1956 in Yallourn, Victoria, Australia. Her parents were working class members of the Eureka Youth League, and life-long trade unionists.

In 1978, after working for a year in Athens, Greece, she moved to Botswana and lived there for the larger part of her life.

Gaele did her undergraduate degree, majoring in English and History, at the University of Botswana. She completed her PhD, a bio-bibliographical study of Twentieth Century Black South African women writers, at the University of Hull, England.

She is a disability activist and is the founding director of Outlandish Arts, a disabled-led arts organisation.

She currently lives in Sydney, Australia.

== Career ==
Gaele’s first short stories were published by the South African anti-Apartheid literary and cultural magazine, Staffrider, and her first children’s book was published by Baobab Press, Zimbabwe. Her children's book Thara Meets the Cassipoohka Man received the Zimbabwe Award for Children's Literature.

Heinemann African Writers Series published her first collection of short stories, Colour Me Blue, which blends fantasy and reality, melding African history and tradition with the grittiness of everyday life in Botswana. The stories capture the oppression of men and women, the tenderness of human affection and the powerful rhythm of African myth.

Gaele worked with Australian First Nations boxer, Wally "Wait-a-While" Carr to write a vivid account of his life in the literary biography My Longest Round, published by Magabala Books. Wally Carr held 12 titles in six divisions and fought an astonishing 101 professional bouts in his 15-year boxing career.

Gaele was the editor of Young Days: Bankstown Aboriginal Elders Oral History Project, published in 2013.

Gaele's short stories and poems appear in various literary magazines and anthologies, such as the Anchor Book of Modern African Stories, Botswana Women Write and Not Quite Right For Us. Her more recent essays, short stories and poems appear in literary magazines including, Rabbit Poetry, The Massachusetts Review, Sydney Review of Books, Meanjin, The Suburban Review, Plumwood Mountain, Cordite Poetry Review, New Flash Fiction Review, New Contrast, Disability Arts Online, Australian Women Writers Challenge, Wasafiri, Otway Journal and Hecate.

Sobott's animated poems have been screened at numerous international film festivals and have won several awards.

== Bibliography ==
=== Non-fiction ===
- My Longest Round, Magabala Books, 2019

==== Essays ====
- ‘Interview with Dina Turkeya’, Don’t Matter, Treehopper Press, 2025
- 'Being Artists: Embracing curiosity and the risks of discovering the unknown', Disjunction, 2024
- ‘Commutare’, Sydney Review of Books, 2022
- ‘Disgust: What is not discussed in Australian politics’, Coming Back to Earth, Otway Journal, 2021
- 'No Trifling Matter’, Australian Women Writers Challenge, 2016
- ‘My Longest Round – The Writing Process’, Issue 81 Spring, Wasafiri, 2015
- ‘Humans Being’, Issue 5, Sable, 2004
- 'Young Days', Ed, Sydney: BYDS, 2013
- ‘Experiences of Batswana Women During the Second World War’, Vol. 13, Nos. 1&2, Pula Journal of African Studies, 1999
- ‘Laughter and the Medusa: An Interview with Jo Brand’, Journal of Gender Studies, 1999
- ‘Interview with Juby Mayet, Johannesburg, 29 July 1993’, Vol.3, No.3, Journal of Gender Studies, 1994

=== Children's books ===
- Tickles, Oxford: Heinemann, 1997
- The New Moon and the Rain Horn, The River that Went to the Sky, ed. Mary Medlicott, London: Kingfisher Larousse, 1995
- Mare’s Aunt, Harlow: Longman, 1995
- Tumelo and the Blue Birds, Oxford: Heinemann, 1995
- Weird Wambo, Oxford: Heinemann, 1994
- Speckled Eggs, Harlow: Longman, 1993
- Thara and the Cassipoohkaman, Harare: Baobab Press, 1992 (Zimbabwe Literature Prize)
- The Magic Pool, Oxford: Heinemann, 1991

=== Short fiction ===
==== Collections ====
- Colour Me Blue, Oxford: Heinemann, 1995

==== Stories ====
Title	Year	Published
"Zombie Crone"	2023	"No. 32", The Suburban Review, 2023
"The Apocrypha of O"	2021	"Not Quite Right For Us: Forty Writers Speak Volumes", flipped eye publishing, 2021
"Nkuku"	2021	"Nkuku", New Flash Fiction Review, 2021
"Grandmother"	2020	"New Contrast", Disability Arts Online, 2020
"Separation جدایی"	2019	Prometheus Dreaming, 2019
"Bahumagading"	2019	"Botswana Women Write", University of Kwazulu-Natal Press, 2019
"Little Tree"	2018	"Little Tree", Meanjin, 2018
"The Cry Room"	2018	Verity La, 2018
"The Sun is Shining"	2017	"Embody", Access2Arts, 2017
"Gesceap"	2013	"Vol.38", Hecate, 2013
"Dear Mary", "Always and Never at Home", "Another Little Peace of our Hearts" and "Spider Bite"	1995	"Fishwives and Fabulists", Liverpool: Manutius Press, 1995
"The Sea is Blue"	1995	"September 18-24, No.148", The Big Issue, 1995
‘"The Birth of Academic Alice"	1993	Tok, 1993
"Five to One"	1991	"Vol.9, No.3", Staffrider, 1991
"Hide Them Under the Bed"	1986	"Vol. 6, No.3", Staffrider, 1986
"The Hill"	1985	"Vol.6, No.2", Staffrider, 1985

=== Poetry ===
Title	Year	Published
"Exuviae"	2025	"Versus Versus", Bloodaxe Books, 2025
"My Green-Eyed Son"	2025	"Don't Matter", Treehopper Press, 2025
"Extracted – The Colonial War Continuum"	2025	"Don't Matter", Treehopper Press, 2025
"Wheeling the Sticky Delicious"	2024	"Raging Grace", Puncher and Wattmann, 2024
"Mind the Gap"	2024	"Raging Grace", Puncher and Wattmann, 2024
"Inquest – File No: COR2857/04(9)"	2023	"Archive, No.38", Rabbit, 2023
‘"how do we protect the mutant from annihilation by the 'normal'"	2022	The Massachusetts Review, 2022
"Invasion Species"	2021	"Invasion Species", Plumwood Mountain, 2021
"AstroTurf"	2021	"AstroTurf", Cordite Poetry Review, 2021
"Spectres"	2021	"Coming Back to Earth", Otway Journal, 2021
‘"I was born (Misfit)", "Dear Rosa", "Evacuate" and "Exuviae"	2021	in Showcase, Disability Arts Online, 2021
