= Jerry Jerome (boxer) =

Australian boxer

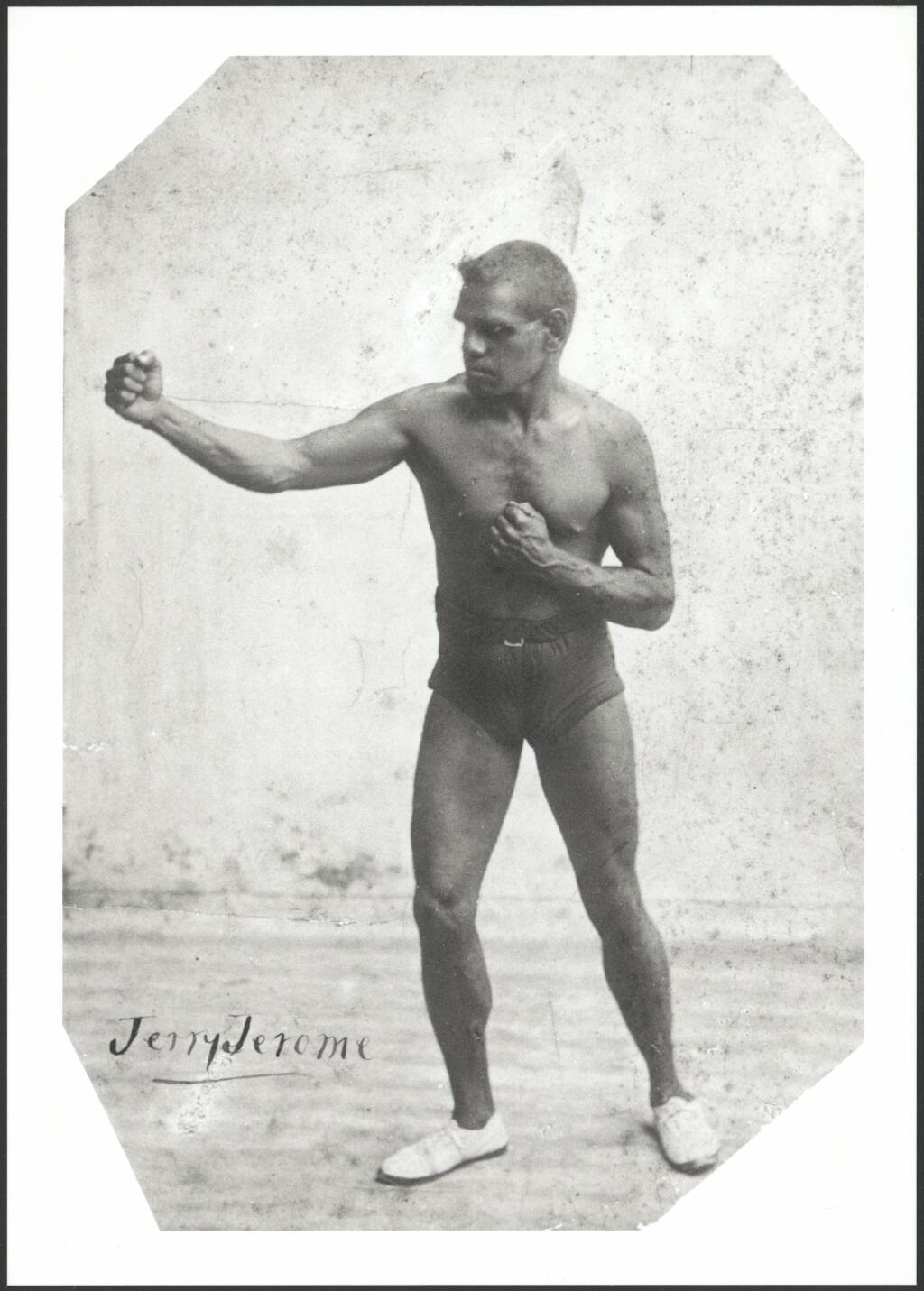
Jerry Jerome (1912)

Jerry Jerome (24 May 1874 – 27 September 1943) was born at Jimbour Homestead, near Dalby.

Jerome's father was Wollon Charles, an Aboriginal labourer, and his mother's name was Guli. He was a descendant of the Jarowair tribe. In 1906, Jerome married Alice Davis.

Jerome lived during the Control of Aboriginal Protection Act, which meant that his movement and life were restricted to the control of the Chief Protector. Before his fourth fight with Fred Booth, Jerome was arrested in Warra, due to the Protection Act. However, he was released in time for a fight in Toowoomba where he was knocked out, which had the crowds convinced that he had been drugged. In 1908, a Dalby citizen applied successfully for Jerome's exemption on the spurious ground that he was a 'half caste', in order to be removed from the controlled native listing, which would allow him to pursue a sporting career.

In 1908, at the age of 34, Jerome officially commenced boxing at "The Pines", a park near Warra, Queensland. This earned him the nickname of the "Warra Cyclone".

In 1912, Jerome fought Black Paddy, champion of Western Australia, which was possibly the first contest between two Aboriginal professional boxers. Black Paddy was born in Murchison, Queensland and later moved to Cue, Western Australia. In August 1912, Jerome defeated Black Paddy in a sixteen-round boxing match to a crowd of five thousand spectators in Brisbane. In the same year, Jerome was awarded the Australian middleweight boxing champion.

Jerome was the first Indigenous Australian to win a major boxing title—defeating Charlie Godfrey and claiming the Middleweight Championship of Australia in Brisbane on 7 September 1912.

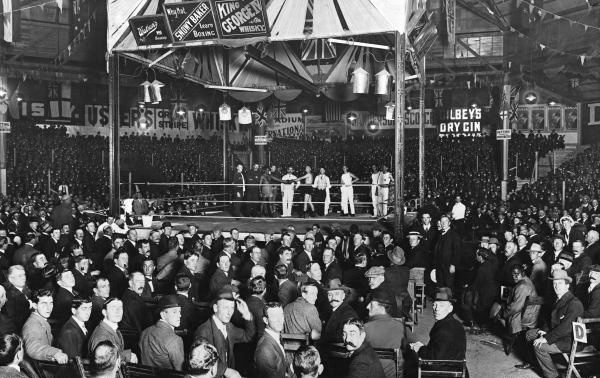
Dave Smith v Jerry Jerome at Sydney Stadium on 19 April 1913

In 1915, Jerome fought nine times before retiring from a ring career.

By 1943, Jerome had won approximately 20 first-class fights that awarded him around £5000. In 2025, this would be worth over $443,470 in Australian Dollars according to the Reserve Bank of Australia.

In 1919, Jerome was a resident on Fraser Island where he lost his aughter Myrtle. The young girl wasstricken with illness and taken to the Maryborough General Hospital where she died on 23 August 1919.

As Jerome was an Australian Aboriginal, his earnings were placed in trust by the government's Protector of Aborigines, who were notorious for not allowing Aborigines access to this trust (known today as 'Stolen Wages'.)

Jerome was moved to Barambah Aboriginal Settlement in Murgon, Queensland, where he spent his last years coaching promising Aboriginal boxers and refereeing their bouts.

In his professional career, Jerome fought 58 boxing battles; 35 of which were wins, and 23 of which were losses. In 1915, at the age of 41, Jerome resigned from boxing.

Jerome died on 27 September 1943 at Cherbourg Aboriginal Settlement, penniless, and was likely buried at Murgon cemetery. He was survived by his three sons and one of his two daughters. According to Truth newspaper, Jerome, a notorious comedian in the fight right, supposedly died with his famous bowler hat on.

Jerome was the 2008 Inductee for the Australian National Boxing Hall of Fame Old Timers category.
