= Peter Read (boxer) =

Australian boxer

Personal information
- Nationality: Australian
- Born: 12 October 1936 (age 88); Carlton North, Victoria, Australia

Sport
- Sport: Boxing

Peter Read (born 12 October 1936) is an Australian boxer. He competed in the men's light middleweight event at the 1956 Summer Olympics.
