= Al Korovou =

Fijian boxer

Personal information
- Born: Alipate Korovou circa 1947 (age 78–79) Lakeba, Lau Islands, Fiji
- Weight: middle/super middleweight

Boxing career
- Stance: Orthodox

Boxing record
- Total fights: 40
- Wins: 24 (KO 11)
- Losses: 15 (KO 5)
- Draws: 1

Alipate "Al" Korovou (born circa 1947 in Nasaqalau Lakeba, Lau Islands) is a Fijian professional middle/super middleweight boxer of the 1970s who won the New South Wales (Australia) State middleweight title, Australian middleweight title, Australian super middleweight title, and Commonwealth middleweight title, his professional fighting weight varied from 156 1/2 lb (71.0 kg; 11 st 2.5 lb), i.e. middleweight to 166 lb (75 kg; 11 st 12 lb), i.e. super middleweight.
