= Stan Wilson (cricketer) =

Australian cricketer

Personal information
- Full name: Stanley Vincent Wilson
- Born: 23 September 1948; Midland, Western Australia
- Died: 23 March 2022 (aged 73); Western Australia
- Nickname: Steamer
- Batting: Right-handed
- Bowling: Right-arm fast-medium
- Role: Bowler

Domestic team information
- Years: Team
- 1968/69–1972/73: Western Australia
- 1975/76: South Australia

Career statistics
Competition	FC
Matches	6
Runs scored	20
Batting average	10.00
100s/50s	0/0
Top score	14*
Balls bowled	837
Wickets	14
Bowling average	39.57
5 wickets in innings	0
10 wickets in match	0
Best bowling	4/29
Catches/stumpings	1/–
- Source: Cricinfo, 4 January 2023

Stanley Vincent Wilson (23 September 1948 – 23 March 2022) was an Australian cricketer. He played six first-class matches for Western Australia and South Australia between 1968–69 and 1975–76.

A right-arm pace bowler, Wilson was a stalwart for Midland-Guildford in the Perth competition but was unable to establish a place in the Western Australia team at a time when they had a wealth of pace bowlers. His best first-class figures were 4 for 29 for Western Australia against South Australia in December 1968.

== See also ==
- List of Western Australia first-class cricketers
