= Australian Middleweight Championship =

Professional wrestling championship

Statistics
- First champion(s): Jim Deakin
- Final champion(s): Lenny Holt
- Most reigns: Dick Cameron (2)

The Australian Middleweight Championship was a national Australian professional wrestling championship and was the first Middleweight Championship in Australia.

== Title history ==
| Wrestler: | Times: | Date won: | Location: | Notes: |
|---|---|---|---|---|
| Albert Hertel | 1 | | Melbourne | |
| Hughie Whitman | 1 | | Melbourne | Also billed as Australasian champion. |
| Anton Koolman | 1 | | Melbourne | |
| Hughie Whitman | 2 | | Melbourne | |
| Jim Deakin | 1 | 9 May 1931 | Sydney | Defeats Jack Haymon |
| VACANT | 1 | | Sydney | Deakin retired |
| Dick Cameron | 1 | 8 June 1935 | Sydney | |
| Sammy Rogers | 1 | 30 May 1936 | Sydney | |
| Dick Cameron | 2 | 27 May 1939 | Sydney | |
| INACTIVE | 1 | | Sydney | |
| Ray Greenfield | 1 | 28 February 1953 | Sydney | Defeats Len Holt |
| John Morrow | 1 | 17 August 1955 | Sydney | |
| Lenny Holt | 1 | 2 April 1957 | Sydney | Title retired in 1960 |

== See also ==
- Professional wrestling in Australia
