= Stan Wilson (footballer, born 1912) =

Australian rules footballer, born 1912

Personal information
- Full name: Stan Wilson
- Born: 12 October 1912
- Died: 13 November 2004 (aged 92)
- Original team: East Brunswick
- Height: 180 cm (5 ft 11 in)
- Weight: 73 kg (161 lb)
- Position: Halfback

Playing career^{1}
Years	Club	Games (Goals)
1936–41	Essendon	75 (7)
- ^{1} Playing statistics correct to the end of 1941.

Stan Wilson (12 October 1912 – 13 November 2004) was an Australian rules footballer who played with Essendon in the Victorian Football League (VFL).
