= Anthony Barber (boxer) =

Australian boxer

Tony Barber
Personal information
- Full name: Anthony Kenneth Barber
- Nationality: Australian
- Born: 25 November 1939
- Died: June 2004 (aged 64)

Sport
- Sport: Boxing

Anthony Kenneth Barber (25 November 1939 – June 2004) was an Australian boxer. He competed in the men's light middleweight event at the 1964 Summer Olympics. Barber lost to Frenchman Jo Gonzales in the quarter final.

As a professional Barber fought 10 times. In his 9th bout he won the Australian Middleweight title by defeating Dimitri Michael. In his final fight Barber lost by a 10-round stoppage to American Tony Montano despite flooring Montano four times. Montano once fought for the World Junior Middleweight championship.Barber also defeated Australian champion Dick Blair.
