= Farnan =

Farnan is an Irish surname. Outside of the British Isles, it is most prevalent in North America and Australia.

Notable people with this surname include:

- Bill Farnan (1851–1891), Australian boxer
- Jeff Farnan, American politician
- Jim Farnan (1875–1916), Australian footballer
- Joseph James Farnan Jr. (born 1945), American judge
- Mike Farnan (1941–2024), Canadian politician
- Paddy Farnan (born 1936), Irish Gaelic footballer
- Pat Farnan (1893–1980), Australian footballer
- Peter Farnan, Australian composer
- Poppy Farnan, British competitor in Love Island (2015 TV series)
- Robert Farnan (disambiguation)
- Tommy Farnan (1914–1977), New Zealand footballer
