= Thomas Lees =

Thomas Lees may refer to:

- Tom Lees (boxer) (1858-1947), Australian boxer
- Tom Lees (born 1990), English footballer

== See also ==
- Thomas Orde-Lees (1877-1958), Explorer
