= Bob Dunlop (boxer) =

Australian boxer

Personal information
- Nationality: Australian
- Born: 24 May 1945 Ivanhoe, Australia
- Died: March 2000 (aged 54)
- Height: 6 ft 0 in (1.83 m)
- Weight: super middle/light heavy/cruiser/heavyweight

Boxing career
- Stance: Orthodox

Boxing record
- Total fights: 45
- Wins: 39
- Win by KO: 21
- Losses: 6

Bob Dunlop (24 May 1945 – March 2000) was an Australian professional boxer who competed from 1963 to 1969. He held the Australian heavyweight title and Commonwealth light heavyweight title, and was a challenger for the Australian light heavyweight title against Clive Stewart. His professional fighting weight varied from super middleweight to heavyweight. He was inducted into the Australian National Boxing Hall of Fame in 2006.

== boxing record ==
https://boxrec.com/en/box-pro/29018

Awards and achievements
Preceded by Fred Casey	Australian heavyweight Championship	Succeeded by Foster Bibron
