= Peter Felix =

Australian boxer (1866–1926)

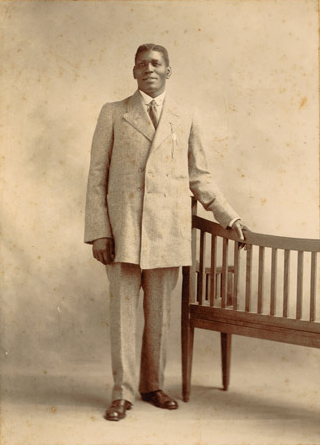

Personal information
- Nationality: Australian
- Born: Peter Felix; 17 July 1866 St. Croix, Danish West Indies
- Died: 10 November 1926 (aged 60)
- Weight: Heavyweight

Boxing career

Boxing record
- Total fights: 52
- Wins: 24
- Win by KO: 10
- Losses: 20
- Draws: 7

Peter Felix (17 July 1866 – 11 November 1926) was a boxer from Australia.

== Early life ==
Peter Felix was born on 17 July 1866 on the West Indian Island of St. Croix in the Danish West Indies, the same birthplace as boxer Peter Jackson. Felix claimed Jackson was his first cousin.

He travelled to Australia from St Croix in the 1880s, while in his early 20s, as a ship's fireman. Felix was tall for his time, standing at 6'5" tall, and weighing in around 180 pounds. He was said to be a flashy dresser, often wearing a "belltopper, spats, and frock coat."

== Boxing career ==
He started his boxing career in Australia in 1894 competing in amateur fights in Sydney. He then had 12th round knock out win over Dan Keeley in Melbourne. The year of 1895, proved to be one of the most fruitful of his career, with three very impressive points victories over Joe Goddard, and a points victory over Mick Dooley. 1896 saw him defeat Starlight Rollins, beat Mick Dooley in two out of three fights, and beat Dan Keeley for the Victorian Heavyweight title with a 5th round knock out win. The next two years saw him draw with Mick Dooley, Tut Ryan and Bill Doherty.

During the depression years of the 1890s, Peter Felix also fought in unofficial bouts in travelling boxing troupe's, which toured the agricultural shows of Australia, putting on their fights in tents. In 1899, he captured the coveted Australian Heavyweight title with a 7th round knock out win over Bill Doherty in Kalgoorlie. After his victory, a "lynching crowd" followed him to the railway station.

Next, he scored a draw with an old and sick Peter Jackson over 25 rounds in Melbourne. Prior to the Kalgoorlie fight, when Doherty had beaten Dooley to win the Australian crown. Dooley has been quoted as saying "You’re too good for me, Bill, but I would sooner lose to you than Felix. Keep" - his voice broke and died to almost a whisper – "Keep the championship white".Felix defended his title successfully with a 20-round draw with Doherty. He then lost the title in 1900 but then lost it to Doherty with 20-round points loss.

Felix never won the Australian title again, though he challenged for it three times, once against Doherty for a points loss in 1902, and twice against world title challenger Bill Lang for two knock out losses in 1907 and 1908 (Felix was 41 years old when he faced Lang).

In Felix's next notable bout in 1903 he beat the giant woodchopper Bill Heckenberg with a 2nd round knock out. He then drew with Arthur Cripps and beat George Renaulf on points. Age was starting to catch up with the old warhorse, though he was still fighting in main events.The years of 1904 and 1905 saw him lose against world title challengers Bill Squires and "Gunner" James Moir. In 1907, Felix challenged the legendary Jack Johnson for World Colored Heavyweight Championship. Felix was knocked out in the first round.

Felix kept fighting until 1915 (aged 48 years old), though his last real "big time" fight was in 1908 in the very first main event ever held at the Sydney Stadium against Bill Russell. In this fight he lost on points over 20 rounds to Bill Russell. His last match was in 1911.

== Post-boxing career ==
After retiring from boxing, Felix lived in Sydney, taught boxing, and acted in many of Oscar Asche's plays. He coached Jerome Jerry, the first Aboriginal boxing titleholder, in the 1910s.

Felix died in Sydney on 10 November 1926 at age 60. Over 100 people attended his funeral, including the Minister for Justice and champion boxers.

Felix was a 2012 Inductee for the Australian National Boxing Hall of Fame.
