= Larry Foley =

Australian boxer (1849–1917)

Personal information
- Nationality: Australian (Australia)
- Born: Laurence Foley; 12 December 1849 Sofala, New South Wales, Australia
- Died: 7 December 1917 (aged 67) Sofala, New South Wales, Australia
- Height: 5 ft 8.75 in (1.75 m)
- Weight: Averaged 147 lb (67 kg), In early career Range 140–154 lb

Boxing career
- Stance: Orthodox

Boxing record
- Total fights: 21 (Before 1884)
- Wins: 17
- Win by KO: 17
- Losses: 1
- Draws: 3

Laurence 'Larry' Foley (12 December 1849 – 12 July 1917) was an Australian middleweight boxer. An exceptional boxing instructor, his students included American champions Peter Jackson, and Tommy Burns, the incomparable English-born triple weight class champion Bob Fitzsimmons and Australian champion Mike Dooley. Due to his success as a boxing champion and internationally acclaimed instructor, and for introducing his country to the modern Queensberry Rules, he is often referred to as the "Father of Australian Boxing".

== Early life ==
Foley was born to an Irish schoolmaster, Patrick, and his wife Mary (née Downs) in Bathurst, New South Wales on 12 December 1849. He was baptised a few years later on 2 May 1852 in Penrith. At three his family moved to Sydney, and at fourteen he moved to Wollongong as servant to a Roman Catholic priest with the expectation that he would join the priesthood, although this never happened.

Foley returned to Sydney where, at the age of 20, he worked as a building labourer and eventually as a sub-foreman and building contractor. In his youth in Sydney he joined a Catholic or 'Green' street-fighting gang, often fighting members of a rival 'Orange' or Protestant group. His first fight, lasting seventy-one rounds, was believed to have been on 18 March 1871 against Sandy Ross, a leader of the Orange gang, which only ended when police stopped the fight. He was known as 'Captain of the Push' after the Rocks Push street gang in Sydney. On 17 September 1873 he married Mary Anne Hayes. Sporting patron George Hill, a member of the "Fancy", recognized Foley's exceptional ability and helped set up several exhibitions and prizefights. Between 1872–76, Foley defeated at least six opponents by knockout in New South Wales, earning a reputation as a talented middleweight who in time might fight for a championship. On 2 December 1878, Foley fought a championship bout with Peter Newton, though the recorded dates of the fight vary, as do the number of rounds. The fight was declared a draw as the police intervened in the 40th round, and no decision of a winner was made.

== Career ==
=== Middleweight world champion, 1879 ===
Having abandoned street fighting, he moved into prizefights and exhibitions, winning or drawing all but one of them, including a gloved exhibition in 1877 with former English champion Jem Mace in Sydney, who would become a friend and mentor. On 20 March 1879, he fought Abe Hicken bare-knuckle by London Prize Ring Rules, four miles from Warparilla, near Echuca, on the New South Wales side of the River Murray. He had been reluctant to fight Abe Hicken in an antiquated bare-knuckle bout, and his friend Jem Mace discouraged him from accepting the challenge, but Hicken had claimed he was the true Australian champion, and Foley accepted the challenge regardless of the extra risk inherent in bare knuckle boxing under London Prize Ring Rules. Over a thousand spectators assembled at the remote spot to watch the contest for the Australian middleweight championship and a purse of £500 a side. Though not highly significant, he had an advantage of one or two inches and around five pounds on his opponent, and this factor may have influenced the early betting which gave Hicken, already a champion, odds of 2–1. The fight was considered by many to be the Middleweight championship of the world. A constable was sent to arrest both men for the illegal sport of prize fighting, and warrants for their arrest had been completed, but the policeman who attended the bout was ignored, and the fight commenced on time. Foley won by knockout in 16 rounds, in one hour and twenty minutes as Hicken, exhausted and badly beaten, fell. Back home in Sydney a concert and subscription fund were organized for Foley.

Foley followed his victory over Hicken with a three round win by knockout over Harry Sellars on 1 July 1879 at Redfern in Sydney, though the dates of the bout vary somewhat. In the following years, though he continued to fight exhibitions and no decision bouts, Foley retired from his defence of the middleweight championship.

==== Training champions ====
By 1879, Foley had managed two Sydney hotels; first the United Service Hotel and then the White Horse. One of his responsibilities was tending bar at his hotels, though unlike many of his fellow boxers, he was a tetotaler by most accounts. After his victory over Hicken, Foley opened a boxing academy at his White Horse Hotel on George Street, though he likely held matches there earlier. Former English champion Jem Mace, who trained Foley for his championship bout with Hicken, helped open the school and continued as an instructor. At his gym at the White Horse, Foley taught, trained and guided the careers of the great boxers Young Griffo, Bob Fitzsimmons, Paddy Slavin, and Peter Jackson as well as the lesser known Dan Creedon and George Dawson. He was known worldwide for the quality of his boxing training, and acted as a promoter as well at times, helping to mold the career of his most gifted student Bob Fitzsimmons, who would become a champion in three weight classes.

Foley's greatest contribution to boxing was as an advocate for the modern Marquess of Queensberry Rules, which revolutionized Australian boxing by allowing finesse, speed, and defensive technique to replace much of the brutality more common with the former London Prize Ring Rules. He helped introduce Queensberry Rules at his boxing academy and in the fights held there at his Ironpot Stadium in the back of the White Horse hotel, and he incorporated the scientific, straight-punching methods he learned during his own brilliant career into the techniques he taught his students.

==== Australian heavyweight championship ====
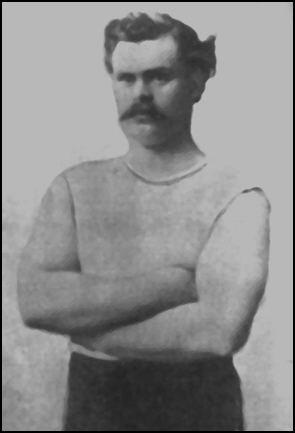
Will Miller

At the advanced age of 39, Foley came out of boxing retirement to fight a gloved battle using the modern Marquess of Queensberry Rules against "Professor" William Miller in Sydney, New South Wales on 28 May 1883 for the championship of Australia. Due to Miller's weight of around 190, the bout was a heavyweight championship. Unofficially declared a draw, the forty round bout and the £500 purse were given to Miller on the next day when Foley conceded he had lost the fight. Miller was a considerably larger and more muscular man, with nearly a forty pound advantage in weight to Foley's light middleweight class of around 158 pounds. The contest lasted three hours and would have been called far earlier if held today, as Foley took a great deal of punishment. Though he had a lead in the first hour, the tide turned and Miller's strong and constant left to Foley's face began to take its toll. In the 37th and 40th rounds, a right by Miller knocked Foley to the mat. Around the 40th round, spectators climbed into the ring, and the police were forced to stop the fight, with the referee postponing the ruling or calling a temporary draw til the following day.

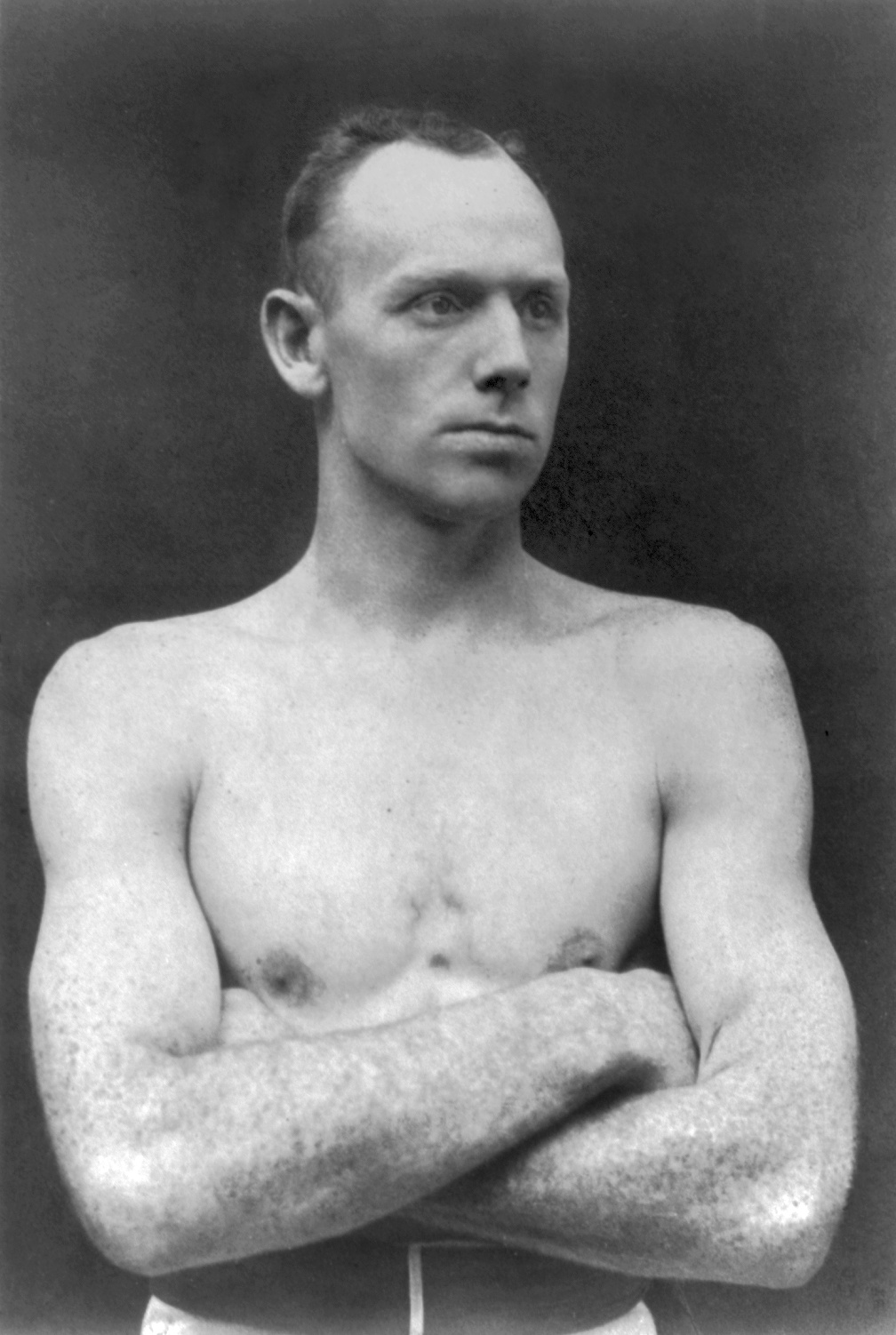
Bob Fitzsimmons

In 1884, Foley fought exhibitions to large crowds in Melbourne and Sydney with several of his top rated former opponents including both Miller and Hicken and strongly preferred to use gloves. Continuing a year of exhibitions, on 12 December 1885, he fought a four round no decision bout, which might be considered an exhibition, against the incomparable English champion Bob Fitzsimmons in Sydney. In his career, Foley acted as both a discoverer of Fitzsimmons' enormous talent, and as his boxing instructor from his earliest days in the ring. He fought an exhibition with another of his gifted students, Black boxer Peter Jackson, a future Australian heavyweight champion, in Sydney in May 1885. He continued to exclusively fight exhibitions and no decision bouts in 1886, but against somewhat less famous and accomplished opponents. On 30 July 1837 in Sydney, he fought a three round exhibition with his student Mick Dooley, a future Australian heavyweight champion.

Flush with earnings from his lucrative year of exhibitions he married his second wife Mary Hoins on 12 November 1887 in Randwick.

Foley fought two very short exhibitions with the first black American world heavyweight champion Jack Johnson in 1907–8 in Sydney. The first was a three round exhibition at Queen's Hall, and the second was a four round charity bout at Manley Skating Rink. Still a contemporary figure in some ways, Johnson was posthumously pardoned in 2018 by President Donald Trump for his 1912 Mann Act arrest. In one of his last known exhibitions on 2 May 1910, Foley sparred with onetime world and Australian heavyweight champion, American Tommy Burns in Sydney.

The former middleweight champion also first appeared in October 1880 at Queens Theatre in Sydney in a production of As You Like It, as the character Charles, the wrestler. The touring American actress Louise Pomeroy played the character of "Rosalind". He briefly attempted to work as a theatre manager, and later appeared in several additional performances as Charles in Sydney in 1882 and at the Royal Standard Theatre from 1886–87.

=== Work in the public sector ===
Until his resignation in 1903, he was the official demolition contractor for New South Wales. Since his early days as a building laborer, he was an associate and friend of Edward O'Sullivan, the Sydney Minister of Public Works, as well as a journalist, politician, and labour party member, who held a seat in Parliament for eighteen years. In addition to his job as demolition contractor, his political contacts put him in consideration for a position as serjeant-at-arms in the Australian parliament, and he later contemplated running for the parliamentary seat for the city of Yass in 1903.

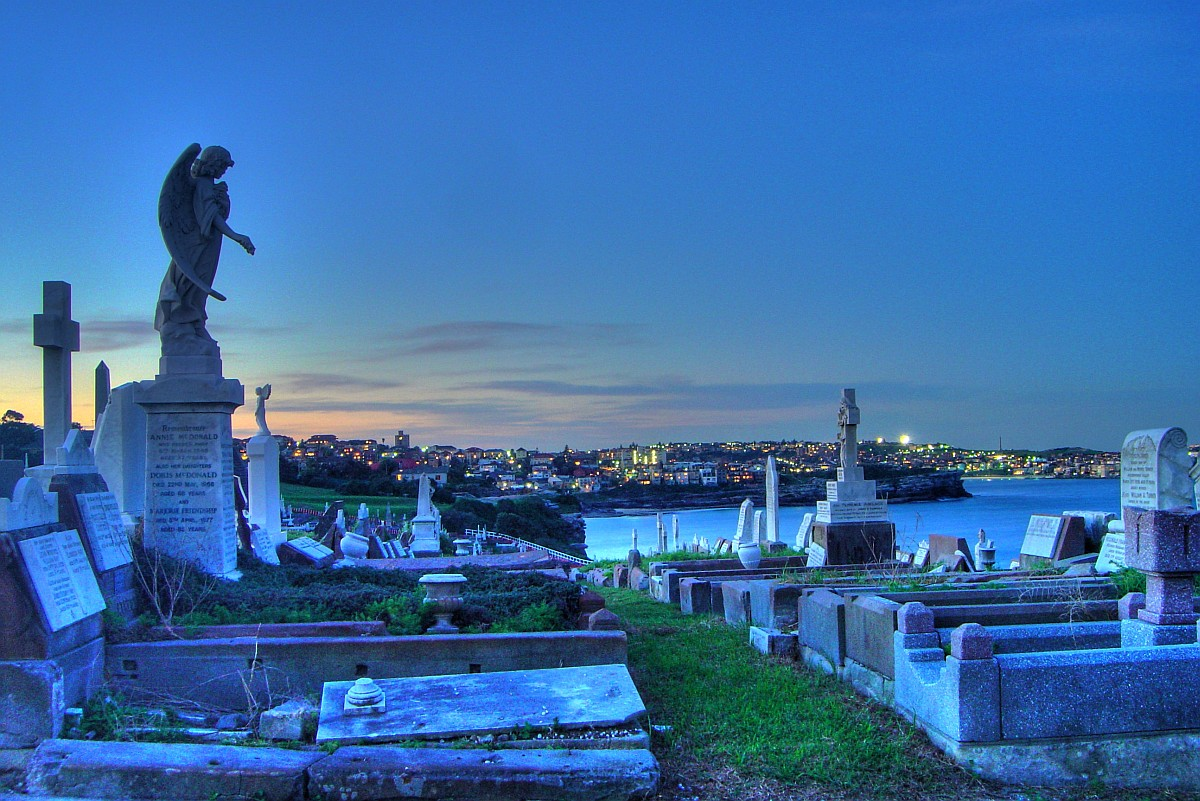
Waverly Cemetery

== Death ==
Foley died of heart disease on 12 July 1917, at Vincent's Hospital in Sydney and after a mass at St. Mary's Cathedral on July 15, he was buried in the Catholic section of Waverley Cemetery. He was survived by a son and two daughters from his first marriage and three sons and a daughter from his second. His funeral was well attended and due to his years of public service included the Mayor of Sydney, and a number of aldermen and city officials.

== Selected fights ==
2 Wins, 1 Draw, 1 Loss
Result	Opponent(s)	Date	Location	Duration	Notes
Win	Sandy Ross	9 March 1871	Sydney, New South Wales	4 Rounds, Won by Knockout; London Prize Ring Rules	Ross was once a leader of a rival Protestant gang He was three inches taller, and thirty pounds heavier
Draw	Peter Newton	2 Dec 1878	Melbourne, Australia	42 Rounds, ruled a draw Poorly publicized bout with gloves	Stopped by police, but believed to be a championship bout Also fought twice, July 1886, Foley's White Horse Gym
Win	Abe Hicken	9 March 1879	Echuca, New South Wales	16 Rounds, Won by Knockout; London Prize Ring Rules	Bare knuckle Middleweight Championship of Australia
Loss	William Miller	20 May 1883	Melbourne, Victoria, Australia	40 rounds, spectators broke into ring Marquess of Queensberry Rules	Lost attempt at Australian Heavyweight Championship, Conceded loss

== Bibliography ==
- Horton, W.M. (1972). "Foley, Laurence (Larry) (1849–1917)". Australian Dictionary of Biography. Melbourne, Australia: Melbourne University Publishing.
- Roberts, Kenneth, (1963) Captain of the Push, Melbourne Australia, Landsdowne Press
