= Lucas Browne =

Australian boxer and mixed martial artist (born 1979)

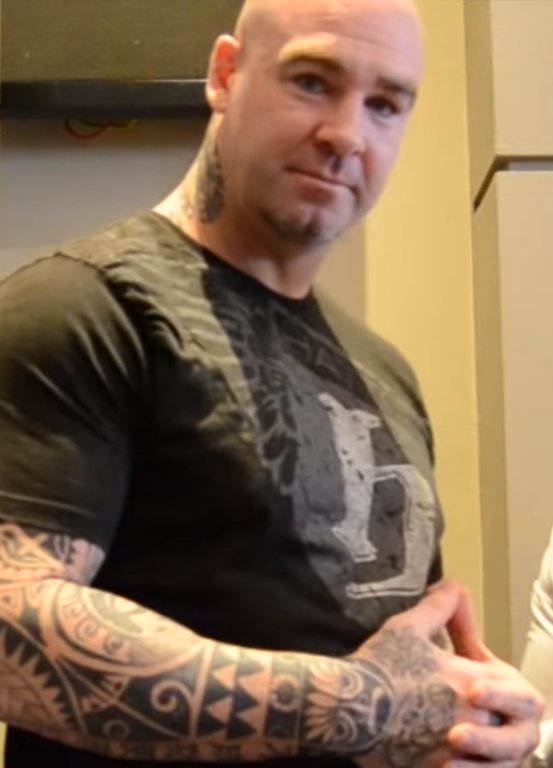
- Browne in 2014
- Born: 14 April 1979 (age 47); Auburn, New South Wales, Australia
- Other names: Big Daddy
- Height: 1.96 m (6 ft 5 in)
- Division: Heavyweight
- Reach: 196 cm (77 in)

Professional boxing record
- Total: 39
- Wins: 32
- By knockout: 27
- Losses: 7
- By knockout: 7
- No contests: 0

Mixed martial arts record
- Total: 8
- Wins: 6
- By knockout: 6
- Losses: 2
- By knockout: 2

Other information
- Website: www.lucas-browne.com
- Boxing record from BoxRec
- Mixed martial arts record from Sherdog
- Last updated on: 12 May 2024

Lucas Browne (born 14 April 1979) is an Australian professional boxer, bare-knuckle boxer signed to BKB Bare Knuckle Boxing in the heavyweight division, and former mixed martial artist. In boxing, he held the WBA (Regular) heavyweight title in 2016. At regional level, he has held multiple heavyweight championships, including the Australian title in 2012; and the Commonwealth title from 2014 to 2015. He is the first Australian to win a world heavyweight title in boxing history.

== Professional boxing career ==
=== Early career ===
Browne turned professional on 20 March 2009 at the age of 30. He won his first contest by fourth-round knockout. On 17 February 2012, Browne became the Australian heavyweight champion by knocking out Colin Wilson in three rounds.

On 28 April 2013, he defeated the future hall of famer and three-weight division world champion James Toney by twelve round unanimous decision with scores of 117–111, 119–109, and 120–108. Three months later, he stopped former NABF heavyweight champion Travis Walker in seven rounds. Walker dropped Browne in round 1. Although Walker appeared to clearly win round 7, his corner called the fight off before round 8 could get underway.

In November 2013, Browne scored a fifth-round TKO of former European Union heavyweight champion Richard Towers. The fight was an eliminator for the Commonwealth heavyweight title, which at the time was held by David Price.

=== Regional success ===
On 26 April 2014, Browne fought Éric Martel-Bahoéli for the vacant Commonwealth heavyweight title at the Ponds Forge Arena in Sheffield, England. Browne knocked down Martel-Bahoéli in round 2 but the fight continued. In round 3, following an accidental clash of heads, Browne was cut over the left eye. Two inspections were undertaken by the ringside doctor, who allowed the fight continue. Martel-Bahoéli was knocked down again in round 4 and the end came in round 5 when Browne connected with a right uppercut. Browne also claimed the WBC Eurasian Pacific Boxing Council heavyweight title.

==== Browne vs. Rudenko ====
Browne defended the WBC-EPBC title on 1 August 2014 against Andriy Rudenko (24–0) at the Civic Hall in Wolverhampton, England. Browne defeated Rudenko by a 12-round unanimous decision to win the vacant WBA Inter-Continental heavyweight title. The judges scored the fight 116–112, 115–113, and 117–112 all in favour of Browne.

==== Browne vs. Chagaev ====
On 14 November 2015, the WBA ordered Ruslan Chagaev to reach a deal to make a defence of his WBA title against Australian heavyweight contender Browne. The two sides had until 30 November to reach a deal. Chagaev's promoter Timur Dugazaev announced the fight would likely take place in Grozny in March 2016. In the January 2016, the fight was officially announced to take place on 5 March. Browne won the fight by stopping Chagaev in the tenth round. Browne landed nearly 20 unanswered punches, mostly right hands, before referee Stanley Christodoulou stopped the fight at 2 minutes, 27 seconds. Browne was knocked down in the sixth round and at the time of the knockout, behind on all judges scorecards, 81–88, 82–88, and 82–88. The fight was not without controversy, with a reported 59 seconds of erroneous time during rounds 6 and 7 of the bout.

==== Drug issues ====
Browne was later stripped of the title due to a failed drug test for the banned substance clenbuterol, though his victory over Chagaev was never overturned. Browne repeatedly maintained his innocence, however testing on the second sample for the drug proved positive.

On 2 November 2016, the WBA ordered Browne to fight American heavyweight veteran Shannon Briggs for the WBA regular title. The fight was ordered to take place before the end of 2016. Browne was originally due to fight Fres Oquendo, who hadn't fought since 2014, however that fight could not be made due to Oquendo recovering from an injury. The WBA ordered the winner of this bout to fight Oquendo in a mandatory defense within 120 days.

Just eight months after being stripped of the WBA heavyweight title due to positive A and B samples for the banned substance clenbuterol, Browne produced another positive drug test, this time for the banned substance ostarine.

On 18 May 2017, Browne's manager, Matt Clark announced that he would be making a return to the ring on 2 June 2017 at the Club Punchbowl in Sydney. On 26 May, his opponent was announced as journeyman Mathew Greer (16–20, 13 KOs). In a scheduled six round fight, Browne dropped and stopped the over matched Greer in round 2. After the win, Browne set his sights on WBO heavyweight champion Joseph Parker.

==== Browne vs. Whyte ====
On 17 October 2017, it was reported that Browne would travel to Moscow, Russia, to fight unbeaten 30-year-old Sergei Kuzmin (11–0, 8 KOs) for the WBA Inter-Continental title on 27 November. Kuzmin, known for his amateur background where he beat the likes of Joe Joyce, Robert Cammarelle and Ivan Dychko. Browne backed out of the fight and was replaced by American boxer Amir Mansour. On 7 November, it was reported that Browne had signed a deal to challenge undefeated WBO heavyweight champion Joseph Parker. Locations discussed were Parker's home city of Auckland or Melbourne in Australia. Browne's promoter Matt Clark stated that Browne had signed the contract and was now waiting on Parker to sign the deal. At the time, Browne was not listed in the WBO's top 15 rankings, meaning he would need to fight for a WBO regional title to get ranked. On 11 January 2018, the fight between Browne and WBC Silver heavyweight champion Dillian Whyte was finally made, to take place at the O2 Arena in London on 24 March. In order to win Whyte's WBC Silver title, Browne vowed to get into immense physical condition, joining the weight loss challenge at F45 Kellyville Ridge, while also adding the burn machine to his strength and conditioning program.

Whyte hit Browne with a hard left hook to the head in round 6 to knock him down and out unconscious, winning the fight. There was no count made and the fight was waved off immediately with ringside doctors attending to Browne before giving him oxygen. The fight was officially stopped at 0:37 of the round. Browne's face was cut and badly swollen from the clean shots landed from Whyte. Browne left himself open most of the time and tried switching stances after a few rounds. Browne suffered a cut over his left eye in round 3, which got worse with each round. Whyte then bloodied Browne's nose in round 5. After the fight, Browne was stretchered to a nearby hospital for precaution and Whyte called out WBC champion Deontay Wilder for a fight in June 2018. Promoter Hearn said, "I hope the WBC make Dillian mandatory now, the fight is there for Deontay Wilder in June. We have to force the shot and after that performance, he deserves the shot." Hearn stated there could be a possibility that the WBC order a final eliminator between Whyte and Dominic Breazeale.

==== Back to winning ways ====
Browne returned to the ring on 28 September 2018 at the Convention and Exhibition Centre in Gold Coast and knocked out 41-year-old Julius Long (18–20, 14 KOs) for a second time in three years. A right hand to the chin knocked out Long. After the fight, Browne called out Dave Allen and Adam Kownacki. He was also called out by David Price in October.

Browne returned two months later on 24 November against journeyman Junior Pati at the Saint Johns Netball Centre in Auckland, New Zealand. The fight marked Browne's first time fighting in the country as a professional. Browne controlled the fight, eventually knocking Pati out in round 5 with a left hook followed by a right uppercut. Referee Lance Revill waved off the fight. Browne also claimed the vacant WBC Asian Boxing Council silver title. After the fight, Browne published a short video on his Instagram account crediting his return to F45 at Kellyville Ridge and the addition of an intense swimming pool preparation as being the key contributors to his immense physical condition.

On 2 March 2019, Browne fought Kamil Sokolowski. Browne won the six round bout on points.

In his next fight, Browne faced David Allen. The first two rounds didn't provide too much action, but in the third round Allen caught Browne with a vicious body shot and knocked him down. Browne was not able to recover and Allen was awarded the KO victory in the third round.

On 21 April 2021, Browne went up against Paul Gallen and lost via first-round technical knockout.

==== Final fight and retirement ====
Browne announced his retirement from boxing following a first-round defeat to New Zealand's Hemi Ahio at the RAC Arena in Perth, Australia, on 12 May 2024.

== Bare-knuckle boxing ==
In September 2025, Browne began his career in bare-knuckle boxing, signed under BKB Bare Knuckle Boxing. He made his debut against Corey Harrison, where he won by doctor stoppage at the beginning of round 2. Browne then fought for the BKB Heavyweight Championship against Gustavo Trujillo, where he lost by knockout in the first round.

== Personal life ==
Browne is a single parent and has a daughter and two sons. Before beginning his career in combat sports he was a nightclub bouncer in Kings Cross and a professional rugby league footballer for the Parramatta Eels under-18s in the S. G. Ball Cup. Browne also made it to the top 50 of Australian Idol 2004.

== Professional boxing record ==
39 fights	32 wins	7 losses
By knockout	27	7
By decision	5	0

No.	Result	Record	Opponent	Type	Round, time	Date	Location	Notes
39	Loss	32–7	Arman Khudoyan	TKO	6 (6), 2:37	11 Oct 2025	Forum Leverkusen, Leverkusen, Germany	
38	Win	32–6	Tony Giles	UD	3	25 Jul 2025	The O2 Arena, London, England	
37	Loss	31–6	Hemi Ahio	TKO	1 (8), 2:01	12 May 2024	Perth Arena, Perth, Australia	
36	Loss	31−5	Mark Petrovsky	TKO	4 (8), 1:34	9 Dec 2023	Agenda Arena, Dubai, UAE	
35	Loss	31–4	Jarrell Miller	TKO	6 (10), 2:33	18 Mar 2023	Agenda Arena, Dubai, UAE	
34	Win	31–3	Junior Fa	KO	1 (10), 1:58	5 Jun 2022	Marvel Stadium, Melbourne, Australia	Retained WBA Oceania heavyweight title; Won vacant IBF Australasian heavyweight title
33	Win	30–3	Faiga Opelu	KO	7 (10), 2:59	4 Dec 2021	Fortitude Music Hall, Brisbane, Australia	Won vacant WBA Oceania heavyweight title
32	Loss	29–3	Paul Gallen	TKO	1 (6), 1:55	21 Apr 2021	WIN Entertainment Centre, Wollongong, Australia	
31	Win	29–2	John Hopoate	TKO	2 (6), 2:55	9 Nov 2019	St Marys Band Club, Sydney, Australia	
30	Loss	28–2	David Allen	KO	3 (12), 0:58	20 Apr 2019	The O2 Arena, London, England	
29	Win	28–1	Kamil Sokolowski	UD	6	2 Mar 2019	Trump Turnberry, South Ayrshire, Scotland	
28	Win	27–1	Junior Pati	KO	5 (8), 2:35	24 Nov 2018	Saint Johns Netball Centre, Auckland, New Zealand	Won inaugural ABCO Silver heavyweight title
27	Win	26–1	Julius Long	KO	3 (8), 1:04	28 Sep 2018	Convention and Exhibition Centre, Gold Coast, Australia	
26	Loss	25–1	Dillian Whyte	KO	6 (12), 0:37	24 Mar 2018	The O2 Arena, London, England	For WBC Silver heavyweight title
25	Win	25–0	Matthew Greer	TKO	2 (6), 1:14	2 Jun 2017	Club Punchbowl, Sydney, Australia	
24	Win	24–0	Ruslan Chagaev	TKO	10 (12), 2:02	5 Mar 2016	Colosseum Sport Hall, Grozny, Russia	Won WBA (Regular) heavyweight title; Browne was later stripped of the title after failing a drug test, but his victory was upheld
23	Win	23–0	Julius Long	KO	9 (10), 2:59	14 Aug 2015	Pavilion, Melbourne, Australia	
22	Win	22–0	Chauncy Welliver	RTD	5 (12), 3:00	12 Nov 2014	Hisense Arena, Melbourne, Australia	Retained WBA Inter-Continental and EPBC heavyweight titles
21	Win	21–0	Andriy Rudenko	UD	12	1 Aug 2014	Civic Hall, Wolverhampton, England	Retained EPBC heavyweight title; Won vacant WBA Inter-Continental heavyweight title
20	Win	20–0	Éric Martel-Bahoéli	KO	5 (12), 1:26	26 Apr 2014	Ponds Forge, Sheffield, England	Won vacant Commonwealth and EPBC heavyweight titles
19	Win	19–0	Clarence Tillman	KO	2 (6), 2:23	13 Dec 2013	Pavilion, Melbourne, Australia	
18	Win	18–0	Richard Towers	TKO	5 (12), 0:51	2 Nov 2013	Hull Arena, Hull, England	
17	Win	17–0	Travis Walker	RTD	7 (10), 3:00	25 Jul 2013	Pavilion, Melbourne, Australia	
16	Win	16–0	James Toney	UD	12	28 Apr 2013	Convention and Exhibition Centre, Melbourne, Australia	Won vacant WBF (Foundation) heavyweight title
15	Win	15–0	Kotatsu Takehara	KO	1 (8), 1:08	1 Mar 2013	Lions Richlands, Brisbane, Australia	
14	Win	14–0	Jason Gavern	TKO	3 (10), 2:23	11 Dec 2012	Convention and Exhibition Centre, Hong Kong, SAR	
13	Win	13–0	Hastings Rasani	TKO	1 (6), 0:44	16 Jun 2012	Manchester Velodrome, Manchester, England	
12	Win	12–0	Paul Butlin	TKO	4 (6), 1:15	21 Apr 2012	Sports Centre, Oldham, England	
11	Win	11–0	Colin Wilson	KO	3 (10), 2:56	17 Feb 2012	Southport RSL Club, Gold Coast, Australia	Won vacant Australian heavyweight title
10	Win	10–0	Alipate Liava'a	TKO	1 (4), 1:51	9 Dec 2011	WA Italian Club, Perth, Australia	
9	Win	9–0	Paula Lakai	KO	4 (4), 1:57	5 Nov 2011	WA Italian Club, Perth, Australia	
8	Win	8–0	Fai Falamoe	TKO	5 (10), 2:59	30 Sep 2011	Campbelltown Stadium, Sydney, Australia	Won vacant WBF (Foundation) Asia-Pacific heavyweight title
7	Win	7–0	Clarence Tillman	UD	12	5 Aug 2011	Goldfields Oasis Recreation Centre, Kalgoorlie, Australia	Won vacant UBC Intercontinental heavyweight title
6	Win	6–0	Scott Belshaw	KO	2 (4), 1:40	13 May 2011	Melbourne Pavilion, Melbourne, Australia	
5	Win	5–0	Henry Taani	KO	1 (6), 2:34	15 Apr 2011	WA Basketball Centre, Perth, Australia	
4	Win	4–0	Alipate Liava'a	KO	3 (6), 1:35	2 Apr 2011	Goldfields Oasis Recreation Centre, Kalgoorlie, Australia	
3	Win	3–0	John Szigeti	KO	3 (6), 1:17	4 Feb 2011	Southport RSL Club, Gold Coast, Australia	
2	Win	2–0	Sam Leuii	TKO	1 (4), 2:10	1 Jul 2010	Penrith Stadium, Sydney, Australia	
1	Win	1–0	Jason Keir	KO	4 (4), 0:33	20 Mar 2009	Manly Leagues Club, Sydney, Australia	

== Mixed martial arts record ==
Professional record breakdown
8 matches	6 wins	2 losses
By knockout	6	2

Res.	Record	Opponent	Method	Event	Date	Round	Time	Location	Notes
Loss	6–2	Jim York	TKO (punches)	XMMA: Xtreme MMA 3	5 November 2010	2	1:52	Sydney, Australia	
Win	6–1	Sam Brown	KO (punches)	Shamrock Events: Kings of Kombat 1	29 August 2010	3	3:16	Melbourne, Australia	
Loss	5–1	Daniel Cormier	TKO (punches)	XMMA 2: ANZ vs. USA	31 July 2010	1	4:35	Sydney, Australia	
Win	5–0	Leamy Tato	TKO (punches)	XMMA 1: Xtreme MMA	20 December 2009	2	2:42	Sydney, Australia	Won the XMMA Heavyweight Championship.
Win	4–0	Willie Moon	TKO (punches)	CFC: Cage Fighting Championships 11	20 November 2009	1	N/A	Sydney, Australia	
Win	3–0	Felise Leniu	KO (punches)	CFC 10: Light heavyweight Grand Prix Finals	21 August 2009	2	1:14	Sydney, Australia	
Win	2–0	Tui Wright	TKO (doctor stoppage)	CFC 8: Light heavyweight Grand Prix	22 May 2009	1	0:23	Sydney, Australia	
Win	1–0	Jeff King	TKO (punches)	CFC 7: Battle at the Big Top	20 February 2009	2	1:47	Sydney, Australia	

=== Mixed martial arts titles ===
Xtreme MMA

- XMMA Heavyweight Championship (One time)

== Bare knuckle record ==
Professional record breakdown
2 matches	1 win	1 loss
By knockout	1	1

Res.	Record	Opponent	Method	Event	Date	Round	Time	Location	Notes
Loss	1–1	Gustavo Trujillo	KO	BKB 48: Brawl in the Pines V	November 22, 2025	1		Pembroke Pines, Florida United States	For the BKB Heavyweight Championship.
Win	1–0	Corey Harrison	TKO	BKB 45: Bristol Brawl	September 6, 2025	2	0:01	Bristol, England	

== See also ==
- List of heavyweight boxing champions
- List of mixed martial artists with professional boxing records

Sporting positions
Regional boxing titles
Vacant Title last held by Auckland Auimatagi	WBF (Foundation) Asia-Pacific heavyweight champion 30 September 2011 – 28 April 2013; Won full title	Vacant Title next held by Hunter Sam
Vacant Title last held by Michael Kirby	Australian heavyweight champion 17 February 2012 – September 2012; Vacated	Vacant Title next held by Solomon Haumono
Vacant Title last held by David Price	Commonwealth heavyweight champion 26 April 2014 – September 2015; Vacated	Vacant Title next held by Anthony Joshua
New title	EPBC heavyweight champion 26 April 2014 – October 2015; Vacated	Vacant Title next held by Joseph Parker
Vacant Title last held by David Haye	WBA Inter-Continental heavyweight champion 1 August 2014 – 5 March 2016; Won world title	Vacant Title next held by Luis Ortiz
New title	ABCO Silver heavyweight champion 24 November 2018 – 2019; Vacated	Vacant Title next held by Serdar Avci
Preceded by Faiga Opelu	WBA Oceania heavyweight champion 4 December 2021 – March 2023; Vacated	Vacant Title next held by Joseph Goodall
Vacant Title last held by Kevin Johnson	IBF Australasian heavyweight champion 5 June 2022 – March 2023 vacated	Vacant
Minor world boxing titles
Vacant Title last held by Kali Meehan	WBF (Foundation) heavyweight champion 28 April 2013 – November 2013; Vacated	Vacant Title next held by Mark de Mori
World boxing titles
Preceded by Ruslan Chagaev	WBA heavyweight champion Regular title 5 March 2016 – 12 May 2016; Stripped	Vacant Title next held by Ruslan Chagaev
