= Joe Goddard (boxer) =

Australian boxer (1857–1903)

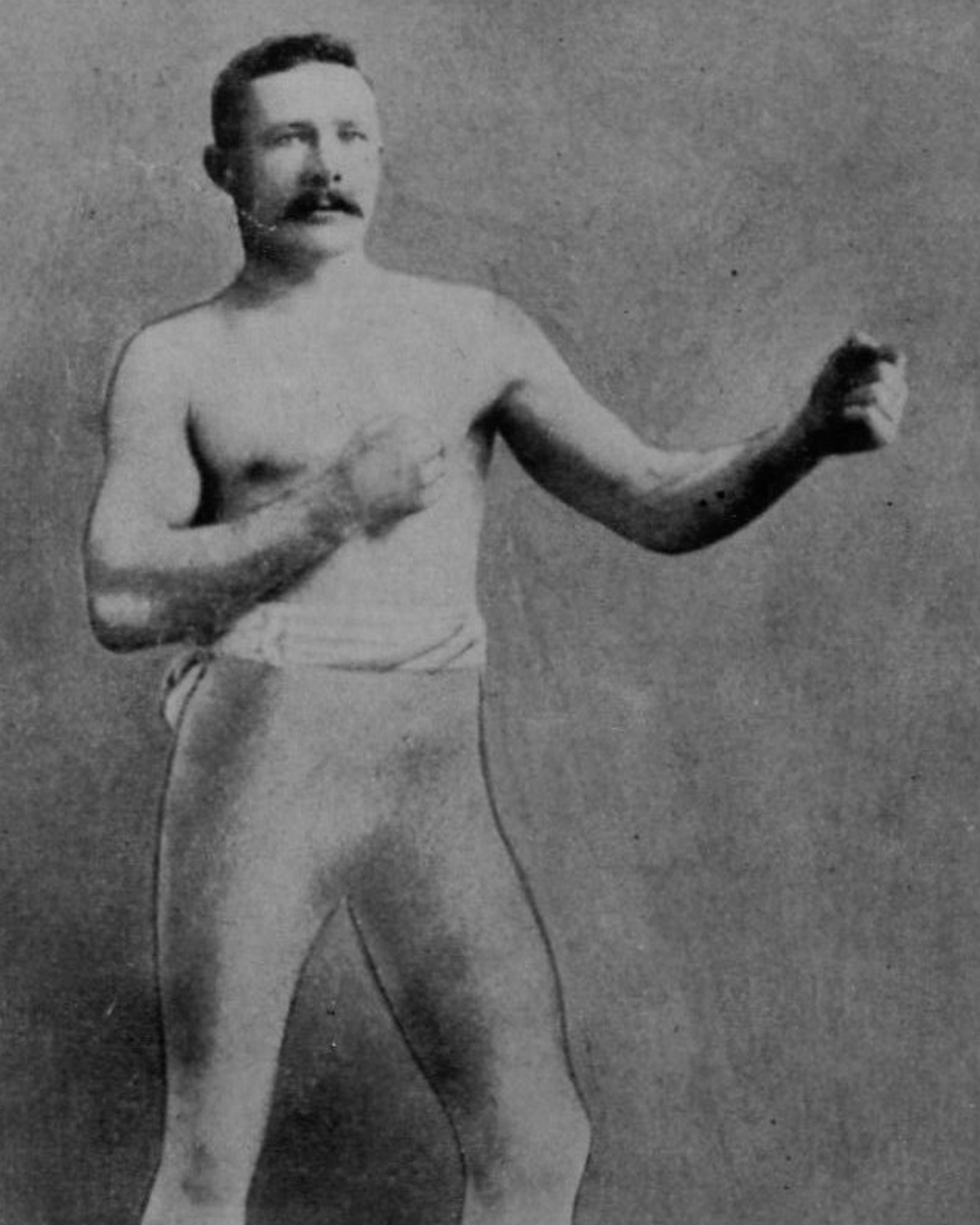

Personal information
- Nicknames: The Wild Man; The Barrier Champion
- Nationality: Australian
- Born: Joseph John Goddard; 25 November 1857 Pyramul, Colony of New South Wales
- Died: 21 January 1903 (aged 45) Philadelphia, New Jersey, U.S.
- Height: 183 cm (6 ft 0 in)
- Weight: Heavyweight

Boxing career
- Reach: 72 in (183 cm)
- Stance: Orthodox

Boxing record
- Total fights: 58
- Wins: 32
- Win by KO: 30
- Losses: 15
- Draws: 7

Joe Goddard (25 November 1857 – 21 January 1903) was an Australian boxer known for his great strength, durability, and punching power. He stood 6' 0" (185 cm) and weighed 12 stone 12 lbs to 14 stone 4 lbs (180–200 pounds, 82–91 kg).

He was one of the first reported Heavyweight Champions of Australia. Among the men he defeated were Joe Choynski, Peter Maher, and "Denver" Ed Smith. His (incomplete) record comes out to: 28 wins (22 by knockout), 12 losses, 8 draws, and 6 no decisions.

Goddard was shot in the head by a police constable whom he had attacked with a baseball bat during a fight at the Republican primaries in Pennsauken Township, Philadelphia, New Jersey in July 1902. After spending two months in hospital he recovered sufficiently to be released with the bullet still in his head, only to be arrested for having assaulted the constable and imprisoned when unable to put up $1,000 bail. He was said to have lost his sanity a few days later and transferred to Blackwood Insane Asylum, residing there until December, when he was taken to Cooper Hospital, where he died on 21 January 1903. His body was donated to the Philadelphia Medical College for scientific research.

Goddard was the 2006 Inductee for the Australian National Boxing Hall of Fame Pioneers category.

== Professional boxing record ==
33 Wins (27 Knockouts), 18 Defeats (7 Knockouts), 12 Draws, 2 No Contests
Res.	Record	Opponent	Type	Rd., Time	Date	Location	Notes
Win	debut	Australia Ned Ryan	KO	3	1889-04-04	Australia Melbourne, Victoria	
Win	0-1-0	Australia Burridge	NWS		1889-04-13	Australia Foley's Hall, Sydney, New South Wales	
Win	debut	Australia Harry Mullins	KO	1	1889-08-31	Australia Apollo Athletics Hall, Melbourne, Victoria	
Win	1-0-1	Australia Owen Sullivan	KO	11	1889-09-30	Australia Hamilton Hall, Broken Hill, New South Wales	
Win	7-5-7	Australia Jim Fogarty	TKO	4	1889-11-09	Australia Apollo Athletics Hall, Melbourne, Victoria	
Win	1-2-0	Australia Billy Buck	TKO	4	1889-11-09	Australia Apollo Athletics Hall, Melbourne, Victoria	
Win	2-1-1	Australia Charlie Dunn	KO	14	1889-11-25	Australia Athletic Hall, Broken Hill, New South Wales	
Draw	1-1-1	Australia Owen Sullivan	PTS	10	1889-12-23	Australia Stewart's Athletic Hall, Adelaide, South Australia	
Win	4-2-3	Australia Jack Morris	KO	2	1890-03-01	Australia Apollo Athletic Hall, Melbourne, Victoria	
Win	1-2-0	Australia Jim Church	KO		1890-05-17	Australia Crystal Palace, Richmond, Melbourne, Victoria	
Win	debut	Australia Arthur Hayes	KO		1890-05-19	Australia Crystal Palace, Richmond, Melbourne, Victoria	
Win	2-3-2	Australia Luke Keegan	PTS	8	1890-06-02	Australia Crystal Palace, Richmond, Melbourne, Victoria	
Win	15-5-3	Australia Mick Dooley	RTD	21	1890-06-24	Australia Sydney Amateur Gymnastic Club, Sydney, New South Wales	vacant Australian heavyweight title
Loss	debut	Australia W.H. Watson	PTS	3	1890-08-23	Australia Melbourne Athletic Club, Melbourne, Victoria	
Draw	40-3-2	Australia Peter Jackson	PTS	8	1890-10-20	Australia Crystal Palace, Richmond, Melbourne, Victoria	Australian heavyweight title Commonwealth (British Empire) heavyweight title
Win	15-6-3	Australia Mick Dooley	KO	7	1890-11-01	Australia Melbourne Athletic Club, Melbourne, Victoria	Australian heavyweight title
Draw	15-7-3	Australia Mick Dooley	NWS		1890-11-11	Australia Apollo Athletic Hall, Melbourne, Victoria	
Win	debut	Australia Bill Curran	KO	3	1890-11-15	Australia Melbourne Athletic Club, Melbourne, Victoria	
Win	5-1-0	USA Joe Choynski	KO	4	1891-02-10	Australia Sydney Amateur Gymnastic Club, Sydney, New South Wales	Australian heavyweight title
Draw	15-7-3	Australia Mick Dooley	NWS		1891-04-11	Australia Gaiety Theatre, Sydney, New South Wales	
Win	10-4-8	Australia Bill McCarthy	RTD	6	1891-05-04	Australia O'Bierne's Athletic Hall, Broken Hill, New South Wales	
Win	14-7-2	Australia Tom Lees	TKO	9	1891-05-26	Australia Skating Rink, Charters Towers, Queensland	
Win	7-2-0	USA Joe Choynski	KO	4	1891-07-20	Australia Melbourne Athletic Club, Melbourne, Victoria	Australian heavyweight title
Draw	14-8-2	Australia Tom Lees	PTS	8	1891-09-21	Australia Crystal Palace, Richmond, Melbourne, Victoria	
Win	18-2-8	Australia Jack Ashton	PTS	8	1891-10-02	Australia Crystal Palace, Richmond, Melbourne, Victoria	
Win	3-1-0	Australia Ned Ryan	KO	5	1892-01-02	Australia Melbourne Athletic Club, Melbourne, Victoria	
Win	13-3-0	USA Joe McAuliffe	KO	15	1892-06-30	USA Pacific A.C., San Francisco, California	
Draw	16-11-9	USA Billy Smith	PTS	8	1892-08-25	USA California A.C., San Francisco, California	
Win	debut	USA Tom Moore	KO	2	1892-09-13	USA Miner's Bowery Theatre, New York	
Win	debut	USA Dick Wiley	TKO	1	1892-09-19	USA Ariel A.C., Philadelphia, Pennsylvania	
NC	9-0-0	USA Joe Butler	NC	3	1892-09-21	USA Ariel A.C., Philadelphia, Pennsylvania	
NC	1-3-1	USA Mike Brennan	ND	4	1892-09-24	USA Ariel A.C., Philadelphia, Pennsylvania	
Win	50-3-0	USA Peter Maher	KO	3	1892-12-08	USA Coney Island A.C., Brooklyn, New York	
Loss	30-5-3	Denver Ed Smith	KO	18	1893-03-03	USA Olympic A.C., New Orleans, Louisiana	
Win	debut	USA Willis Kennedy	KO	2	1893-06-12	USA Columbian A.C., Roby, Indiana	
Loss	31-1-5	New Zealand Harry Laing	TKO	12	1894-01-01	Australia Athletic Hall, Melbourne, Victoria	Australian heavyweight title
Win	5-4-1	Australia Jim Quigley	KO	2	1894-10-22	Australia Cumberland Athletic Club, Melbourne, Victoria	
Loss	6-0-0	Australia Peter Felix	PTS	10	1895-03-04	Australia Victoria Hall, Melbourne, Victoria	
Draw	15-3-10	Australia Tut Ryan	PTS	15	1895-05-06	Australia Victoria Hall, Melbourne, Victoria	
Win	4-3-4	Australia Dan Keely	KO	2	1895-05-25	Australia Mick Nathan's Athletic Hall, Melbourne, Victoria	
Win	0-1-0	Australia Bill Curran	KO	3	1895-06-08	Australia Mick Nathan's Athletic Hall, Melbourne, Victoria	
Win	22-14"-7	Australia Edward Starlight Rollins	TKO	5	1895-06-22	Australia Mick Nathan's Athletic Hall, Melbourne, Victoria	
Win	5-4-2	Australia Owen Sullivan	KO	9	1895-08-31	South Africa The Amphitheatre, Johannesburg, Gauteng	
Draw	15-3-11	Australia Tut Ryan	PTS	13	1895-11-23	South Africa The Amphitheatre, Johannesburg, Gauteng	South African heavyweight title
Win	35-5-4	USA Denver Ed Smith	KO	4	1896-11-07	South Africa The Amphitheatre, Johannesburg, Gauteng	South African heavyweight title
Win	18-11-3	Australia Mick Dooley	KO	2	1897-02-06	South Africa The Amphitheatre, Johannesburg, Gauteng	South African heavyweight title
Draw	15-3-12	Australia Tut Ryan	PTS	20	1897-06-05	South Africa The Amphitheatre, Johannesburg, Gauteng	South African heavyweight title
Loss	25-1-5	USA Tom Sharkey	KO	6	1897-11-18	USA Mechanic's Pavilion, San Francisco, California	
Loss	4-1-2	USA Theodore Van Buskirk	PTS	8	1898-01-08	USA Marysville, California	
Loss	5-0-2	USA James J. Jeffries	TKO	3	1898-02-28	USA Hazard's Pavilion, Los Angeles, California	
Win	112-5-3	USA Peter Meher	KO	1	1898-05-13	USA Arena A.C., Philadelphia, Pennsylvania	
Loss	112-6-3	USA Peter Meyer	RTD	8	1898-07-08	USA Lenox A.C., New York, New York	
Draw	10-6-4	USA Bob Armstrong	NWS	6	1898-08-29	USA Arena A.C., Philadelphia, Pennsylvania	
Loss	35-6-4	USA Joe Choynski	NWS	6	1898-09-12	USA Arena A.C., Philadelphia, Pennsylvania	
Loss	15-4-1	USA Gus Ruhlin	NWS	6	1898-10-14	USA Arena A.C., Philadelphia, Pennsylvania	
Draw	5-7-1	USA Jack McCormick	NWS	6	1898-11-12	USA Nonpareil A.C., Philadelphia, Pennsylvania	
Loss	46-2-7	USA Kid McCoy	DQ	5	1898-12-16	USA Arena A.C., Philadelphia, Pennsylvania	
Loss	16-4-1	USA Gus Ruhlin	DQ	5	1899-03-07	USA Lenox A.C., New York, New York	
Loss	9-2-0	USA Klondike Haynes	DQ	5	1899-06-21	USA Adelphi Theater, Chicago, Illinois	
Loss	14-5-0	USA Charley Stevenson	TKO	4	1899-11-07	USA Nonpareil A.C., Philadelphia, Pennsylvania	
Loss	8-11-2	USA Jack McCormick	KO	2	1899-11-25	Canada Crescent A.C., Toronto, Ontario	
Loss	30-3-6	USA Tom Sharkey	TKO	4	1900-02-13	USA Industrial Hall, Philadelphia, Pennsylvania	
Draw	16-5-1	USA Klondike Haynes	NWS	6	1900-11-06	USA Star Theater, Philadelphia, Pennsylvania	
Loss	10-5-0	USA Jim Jeffords	NWS	6	1901-07-04	USA Lancaster, Pennsylvania	
Loss	25-8-6	USA George Cole	DQ	5	1902-04-24	USA Broadway A.C., Philadelphia, Pennsylvania	
