= Rocks Push =

Late-19th century gang in Sydney, Australia

- Founding location: The Rocks, Sydney, New South Wales
- Years active: 1870s – 1890s
- Membership: Larrikin gang
- Allies: Miller's Point Push; Straw Hat Push; Glebe Push; Argyle Cut Push; Forty Thieves; Gibb Street Mob
- Notable members: Larry Foley

The Rocks Push was a notorious larrikin gang, which dominated The Rocks area of Sydney from the 1870s to the end of the 1890s. In its day it was referred to as The Push, a title which has since come to be more widely used for cliques in general and the left-wing movement the Sydney Push.

== Activities ==
The gang was engaged in running warfare with other larrikin gangs of the time such as the Miller's Point Push, Straw Hat Push, the Glebe Push, the Argyle Cut Push, the Forty Thieves from Surry Hills, and the Gibb Street Mob. They conducted such crimes as theft, murder, assault and battery against police and pedestrians in The Rocks area. Female members of the Push would entice drunks and seamen into dark areas to be murdered or assaulted and robbed by the gang.

The leaders of the Rocks Push were crowned through victory in bare-knuckle boxing matches. Larry Foley, later to be regarded as the 'Father of Australian Boxing', was the leader of a Roman Catholic larrikin gang known as the Greens. On 18 March 1871, at the age of twenty-one, Foley fought Sandy Ross, leader of the 'Orange' or Protestant group. The fight lasted 71 rounds before police intervened.

== The Push Dress ==
The Rocks push had a strict dress style to make victims feel more at ease in their presence. Gang members would wear tailored jackets and dress pants with expensive hats and shoes. Banjo Patterson describes;

“black bell-bottomed pants, no waistcoat, very short black paget coat, white shirt with no collar, and a gaudy neckerchief round the bare throat. Their boots were marvels, very high in the heel and picked out with all sorts of colours down the sides.”

This dress style would show the general public and the members' victims that they had no swords or guns on hand. They would have a razor blade stuck to the toe of their boot and hidden in the band of their hat for attacks instead.

== References in literature ==
Australian authors of the time mentioned the Push in various of their works. A poem called The Bastard from the Bush, attributed to Henry Lawson, and a sanitised published version, The Captain of the Push, describe in vivid and colourful language a meeting between a Push leader and a "stranger from the bush":

Would you dong a bloody copper if you caught the cunt alone,
Would you stoush a swell or Chinkee, split his garret with a stone?
Would you have a moll to keep you, would you swear off work for good?
What? Live on prostitution? My colonial oath I would!

Another contemporary poet, Banjo Paterson, describes a group of tourists who go to visit the Rocks Push, and paints the following picture of the appearance of the gang members:

Wiry, hard-faced little fellows, for the most part, with scarcely a sizeable man amongst them. They were all clothed in “push” evening dress—black bell-bottomed pants, no waistcoat, very short black paget coat, white shirt with no collar, and a gaudy neckerchief round the bare throat. Their boots were marvels, very high in the heel and picked out with all sorts of colours down the sides.

Paterson also said, addressing Lawson in In Defence of the Bush,

Did you hear no sweeter voices in the music of the bush
Than the roar of trams and 'buses, and the war-whoop of "the push"?
Did the magpies rouse your slumbers with their carol sweet and strange?
Did you hear the silver chiming of the bell-birds on the range?
But, perchance, the wild birds' music by your senses was despised,
For you say you'll stay in townships till the bush is civilised.
Would you make it a tea-garden and on Sundays have a band
Where the "blokes" might take their "donahs", with a "public" close at hand?
You had better stick to Sydney and make merry with the "push",
For the bush will never suit you, and you'll never suit the bush.

== The Suez Canal ==
One of the most famous haunts of the Rocks Push was Harrington Place, also known as the "Suez Canal" (named after the Suez Canal in Egypt, due to the passageway saving a walk around the buildings of The Rocks, just as the Suez Canal did for ships in Egypt.), one of the most unsavoury places in Sydney in its time, due to the Rocks Push. The canal was used to transport waste to the harbor. In the early hours of the morning (around 00:00-04:00), Push members would employ a prostitute from one of the bars on Harrington Street to bed a young sailor, then move towards the canal for an intimate moment. The Push members' dress was not intimidating, but they were to keep a razor blade in the band of their hat, and attached to the toe of their shoe. The members would have the prostitute (aka. 'Donah') lean against the wall of the passage with the sailor facing her. A member would then walk out of the shadows and use the razor on his boot's toe to slice the sailor's Achilles tendon, rendering the sailor in too much pain to move. The push member would then slice his throat using the razor from his hat, and the member and the Donah were to share the winnings. The body would get pushed down the canal into the harbor with the waste, and a ferryman would fish bodies out come morning.

Further information about similar events is provided in the famous Rocks Ghost tours, as a majority of related stories are passed down from generations.

== See also ==
- Mount Rennie rape case
