= List of Australian heavyweight boxing champions =

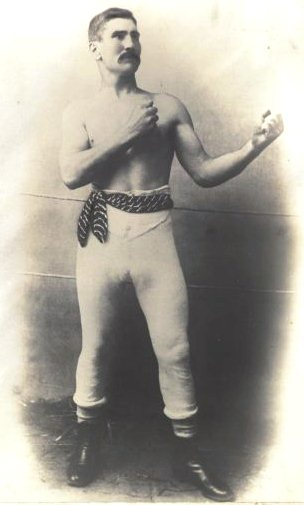
Bill Farnan was a foundry worker who fought Peter Jackson in the first Australian heavyweight contest using Marquis of Queensbury rules in Melbourne on 26 July 1884. He hit Jackson hard "between wind and water" in the second round and continuing body hits drove Jackson down and out in the third round.

This list of Australian heavyweight boxing champions is a table showing the boxers who have won the Australian professional heavyweight championship. The title has been administered by the Australian National Boxing Federation (previously the Australian Boxing Federation) since 1965, and prior to that by Stadiums Limited.

A champion will often voluntarily relinquish the title in order to fight for a higher-ranked championship, such as the world. Where the date on which a champion relinquished the title is unclear, the date of his final defence is shown.

^{r} – Champion relinquished title.
^{s} – Champion stripped of title.
^{i} – Interim Champion of title.

Name	Duration of reign	Defences
William Miller	28 May 1883	0
Bill Farnan	26 July 1884 – 20 May 1885	2
Tom Lees	20 May 1885 – 25 September 1886	3
Peter Jackson	25 September 1886^{r}	
Frank Slavin	8 December 1888^{r}	
Joe Goddard	24 June 1890^{r}	
Owen Sullivan	25 August 1890^{r}	
Joe Goddard	1 November 1890 – 20 July 1891^{r}	2
Harry Laing	1 January 1894^{r}	
Mick Dooley	23 June 1894 – 10 July 1897	3
Peter Felix	10 July 1897 – 8 October 1898	1
Tut Ryan	8 October 1898^{r}	
Bill Doherty	25 February 1899 – 2 December 1899	4
Peter Felix	2 December 1899 – 16 July 1900	1
Bill Doherty	16 July 1900 – 19 June 1901	3
Tut Ryan	19 June 1901 – 19 June 1901	2
Bill Doherty	19 June 1901 – 13 October 1902	3
Bill Squires	13 October 1902 – 5 May 1903^{r}	2
Peter Felix	22 September 1903 – 27 September 1904	2
Arthur Cripps	27 September 1904^{r}	
Bill Squires	5 June 1905 – 9 September 1905	1
Tim Draffin Murphy	9 September 1905 – 28 April 1906	1
Bill Squires	28 April 1906 – 22 December 1906^{r}	3
Jim Griffin	15 April 1907^{r}	
Bill Lang	3 October 1907 – 11 April 1910	11
Tommy Burns	11 April 1910^{r}	
Bill Turner	15 August 1910^{r}	
Bill Lang	13 May 1911 – 9 September 1911	2
Jack Lester	9 September 1911 – 30 September 1911	1
Sam McVea	30 September 1911 – 8 April 1912	4
Sam Langford	8 April 1912 – 19 June 1913^{r}	4
Dave Smith	5 November 1913 – 1 August 1914	2
Jimmy Clabby	1 August 1914 – 12 August 1914	1
Dave Smith	12 August 1914–13 February 1915^{r}	1
Harold Hardwick	6 March 1915 – 19 February 1916	1
Les Darcy	19 February 1916–16 August 1916^{r}	3
Dave Smith	26 December 1916 – 26 May 1917	2
Jimmy Clabby	26 May 1917 – 1 January 1918	4
Albert Kid Lloyd	1 January 1918 – 22 March 1918	2
Ern Waddy	1918–15 February 1919^{r}	2
Albert Kid Lloyd	1 March 1919 – 21 February 1920	6
George Cook	21 February 1920^{r}	
Billy Shade	7 May 1921^{r}	
Ern Waddy	7 May 1921 – 8 September 1921	1
Albert Kid Lloyd	8 September 1921^{r}	
Colin Bell	17 March 1922–24 February 1923	2
Jim Roland Dwyer	24 February 1923–30 April 1923	2
Ern Waddy	30 April 1923 – 8 September 1923	3
George "Blackie" Miller	8 September 1923 – 26 April 1924	1
Ern Waddy	26 April 1924 – 12 July 1926	5
Ern Sheppeard	12 July 1926 – 22 October 1926	1
George Thompson	22 October 1926 – 18 December 1926	1
Tiger Jack Payne	18 December 1926 – 27 December 1926	1
George Cook	27 December 1926^{r}	
George Thompson	18 June 1927 – 2 July 1927	1
Tiger Jack Payne	2 July 1927 – 7 April 1928^{r}	1
Dom McLeod	31 July 1929 – 9 November 1929	1
Fred Young	9 November 1929^{r}	
George Thompson	16 November 1929–4 July 1930^{r}	3
Jack O'Malley	7 March 1931 – 5 February 1932	2
Ambrose Palmer	5 February 1932^{r}	
Ron Richards	19 August 1936 – 12 April 1938	2
Ambrose Palmer	12 April 1938^{r}	
Ron Richards	4 June 1938 – 12 September 1940^{r}	2
Billy "Wokko" Britt	5 May 1941 – 23 October 1941	3
Ron Richards	23 October 1941^{r}	
Billy "Wokko" Britt	7 November 1942 – 3 April 1943	1
Herb Narvo	3 April 1943 – 24 November 1945	3
Jack Johnson	24 November 1945 – 2 March 1946^{r}	1
Herb Narvo	2 March 1946 – 6 April 1946	1
Jack Johnson	6 April 1946 – 26 June 1948^{r}	4
Dave Sands	4 September 1950 – 11 August 1952^{died}	1
Ken Brady	29 May 1953 – 26 May 1955	3
Allen Williams	26 May 1955 – 30 November 1959	10
Steve Raduly	30 November 1959 – 24 June 1960^{r}	3
Tony Vickers	18 August 1961 – 5 October 1964	3
Ron Fritzsche	5 October 1964 – 14 December 1964	1
Peter Leaney	14 December 1964 – 28 May 1965	2
Fred Casey	28 May 1965 – 17 September 1965^{r}	1
Dave Cullen	15 April 1967^{r}	
Fred Casey	25 October 1968 – 29 September 1969	1
Bob Dunlop	29 September 1969^{r}	
Foster Bibron	22 May 1970 – 25 February 1972	1
Tony Mundine	25 February 1972^{r}	
Steve Aczel	26 June 1975 – 10 November 1976	2
Maile Haumona	10 November 1976 – 5 December 1977	2
Tony Mundine	5 December 1977 – 24 July 1981^{r}	3
Steve Aczel	14 July 1984 – 15 February 1985	1
Dave Russell	15 February 1985 – 13 March 1986	1
Dean Waters	13 March 1986 – 2 December 1988^{r}	1
Craig Petersen	14 November 1991 – 14 June 1992	1
Jimmy Thunder	14 June 1992 – 18 March 1994^{r}	1
Vince Cervi	26 March 1995 – 22 September 1995	1
Joe Bugner	22 September 1995^{r}	1
Colin Wilson	17 February 1997 – 31 January 1998	1
Joe Bugner	31 January 1998 – 20 April 1998^{r}	1
Bob Mirovic	5 September 1998 – 25 June 1999	2
Kali Meehan	25 June 1999 – 7 July 2000^{r}	2
Nathan Briggs	25 May 2001 – 8 July 2001	1
Bob Mirovic	8 July 2001 – 7 March 2003^{r}	5
Colin Wilson	19 September 2003 – 2 November 2007	5
Bob Mirovic	2 November 2007 – 10 September 2008	1
John Hopoate	10 September 2008 – 3 October 2009	3
Colin Wilson	3 October 2009 – 20 August 2010	1
Justin Whitehead	20 August 2010^{r}	
Michael Kirby	7 October 2011^{r}	
Lucas Browne	17 February 2012^{r}	
Solomon Haumono	7 September 2012^{r}	
Hunter Sam	13 December 2013^{s}	
Ben Edwards	27 February 2015 – 11 July 2015	1
Peter Graham	11 July 2015^{r}	
Willie Nasio	27 February 2016 – 6 October 2017	2
Demsey McKean (Note: McKean won the Interim title in March 2017, defeated Nasio to become the unified champion.)	24 March 2017^{r}	1
Faiga Opelu	November 2019 - 22 October 2020	1
Justis Huni	22 October 2020 – present	3

== See also ==
- List of Australian female boxing champions
- List of Australian cruiserweight boxing champions
- List of Australian middleweight boxing champions
- Boxing in Australia
