= Albert 'Kid' Lloyd =

Albert Francis Lloyd
Statistics
Nickname(s)	The Kid
Weight(s)	Heavyweight
Height	5 ft 10 in (178 cm)
Reach	72 in (180 cm)
Born	March 25, 1892 Melbourne, Victoria, Australia
Stance	Orthodox
Boxing record
Total fights	125
Wins	83
Wins by KO	47
Losses	33

Albert Francis 'Kid' Lloyd, born 25 March 1891 in Melbourne, was an Australian former professional boxer. He was nicknamed "The Kid" and was a three-time Australian heavyweight boxing champion, competing between the years from 1912 and 1926.

== Early life and amateur career ==
He was born the son of Phoebe Lloyd in the suburb of Carlton, in Melbourne, Victoria, without a father mentioned on his birth certificate.

== Professional career ==
He stood at 178 cm (5 ft 10 in) tall, weighed around 79.5 kg (175 lb), and fought from an orthodox stance. His career started in the bush when he was a teenager. He was first noticed when he won a heavyweight tournament in 1912. Lloyd fought all over Australia in search of bouts, including unofficial fights in the Snowy Flynn travelling boxing troupe. He first won the Australian heavyweight title with a second-round KO over Colin Bell on the 24th March 1917 at the Sydney Stadium, but lost the title three weeks later on points against Les Darcy's former tutor Dave Smith at Sydney Stadium. He then recorded wins against Americans Eddie McGoorty (W 20), and Fritz Holland (W KO 8).

After two unsuccessful challenges against Jimmy Clabby (D 20 & L 20), Lloyd eventually won the title back on the third try, with a points win over Clabby (W 20), on New Years Day, 1 January 1918, again held at Sydney Stadium. He held the title for over two years with successful defences against George Cook three times, Ern Waddy three times and Clabby once. Lloyd was then stripped of his title when he travelled to New Zealand for a series of bouts against Waddy, Cook and Clabby. Eventually in 1921, Lloyd travelled to fight in Great Britain and Europe with fellow Aussies George Cook and Middleweight Frankie Burns. He stayed there for two years, participating in 32 bouts, for 17 wins, 13 losses and 2 draws.

While in Great Britain and Europe, his fights included wins over Horace 'Soldier' Jones (WF 10), Phil Suffling (W KO 3) and Phil Scott (W KO 3), while he lost to 'Bombardier' Billy Wells (L KO 10), Jack Bloomfield (L KO 6) and Gipsy Daniels (L 20). He then returned to Australia fighting anywhere and everywhere, and unsuccessfully challenged Waddy for the Australian title twice.

Record: 125 fights, 83 Wins (47 KO), 33 Losses, 8 Draws.

== Personal life ==
Little is known of Lloyd's personal life. After he retired from boxing, he became a barman at the famous Melbourne Hotel, Young & Jackson's on Swanston Street. He died on 6 September 1959.

== See also ==
- List of Australian heavyweight boxing champions
