= Richard Towers =

British heavyweight boxer (born 1979)

Personal information
- Nickname: The Inferno
- Nationality: English
- Born: Richard Towers; 8 August 1979 (age 47) Sheffield, Yorkshire, England
- Height: 6 ft 8 in (2.03 m)
- Weight: Heavyweight

Boxing career
- Stance: Orthodox

Boxing record
- Total fights: 16
- Wins: 15
- Win by KO: 13
- Losses: 1

Richard Towers (born Richard Hayles on 8 August 1979) is a British former professional boxer who competed from 2009 to 2013.

== Amateur career ==
Towers has won all but one of his amateur fights whilst waiting to get a professional licence. The licence could not be granted until he finished his probationary period.

== Professional career ==
Towers turned professional on 13 June 2009, scoring a points victory against Chris Woollas. The following month Towers scored another points victory in his second bout against Howard Daley. Towers scored his first stoppage victory in a rematch with Chris Woollas, the referee ended the fight in the second round after Woollas was knocked down for a third time. Towers fought in another three bouts in 2009, against Michal Skierniewski, Jason Callum and Lee Mountford, winning all within the scheduled rounds.

Towers managed routine knockout victories over Yavor Marinchev and Ladislav Kovarik.

== Legal issues ==
Richard Towers (then known as Hayles) was sentenced for 13 years of prison time after being part of a gang which inflicted three days of agony on a man who was held at gunpoint, and tortured with a steam iron, hammer and stun gun. He played no part in the man's ordeal but was involved in the kidnap which led to a £150,000 ransom demand. Towers served six and a half years before his release.

In September 2025, Towers, whose real name is Richard Hayles, was sentenced to three years and three months in prison after pleading guilty at Sheffield Crown Court to coercive and controlling behaviour against a former partner.

The court heard that during their 18-month relationship, Hayles subjected his partner to a sustained campaign of emotional abuse. Prosecutors said he repeatedly belittled her with comments about her mental health and appearance, told her she was "only good for sex", and insisted no one would want a woman with children. He was also described as controlling "every aspect of the household", including food, sleep, and daily routines.

Hayles made his partner grade herself on "how a woman should be" and watch online content promoting traditional gender roles, including videos by Kevin Samuels. One of her children reported that Hayles had also made them listen to Andrew Tate, verbally abused them, and threatened to shoot them if they defended their mother. The child described creating a "secret code" with their mother to communicate during periods of abuse.

The abuse left the victim in debt and resulted in the loss of her home in Rotherham. In a statement read to the court, she called Hayles an "evil, manipulating bully" and said his actions had stripped her of her confidence and self-worth. Judge Jeremy Richardson KC described the case as "serious" and said Hayles had engaged in a "catalogue of acts" designed to belittle and control his partner and, to an extent, her child.

At the time of the offence, Hayles was already serving a suspended sentence for a firearms offence. He also had previous convictions, including for his involvement in the 2001 kidnap and torture of a man for ransom. In addition to the prison sentence, he was made subject to a 10-year restraining order.

== Professional boxing record ==
16 fights	15 wins	1 loss
By knockout	12	1
By decision	3	0

No.	Result	Record	Opponent	Type	Round, time	Date	Location	Notes
16	Win	15–1	Hrvoje Kisicek	TKO	6 (6), 2:27	29 Nov 2014	York Hall, London, England	
15	Loss	14–1	Lucas Browne	TKO	5 (12), 0:51	2 Nov 2013	Hull Arena, Hull, England	
14	Win	14–0	Gregory Tony	TKO	9 (12), 0:48	16 Jun 2012	Manchester Velodrome, Manchester, England	Won vacant European Union heavyweight title
13	Win	13–0	Harold Sconiers	TKO	5 (8), 0:27	24 Mar 2012	Ponds Forge, Sheffield, England	
12	Win	12–0	Yuri Bihoutseu	TKO	3 (8), 2:28	24 Sep 2011	Ponds Forge, Sheffield, England	
11	Win	11–0	Ismail Abdoul	PTS	8	25 Jun 2011	Hillsborough Leisure Centre, Sheffield, England	
10	Win	10–0	Raman Sukhaterin	RTD	4 (6), 3:00	16 Apr 2011	MEN Arena, Manchester, England	
9	Win	9–0	Daniel Bispo	TKO	2 (6), 2:51	26 Feb 2011	De Vere Whites Hotel, Bolton, England	
8	Win	8–0	Ladislav Kovarik	TKO	1 (6), 2:01	21 May 2010	Ponds Forge, Sheffield, England	
7	Win	7–0	Yavor Marinchev	TKO	2 (6), 2:27	16 Apr 2010	Robin Park Arena, Wigan, England	
6	Win	6–0	Lee Mountford	TKO	1 (6)	20 Dec 2009	Octagon Centre, Sheffield, England	
5	Win	5–0	Jason Callum	RTD	3 (6), 3:00	24 Oct 2009	City Hall, Sheffield, England	
4	Win	4–0	Michal Skierniewski	RTD	2 (4), 3:00	3 Oct 2009	Leisure Centre, Altrincham, England	
3	Win	3–0	Chris Woollas	TKO	2 (4), 1:28	5 Sep 2009	Colosseum, Watford, England	
2	Win	2–0	Howard Daley	PTS	4	18 Jul 2009	MEN Arena, Manchester, England	
1	Win	1–0	Chris Woollas	PTS	4	13 Jun 2009	Robin Park Arena, Wigan, England	
