= Jim Farnan =

Australian rules footballer

Personal information
- Full name: James Thomas Farnan
- Born: 12 July 1875; Emerald Hill
- Died: 9 August 1916 (aged 41); France
- Original team: Montague (MJFA)

Playing career^{1}
Years	Club	Games (Goals)
1899	St Kilda	1 (0)
- ^{1} Playing statistics correct to the end of 1899.

James Thomas Farnan (12 July 1875 – 9 August 1916) was an Australian rules footballer who played with St Kilda in the Victorian Football League (VFL). He was killed in action in France in World War I.

== Family ==
One of the five children of the Australian (bare-knuckle) heavyweight boxing champion, William Francis "Billy" Farnan (1851–1891), and Bridget Winifred Farnan (1853–1912), née Kane, James Thomas Farnan was born at Emerald Hill (now known as South Melbourne) on 12 July 1875.

== Footballer ==
Recruited from Montague, he played one senior game for St Kilda, on the half-back flank, against Essendon, at the East Melbourne Cricket Ground on 8 July 1899 (round nine). Essendon won by 79 points, 11.19 (85) to 1.0 (6) (St Kilda did not score at all in the last three-quarters).

== Military service ==
He enlisted, aged 40, in the First AIF on 7 August 1915. He gave his occupation as packer and his status as single.

== Death ==
Private James Farnan, of the 46th Battalion Australian Infantry was killed in action, in France, on 9 August 1916.

He was buried at the Pozieres British Cemetery, at Ovillers-la-Boisselle, in France. His name is located at panel 141 in the Commemorative Area at the Australian War Memorial.

== See also ==
- List of Victorian Football League players who died on active service
