= Colin Wilson (boxer) =

Australian heavyweight boxer (1972–2026)

Personal information
- Nickname: Kid Coalminer
- Nationality: Australian
- Born: 18 April 1972 Palmerston North, New Zealand
- Died: 5 October 2026 (aged 54)
- Height: 1.95 m (6 ft 5 in)
- Weight: Heavyweight

Boxing career
- Reach: 200 cm (79 in)
- Stance: Southpaw

Boxing record
- Total fights: 70
- Wins: 35
- Win by KO: 21
- Losses: 33
- Draws: 1
- No contests: 1

Colin Wilson (18 April 1972 – 5 October 2026) was an Australian heavyweight boxer who held the Australian heavyweight boxing title 17 February 1997 – 31 January 1998, 19 September 2003 – 2 November 2007, and 3 October 2009 – 20 August 2010, losing the last to 39-year-old Justin Whitehead. Wilson debuted against Jason Coaker on 13 November 1992, winning by knockout, his first of more than 20 such wins. Wilson fought for many years in Fred Brophy's Boxing Troupe, the last Tent Boxing Show in the entire World, under the name, The Birdsville Butcher.

Wilson died on 5 October 2026, at the age of 54, eight months after being hospitalised with a brain tumour.

== See also ==
- List of Australian heavyweight boxing champions
