= Tom Lees (boxer) =

Australian boxer

Personal information
- Nationality: Australian
- Born: Thomas James Lees; 16 June 1858 Tamworth, New South Wales, Australia
- Died: 11 July 1947 (aged 89)
- Height: 182 cm (6 ft 0 in)
- Weight: Heavyweight

Boxing career

Boxing record
- Total fights: 48
- Wins: 17
- Win by KO: 10
- Losses: 12
- Draws: 5
- No contests: 14

Thomas James Lees (16 June 1858 – 11 July 1947) was an Australian boxer and the second reported person to hold the title Heavyweight Champion of Australia, from May 1885 to September 1886.

During a long career in boxing he fought bouts in South Africa, USA, Canada and the UK as well as in Australasia. "He won and held the Australian championship against some of the best men in the world," including such famous heavyweight boxers as Peter Jackson, Joe Goddard and Bob Fitzsimmons. His record comes to: 16 wins (9 by knockout), 10 losses, 5 draws and 13 no decisions.

== Professional boxing record ==
17 Wins (10 Knockouts), 12 Defeats (3 Knockouts), 5 Draws, 14 No Contests
| Res. | Record | Opponent | Type | Rd., Time | Date | Location | Notes |
| NC | 1-0-1 | Australia Peter Jackson | ND | 6 | 1884-01-28 | Australia Academy of Music, Sydney, New South Wales | |
| Loss | —N/a | Australia George Seale | PTS | 6 | 1884-01028 | Australia Academy of Music, Sydney, New South Wales | |
| Loss | 2-0-1 | Australia Peter Jackson | PTS | 4 | 1884-01-31 | Australia Academy of Music, Sydney, New South Wales | |
| NC | 3-0-1 | Australia Peter Jackson | ND | 4 | 1884-02-02 | Australia Academy of Music, Sydney, New South Wales | |
| Win | —N/a | Australia S. Cribbe | KO | 6 | 1884-04-26 | Australia Orange, New South Wales | |
| NC | —N/a | Australia Key | ND | 3 | 1884-09-13 | Australia Victoria Hall, Melbourne, Victoria | |
| Win | —N/a | Australia O'Brien | KO | 2 | 1884-11-23 | Australia Lyceum Hall, Melbourne, Victoria | |
| Win | 0-2-1 | Australia Dick Atkinson | KO | 11 | 1885-02-02 | Australia Melbourne, Victoria | |
| Draw | 7-0-1 | Australia Bill Farnan | PTS | 3 | 1885-02-07 | Australia Victoria Hall, Melbourne, Victoria | |
| Win | 7-0-2 | Australia Bill Farnan | KO | 12 | 1885-05-20 | Australia Lyceum Hall, Melbourne, Victoria | Australian heavyweight title |
| NC | 7-1-4 | Australia Peter Newton | ND | 3 | 1885-07-13 | Australia Lyceum Hall, Melbourne, Victoria | |
| NC | 7-1-4 | Australia Peter Newton | ND | 4 | 1886-03-18 | Australia Lyceum Hall, Melbourne, Victoria | |
| Draw | 8-1-2 | Australia Bill Farnan | PTS | 19 | 1886-04-19 | Australia Williamstown Racecourse, Melbourne, Victoria | Australian heavyweight title |
| Win | 8-1-3 | Australia Bill Farnan | KO | 4 | 1886-04-20 | Australia Essendon, Victoria | Australian heavyweight title |
| NC | 7-1-4 | Australia Peter Newton | ND | 4 | 1886-07-10 | Australia Foley's Hall, Sydney, New South Wales | |
| NC | 3-3-3 | Australia Pablo Fanque | ND | 4 | 1886-07-12 | Australia Foley's Hall, Sydney, New South Wales | |
| NC | 6-0-1 | Australia Larry Foley | ND | 4 | 1886-07-14 | Australia Foley's Hall, Sydney, New South Wales | |
| Win | —N/a | Australia Jack Malloy | KO | 2 | 1886-07-17 | Australia Foley's Hall, Sydney, New South Wales | |
| NC | 7-1-4 | Australia Peter Newton | ND | 4 | 1886-07-31 | Australia Foley's Hall, Sydney, New South Wales | |
| Draw | 7-1-4 | Australia Peter Newton | NWS | 4 | 1886-08-07 | Australia Foley's Hall, Sydney, New South Wales | |
| NC | 4-3-0 | Australia George Seale | ND | 4 | 1886-08-14 | Australia Foley's Hall, Sydney, New South Wales | |
| Win | —N/a | Australia Maori Jack | KO | 2 | 1886-08-21 | Australia Foley's Hall, Sydney, New South Wales | |
| Win | 4-1-0 | Australia Bob Fitzsimmons | NWS | 4 | 1886-08-25 | Australia Foley's Hall, Sydney, New South Wales | |
| Win | 10-1-0 | Australia Mick Dooley | PTS | 4 | 1886-08-28 | Australia Foley's Hall, Sydney, New South Wales | |
| Win | 0-1-0 | Australia Snow | PTS | 4 | 1886-09-04 | Australia Foley's Hall, Sydney, New South Wales | |
| Win | —N/a | Australia Big Jack | PTS | 4 | 1886-09-11 | Australia Foley's Hall, Sydney, New South Wales | |
| NC | 7-1-4 | Australia Peter Newton | ND | 4 | 1886-09-18 | Australia Foley's Hall, Sydney, New South Wales | |
| Loss | 4-2-2 | Australia Peter Jackson | TKO | 30 | 1886-09-25 | Australia Foley's Hall, Sydney, New South Wales | Australian heavyweight title |
| Win | —N/a | United Kingdom Will Perkins | KO | 6 | 1887-07-11 | United Kingdom Private Show, West End, London | |
| Loss | 2-1-2 | United Kingdom Bill Chesterfield Goode | RTD | 15 | 1887-08-30 | United Kingdom The Lambeth School of Arms, Lambeth, London | |
| Win | 3-1-2 | United Kingdom Bill Chesterfield Goode | DQ | 5 | 1887-10-15 | United Kingdom Waites Room, Brewer Street, Soho, London | |
| Loss | 31-3-7 | USA Jack Fallon | PTS | 10 | 1888-12-03 | USA Palace Rink, Brooklyn, New York | |
| Loss | 32-3-7 | USA Jack Fallon | KO | 8 | 1889-01-03 | USA New York, New York | |
| Loss | 8-1-0 | USA Joe McAuliffe | KO | 8 | 1889-05-22 | USA San Francisco, California | |
| NC | 13-3-2 | USA Peter Jackson | ND | 4 | 1889-06-15 | USA Minneapolis, Minnesota | |
| NC | 15-3-2 | USA Peter Jackson | ND | 4 | 1889-07-27 | USA Erie, Pennsylvania | |
| Win | —N/a | USA Billy McCullom | PTS | 3 | 1889-07-29 | USA Genesee Hall, Buffalo, New York | |
| Win | —N/a | Australia Harry Walker | KO | 6 | 1890-07-19 | Australia Theatre Royal, Charters Towers, Queensland | |
| Loss | 15-1-2 | Australia Joe Goddard | TKO | 9 | 1891-05-26 | Australia Skating Rink, Charters Towers, Queensland | |
| Draw | 17-1-2 | Australia Joe Goddard | PTS | 8 | 1891-09-21 | Australia Crystal Palace, Richmond, Melbourne, Victoria | |
| Draw | 1-2-2 | Australia Herb McKell | PTS | 6 | 1894-10-04 | Australia Theatre Royal, Coolgardie, Western Australia | |
| Win | —N/a | South Africa Max Rossini | RTD | 1 | 1897-06-07 | South Africa Olympia Rink, Kimberley, Western Cape | |
| Loss | 37-10-6 | Canada Frank Slavin | PTS | 20 | 1898-05-28 | Canada Savoy Theatre, Dawson City, Yukon Territory | |
| Loss | 1-0-0 | United Kingdom Jack Scales | KO | 2 | 1899-11-14 | United Kingdom Bob Habbijams West End School of Arms, Newman Street, Soho, London | |
| Loss | —N/a | United Kingdom Harry Newmier | TKO | 6 | 1901-09-05 | United Kingdom Bethnal Green Athenaeum Hall, Tottenham Court Road, London | |
| Loss | —N/a | United Kingdom Sailor Bill Evarts | PTS | 8 | 1902 abt Feb | United Kingdom London | |
| Win | —N/a | New Zealand Alfred O'Brien | KO | 2 | 1903-10-19 | United Kingdom Vaughan's Gymnasium, Liverpool | |
| NC | —N/a | Canada Tommy Burns | ND | 3 | 1909-08-24 | New Zealand His Majesty's, Auckland | |
