= Robert Farnan =

Robert Farnan may refer to:

- Robert Farnan (rower) (1877–1939), American gold medalist at the 1904 Olympics
- Robert Farnan (physician) (1898–1962), Irish gynaecologist, senator, and friend of Éamon de Valera
