= Peter Jackson (boxer) =

Heavyweight boxer from Australia

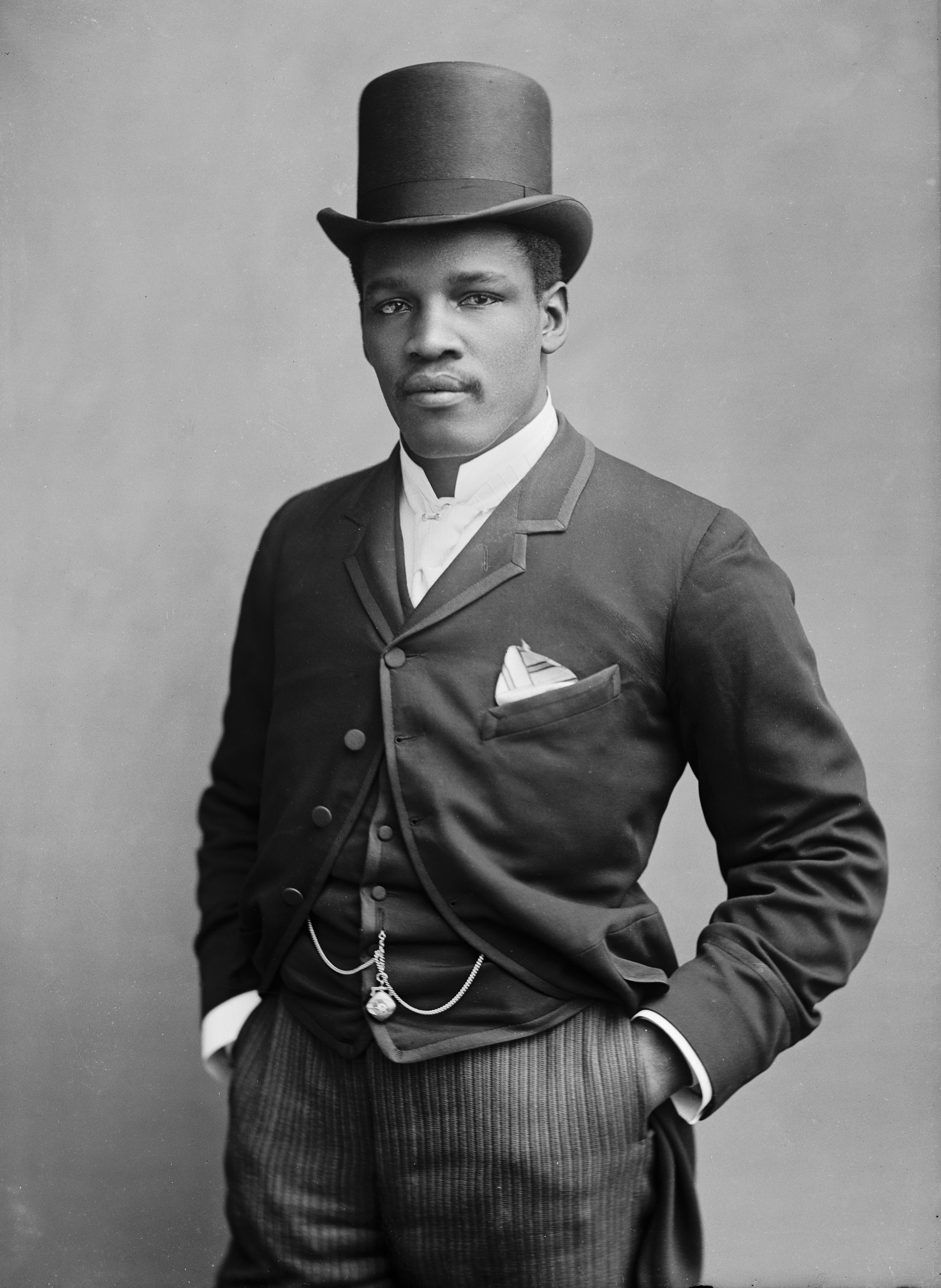
- Jackson in 1889

Personal information
- Nicknames: Peter the Great, Black Prince
- Born: Peter Jackson; 3 July 1861 Christiansted, Saint Croix, Danish West Indies
- Died: 13 July 1901 (aged 40) Roma, Queensland, Australia
- Height: 6 ft 1 1/2 in (187 cm)
- Weight: Heavyweight

Boxing career

Boxing record
- Total fights: 105
- Wins: 57
- Win by KO: 29
- Losses: 5
- Draws: 15
- No contests: 28

Peter Jackson (3 July 1861 – 13 July 1901) was an Australian heavyweight boxer who had a significant international career. Jackson was inducted into the International Boxing Hall of Fame in the inaugural 1990 class, as well as being the 2004 inductee for the Australian National Boxing Hall of Fame in the Pioneers category.

== Early life ==
Jackson was born in Christiansted on the island Saint Croix, which was then the capital of the Danish West Indies (subsequently, part of the U.S. Virgin Islands). His family originally came from Montego Bay, Jamaica. His father, also called Peter Jackson, was a warehouseman and the grandson of a freed slave who had been owned by a planter with the surname of Jackson. Born a free man, Peter was in principle (at least) a Danish citizen before he gained Australian citizenship. Jackson had a good primary school education before becoming a mariner. Originally working on ships as a deckhand in the Sydney Docks since he was 14, he used his fists to quell a mutiny. This garnered him some notoriety and brought him to the attention of Larry Foley which started his career in boxing.

== Professional career ==
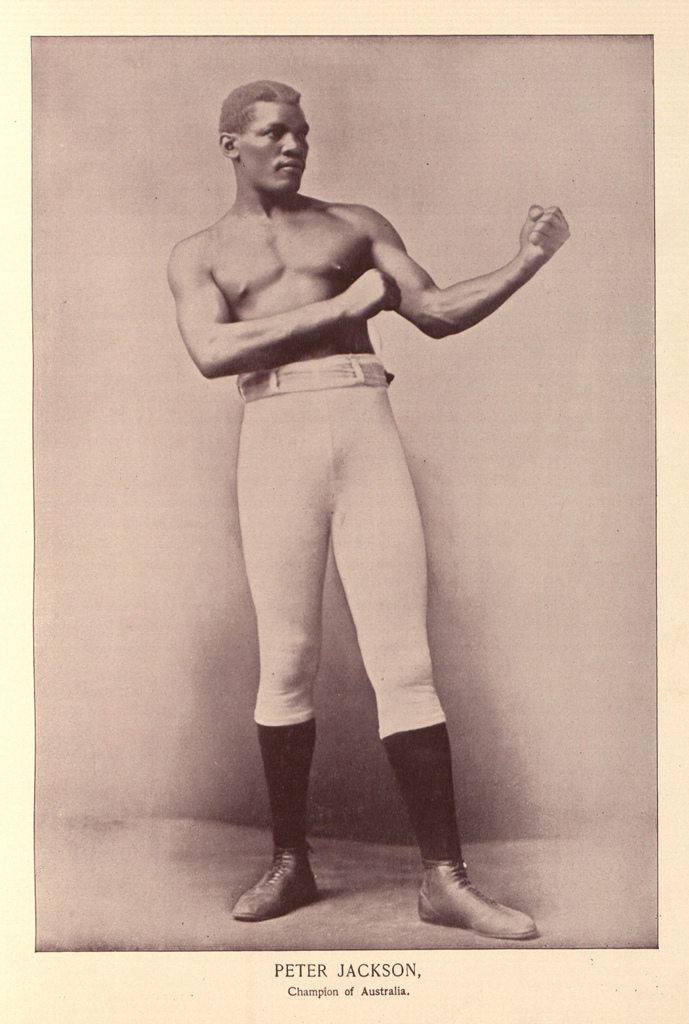
Peter Jackson

Jackson won the Australian heavyweight title in 1886 with a knockout of Tom Lees in the 30th round. Jackson was at one stage a pupil of "The Black Diamond" Jack Dowridge, a Barbadian immigrant who pioneered boxing in Queensland, Australia. Among Dowridge's other pupils was "Gentleman Jack" John Reid McGowan, a fellow Australian National Boxing Hall of Fame Inductee. After establishing his boxing career, and like many of Australia's best boxers of this era, Jackson left for America. He arrived in San Francisco on 12 May 1888. and promptly beat "Old Chocolate" Godfrey to gain the World Colored Heavyweight Championship. During his stay in America, Jackson frequently sparred with Lees. Jackson would become an instructor at the California Athletic Club in San Francisco. He was considered one of the most "scientific" boxers of his day due to his footwork and technical proficiency.

Jackson would once again embark on to strange lands after a year in America, leaving that country for Great Britain. Jackson fought for a 1,000 pounds and the inaugural British Commonwealth title against Jem Smith, winning due to the latter's use of wrestling tactics in the second round. Later that year, during a short stay in Dublin, Jackson challenged anyone to stay in the ring with him for 4 rounds. Local champion Peter Maher, who was 20 years old at the time, was the man who took up his bet. Jackson thoroughly beat him in 3 rounds. Maher would go on to have a successful career, winning over 100 bouts. During Jackson's later years there was talk of a rematch against Maher that never materialized.

Jackson repeatedly tried to secure a fight against world champion John L. Sullivan to no avail. Sullivan cited the color bar as the reason for his refusal, claiming he would never fight a black man. Although there is no data to support that claim since Sullivan had on several occasions been scheduled to fight Black fighters such as "Old Chocolate", George Godfrey and a fighter named "Johnson" whose first name has been lost to history. The Godfrey bout was broken up by police as both men were stripped and ready to fight. On 21 May 1891, in Benicia, California Jackson fought the future world champion James Corbett. The match with Corbett went 61 rounds before it was declared no contest, as both boxers were too exhausted to continue. Jackson's last defense of his Commonwealth title came against his long-time rival and fellow Australian Frank Slavin. Both Slavin and Jackson had trained under Larry Foley and a real feud had existed between them for several years, due to Slavin's racism and a romantic triangle with a woman named Josie Leon. Although they had brawled before, this was the first and only professional bout between them. After a frenetic start to the fight, Jackson would gain the upper hand en route to a 10th-round knockout of Slavin.

After a long hiatus in which he only took part in exhibitions, he lost a bout to the powerfully built James J. Jeffries. Jeffries was another great boxer who would hold the championship of the world in the early 1900s.

== Life after boxing ==
Jackson gained some fame during his stay in America. He stated his desire to play Othello, but it never came to fruition. However, he starred in a touring production of Uncle Tom's Cabin. Despite his celebrity, Jackson would run into financial troubles following his retirement from the ring. Jackson's health rapidly decayed following his bout against Jeffries, making it impossible for him to box. Several benefits were held in order to send him back to Australia.

Jackson died of tuberculosis in Roma, Queensland and was buried at Toowong Cemetery. A short time after becoming the first black heavyweight champion of the world in 1908, "The Galveston Giant" Jack Johnson, made a pilgrimage to Jackson's grave, a measure of the respect in which the man was held not only in Queensland, but in the boxing community worldwide. Jackson's tomb is emblazoned with the words "This was a man".

== Professional boxing record ==
All information in this section is derived from BoxRec, unless otherwise stated.

=== Official record ===
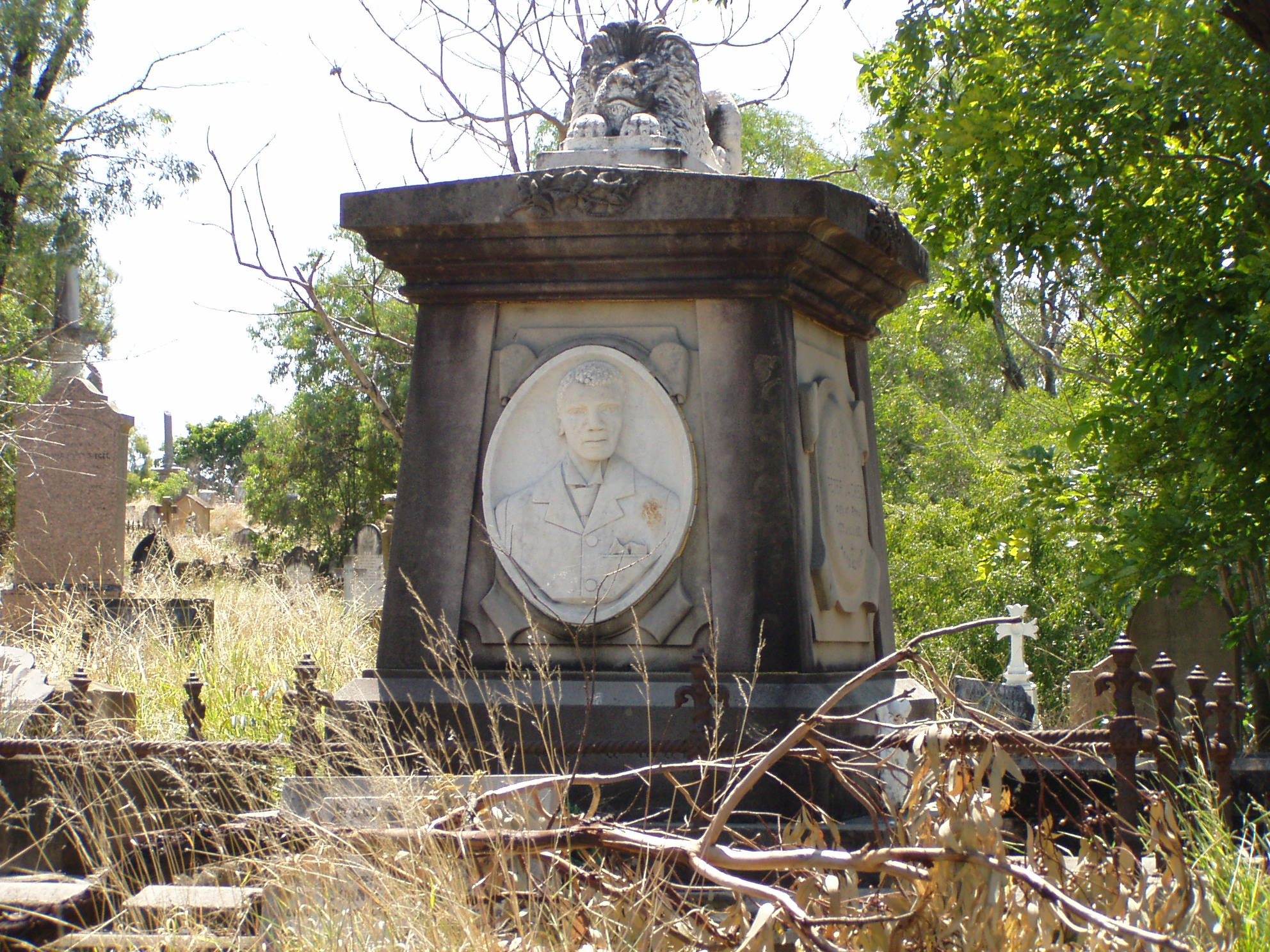
Gravesite of Peter Jackson at Toowong Cemetery

Peter Jackson & James Corbett

105 fights	42 wins	5 losses
By knockout	29	3
By decision	10	2
By disqualification	3	0
Draws	3	
No contests	28	
Newspaper decisions/draws	27	

All newspaper decisions are officially regarded as “no decision” bouts and are not counted in the win/loss/draw column.

No.	Result	Record	Opponent	Type	Round	Date	Location	Notes
105	Loss	42–5–3 (55)	Jim Jeffords	TKO	4 (20)	Aug 23, 1899	Vancouver, British Columbia, Canada	
104	Loss	42–4–3 (55)	James J. Jeffries	TKO	3 (20)	Mar 22, 1898	Woodward's Pavilion, San Francisco, California, U.S.	
103	Win	42–3–3 (55)	Denny Kelliher	NWS	3	Nov 28, 1892	Lyceum Theater, Philadelphia, Pennsylvania, U.S.	
102	Win	42–3–3 (54)	Frank Slavin	KO	10 (20)	May 30, 1892	National Sporting Club, Covent Garden, London, England	Retained Commonwealth heavyweight title
101	Win	41–3–3 (54)	Joe Butler	PTS	3	Feb 17, 1892	Philadelphia, Pennsylvania, U.S.	
100	Win	40–3–3 (54)	James Dalton	KO	3 (?)	Jan 12, 1892	Battery D Armory, Chicago, Illinois, U.S.	
99	Win	39–3–3 (54)	Jack King	TKO	2 (?)	Jan 12, 1892	Battery D Armory, Chicago, Illinois, U.S.	
98	NC	38–3–3 (54)	James J. Corbett	NC	61 (?)	May 21, 1891	California A.C., San Francisco, California, U.S.	
97	Draw	38–3–3 (53)	Mick Dooley	NWS	4	Nov 19, 1890	Sydney Amateur Gymnastic Club, Sydney, New South Wales, Australia	
96	Draw	38–3–3 (52)	Joe Goddard	PTS	8	OCt 20, 1890	Crystal Palace, Richmond, Melbourne, Victoria, Australia	Retained Commonwealth and Australian heavyweight titles
95	ND	38–3–2 (52)	William Power	ND	3	Sep 26, 1890	Melbourne Athletic Club, Melbourne, Victoria, Australia	
94	ND	38–3–2 (51)	WH Watson	ND	3	Sep 26, 1890	Melbourne Athletic Club, Melbourne, Victoria, Australia	
93	ND	38–3–2 (50)	William Power	ND	3	Sep 23, 1890	Melbourne Athletic Club, Melbourne, Victoria, Australia	
92	ND	38–3–2 (49)	WH Watson	ND	3	Sep 23, 1890	Melbourne Athletic Club, Melbourne, Victoria, Australia	
91	Draw	38–3–2 (48)	Martin Costello	NWS	4	Sep 18, 1890	McLaughlin's Athletic Hall, Adelaide, South Australia, Australia	
90	Win	38–3–2 (47)	Mick O'Brien	NWS	4	Sep 13, 1890	Apollo Athletic Hall, Melbourne, Victoria, Australia	
89	Draw	38–3–2 (46)	Martin Costello	NWS	4	Sep 9, 1890	Apollo Athletic Hall, Melbourne, Victoria, Australia	
88	Draw	38–3–2 (45)	Martin Costello	NWS	4	Sep 8, 1890	Apollo Athletic Hall, Melbourne, Victoria, Australia	
87	ND	38–3–2 (44)	Jack Burke	ND	6	Sep 6, 1890	Wagga Wagga, New South Wales, Australia	
86	Draw	38–3–2 (43)	Mick Dooley	NWS	3	Sep 2, 1890	Sydney Amateur Gymnastic Club, Sydney, New South Wales, Australia	
85	Draw	38–3–2 (42)	Mick Dooley	NWS	4	Aug 30, 1890	Olympic Hall, Newcastle, New South Wales, Australia	
84	Win	38–3–2 (41)	Tom Johnson	PTS	4	Jul 22, 1890	Marysville A.C., Marysville, California, U.S.	
83	Win	37–3–2 (41)	Denver Ed Smith	PTS	5	May 19, 1890	Battery D Armory, Chicago, Illinois, U.S.	
82	Win	36–3–2 (41)	Dick Keating	KO	1 (4)	Apr 1, 1890	Louisville, Kentucky, U.S.	Exact date unknown
81	ND	35–3–2 (41)	Gus Lambert	ND	4	Mar 5, 1890	Troy, New York, U.S.	
80	NC	35–3–2 (40)	Jack Fallon	NC	2 (?)	Mar 4, 1890	Palace Rink, Brooklyn, New York City, New York, U.S.	
79	Win	35–3–2 (39)	The Gypsy	KO	2 (4)	Feb 21, 1890	Kernan's Theatre, Washington, D.C., U.S.	
78	Win	34–3–2 (39)	James J. Walker	KO	1 (4)	Feb 20, 1890	Kernan's Theatre, Washington, D.C., U.S.	
77	Win	33–3–2 (39)	Peter Maher	RTD	3 (4)	Dec 24, 1889	Leinster Hall, Dublin, Ireland	
76	Win	32–3–2 (39)	Scotchy Gunn	PTS	4	Dec 2, 1889	Aquarium, Brighton, Sussex, England	
75	Win	31–3–2 (39)	W Woodhams	TKO	3 (4)	Dec 2, 1889	Aquarium, Brighton, Sussex, England	
74	Win	30–3–2 (39)	Sailor White	TKO	3 (4)	Nov 29, 1889	Portsmouth, Hampshire, England	
73	Win	29–3–2 (39)	Woolf Bendoff	TKO	2 (4)	Nov 29, 1889	Portsmouth, Hampshire, England	
72	Win	28–3–2 (39)	Skinner	DQ	2 (4)	Nov 7, 1889	Plymouth, Devon, England	
71	Win	27–3–2 (39)	Charles Burgin	TKO	2 (4)	Nov 23, 1889	Royal Aquarium Theatre, Westminster, London, England	
70	Win	26–3–2 (39)	Horace Horrigan	TKO	2 (4)	Nov 21, 1889	Astleys Amphitheatre, Westminster, London, England	
69	Win	25–3–2 (39)	Jem Smith	DQ	2 (10)	Nov 11, 1889	New Pelican Club Gym, Soho, London, England	Won Commonwealth heavyweight title
68	Win	24–3–2 (39)	Alf Mitchell	PTS	4	Oct 15, 1889	Astleys Amphitheatre, Westminster, London, England	
67	Win	23–3–2 (39)	Alf Ball	KO	2 (4)	Oct 15, 1889	Astleys Amphitheatre, Westminster, London, England	
66	Win	22–3–2 (39)	Jem Young	PTS	4	Oct 14, 1889	Astleys Amphitheatre, Westminster, London, England	
65	Win	21–3–2 (39)	Jack Partridge	KO	3 (4)	Oct 7, 1889	Astleys Amphitheatre, Westminster, London, England	
64	Win	20–3–2 (39)	Jack Fallon	PTS	4	Aug 19, 1889	Mike Shines' Circus, New York City, New York, U.S.	
63	Win	19–3–2 (39)	James Ginger McCormick	KO	2 (?)	Aug 9, 1889	Hoboken, New Jersey, U.S.	
62	Win	18–3–2 (39)	Billy Baker	RTD	3 (4)	Aug 8, 1889	Cronheim's Theatre, Hoboken, New Jersey, U.S.	
61	Win	17–3–2 (39)	Paddy Brennan	TKO	1 (4)	Aug 5, 1889	Genesee Hall, Buffalo, New York, U.S.	
60	Win	16–3–2 (39)	Tom Lynch	DQ	2 (4)	Jul 30, 1889	Genesee Hall, Buffalo, New York, U.S.	
59	Win	15–3–2 (39)	Billy Baker	PTS	4	Jul 29, 1889	Genesee Hall, Buffalo, New York, U.S.	
58	ND	14–3–2 (39)	Tom Lees	ND	4	Jul 27, 1889	Erie, Pennsylvania, U.S.	
57	Win	14–3–2 (38)	George Peters	TKO	3 (4)	Jul 25, 1889	Detroit, Michigan, U.S.	
56	Win	13–3–2 (38)	Charles Brown	TKO	4 (?)	Jul 11, 1889	Chicago, Illinois, U.S.	
55	ND	12–3–2 (38)	Tom Lees	TKO	2 (?)	Jun 15, 1889	Minneapolis, Minnesota, U.S.	
54	Win	12–3–2 (37)	Shorty Kincaid	TKO	2 (?)	May 11, 1889	Virginia City, Nevada, U.S.	
53	Win	11–3–2 (36)	Patsy Cardiff	TKO	10 (?)	Apr 26, 1889	California A.C., San Francisco, California, U.S.	
52	Win	10–3–2 (37)	Joe McAuliffe	KO	24 (?)	Dec 28, 1888	California A.C., San Francisco, California, U.S.	
51	Win	9–3–2 (37)	George Godfrey	TKO	19 (?)	Aug 24, 1888	California A.C., San Francisco, California, U.S.	Won world colored heavyweight title
50	Win	8–3–2 (37)	M.J. Sullivan	KO	2 (?)	Jun 20, 1888	San Francisco, California, U.S.	
49	Draw	7–3–2 (37)	Larry Foley	NWS	4	Apr 17, 1888	Foley's Hall, Sydney, New South Wales, Australia	
48	Draw	7–3–2 (36)	Mick Dooley	NWS	4	Mar 17, 1888	Foley's Hall, Sydney, New South Wales, Australia	
47	Win	7–3–2 (35)	Tom Taylor	NWS	4	Feb 11, 1888	Foley's Hall, Sydney, New South Wales, Australia	
46	Draw	7–3–2 (34)	Mick Dooley	NWS	4	Feb 4, 1888	Foley's Hall, Sydney, New South Wales, Australia	
45	ND	7–3–2 (33)	Mick Dooley	ND	4	Jan 26, 1888	Foley's Hall, Sydney, New South Wales, Australia	
44	Loss	7–3–2 (32)	Martin Costello	PTS	4	Jan 14, 1888	Foley's Hall, Sydney, New South Wales, Australia	
43	ND	7–2–2 (32)	Mick Dooley	ND	2 (?)	Dec 24, 1887	Foley's Hall, Sydney, New South Wales, Australia	
42	ND	7–2–2 (31)	Stonewall Jack	ND	2 (?)	Nov 26, 1887	Sydney, New South Wales, Australia	
41	ND	7–2–2 (30)	Steve O'Donnell	ND	3	Oct 22, 1887	Foley's Hall, Sydney, New South Wales, Australia	
40	ND	7–2–2 (29)	Steve O'Donnell	ND	3	Oct 1, 1887	Foley's Gymnasium, Sydney, New South Wales, Australia	
39	Win	7–2–2 (28)	Jim Nolan	KO	1 (4)	Sep 24, 1887	Foley's Hall, Sydney, New South Wales, Australia	
38	Win	6–2–2 (28)	Harry Stanley	NWS	4	Aug 27, 1887	Athletic Hall, Brisbane, Queensland, Australia	
37	ND	6–2–2 (27)	Jim Nolan	ND	4	Aug 25, 1887	Foley's Hall, Sydney, New South Wales, Australia	
36	ND	6–2–2 (26)	Tom Taylor	ND	4	Aug 6, 1887	Foley's Hall, Sydney, New South Wales, Australia	
35	Win	6–2–2 (25)	Steve O'Donnell	NWS	4	Jul 16, 1887	Foley's Hall, Sydney, New South Wales, Australia	
34	ND	6–2–2 (24)	Dan Hickey	ND	4	Jul 9, 1887	Foley's Hall, Sydney, New South Wales, Australia	
33	Win	6–2–2 (23)	Jim Nolan	NWS	4	Jun 25, 1887	Foley's Hall, Sydney, New South Wales, Australia	
32	Draw	6–2–2 (22)	George Seale	NWS	4	Jun 11, 1887	Foley's Hall, Sydney, New South Wales, Australia	
31	Win	6–2–2 (21)	Jim Nolan	NWS	4	Jun 4, 1887	Foley's Hall, Sydney, New South Wales, Australia	
30	Win	6–2–2 (20)	Mick O'Brien	KO	1 (6)	Apr 23, 1887	Foley's Hall, Sydney, New South Wales, Australia	
29	Win	5–2–2 (20)	Pat Kiely	NWS	4	Apr 6, 1887	Foley's Hall, Sydney, New South Wales, Australia	
28	ND	5–2–2 (19)	Pat Kiely	ND	4	Feb 15, 1887	Foley's Hall, Sydney, New South Wales, Australia	
27	ND	5–2–2 (18)	Pat Kiely	ND	4	Nov 20, 1886	Sydney, New South Wales, Australia	
26	ND	5–2–2 (17)	Steve O'Donnell	ND	4	Oct 9, 1886	Foley's Hall, Sydney, New South Wales, Australia	
25	ND	5–2–2 (16)	Jack Malloy	ND	4	Oct 2, 1886	Foley's Hall, Sydney, New South Wales, Australia	
24	Win	5–2–2 (15)	Tom Lees	TKO	30 (?)	Sep 25, 1886	Foley's Hall, Sydney, New South Wales, Australia	Won vacant Australian heavyweight title; A finish fight
23	Draw	4–2–2 (15)	Billy McCarthy	NWS	4	Aug 25, 1886	Foley's Hall, Sydney, New South Wales, Australia	
22	ND	4–2–2 (14)	Hugh Healey	ND	4	Aug 15, 1886	Newcastle, New South Wales, Australia	
21	Win	4–2–2 (13)	Riley	NWS	3	Aug 7, 1886	Foley's Hall, Sydney, New South Wales, Australia	
20	Win	4–2–2 (12)	Dan Hickey	NWS	4	Jul 17, 1886	Foley's Hall, Sydney, New South Wales, Australia	
19	Win	4–2–2 (11)	Tom Taylor	NWS	3	Jul 12, 1886	Foley's Hall, Sydney, New South Wales, Australia	
18	Loss	4–2–2 (10)	Pablo Fanque	PTS	4	May 22, 1886	Foley's Hall, Sydney, New South Wales, Australia	
17	Win	4–1–2 (10)	Bob Berbs	NWS	4	Apr 3, 1886	Foley's Hall, Sydney, New South Wales, Australia	
16	Win	4–1–2 (9)	Herbert Goddard	NWS	4	Apr 3, 1886	Foley's Hall, Sydney, New South Wales, Australia	
15	Win	4–1–2 (8)	Mick Dooley	KO	3 (6)	Mar 27, 1886	Foley's Hall, Sydney, New South Wales, Australia	
14	Draw	3–1–2 (8)	Jack Thompson	NWS	4	Mar 13, 1886	Foley's Hall, Sydney, New South Wales, Australia	
13	ND	3–1–2 (7)	Unknown Slade	ND	4	May 28, 1885	Sydney, New South Wales, Australia	
12	Win	3–1–2 (6)	Mick Dooley	NWS	4	May 28, 1885	Sydney, New South Wales, Australia	
11	ND	3–1–2 (5)	William Miller	ND	4	May 2, 1885	Sydney, New South Wales, Australia	
10	ND	3–1–2 (4)	Larry Foley	ND	3	May 1, 1885	Chiarini's Circus, Belmore, Sydney, New South Wales, Australia	
9	Draw	3–1–2 (3)	Bill Farnan	PTS	6 (6)	Sep 23, 1884	Haymarket, Sydney, New South Wales, Australia	For Australian heavyweight title; Declared a draw when Jackson's supporters broke into the ring to save their fighter who was in deep trouble
8	Loss	3–1–1 (3)	Bill Farnan	TKO	4 (?)	Jul 26, 1884	Victoria Hall, Melbourne, Victoria, Australia	For inaugural Australian heavyweight title; A finish fight
7	Win	3–0–1 (3)	Mick Dooley	NWS	4	Jun 25, 1884	Sydney Gymnastic Club, Sydney, New South Wales, Australia	
6	ND	3–0–1 (2)	Tom Lees	ND	4	Feb 2, 1884	Academy of Music, Sydney, New South Wales, Australia	
5	Win	3–0–1 (1)	Tom Lees	PTS	4	Jan 31, 1884	Academy of Music, Sydney, New South Wales, Australia	
4	Win	2–0–1 (1)	George Cave	KO	1 (6)	Jan 28, 1884	Academy of Music, Sydney, New South Wales, Australia	
3	ND	1–0–1 (1)	Tom Lees	ND	6	Jan 28, 1884	Academy of Music, Sydney, New South Wales, Australia	
2	Win	1–0–1	Dubbo	PTS	?	Mar 1, 1882	Australia	Exact date and number of rounds unknown
1	Draw	0–0–1	Jack Hayes	PTS	5	Jan 1, 1882	Queen's Hotel, Sydney, New South Wales, Australia	Exact date unknown

=== Unofficial record ===
105 fights	57 wins	5 losses
By knockout	29	3
By decision	25	2
By disqualification	3	0
Draws	15	
No contests	28	

Record with the inclusion of newspaper decisions in the win/loss/draw column.

No.	Result	Record	Opponent	Type	Round	Date	Location	Notes
105	Loss	57–5–15 (28)	Jim Jeffords	TKO	4 (20)	Aug 23, 1899	Vancouver, British Columbia, Canada	
104	Loss	57–4–15 (28)	James J. Jeffries	TKO	3 (20)	Mar 22, 1898	Woodward's Pavilion, San Francisco, California, U.S.	
103	Win	57–3–15 (28)	Denny Kelliher	NWS	3	Nov 28, 1892	Lyceum Theater, Philadelphia, Pennsylvania, U.S.	
102	Win	56–3–15 (28)	Frank Slavin	KO	10 (20)	May 30, 1892	National Sporting Club, Covent Garden, London, England	Retained Commonwealth heavyweight title
101	Win	55–3–15 (28)	Joe Butler	PTS	3	Feb 17, 1892	Philadelphia, Pennsylvania, U.S.	
100	Win	54–3–15 (28)	James Dalton	KO	3 (?)	Jan 12, 1892	Battery D Armory, Chicago, Illinois, U.S.	
99	Win	53–3–15 (28)	Jack King	TKO	2 (?)	Jan 12, 1892	Battery D Armory, Chicago, Illinois, U.S.	
98	NC	52–3–15 (28)	James J. Corbett	NC	61 (?)	May 21, 1891	California A.C., San Francisco, California, U.S.	
97	Draw	52–3–15 (27)	Mick Dooley	NWS	4	Nov 19, 1890	Sydney Amateur Gymnastic Club, Sydney, New South Wales, Australia	
96	Draw	52–3–14 (27)	Joe Goddard	PTS	8	OCt 20, 1890	Crystal Palace, Richmond, Melbourne, Victoria, Australia	Retained Commonwealth and Australian heavyweight titles
95	ND	52–3–13 (27)	William Power	ND	3	Sep 26, 1890	Melbourne Athletic Club, Melbourne, Victoria, Australia	
94	ND	52–3–13 (26)	WH Watson	ND	3	Sep 26, 1890	Melbourne Athletic Club, Melbourne, Victoria, Australia	
93	ND	52–3–13 (25)	William Power	ND	3	Sep 23, 1890	Melbourne Athletic Club, Melbourne, Victoria, Australia	
92	ND	52–3–13 (24)	WH Watson	ND	3	Sep 23, 1890	Melbourne Athletic Club, Melbourne, Victoria, Australia	
91	Draw	52–3–13 (23)	Martin Costello	NWS	4	Sep 18, 1890	McLaughlin's Athletic Hall, Adelaide, South Australia, Australia	
90	Win	52–3–12 (23)	Mick O'Brien	NWS	4	Sep 13, 1890	Apollo Athletic Hall, Melbourne, Victoria, Australia	
89	Draw	51–3–12 (23)	Martin Costello	NWS	4	Sep 9, 1890	Apollo Athletic Hall, Melbourne, Victoria, Australia	
88	Draw	51–3–11 (23)	Martin Costello	NWS	4	Sep 8, 1890	Apollo Athletic Hall, Melbourne, Victoria, Australia	
87	ND	51–3–10 (23)	Jack Burke	ND	6	Sep 6, 1890	Wagga Wagga, New South Wales, Australia	
86	Draw	51–3–10 (22)	Mick Dooley	NWS	3	Sep 2, 1890	Sydney Amateur Gymnastic Club, Sydney, New South Wales, Australia	
85	Draw	51–3–9 (22)	Mick Dooley	NWS	4	Aug 30, 1890	Olympic Hall, Newcastle, New South Wales, Australia	
84	Win	51–3–8 (22)	Tom Johnson	PTS	4	Jul 22, 1890	Marysville A.C., Marysville, California, U.S.	
83	Win	50–3–8 (22)	Denver Ed Smith	PTS	5	May 19, 1890	Battery D Armory, Chicago, Illinois, U.S.	
82	Win	49–3–8 (22)	Dick Keating	KO	1 (4)	Apr 1, 1890	Louisville, Kentucky, U.S.	Exact date unknown
81	ND	48–3–8 (22)	Gus Lambert	ND	4	Mar 5, 1890	Troy, New York, U.S.	
80	NC	48–3–8 (21)	Jack Fallon	NC	2 (?)	Mar 4, 1890	Palace Rink, Brooklyn, New York City, New York, U.S.	
79	Win	48–3–8 (20)	The Gypsy	KO	2 (4)	Feb 21, 1890	Kernan's Theatre, Washington, D.C., U.S.	
78	Win	47–3–8 (20)	James J. Walker	KO	1 (4)	Feb 20, 1890	Kernan's Theatre, Washington, D.C., U.S.	
77	Win	46–3–8 (20)	Peter Maher	RTD	3 (4)	Dec 24, 1889	Leinster Hall, Dublin, Ireland	
76	Win	45–3–8 (20)	Scotchy Gunn	PTS	4	Dec 2, 1889	Aquarium, Brighton, Sussex, England	
75	Win	44–3–8 (20)	W Woodhams	TKO	3 (4)	Dec 2, 1889	Aquarium, Brighton, Sussex, England	
74	Win	43–3–8 (20)	Sailor White	TKO	3 (4)	Nov 29, 1889	Portsmouth, Hampshire, England	
73	Win	42–3–8 (20)	Woolf Bendoff	TKO	2 (4)	Nov 29, 1889	Portsmouth, Hampshire, England	
72	Win	41–3–8 (20)	Skinner	DQ	2 (4)	Nov 7, 1889	Plymouth, Devon, England	
71	Win	40–3–8 (20)	Charles Burgin	TKO	2 (4)	Nov 23, 1889	Royal Aquarium Theatre, Westminster, London, England	
70	Win	39–3–8 (20)	Horace Horrigan	TKO	2 (4)	Nov 21, 1889	Astleys Amphitheatre, Westminster, London, England	
69	Win	38–3–8 (20)	Jem Smith	DQ	2 (10)	Nov 11, 1889	New Pelican Club Gym, Soho, London, England	Won Commonwealth heavyweight title
68	Win	37–3–8 (20)	Alf Mitchell	PTS	4	Oct 15, 1889	Astleys Amphitheatre, Westminster, London, England	
67	Win	36–3–8 (20)	Alf Ball	KO	2 (4)	Oct 15, 1889	Astleys Amphitheatre, Westminster, London, England	
66	Win	35–3–8 (20)	Jem Young	PTS	4	Oct 14, 1889	Astleys Amphitheatre, Westminster, London, England	
65	Win	34–3–8 (20)	Jack Partridge	KO	3 (4)	Oct 7, 1889	Astleys Amphitheatre, Westminster, London, England	
64	Win	33–3–8 (20)	Jack Fallon	PTS	4	Aug 19, 1889	Mike Shines' Circus, New York City, New York, U.S.	
63	Win	32–3–8 (20)	James Ginger McCormick	KO	2 (?)	Aug 9, 1889	Hoboken, New Jersey, U.S.	
62	Win	31–3–8 (20)	Billy Baker	RTD	3 (4)	Aug 8, 1889	Cronheim's Theatre, Hoboken, New Jersey, U.S.	
61	Win	30–3–8 (20)	Paddy Brennan	TKO	1 (4)	Aug 5, 1889	Genesee Hall, Buffalo, New York, U.S.	
60	Win	29–3–8 (20)	Tom Lynch	DQ	2 (4)	Jul 30, 1889	Genesee Hall, Buffalo, New York, U.S.	
59	Win	28–3–8 (20)	Billy Baker	PTS	4	Jul 29, 1889	Genesee Hall, Buffalo, New York, U.S.	
58	ND	27–3–8 (20)	Tom Lees	ND	4	Jul 27, 1889	Erie, Pennsylvania, U.S.	
57	Win	27–3–8 (19)	George Peters	TKO	3 (4)	Jul 25, 1889	Detroit, Michigan, U.S.	
56	Win	26–3–8 (19)	Charles Brown	TKO	4 (?)	Jul 11, 1889	Chicago, Illinois, U.S.	
55	ND	25–3–8 (19)	Tom Lees	TKO	2 (?)	Jun 15, 1889	Minneapolis, Minnesota, U.S.	
54	Win	25–3–8 (18)	Shorty Kincaid	TKO	2 (?)	May 11, 1889	Virginia City, Nevada, U.S.	
53	Win	24–3–8 (18)	Patsy Cardiff	TKO	10 (?)	Apr 26, 1889	California A.C., San Francisco, California, U.S.	
52	Win	23–3–8 (18)	Joe McAuliffe	KO	24 (?)	Dec 28, 1888	California A.C., San Francisco, California, U.S.	
51	Win	22–3–8 (18)	George Godfrey	TKO	19 (?)	Aug 24, 1888	California A.C., San Francisco, California, U.S.	Won world colored heavyweight title
50	Win	21–3–8 (18)	M.J. Sullivan	KO	2 (?)	Jun 20, 1888	San Francisco, California, U.S.	
49	Draw	20–3–8 (18)	Larry Foley	NWS	4	Apr 17, 1888	Foley's Hall, Sydney, New South Wales, Australia	
48	Draw	20–3–7 (18)	Mick Dooley	NWS	4	Mar 17, 1888	Foley's Hall, Sydney, New South Wales, Australia	
47	Win	20–3–6 (18)	Tom Taylor	NWS	4	Feb 11, 1888	Foley's Hall, Sydney, New South Wales, Australia	
46	Draw	19–3–6 (18)	Mick Dooley	NWS	4	Feb 4, 1888	Foley's Hall, Sydney, New South Wales, Australia	
45	ND	19–3–5 (18)	Mick Dooley	ND	4	Jan 26, 1888	Foley's Hall, Sydney, New South Wales, Australia	
44	Loss	19–3–5 (17)	Martin Costello	PTS	4	Jan 14, 1888	Foley's Hall, Sydney, New South Wales, Australia	
43	ND	19–2–5 (17)	Mick Dooley	ND	2 (?)	Dec 24, 1887	Foley's Hall, Sydney, New South Wales, Australia	
42	ND	19–2–5 (16)	Stonewall Jack	ND	2 (?)	Nov 26, 1887	Sydney, New South Wales, Australia	
41	ND	19–2–5 (15)	Steve O'Donnell	ND	3	Oct 22, 1887	Foley's Hall, Sydney, New South Wales, Australia	
40	ND	19–2–5 (14)	Steve O'Donnell	ND	3	Oct 1, 1887	Foley's Gymnasium, Sydney, New South Wales, Australia	
39	Win	19–2–5 (13)	Jim Nolan	KO	1 (4)	Sep 24, 1887	Foley's Hall, Sydney, New South Wales, Australia	
38	Win	18–2–5 (13)	Harry Stanley	NWS	4	Aug 27, 1887	Athletic Hall, Brisbane, Queensland, Australia	
37	ND	17–2–5 (13)	Jim Nolan	ND	4	Aug 25, 1887	Foley's Hall, Sydney, New South Wales, Australia	
36	ND	17–2–5 (12)	Tom Taylor	ND	4	Aug 6, 1887	Foley's Hall, Sydney, New South Wales, Australia	
35	Win	17–2–5 (11)	Steve O'Donnell	NWS	4	Jul 16, 1887	Foley's Hall, Sydney, New South Wales, Australia	
34	ND	16–2–5 (11)	Dan Hickey	ND	4	Jul 9, 1887	Foley's Hall, Sydney, New South Wales, Australia	
33	Win	16–2–5 (10)	Jim Nolan	NWS	4	Jun 25, 1887	Foley's Hall, Sydney, New South Wales, Australia	
32	Draw	15–2–5 (10)	George Seale	NWS	4	Jun 11, 1887	Foley's Hall, Sydney, New South Wales, Australia	
31	Win	15–2–4 (10)	Jim Nolan	NWS	4	Jun 4, 1887	Foley's Hall, Sydney, New South Wales, Australia	
30	Win	14–2–4 (10)	Mick O'Brien	KO	1 (6)	Apr 23, 1887	Foley's Hall, Sydney, New South Wales, Australia	
29	Win	13–2–4 (10)	Pat Kiely	NWS	4	Apr 6, 1887	Foley's Hall, Sydney, New South Wales, Australia	
28	ND	12–2–4 (10)	Pat Kiely	ND	4	Feb 15, 1887	Foley's Hall, Sydney, New South Wales, Australia	
27	ND	12–2–4 (9)	Pat Kiely	ND	4	Nov 20, 1886	Sydney, New South Wales, Australia	
26	ND	12–2–4 (8)	Steve O'Donnell	ND	4	Oct 9, 1886	Foley's Hall, Sydney, New South Wales, Australia	
25	ND	12–2–4 (7)	Jack Malloy	ND	4	Oct 2, 1886	Foley's Hall, Sydney, New South Wales, Australia	
24	Win	12–2–4 (6)	Tom Lees	TKO	30 (?)	Sep 25, 1886	Foley's Hall, Sydney, New South Wales, Australia	Won vacant Australian heavyweight title; A finish fight
23	Draw	11–2–4 (6)	Billy McCarthy	NWS	4	Aug 25, 1886	Foley's Hall, Sydney, New South Wales, Australia	
22	ND	11–2–3 (6)	Hugh Healey	ND	4	Aug 15, 1886	Newcastle, New South Wales, Australia	
21	Win	11–2–3 (5)	Riley	NWS	3	Aug 7, 1886	Foley's Hall, Sydney, New South Wales, Australia	
20	Win	10–2–3 (5)	Dan Hickey	NWS	4	Jul 17, 1886	Foley's Hall, Sydney, New South Wales, Australia	
19	Win	9–2–3 (5)	Tom Taylor	NWS	3	Jul 12, 1886	Foley's Hall, Sydney, New South Wales, Australia	
18	Loss	8–2–3 (5)	Pablo Fanque	PTS	4	May 22, 1886	Foley's Hall, Sydney, New South Wales, Australia	
17	Win	8–1–3 (5)	Bob Berbs	NWS	4	Apr 3, 1886	Foley's Hall, Sydney, New South Wales, Australia	
16	Win	7–1–3 (5)	Herbert Goddard	NWS	4	Apr 3, 1886	Foley's Hall, Sydney, New South Wales, Australia	
15	Win	6–1–3 (5)	Mick Dooley	KO	3 (6)	Mar 27, 1886	Foley's Hall, Sydney, New South Wales, Australia	
14	Draw	5–1–3 (5)	Jack Thompson	NWS	4	Mar 13, 1886	Foley's Hall, Sydney, New South Wales, Australia	
13	ND	5–1–2 (5)	Unknown Slade	ND	4	May 28, 1885	Sydney, New South Wales, Australia	
12	Win	5–1–2 (4)	Mick Dooley	NWS	4	May 28, 1885	Sydney, New South Wales, Australia	
11	ND	4–1–2 (4)	William Miller	ND	4	May 2, 1885	Sydney, New South Wales, Australia	
10	ND	4–1–2 (3)	Larry Foley	ND	3	May 1, 1885	Chiarini's Circus, Belmore, Sydney, New South Wales, Australia	
9	Draw	4–1–2 (2)	Bill Farnan	PTS	6 (6)	Sep 23, 1884	Haymarket, Sydney, New South Wales, Australia	For Australian heavyweight title; Declared a draw when Jackson's supporters broke into the ring to save their fighter who was in deep trouble
8	Loss	4–1–1 (2)	Bill Farnan	TKO	4 (?)	Jul 26, 1884	Victoria Hall, Melbourne, Victoria, Australia	For inaugural Australian heavyweight title; A finish fight
7	Win	4–0–1 (2)	Mick Dooley	NWS	4	Jun 25, 1884	Sydney Gymnastic Club, Sydney, New South Wales, Australia	
6	ND	3–0–1 (2)	Tom Lees	ND	4	Feb 2, 1884	Academy of Music, Sydney, New South Wales, Australia	
5	Win	3–0–1 (1)	Tom Lees	PTS	4	Jan 31, 1884	Academy of Music, Sydney, New South Wales, Australia	
4	Win	2–0–1 (1)	George Cave	KO	1 (6)	Jan 28, 1884	Academy of Music, Sydney, New South Wales, Australia	
3	ND	1–0–1 (1)	Tom Lees	ND	6	Jan 28, 1884	Academy of Music, Sydney, New South Wales, Australia	
2	Win	1–0–1	Dubbo	PTS	?	Mar 1, 1882	Australia	Exact date and number of rounds unknown
1	Draw	0–0–1	Jack Hayes	PTS	5	Jan 1, 1882	Queen's Hotel, Sydney, New South Wales, Australia	Exact date unknown

== See also ==
- List of heavyweight boxing champions

Awards and achievements
Preceded by Tom Lees	Australian Heavyweight Champion; 25 September 1886 - 1888	Succeeded by Frank Slavin; Won vacant title
Preceded by George Godfrey	World Colored Heavyweight Champion; 24 August 1888 - 1896	Succeeded by Bob Armstrong; Won vacant title
