= Bill Farnan =

Australian boxer

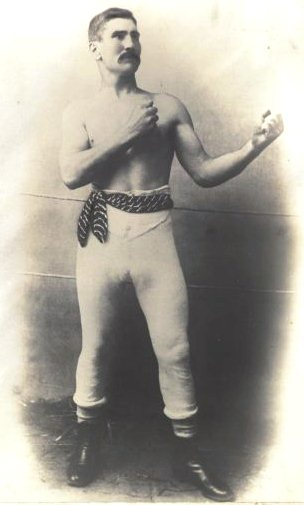

Personal information
- Nickname: The Foundry Worker
- Nationality: Australian
- Born: William Francis Farnan; 23 September 1851 Kyneton, Victoria, Australia
- Died: 15 March 1891 (aged 39) South Melbourne, Victoria, Australia
- Height: 5 ft 9 in (1.75 m)
- Weight: Heavyweight

Boxing career
- Stance: Orthodox

Boxing record
- Total fights: 45
- Wins: 8
- Win by KO: 8
- Losses: 3
- Draws: 3
- No contests: 0

Bill Farnan (23 September 1851 – 15 March 1891) was Australia's second heavyweight boxing champion.

== Family ==
The son of Patrick Farnan, and Mary Farnan, née McGuiness, William Francis Farnan was born at Kyneton, Victoria on 23 September 1851.

He married Bridget Winifred Kane (1853-1912). One of their sons, James Thomas Farnan (1875–1916) played VFL football with St Kilda, and was killed in action, while serving in France with the First AIF.

== Boxing ==
He fought the West Indian Peter Jackson in the second Australian heavyweight contest using Marquis of Queensbury rules in Melbourne on saturday, 26 July 1884.

He hit Jackson hard "between wind and water" in the second round and continuing body hits drove Jackson down and out in the third round. A return bout was proposed; and, on the following Monday (28 July) the two men agreed to a return bout.

The return bout took place, in Sydney, on Saturday, 19 September 1884. Farnan was by far the better boxer on the day, with his superiority becoming more and more evident round by round; and, as Farnan seemed close to winning the fight by a knockout, in the sixth round, a large group of Jackson's supporters invaded the ring.

The ensuing mêlée was of such intensity, ferocity, and violence that it was an hour before some semblance of order was achieved. The bout was abandoned. A meeting of relevant officials was held on Tuesday, 23 September 1884, which declared Farnan and Jackson should meet on the Thursday (25 September) to arrange a re-match:

"It has been decided that Jackson and Farnan are to box again. During the day [viz., Tuesday, 23 September] it was not thought likely that Jackson will come to the scratch, as his seconds state that he wanted to give in after the second round. Farnan does not bear a mark, and is quite well." -- The Sportsman, 24 September 1884.

== Death ==
Due to his deranged mental state, he was committed to the Kew Lunatic Asylum in early March 1891. He died at his home in South Melbourne, later that month, on 15 March 1891.

== Australian National Boxing Hall of Fame ==
Bill was the 2008 Inductee for the Australian National Boxing Hall of Fame Pioneers category.

== See also ==
- List of Australian heavyweight boxing champions

== Footnotes ==
Awards and achievements
Preceded by William Miller (Australian athlete)	Australian heavyweight Championship; 26 July 1884 – 20 May 1885	Succeeded by Tom Lees
