= Fred Casey =

Socialist educationalist

Frederic Albert Casey (1876 in Bury – October 2, 1956) was a working class socialist educationalist who was active in the National Council of Labour Colleges.

Casey was born in Bury, Lancashire, England, and became interested in dialectical materialism as presented by Joseph Dietzgen in his book The Positive Outcome of Philosophy, of which the English translation was published in 1906. Although he originally trained as a plumber, after losing his leg in an accident, he retrained as a watchmaker, and he supported himself by working as watchmaker for over fifty years. However he was also active as a tutor with the Manchester Labour College.

His article "Beginning with the Beginner" was first published in the magazine of the Plebs League and was adopted at their conference held in April 1920. It was produced as a pamphlet in which form it sold 50,000 copies.

== Works ==
- "Beginning with the Beginner" (1920) in Plebs' Magazine Vol. VII(4) 54–58
- Thinking; an introduction to its history and science (1922) London: The Labour Publishing Company Ltd.
- Method in thinking : a series of popular lectures (1933) Manchester: South-East Lancashire Labour College
- A plain talk on questions affecting the working man: an address to the Blankside Ward of Weldun Labour Party (1943) Prestwich: Cornes
- Six Talks on Morality (1943) Rawtenstall, Lancashire: F.A. Casey
- Nature of morality (1943) Rawtenstall, Lancashire: F.A. Casey
- How People Think (1949) Rawtenstall, Lancashire: F.A. Casey
- Dietzgen's logic : a plain introduction to Josef Dietzgen's "The positive outcome of philosophy": written for the plain man (1949) Rawtenstall, Lancashire: F.A. Casey
