= Bob Fitzsimmons =

English boxer (1863–1917)

Robert Fitzsimmons
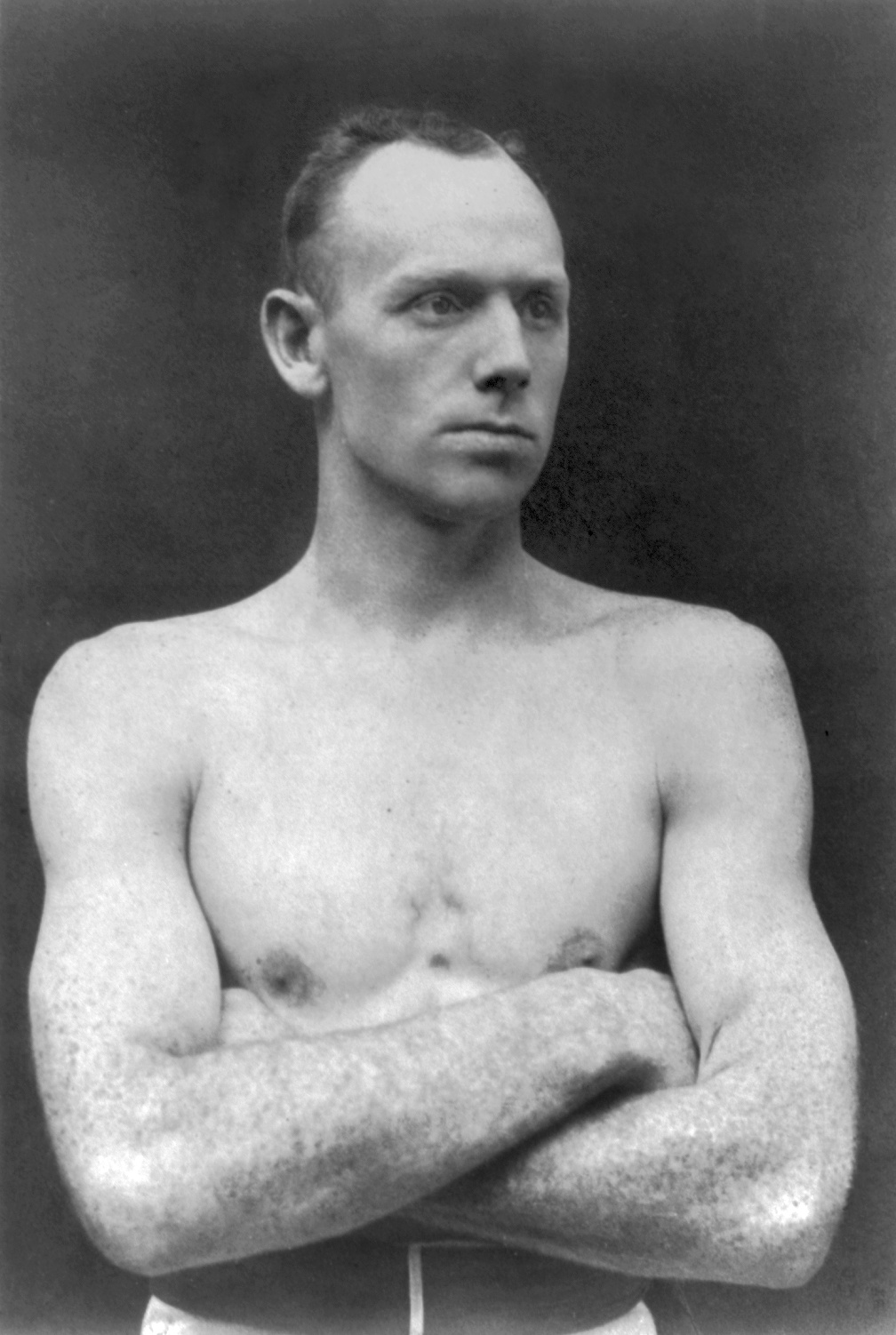
- Fitzsimmons in 1891

Personal information
- Nicknames: Bob; Ruby Rob; The Freckled Wonder; The Fighting Blacksmith
- Born: Robert James Fitzsimmons; 26 May 1863 (Note: Although some records believe his birth date was 4 June 1862) Helston, Cornwall, England
- Died: 22 October 1917 (aged 54) Chicago, United States
- Height: 5 ft 11 1/2 in (182 cm)
- Weight: Middleweight; Light-heavyweight; Heavyweight

Boxing career
- Reach: 71 1/2 in (182 cm)
- Stance: Orthodox

Boxing record
- Total fights: 101
- Wins: 69
- Win by KO: 57
- Losses: 12
- Draws: 14
- No contests: 6

Robert James Fitzsimmons (26 May 1863 – 22 October 1917) was a Cornish-New Zealand professional boxer who was the sport's first three-division world champion. In 1897, he knocked out "Gentleman Jim" Corbett to win the World Heavyweight Championship, becoming the first British-born fighter to hold the title. He is also listed in The Guinness Book of World Records as the lightest heavyweight champion, weighing just 167 pounds when he won the title. Nicknamed Ruby Robert and The Freckled Wonder, he took pride in his lack of scars and appeared in the ring wearing heavy woollen underwear to conceal the disparity between his trunk and leg-development.

After defeating George Gardiner for the world light-heavyweight title on November 25, 1903, Fitzsimmons became the oldest champion at 40, a record that lasted until George Foreman's 1994 WBA heavyweight title win. Considered one of the hardest punchers in boxing history, Fitzsimmons is ranked No. 8 on The Ring magazine's list of 100 greatest punchers of all time. Boxing writer and founder of The Ring magazine, Nat Fleischer, ranked Fitzsimmons the third greatest heavyweight of all time and regarded him as the greatest pound for pound knockout puncher in boxing history.

== Early life ==
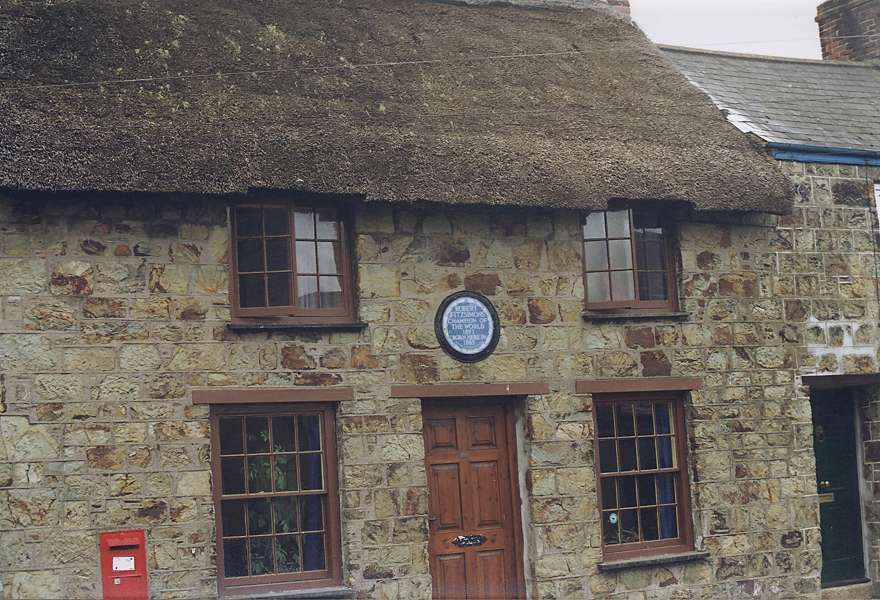
The birthplace of Bob Fitzsimmons in Helston, Cornwall

Robert James Fitzsimmons was born on 26 May 1863 in Helston, Cornwall, England, the youngest of seven boys and five girls born to James and Jane (née Strongman) Fitzsimmons. Not long before his birth, his parents had moved from his father's native Ireland to Cornwall, where his mother came from, in order for his father to find work as a policeman. Fitzsimmons received his early education at the National school in Helston. In 1873, the family moved again; James, Jane and their youngest five children sailed on the Adamant for the 93-day journey to Lyttelton, New Zealand.

They settled in Timaru, a town 147 km (91 miles) south-west of Lyttelton populated mainly by Cornish immigrants, and James Fitzsimmons established a blacksmith's forge in the town. Once Fitzsimmons had completed his education at the Timaru Main School, he took on a range of jobs. He wanted to join the crew of the Isabella Ridley, and do some service as a sailor, hoping that it would toughen him up for a career in boxing, but the ship was badly damaged in storms while still docked in Timaru. Instead, he took on a range of jobs; as a butcher's delivery boy, a carriage painter, striker at an iron foundry, and a decorator, before becoming an apprentice at his family's blacksmith's forge with his brother Jarrett. His time working in the blacksmith's forge helped to develop his upper body, particularly his arms and shoulders. During his time working in the blacksmith's forge, there are stories that Fitzsimmons was not averse to fighting quarrelsome, often drunk, customers, and it was suggested that this even boosted business, as customers returned to the forge, hoping to see a fight.

== Amateur career ==
In the early 1880s Jem Mace, an English bare-knuckle boxer, travelled to Timaru and hosted both his boxing school, and the first boxing championships held in New Zealand in 1880. Fitzsimmons entered the tournament and knocked out four opponents on his way to winning the lightweight title. He knocked out five opponents in the subsequent competition in 1881 to capture the middleweight championship. (Note: Most modern sources list these tournaments as happening a year apart, in 1880 and 1881. However, contemporary reports in the Timaru Herald suggest that they took place a few months apart in 1882.) During one of these tournaments, it is often suggested that Fitzsimmons defeated Herbert Slade, a professional heavyweight boxer who was touring with Mace, but Slade was touted as being undefeated in 1883, and it is possible that it was Slade's brother that Fitzsimmons beat. After these tournaments, Fitzsimmons boxed at least six times in New Zealand, including some bare-knuckle bouts, but it is unclear if he received payment for his fights during this time.

== Professional career ==
=== Move to Australia ===
Boxing record books show Fitzsimmons officially began boxing professionally in 1883, in Australia. He beat Jim Crawford there in a bare-knuckle fight by getting a knockout in three rounds. Fitzsimmons had his first 28 definite professional fights in Australia, where he lost the Australian middleweight title to Mick Dooley (rumours spoke of a fixed bout) and where he also won a fight by knockout while on the floor: when Edward Starlight Robins dropped Fitzsimmons to the canvas in round nine of their fight, he also broke his hand and could not continue, therefore the referee declared Fitzsimmons the winner by a knockout.

By this stage, Fitzsimmons had established his own style. He developed a certain movement and caginess from one of the greatest bare-knuckle fighters, Jem Mace. Mace encouraged Fitzsimmons to develop his punching technique, drawing on the enormous power he had gained from blacksmithing. Fitzsimmons delivered short, accurate and occasionally conclusive punches. He soon built up a reputation as by far the hardest puncher in boxing.

=== Winning the Middleweight title ===
Moving on to the United States, Fitzsimmons fought four more times in 1890, winning three and drawing one.

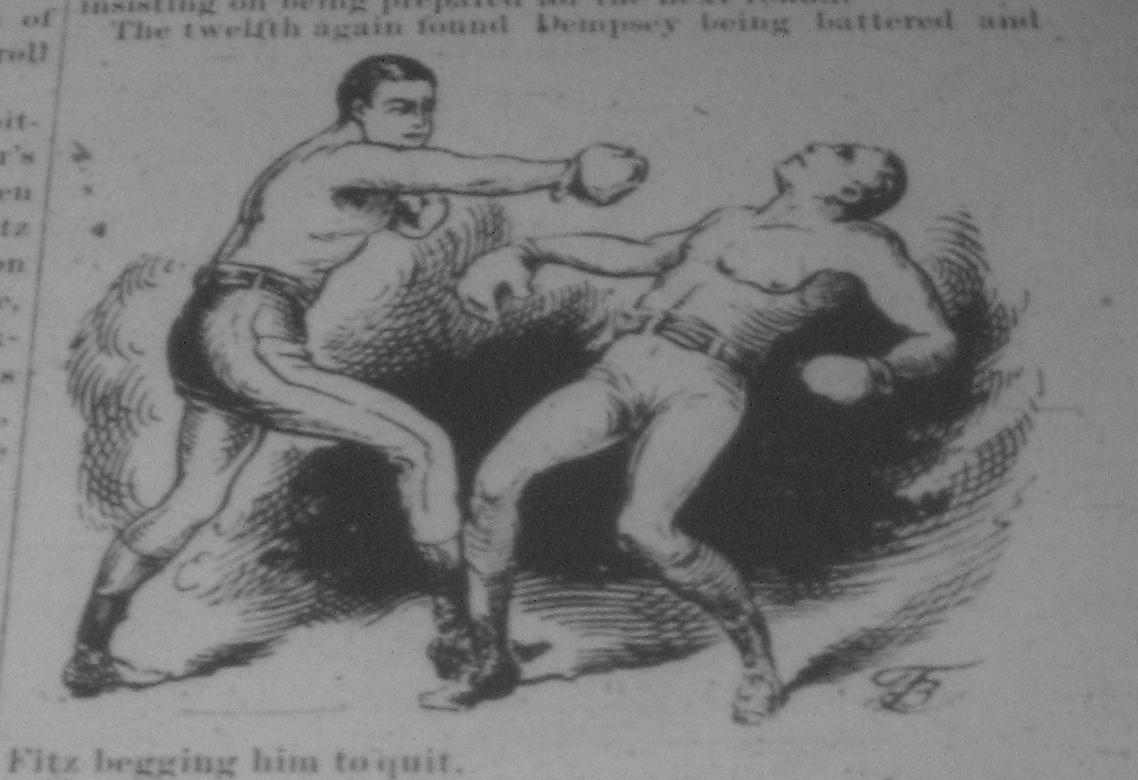
Fitzsimmons knocks down Dempsey in New Orleans, 1891.

Then, on 14 January 1891, in New Orleans, he won his first world title from Jack (Nonpareil) Dempsey. Fitzsimmons knocked out Dempsey (from whom the later Jack Dempsey took his name) in the 13th round to become the World Middleweight Champion. Fitzsimmons knocked Dempsey down at least 13 times and by the finish left him in such a pitiable condition that he begged him to quit. Since Dempsey would not do so, Fitzsimmons knocked him out and then carried him to his corner. On 22 July, police broke off his fight with Jim Hall after he had knocked Hall down several times.

Fitzsimmons spent the next two years fighting non-title bouts and exhibitions until giving Hall a chance at the title in 1893. He retained the crown by a knockout in round four. He spent the rest of that year doing exhibitions, and on 2 June, he had scheduled a two-way exhibition where he would demonstrate in public how to hit the boxing bag and then how to box against a real opponent. Reportedly, two freak accidents happened that day: Fitzsimmons hit the bag so hard that it broke, and then his opponent of that day allegedly slipped, getting hit in the head and the boxing exhibition was cancelled.

At a public sparring performance on 16 November 1894 at Jacob's Opera House, Syracuse, New York, Fitzsimmons knocked out sparring partner Con Riordan, who was carried off unconscious and died several hours later. Two months later Fitzsimmons was charged with manslaughter but was acquitted.

=== Fitzsimmons vs. Sharkey ===
After vacating the Middleweight title, Fitzsimmons began campaigning at heavyweight (the light heavyweight division did not exist at that time). On 2 December 1896, the San Francisco Athletic Club sponsored a fight at the Mechanics' Pavilion in San Francisco between Fitzsimmons and Tom Sharkey. Unable to find a referee, they called on former lawman Wyatt Earp. He had officiated 30 or so matches in earlier days, though not under the Marquess of Queensberry rules. The fight may have been the most anticipated fight on American soil that year. Fitzsimmons was favoured to win, and bets flowed heavily his way. Earp entered the ring still armed with his customary Colt .45 and drew a lot of attention when he had to be disarmed. He later said he forgot he was wearing it. Fitzsimmons was taller and quicker than Sharkey and dominated the fight from the opening bell. In the eighth round, Fitzsimmons hit Sharkey with his famed "solar plexus punch," an uppercut under the heart that could render a man temporarily helpless. The punch caught Sharkey, Earp, and most of the crowd by surprise, and Sharkey dropped, clutched his groin, and rolled on the canvas, screaming foul.

Earp stopped the bout, ruling that Fitzsimmons had hit Sharkey with a low blow. His ruling was greeted with loud boos and catcalls. Very few witnessed the foul Earp ruled on. He awarded the decision to Sharkey, who attendants carried out as "...limp as a rag."

=== Winning the heavyweight title ===
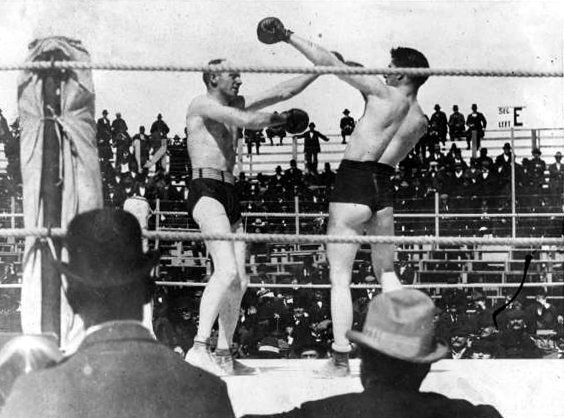
March 1897 Fitzsimmons–Corbett boxing match

In 1896, Fitzsimmons won a disputed version of the World Heavyweight Championship in a fight in Langtry, Texas, sanctioned by Judge Roy Bean, against the Irish fighter Peter Maher. On 17 March 1897, in Carson City, Nevada, he knocked out American Jim Corbett, generally recognised as the legitimate World Heavyweight Champion (having won the title from John L. Sullivan in 1892) in round 14 in what is considered Nevada's first World Championship prize fight. This constituted a remarkable achievement, as Jim Corbett, a skilled boxer, weighed one stone 3 pounds (17 lb) more than Fitzsimmons. He out-boxed Fitzsimmons for several rounds, knocked him down in the sixth round and badly damaged his face with his jab, left hook and right hand, but Fitzsimmons kept coming and Corbett began to tire. In the 14th round, Fitzsimmons won the title with his "solar plexus" punch. Corbett collapsed in agony. Fitzsimmons's "solar plexus" punch became legendary, although he himself may never have used the phrase. The entire fight was filmed by Enoch J. Rector and released to cinemas as The Corbett-Fitzsimmons Fight, the longest film ever released at the time. It was also the first time in history a full boxing match was recorded and it was the world's first feature film. Using her maiden name, it was covered by Nellie Verrill Mighels Davis, the first woman to report a prize fight.

Fitzsimmons spent the rest of 1897 and 1898 doing stage tours. In 1899, Fitzsimmons fought James J. Jeffries at the Coney Island Athletic Club near Brooklyn, New York. Most people gave Jeffries little chance, even though at over 15 stones (95 kg) he massively outweighed his opponent and was far younger, but Jeffries lifted the World Heavyweight Championship from Fitzsimmons with an 11th-round knockout.

In June 1901 Fitzsimmons took part in a wrestling match against Gus Ruhlin. He lost and went back to boxing. He then enjoyed legitimate boxing knockouts of leading contenders Ruhlin and Tom Sharkey.

In 1901 he published a book Physical Culture and Self-Defense (Philadelphia: D. Biddle). In 1902, he and Jeffries had a rematch, once again with the World Heavyweight Championship at stake. Fitzsimmons battered Jeffries, who suffered horrible punishment. With his nose and cheek bones broken, most would have sympathized with Jeffries had he quit, but he kept going until his enormous strength and youth wore down Bob and he knocked him out cold in round eight.

=== Winning the Light Heavyweight title ===
In November 1903, Fitzsimmons made history by defeating World Light Heavyweight Champion George Gardiner (also known as Gardner) by a decision in 20 rounds, becoming the first boxer to win titles in three weight-divisions.

Soon afterward, he went back to the Heavyweights, where he kept fighting until 1914, with mixed results. In 1907 at age 44, Fitzsimmons fought a much younger Jack Johnson, during the time period in which reigning champion James J. Jeffries refused to fight Johnson due to his race. The bout between Johnson and Fitzsimmons ended in victory for Johnson with a second round knockout.

=== Retirement ===
Although Fitzsimmons became a world champion in each of the Middleweight, Light Heavyweight and Heavyweight divisions, historians do not consider him the first world Light Heavyweight Champion to become World Heavyweight Champion, because he won the Heavyweight title before winning the Light Heavyweight belt. Michael Spinks counts as the first Light Heavyweight World Champion to win the Heavyweight belt as well. However, Fitzsimmons was the first Middleweight Champion to win the Heavyweight title and the only Heavyweight Champion to drop down and win the Light Heavyweight title. Fitzsimmons and later Henry Armstrong were the only men to win undisputed world championship in three different weight classes. After his retirement, Fitzsimmons moved back to his home country of England and settled in London.

Fitzsimmons had a final professional record of 69 wins with 57 by knockout, 12 losses, 14 draws, and 6 no contests (22 newspaper decisions). His exact record remains unknown, as the boxing world often kept records poorly during his era.

== Personal life ==
Fitzsimmons married four times and had six children, two of whom died in infancy. His son Robert, fighting under the moniker "Young Bob Fitzsimmons", enjoyed a moderately successful professional boxing career as a heavyweight between 1919 and 1931.

In the early 1900s, Fitzsimmons, alongside his third wife and actress Julia May Gifford, created and starred in a play surrounding their "would be divorce" titled "A Fight For Love" by Hal Reid.

== Death ==
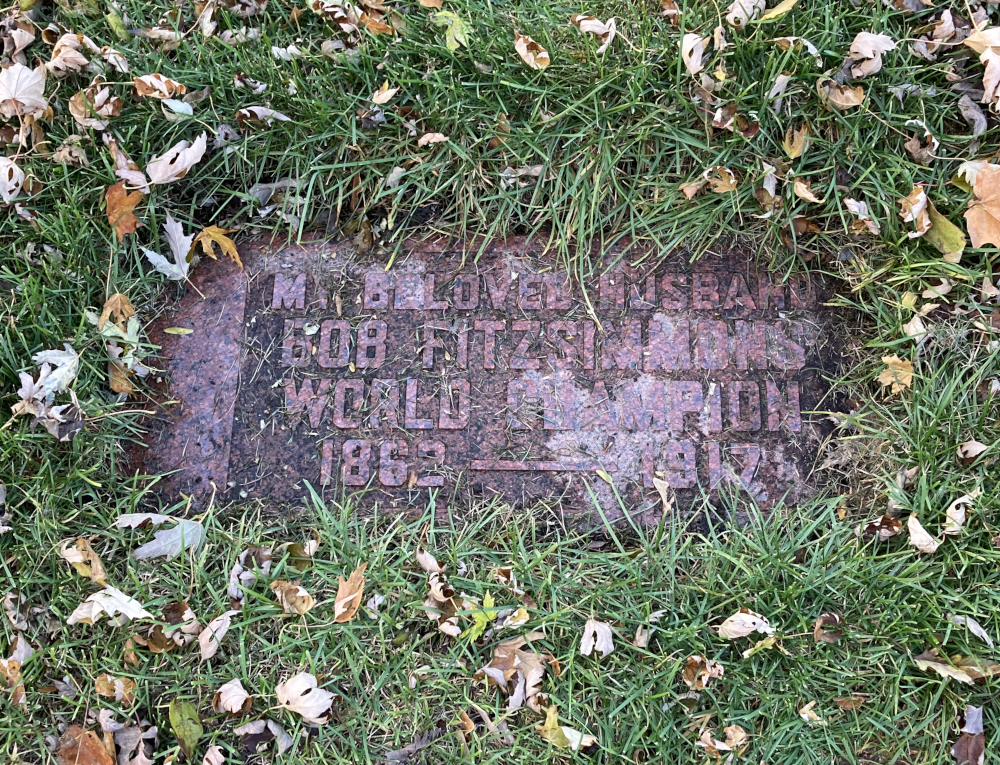
Fitzsimmons's grave at Graceland Cemetery

Fitzsimmons died of pneumonia on 22 October 1917 in Chicago, survived by his fourth wife. His grave lies in the Graceland Cemetery, Uptown. Having four wives, a gambling habit, and a susceptibility to confidence tricksters, he did not hold on to the money he made.

== Legacy ==
In 1954, Fitzsimmons was inducted into the World Boxing Hall of Fame (WBHF) and The Ring magazine's Boxing Hall of Fame.

In 1971, Nat Fleischer ranked Fitzsimmons the third greatest heavyweight of all time and regarded him as the greatest pound for pound knockout puncher in boxing history. Charley Rose named him the greatest light-heavyweight of all time.

The statue Peace on the Dewey Arch was modelled on Fitzsimmons by the sculptor Daniel Chester French. A statue of Fitzsimmons has also stood in the city centre of Timaru, New Zealand, since 1987. It was commissioned by New Zealand millionaire boxing fan Bob Jones and sculpted by Margriet Windhausen.

The International Boxing Hall of Fame has made Fitzsimmons a member in its "Old Timer" category as one of the inaugural inductees of the 1990 class. In 1995, he was inducted into the New Zealand Sports Hall of Fame.

In 2003, The Ring named Fitzsimmons number eight on their list of greatest punchers of all time.

In 2006, Fitzsimmons was inducted into the Australian National Boxing Hall of Fame as an honorary international.

In 2013, Fitzsimmons was inducted into the Bare Knuckle Boxing Hall of Fame.

== Works ==
- Fitzsimmons, Robert (1901). Physical Culture and Self-Defense. Philadelphia, PA: Drexel Biddle.

== Professional boxing record ==
All information in this section is derived from BoxRec, unless otherwise stated.

=== Official record ===
101 fights	61 wins	8 losses
By knockout	57	7
By decision	4	0
By disqualification	0	1
Draws	4	
No contests	6	
Newspaper decisions/draws	22	

All newspaper decisions are officially regarded as “no decision” bouts and are not counted in the win/loss/draw column.

No.	Result	Record	Opponent	Type	Round, time	Date	Location	Notes
101	Win	61–8–4 (28)	Jersey Bellew	NWS	6	20 Feb 1914	Municipal Hall, South Bethlehem, Pennsylvania, US	
100	Win	61–8–4 (27)	Dan Sweeney	NWS	6	29 Jan 1914	Athletic Club, Williamsport, Pennsylvania, US	
99	Loss	61–8–4 (26)	Bill Lang	KO	12 (20)	27 Dec 1909	Sydney Stadium, Sydney, Australia	For Australian heavyweight title
98	Loss	61–7–4 (26)	Jack Johnson	KO	2 (6)	17 Jul 1907	Washington Sports Club, Philadelphia, Pennsylvania, US	
97	Win	61–6–4 (26)	Charlie Haghey	KO	4 (6)	31 Jan 1906	Webster, Massachusetts, US	
96	Loss	60–6–4 (26)	Philadelphia Jack O'Brien	RTD	13 (20)	20 Dec 1905	Mechanic's Pavilion, San Francisco, California, US	Lost world light-heavyweight title
95	Win	60–5–4 (26)	Philadelphia Jack O'Brien	NWS	6	23 Jul 1904	Baker Bowl, Philadelphia, Pennsylvania, US	
94	Win	60–5–4 (25)	George Gardiner	PTS	20	25 Nov 1903	Mechanic's Pavilion, San Francisco, California, US	Won world light-heavyweight title
93	Win	59–5–4 (25)	Joe Grim	NWS	6	14 Oct 1903	Southern Athletic Club, Philadelphia, Pennsylvania, US	
92	Win	59–5–4 (24)	Con Coughlin	TKO	1 (6), 2:52	30 Sep 1903	Washington Sporting Club, Philadelphia, Pennsylvania, US	
91	Win	58–5–4 (24)	Mike Ranke	KO	2 (4), 0:15	27 Dec 1902	Bozeman, Montana, US	
90	Win	57–5–4 (24)	Steward	KO	1 (4)	19 Dec 1902	Butte, Montana, US	
89	Loss	56–5–4 (24)	James J. Jeffries	KO	8 (20)	25 Jul 1902	San Francisco Athletic Club, San Francisco, California, US	For world heavyweight title
88	Win	56–4–4 (24)	Tom Sharkey	KO	2 (25), 2:06	24 Aug 1900	Coney Island Athletic Club, Brooklyn, New York, US	
87	Win	55–4–4 (24)	Gus Ruhlin	KO	6 (25), 2:10	10 Aug 1900	Madison Square Garden, New York City, New York, US	
86	Win	54–4–4 (24)	Ed Dunkhorst	KO	2 (25), 2:25	30 Apr 1900	Hercules Athletic Club, Brooklyn, New York, US	
85	Win	53–4–4 (24)	Jim Daly	TKO	1 (6)	27 Mar 1900	First Regiment Armory, Philadelphia, Pennsylvania, US	
84	Win	52–4–4 (24)	Geoff Thorne	KO	1 (6)	28 Oct 1899	Tattersalls, Chicago, Illinois, US	
83	Loss	51–4–4 (24)	James J. Jeffries	KO	11 (20), 1:32	9 Jun 1899	Coney Island Athletic Club, Brooklyn, New York, US	Lost world heavyweight title
82	Win	51–3–4 (24)	Lew Joslin	KO	2 (4)	5 Jun 1897	Leadville, Colorado, US	
81	Win	50–3–4 (24)	James J. Corbett	KO	14 (25)	17 Mar 1897	The Race Track Arena, Carson City, Nevada, US	Won world heavyweight title
80	Loss	49–3–4 (24)	Tom Sharkey	DQ	8 (10)	2 Dec 1896	Mechanic's Pavilion, San Francisco, California US	
79	Win	49–2–4 (24)	Peter Maher	KO	1, 1:35	21 Feb 1896	Coahuila de Zaragoza, Mexico	Billed for the heavyweight championship; A finish fight
78	Win	48–2–4 (24)	Mike Connors	KO	1 (4)	19 Apr 1895	New York City, New York, US	
77	Win	47–2–4 (24)	Al Allich	KO	3 (4)	16 Apr 1895	New York City, New York, US	
76	Win	46–2–4 (24)	Dan Creedon	KO	2 (25), 1:40	26 Sep 1894	Olympic Club, New Orleans, Louisiana, US	Retained world middleweight title
75	Win	45–2–4 (24)	Frank Kellar	KO	2 (4)	28 Jul 1894	Buffalo Driving Park, Buffalo, New York, US	
74	Draw	44–2–4 (24)	Joe Choynski	PTS	5 (8)	18 Jun 1894	The Boston Theatre, Boston, Massachusetts, US	Choynski was down and bloodied when the police stepped in and would likely have been knocked out had the fight continued The bout was declared a draw. Pre-fight agreement that the fight could only be won via KO
73	Win	44–2–3 (24)	Jack Hickey	TKO	3 (4)	5 Sep 1893	Caledonian Park, Newark, New Jersey, US	
72	Win	43–2–3 (24)	Dan Coner	KO	1 (4)	30 May 1893	Philadelphia Athletic Club, Philadelphia, Pennsylvania, US	
71	Win	42–2–3 (24)	Mike Brennan	KO	4 (4)	6 May 1893	Boston, Massachusetts, US	
70	Win	41–2–3 (24)	Joe Godfrey	KO	1 (4)	21 Apr 1893	Academy of Music, Philadelphia, Pennsylvania, US	
69	Win	40–2–3 (24)	Mike Monoghan	KO	1 (4)	21 Apr 1893	Academy of Music, Philadelphia, Pennsylvania, US	
68	Win	39–2–3 (24)	Alexander Kilpatrick	KO	4 (4)	21 Apr 1893	Academy of Music, Philadelphia, Pennsylvania, US	
67	Win	38–2–3 (24)	Jack Sheridan	TKO	1 (4)	15 Apr 1893	Philadelphia, Pennsylvania, US	
66	Win	37–2–3 (24)	Dan Curry	KO	2 (4)	12 Apr 1893	Philadelphia, Pennsylvania, US	
65	Win	36–2–3 (24)	Hank Smith	KO	1 (4)	12 Apr 1893	Philadelphia, Pennsylvania, US	
64	Win	35–2–3 (24)	Alexander Kilpatrick	KO	3 (4)	12 Apr 1893	Philadelphia, Pennsylvania, US	
63	Win	34–2–3 (24)	Jack Warner	TKO	1 (4)	31 Mar 1893	Baltimore, Maryland, US	
62	Win	33–2–3 (24)	Phil Mayo	KO	2 (4)	25 Mar 1893	2nd Regiment Armory, Chicago, Illinois, US	
61	Draw	32–2–3 (24)	Dan Bayliff	PTS	4	15 Mar 1893	Indianapolis, Indiana, US	
60	Win	32–2–2 (24)	Jim Hall	KO	4	8 Mar 1893	Crescent City Club, New Orleans, Louisiana, US	Retained world middleweight title; A finish fight
59	Win	31–2–2 (24)	Jack Britton	RTD	2 (4)	10 Dec 1892	Newark, New Jersey, US	
58	Win	30–2–2 (24)	Millard Zender	KO	1 (4)	3 Sep 1892	Anniston, Alabama, US	
57	Win	29–2–2 (24)	Jerry Slattery	KO	2 (4)	11 May 1892	Miners 8th St Theater, New York City, New York, US	
56	Win	28–2–2 (24)	Joe Godfrey	RTD	2 (4)	6 May 1892	Philadelphia, Pennsylvania, US	
55	Win	27–2–2 (24)	James Farrell	KO	2 (4)	29 Apr 1892	Newark, New Jersey, US	
54	Win	26–2–2 (24)	Thomas Robbins	RTD	3 (4)	28 Apr 1892	Newark, New Jersey, US	
53	Win	25–2–2 (24)	Tom Burns	RTD	3 (4)	28 Apr 1892	Newark, New Jersey, US	
52	Win	24–2–2 (24)	James Malone	RTD	2 (4)	27 Apr 1892	Newark, New Jersey, US	
51	Win	23–2–2 (24)	Charles Puff	KO	2 (4)	26 Apr 1892	Newark, New Jersey, US	
50	Win	22–2–2 (24)	Peter Maher	RTD	12	2 Mar 1892	Olympic Club, New Orleans, Louisiana, US	A finish fight
49	ND	21–2–2 (24)	Harris Martin	ND	4	1 May 1891	Washington Rink, Minneapolis, Minnesota, US	
48	Win	21–2–2 (23)	Abe Coughle	TKO	2 (3)	27 Apr 1891	Battery D Armory, Chicago, Illinois, US	
47	Win	20–2–2 (23)	Nonpareil Dempsey	RTD	13	14 Jan 1891	Olympic Club, New Orleans, Louisiana, US	Won world middleweight title; A finish fight
46	Win	19–2–2 (23)	Arthur Upham	KO	9	28 Jul 1890	Audubon Athletic Club, New Orleans, Louisiana, US	A finish fight
45	Win	18–2–2 (23)	Billy McCarthy	RTD	10	29 May 1890	California Athletic Club, San Francisco, California, US	A finish fight
44	Win	17–2–2 (23)	Frank Allen	RTD	1 (3)	17 May 1890	California Athletic Club, San Francisco, California, US	
43	Win	16–2–2 (23)	Professor Jack West	KO	1 (4)	1 Mar 1890	Foley's Hall, Sydney, Australia	
42	Win	15–2–2 (23)	Edward Starlight Rollins	TKO	9	22 Feb 1890	Foley's Hall, Sydney, Australia	A finish fight
41	Loss	14–2–2 (23)	Jim Hall	KO	4 (20)	11 Feb 1890	Foley's Hall, Sydney, Australia	For Australian middleweight title
40	Draw	14–1–2 (23)	Edward Starlight Rollins	NWS	4	10 Feb 1890	Foley's Hall, Sydney, Australia	
39	Win	14–1–2 (22)	Dave Conway	KO	4 (15)	1 Feb 1890	Foley's Hall, Sydney, Australia	
38	Win	13–1–2 (22)	Dick Ellis	RTD	3 (20)	16 Dec 1889	Royal Standard Theatre, Sydney, Australia	
37	Win	12–1–2 (22)	Professor Jack West	KO	1 (8)	30 Nov 1889	Foley's Hall, Sydney, Australia	
36	Draw	11–1–2 (22)	Pat Kiely	NWS	4	26 Nov 1889	Foley's Hall, Sydney, Australia	
35	Win	11–1–2 (21)	Jim Hall	RTD	5 (8)	19 Jan 1889	Foley's Hall, Sydney, Australia	Won Australian middleweight title
34	Win	10–1–2 (21)	McEwan	NWS	4	1 Dec 1888	Foley's Hall, Sydney, Australia	
33	Draw	10–1–2 (20)	Jim Hall	NWS	4	24 Nov 1888	Foley's Hall, Sydney, Australia	
32	Win	10–1–2 (19)	Jim Hall	NWS	4	10 Nov 1888	Foley's Hall, Sydney, Australia	
31	ND	10–1–2 (18)	Mick Dooley	ND	4	1 May 1888	Amateur Athletic Club, Sydney, Australia	
30	Draw	10–1–2 (17)	Bill Slavin	NWS	4	17 Apr 1888	Foley's Hall, Sydney, Australia	
29	Draw	10–1–2 (16)	Bill Slavin	NWS	4	17 Mar 1888	Foley's Hall, Sydney, Australia	
28	Win	10–1–2 (15)	Bill Slavin	TKO	7 (8)	5 Mar 1888	Foley's Hall, Sydney, Australia	
27	Draw	9–1–2 (15)	Billy McCarthy	NWS	4	11 Feb 1888	Foley's Hall, Sydney, Australia	
26	Draw	9–1–2 (14)	Tom Taylor	NWS	4	26 Jan 1888	Foley's Hall, Sydney, Australia	
25	Draw	9–1–2 (13)	Dan Hickey	PTS	4	23 Jan 1888	Centennial Hall, Sydney, Australia	
24	ND	9–1–1 (13)	Frank Slavin	ND	4	1 Jan 1888	Foley's Hall, Sydney, Australia	
23	Win	9–1–1 (12)	Dave Travers	KO	3	24 Sep 1887	Foley's Hall, Sydney, Australia	A finish fight
22	Loss	8–1–1 (12)	Jim Hall	NWS	4	28 May 1887	Foley's Hall, Sydney, Australia	
21	Win	8–1–1 (11)	George Eager	KO	2 (4)	4 Apr 1887	Foley's Hall, Sydney, Australia	
20	Win	7–1–1 (11)	Bill Slavin	TKO	5 (8)	20 Mar 1887	Foley's Hall, Sydney, Australia	
19	Win	6–1–1 (11)	Dick Sandall	RTD	4 (4)	1 Mar 1887	Foley's Hall, Sydney, Australia	
18	Win	5–1–1 (11)	George Seale	PTS	4	15 Feb 1887	Foley's Hall, Sydney, Australia	
17	Win	4–1–1 (11)	Jack Bonner	NWS	4	12 Feb 1887	Foley's Hall, Sydney, Australia	
16	Draw	4–1–1 (10)	Frank Slavin	NWS	4	1 Jan 1887	Foley's Hall, Sydney, Australia	
15	Draw	4–1–1 (9)	Jack Malloy	PTS	4	4 Dec 1886	Foley's Hall, Sydney, Australia	
14	ND	4–1 (9)	McArdle	ND	4	9 Oct 1886	Foley's Hall, Sydney, Australia	
13	NC	4–1 (8)	Australian Billy Smith	ND	4	7 Oct 1886	Foley's Hall, Sydney, Australia	
12	Loss	4–1 (7)	Tom Lees	NWS	4	25 Aug 1886	Foley's Hall, Sydney, Australia	
11	Win	4–1 (6)	McArdle	NWS	4	7 Aug 1886	Foley's Hall, Sydney, Australia	
10	Loss	4–1 (5)	Mick Dooley	NWS	4	5 Jun 1886	Foley's Hall, Sydney, Australia	
9	Loss	4–1 (4)	Mick Dooley	NWS	4	2 Jun 1886	Foley's Hall, Sydney, Australia	
8	ND	4–1 (3)	Steve O'Donnell	ND	4	22 May 1886	Foley's Hall, Sydney, Australia	
7	Loss	4–1 (2)	Mick Dooley	RTD	3 (4)	15 May 1886	Foley's Hall, Sydney, Australia	
6	Draw	4–0 (2)	Brinsley	NWS	4	8 May 1886	Foley's Hall, Sydney, Australia	
5	Draw	4–0 (1)	Pablo Fanque	NWS	3	1 May 1886	Foley's Hall, Sydney, Australia	
4	Win	4–0	Pablo Fanque	KO	2 (4)	2 Feb 1886	The Green, Sydney, Australia	
3	Win	3–0	Jack Greentree	KO	3 (4)	May 1, 1885	Foley's Hall, Sydney, Australia	Exact date unknown
2	Win	2–0	Alf Brinsmead	KO	2 (4)	Apr 1, 1885	Foley's Hall, Sydney, Australia	Exact date unknown
1	Win	1–0	Joe Riddle	PTS	4	Mar 1, 1885	Foley's Hall, Sydney, Australia	Exact date unknown

=== Unofficial record ===
101 fights	69 wins	12 losses
By knockout	57	7
By decision	12	4
By disqualification	0	1
Draws	14	
No contests	6	

Record with the inclusion of newspaper decisions in the win/loss/draw column.

No.	Result	Record	Opponent	Type	Round	Date	Location	Notes
101	Win	69–12–14 (6)	Jersey Bellew	NWS	6	20 Feb 1914	Municipal Hall, Bethlehem, Pennsylvania, US	
100	Win	68–12–14 (6)	Dan Sweeney	NWS	6	29 Jan 1914	Athletic Club, Williamsport, Pennsylvania, US	
99	Loss	67–12–14 (6)	Bill Lang	KO	12 (20)	27 Dec 1909	Sydney Stadium, Sydney, Australia	For Australian heavyweight title
98	Loss	67–11–14 (6)	Jack Johnson	KO	2 (6)	17 Jul 1907	Washington Sports Club, Philadelphia, Pennsylvania, US	
97	Win	67–10–14 (6)	Charlie Haghey	KO	4 (6)	31 Jan 1906	Webster, Massachusetts, US	
96	Loss	66–10–14 (6)	Philadelphia Jack O'Brien	RTD	13 (20)	20 Dec 1905	Mechanic's Pavilion, San Francisco, California, US	Lost world light-heavyweight title
95	Win	66–9–14 (6)	Philadelphia Jack O'Brien	NWS	6	23 Jul 1904	Philadelphia Ball Park, Philadelphia, Pennsylvania, US	
94	Win	65–9–14 (6)	George Gardiner	PTS	20	25 Nov 1903	Mechanic's Pavilion, San Francisco, California, US	Won world light-heavyweight title
93	Win	64–9–14 (6)	Joe Grim	NWS	6	14 Oct 1903	Southern Athletic Club, Philadelphia, Pennsylvania, US	
92	Win	63–9–14 (6)	Con Coughlin	TKO	1 (6), 2:52	30 Sep 1903	Washington Sporting Club, Philadelphia, Pennsylvania, US	
91	Win	62–9–14 (6)	Mike Ranke	KO	2 (4), 0:15	27 Dec 1902	Bozeman, Montana, US	
90	Win	61–9–14 (6)	Steward	KO	1 (4)	19 Dec 1902	Butte, Montana, US	
89	Loss	60–9–14 (6)	James J. Jeffries	KO	8 (20)	25 Jul 1902	San Francisco Athletic Club, San Francisco, California, US	For world heavyweight title
88	Win	60–8–14 (6)	Tom Sharkey	KO	2 (25), 2:06	24 Aug 1900	Coney Island Athletic Club, Brooklyn, New York, US	
87	Win	59–8–14 (6)	Gus Ruhlin	KO	6 (25), 2:10	10 Aug 1900	Madison Square Garden, New York City, New York, US	
86	Win	58–8–14 (6)	Ed Dunkhorst	KO	2 (25), 2:25	30 Apr 1900	Hercules Athletic Club, Brooklyn, New York, US	
85	Win	57–8–14 (6)	Jim Daly	TKO	1 (6)	27 Mar 1900	First Regiment Armory, Philadelphia, Pennsylvania, US	
84	Win	56–8–14 (6)	Geoff Thorne	KO	1 (6)	28 Oct 1899	Tattersalls, Chicago, Illinois, US	
83	Loss	55–8–14 (6)	James J. Jeffries	KO	11 (20), 1:32	9 Jun 1899	Coney Island Athletic Club, Brooklyn, New York, US	Lost world heavyweight title
82	Win	55–7–14 (6)	Lew Joslin	KO	2 (4)	5 Jun 1897	Leadville, Colorado, US	
81	Win	54–7–14 (6)	James J. Corbett	KO	14 (25)	17 Mar 1897	The Race Track Arena, Carson City, Nevada, US	Won world heavyweight title
80	Loss	53–7–14 (6)	Tom Sharkey	DQ	8 (10)	2 Dec 1896	Mechanic's Pavilion, San Francisco, California US	Billed as the world heavyweight title
79	Win	53–6–14 (6)	Peter Maher	KO	1, 1:35	21 Feb 1896	Coahuila de Zaragoza, Mexico	Billed as the world heavyweight title; A finish fight
78	Win	52–6–14 (6)	Mike Connors	KO	1 (4)	19 Apr 1895	New York City, New York, US	
77	Win	51–6–14 (6)	Al Allich	KO	3 (4)	16 Apr 1895	New York City, New York, US	
76	Win	50–6–14 (6)	Dan Creedon	KO	2 (25), 1:40	26 Sep 1894	Olympic Club, New Orleans, Louisiana, US	Retained world middleweight title
75	Win	49–6–14 (6)	Frank Kellar	KO	2 (4)	28 Jul 1894	Buffalo Driving Park, Buffalo, New York, US	
74	Draw	48–6–14 (6)	Joe Choynski	PTS	5 (8)	18 Jun 1894	The Boston Theatre, Boston, Massachusetts, US	Choynski was down and bloodied when the police stepped in and would likely have been knocked out had the fight continued The bout was declared a draw. Pre-fight agreement that the fight could only be won via KO
73	Win	48–6–13 (6)	Jack Hickey	TKO	3 (4)	5 Sep 1893	Caledonian Park, Newark, New Jersey, US	
72	Win	47–6–13 (6)	Dan Coner	KO	1 (4)	30 May 1893	Philadelphia Athletic Club, Philadelphia, Pennsylvania, US	
71	Win	46–6–13 (6)	Mike Brennan	KO	4 (4)	6 May 1893	Boston, Massachusetts, US	
70	Win	45–6–13 (6)	Joe Godfrey	KO	1 (4)	21 Apr 1893	Academy of Music, Philadelphia, Pennsylvania, US	
69	Win	44–6–13 (6)	Mike Monoghan	KO	1 (4)	21 Apr 1893	Academy of Music, Philadelphia, Pennsylvania, US	
68	Win	43–6–13 (6)	Alexander Kilpatrick	KO	4 (4)	21 Apr 1893	Academy of Music, Philadelphia, Pennsylvania, US	
67	Win	42–6–13 (6)	Jack Sheridan	TKO	1 (4)	15 Apr 1893	Philadelphia, Pennsylvania, US	
66	Win	41–6–13 (6)	Dan Curry	KO	2 (4)	12 Apr 1893	Philadelphia, Pennsylvania, US	
65	Win	40–6–13 (6)	Hank Smith	KO	1 (4)	12 Apr 1893	Philadelphia, Pennsylvania, US	
64	Win	39–6–13 (6)	Alexander Kilpatrick	KO	3 (4)	12 Apr 1893	Philadelphia, Pennsylvania, US	
63	Win	38–6–13 (6)	Jack Warner	TKO	1 (4)	31 Mar 1893	Baltimore, Maryland, US	
62	Win	37–6–13 (6)	Phil Mayo	KO	2 (4)	25 Mar 1893	2nd Regiment Armory, Chicago, Illinois, US	
61	Draw	36–6–13 (6)	Dan Bayliff	PTS	4	15 Mar 1893	Indianapolis, Indiana, US	
60	Win	36–6–12 (6)	Jim Hall	KO	4	8 Mar 1893	Crescent City Club, New Orleans, Louisiana, US	Retained world middleweight title; A finish fight
59	Win	35–6–12 (6)	Jack Britton	RTD	2 (4)	10 Dec 1892	Newark, New Jersey, US	
58	Win	34–6–12 (6)	Millard Zender	KO	1 (4)	3 Sep 1892	Anniston, Alabama, US	
57	Win	33–6–12 (6)	Jerry Slattery	KO	2 (4)	11 May 1892	Miners 8th St Theater, New York City, New York, US	
56	Win	32–6–12 (6)	Joe Godfrey	RTD	2 (4)	6 May 1892	Philadelphia, Pennsylvania, US	
55	Win	31–6–12 (6)	James Farrell	KO	2 (4)	29 Apr 1892	Newark, New Jersey, US	
54	Win	30–6–12 (6)	Thomas Robbins	RTD	3 (4)	28 Apr 1892	Newark, New Jersey, US	
53	Win	29–6–12 (6)	Tom Burns	RTD	3 (4)	28 Apr 1892	Newark, New Jersey, US	
52	Win	28–6–12 (6)	James Malone	RTD	2 (4)	27 Apr 1892	Newark, New Jersey, US	
51	Win	27–6–12 (6)	Charles Puff	KO	2 (4)	26 Apr 1892	Newark, New Jersey, US	
50	Win	26–6–12 (6)	Peter Maher	RTD	12	2 Mar 1892	Olympic Club, New Orleans, Louisiana, US	A finish fight
49	ND	25–6–12 (6)	Harris Martin	ND	4	1 May 1891	Washington Rink, Minneapolis, Minnesota, US	
48	Win	25–6–12 (5)	Abe Coughle	TKO	2 (3)	27 Apr 1891	Battery D Armory, Chicago, Illinois, US	
47	Win	24–6–12 (5)	Nonpareil Dempsey	RTD	13	14 Jan 1891	Olympic Club, New Orleans, Louisiana, US	Won world middleweight title; A finish fight
46	Win	23–6–12 (5)	Arthur Upham	KO	9	28 Jul 1890	Audubon Athletic Club, New Orleans, Louisiana, US	A finish fight
45	Win	22–6–12 (5)	Billy McCarthy	RTD	10	29 May 1890	California Athletic Club, San Francisco, California, US	A finish fight
44	Win	21–6–12 (5)	Frank Allen	RTD	1 (3)	17 May 1890	California Athletic Club, San Francisco, California, US	
43	Win	20–6–12 (5)	Professor Jack West	KO	1 (4)	1 Mar 1890	Foley's Hall, Sydney, Australia	
42	Win	19–6–12 (5)	Edward Starlight Rollins	TKO	9	22 Feb 1890	Foley's Hall, Sydney, Australia	A finish fight
41	Loss	18–6–12 (5)	Jim Hall	KO	4 (20)	11 Feb 1890	Foley's Hall, Sydney, Australia	For Australian middleweight title
40	Draw	18–5–12 (5)	Edward Starlight Rollins	NWS	4	10 Feb 1890	Foley's Hall, Sydney, Australia	
39	Win	18–5–11 (5)	Dave Conway	KO	4 (15)	1 Feb 1890	Foley's Hall, Sydney, Australia	
38	Win	17–5–11 (5)	Dick Ellis	RTD	3 (20)	16 Dec 1889	Royal Standard Theatre, Sydney, Australia	
37	Win	16–5–11 (5)	Professor Jack West	KO	1 (8)	30 Nov 1889	Foley's Hall, Sydney, Australia	
36	Draw	15–5–11 (5)	Pat Kiely	NWS	4	26 Nov 1889	Foley's Hall, Sydney, Australia	
35	Win	15–5–10 (5)	Jim Hall	RTD	5 (8)	19 Jan 1889	Foley's Hall, Sydney, Australia	Won Australian middleweight title
34	Win	14–5–10 (5)	McEwan	NWS	4	1 Dec 1888	Foley's Hall, Sydney, Australia	
33	Draw	13–5–10 (5)	Jim Hall	NWS	4	24 Nov 1888	Foley's Hall, Sydney, Australia	
32	Win	13–5–9 (5)	Jim Hall	NWS	4	10 Nov 1888	Foley's Hall, Sydney, Australia	
31	ND	12–5–9 (5)	Mick Dooley	ND	4	1 May 1888	Amateur Athletic Club, Sydney, Australia	
30	Draw	12–5–9 (4)	Bill Slavin	NWS	4	17 Apr 1888	Foley's Hall, Sydney, Australia	
29	Draw	12–5–8 (4)	Bill Slavin	NWS	4	17 Mar 1888	Foley's Hall, Sydney, Australia	
28	Win	12–5–7 (4)	Bill Slavin	TKO	7 (8)	5 Mar 1888	Foley's Hall, Sydney, Australia	
27	Draw	11–5–7 (4)	Billy McCarthy	NWS	4	11 Feb 1888	Foley's Hall, Sydney, Australia	
26	Draw	11–5–6 (4)	Tom Taylor	NWS	4	26 Jan 1888	Foley's Hall, Sydney, Australia	
25	Draw	11–5–5 (4)	Dan Hickey	PTS	4	23 Jan 1888	Centennial Hall, Sydney, Australia	
24	ND	11–5–4 (4)	Frank Slavin	ND	4	1 Jan 1888	Foley's Hall, Sydney, Australia	
23	Win	11–5–4 (3)	Dave Travers	KO	3	24 Sep 1887	Foley's Hall, Sydney, Australia	A finish fight
22	Loss	10–5–4 (3)	Jim Hall	NWS	4	28 May 1887	Foley's Hall, Sydney, Australia	
21	Win	10–4–4 (3)	George Eager	KO	2 (4)	4 Apr 1887	Foley's Hall, Sydney, Australia	
20	Win	9–4–4 (3)	Bill Slavin	TKO	5 (8)	20 Mar 1887	Foley's Hall, Sydney, Australia	
19	Win	8–4–4 (3)	Dick Sandall	RTD	4 (4)	1 Mar 1887	Foley's Hall, Sydney, Australia	
18	Win	7–4–4 (3)	George Seale	PTS	4	15 Feb 1887	Foley's Hall, Sydney, Australia	
17	Win	6–4–4 (3)	Jack Bonner	NWS	4	12 Feb 1887	Foley's Hall, Sydney, Australia	
16	Draw	5–4–4 (3)	Frank Slavin	NWS	4	1 Jan 1887	Foley's Hall, Sydney, Australia	
15	Draw	5–4–3 (3)	Jack Malloy	PTS	4	4 Dec 1886	Foley's Hall, Sydney, Australia	
14	ND	5–4–2 (3)	McArdle	ND	4	9 Oct 1886	Foley's Hall, Sydney, Australia	
13	ND	5–4–2 (2)	Australian Billy Smith	ND	4	7 Oct 1886	Foley's Hall, Sydney, Australia	
12	Loss	5–4–2 (1)	Tom Lees	NWS	4	25 Aug 1886	Foley's Hall, Sydney, Australia	
11	Win	5–3–2 (1)	McArdle	NWS	4	7 Aug 1886	Foley's Hall, Sydney, Australia	
10	Loss	4–3–2 (1)	Mick Dooley	NWS	4	5 Jun 1886	Foley's Hall, Sydney, Australia	
9	Loss	4–2–2 (1)	Mick Dooley	NWS	4	2 Jun 1886	Foley's Hall, Sydney, Australia	
8	ND	4–1–2 (1)	Steve O'Donnell	ND	4	22 May 1886	Foley's Hall, Sydney, Australia	
7	Loss	4–1–2	Mick Dooley	RTD	3 (4)	15 May 1886	Foley's Hall, Sydney, Australia	
6	Draw	4–0–2	Brinsley	NWS	4	8 May 1886	Foley's Hall, Sydney, Australia	
5	Draw	4–0–1	Pablo Fanque	NWS	3	1 May 1886	Foley's Hall, Sydney, Australia	
4	Win	4–0	Pablo Fanque	KO	2 (4)	2 Feb 1886	The Green, Sydney, Australia	
3	Win	3–0	Jack Greentree	KO	3 (4)	1 May 1885	Foley's Hall, Sydney, Australia	Exact date unknown
2	Win	2–0	Alf Brinsmead	KO	2 (4)	1 Apr 1885	Foley's Hall, Sydney, Australia	Exact date unknown
1	Win	1–0	Joe Riddle	PTS	4	1 Mar 1885	Foley's Hall, Sydney, Australia	Exact date unknown

== Titles in boxing ==
=== Major world titles ===
- World middleweight champion (160 lbs)
- World light-heavyweight champion (175 lbs)
- World heavyweight champion (200+ lbs)

=== Regional/International titles ===
- Australian middleweight champion

=== Amateur titles ===
- New Zealand lightweight champion
- New Zealand middleweight champion

== See also ==
- List of heavyweight boxing champions
- List of light heavyweight boxing champions
- List of middleweight boxing champions
- List of boxing triple champions

== Notes and references ==
=== References ===
Achievements
Preceded by Nonpareil Jack Dempsey	World Middleweight Champion; 14 January 1891 – 26 September 1894; Vacated	Succeeded by Kid McCoy
Preceded by James J. Corbett	World Heavyweight Champion; 17 March 1897 – 9 June 1899	Succeeded by James J. Jeffries
Preceded by George Gardiner	World Light Heavyweight Champion; 25 September 1903 – 20 December 1905	Succeeded by Philadelphia Jack O'Brien
Titles in pretence
Preceded by Peter Maher	World Heavyweight Champion; 21 February 1896 – 2 December 1896	Succeeded by Tom Sharkey
