= Jim Hall (boxer) =

Australian boxer

Personal information
- Nickname: Jim Hall
- Nationality: Australian
- Born: Montague James Furlong; 22 July 1868 Sydney, New South Wales
- Died: 14 March 1913 (aged 44) Stevens Point, Wisconsin
- Height: 6 ft 0 1/2 in (1.84 m)
- Weight: 158–170 lb (72–77 kg)

Boxing career
- Reach: 74 in (188 cm)
- Stance: orthodox

Boxing record
- Total fights: 93
- Wins: 40
- Win by KO: 37
- Losses: 12
- Draws: 9
- No contests: 30

Montague James Furlong (22 July 1868 – 14 March 1913), commonly known as Jim Hall, was an Australian middleweight boxer. He won the Australian middleweight title in 1887 before moving to the United States in an attempt to take the World title from Jack (Nonpareil) Dempsey. Described as "one of the best little fighters that ever lived" in The Milwaukee Journal, Hall's career was affected by alcoholism, and he died of tuberculosis in 1913.

Hall was the 2007 Inductee for the Australian National Boxing Hall of Fame Pioneers category.

== Biography ==
=== Australia ===
Born in Sydney, New South Wales, Hall began his professional boxing career in 1886 at the age of 17. Fighting mainly in Sydney, he established himself as one of the country's best middleweights with his quick and graceful style. He won the Australian middleweight title at his first attempt in 1887, defeating Jim Fogarty with a knockout. His only loss to that point was to welterweight Billy Williams, who Hall said he could knock out in 4 rounds - though he failed to do so. Successfully defending his title against Fogarty, Edward Rollins and Peter Boland, Hall soon established a strong rivalry with New Zealand emigrant Bob Fitzsimmons, who challenged him to a title fight in 1890. Though the records show that Fitzsimmons was counted out in round four, he later alleged he had taken a pre-arranged "dive" for a payment of around $US75, which he said was never paid by Hall. Hall vehemently denied Fitzsimmons' claims of a fixed bout, and the true story behind the fight is still unknown.

Shortly afterwards, Hall planned to leave Australia for the United States, seeking a title match with World Champion Jack (Nonpareil) Dempsey. On the way to his boat, Hall was drunk and started a fight, during which he was stabbed in the right hand. Forced to stay and recuperate in Australia while Fitzsimmons went to the US and won the world title, Hall lost his Australian belt to Owen Sullivan in Broken Hill, New South Wales. By the end of 1890, however, Hall had recovered his Australian championship in a match against Starlight Rollins, before losing it to Billy McCarthy on 18 January 1892 – he embarked for America three days later aboard the ship Alameda.

=== United States ===
Hall began training at John Kline's "Manly Art Institute" in Beloit, Wisconsin, and notched up an impressive string of wins. Continuing their rivalry from Australia, Hall and Fitzsimmons signed to fight on 22 July 1891 in Saint Paul, Minnesota for a stake of $12,000. The bout was anticipated as "one of the fiercest battles ever fought by middleweights" in the US, and one newspaper reported that the "bad blood" between the pair was incentive enough for them to fight, regardless of the money on offer. According to reports, Hall was in prime condition for the event, even abstaining from alcohol, "except for an occasional touch of claret". On the day of the fight however, Minnesota Governor William Rush Merriam ordered four companies of National Guardsmen to surround the amphitheatre and prevent the event from occurring.

Hall's alcoholism still caused problems, and on 23 August he attacked his manager Charles "Parson" Davies with a bottle after an argument in a tavern. Davies retaliated, stabbing Hall in the neck with a small knife, reportedly missing the boxer's jugular vein by a quarter of an inch. Hall went through 1892 undefeated in the ring - which included a trip across the Atlantic to England, where he won the British version of the World middleweight title from Ted Pritchard. Returning to America, Hall and Fitzsimmons again agreed on a match for Fitzsimmons' World title, to be held in New Orleans, Louisiana, on 8 March 1893. Kline worked Hall hard in training, but the fighter resisted, with The New York World newspaper reporting that he ate what he pleased and continued to drink a quart of Burgundy a day. Despite this, Hall was favourite for the fight, but was knocked out by Fitzsimmons in only the fourth round.

Hall contested and won two more fights in London, including one against Frank "Paddy" Slavin, whom he had challenged while drinking in a tavern that Slavin owned. From 1894 onwards, Hall's fights (and wins) became less regular, and reports of his misbehaviour increased. In Louisville, Kentucky, Hall was sued by a doctor for "maintaining guilty relations" with the doctor's wife, and he was also arrested in Cleveland, Ohio and London for drunken fights. The night before a fight against Charles Lawler, Hall was again arrested for public drunkenness, and was reportedly still intoxicated when he stepped into the ring, defeating Lawler in the tenth round. In September 1899, Hall challenged Joe Choynski for the World light-heavyweight title and was knocked out in seven rounds by the Californian (although some sources report it was three rounds), who had done the same to him in thirteen rounds just three years earlier. Hall's final fight was held in 1900, against Tommy Dixon, and ended in a draw after 20 rounds.

=== Death ===
After being diagnosed with tuberculosis (TB) in December 1900, Hall moved to Chicago, Illinois, and was taken in by a charity ward. He was told to leave however, after being found stealing personal items, such as jewelry, off unclaimed corpses at the nearby morgue and selling them to buy alcohol. Hall died at age 44 in the Wisconsin state TB sanatorium in Stevens Point. An admirer called Patsy Callahan arranged for Hall's burial at Oak Hill Cemetery in Neenah, Wisconsin, but did not mark the grave with a headstone. The reason for this is speculated to be that Hall had blown his money earned in boxing and sold his skeleton to Dr. Rahde, a surgeon in Chicago, for $150. Hall used up this money on alcohol, however, and ripped up the contract before punching Rahde. When the doctor complained; Callahan decided to keep Hall's bones safe from the scorned Rahde. With any claim to the boxer's bones diminished, boxing historian Bill Schutte bought a headstone in June 2006, had it engraved with a pair of boxing gloves and the epitaph "Prizefighter", and placed it on the grave - 93 years after Hall's death.

== Boxing style ==
Weighing around 160 pounds (73 kg) during his career, and never heavier than light heavyweight, Hall was renowned for challenging even heavyweight fighters without taking a backward step. Hall's remarkable grace and agility in the ring allowed him to keep his opponents off-balance, and a thorough knowledge of ring-craft helped him use this to his advantage. Hall's punch was not particularly strong, but was very effective against his opponents' vulnerable and awkward techniques. Writing in The Ring magazine, George T. Tickell described Hall as "a remarkably brilliant boxer ... [with] the ability to think and act simultaneously, [making] him a perfect specimen of the bruising glove artist."
