= Bob Fitzsimmons vs. Peter Maher =

1896 boxing match

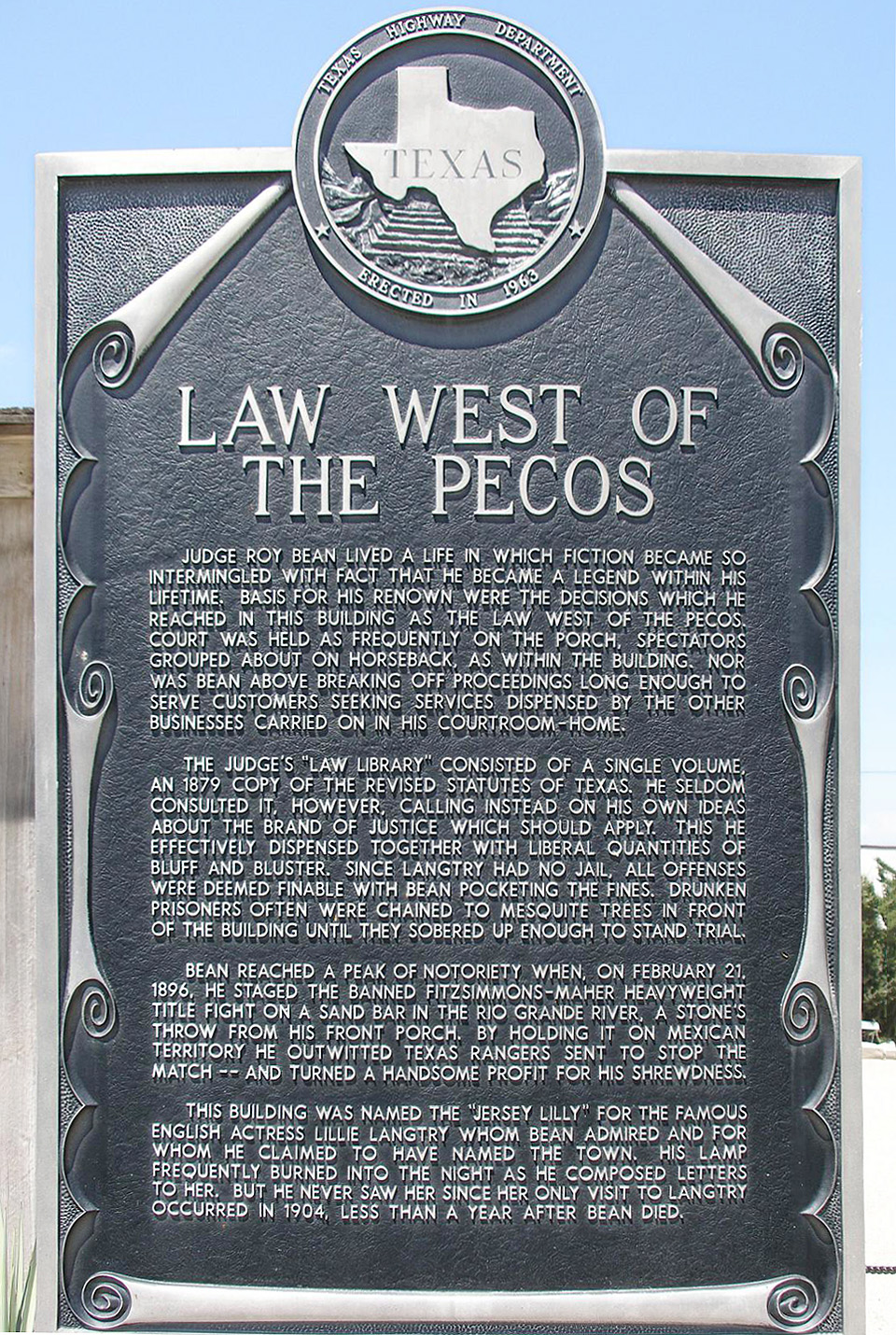
The Jersey Lilly Texas Historical Marker in Langtry, in part, commemorates the fight.

The Fitzsimmons-Maher Prizefight (February 21, 1896), also considered, unofficially, as the 1896 World Heavyweight Championship, occurred between Bob Fitzsimmons and Peter Maher on a sandbar in the Rio Grande just far enough outside of the American city of Langtry, Texas, in which state boxing was illegal, to be considered technically in the Mexican state of Coahuila de Zaragoza. Fitzsimmons was victorious, knocking Maher out in the first round; however, upon hearing of the outcome of the fight, the 1895 World Heavyweight Champion James J. Corbett immediately rescinded his retirement.

== See also ==
- Ranger James Brooks, an officer of the law who tried to stop the fight
- Judge Roy Bean, a local justice of the peace who promoted the fight
- Fitzsimmons vs. Sharkey, the next major bout fought by Fitzsimmons
