= Peter Maher (boxer) =

Irish boxer (1869–1940)

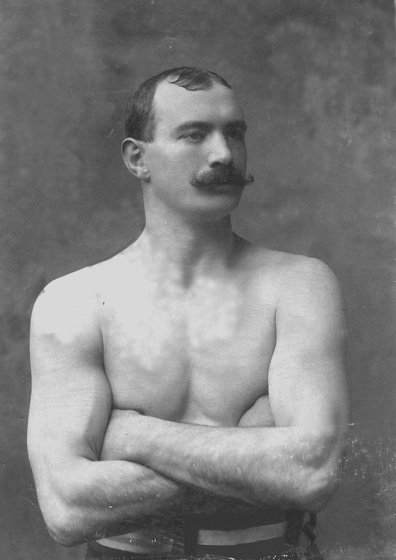

Personal information
- Nickname: The Irish Giant
- Nationality: Irish
- Born: Peter Maher; 16 March 1869 Gunnode, Tuam, Galway, Ireland
- Died: 22 July 1940 (aged 71)
- Height: 5 ft 11 1/2 in (1.82 m)
- Weight: Middleweight; Heavyweight

Boxing career
- Reach: 74 in (188 cm)
- Stance: Orthodox

Boxing record
- Total fights: 177
- Wins: 142
- Win by KO: 107
- Losses: 28
- Draws: 6
- No contests: 1

Peter Maher (born 16 March 1869, in Gunnode, Tuam, County Galway, Ireland – 22 July 1940 in Baltimore, Maryland) was an Irish boxer known for his powerful punch. Early in his career, Maher won the Middleweight Championship of Ireland in 1888, and then later the Heavyweight Championship of Ireland in 1890. After moving to the United States, he claimed the Heavyweight Championship of the World in 1895 by knocking out Steve O'Donnell in the first round. In 1896, Bob Fitzsimmons defeated Maher in a fight in Coahuila de Zaragoza, Mexico, taking his disputed heavyweight title claims.

== Notable bouts ==
| Result | Opponent | Type | Rd., Time | Date | Location | Notes |
|---|---|---|---|---|---|---|
| Loss | (United States) Kid McCoy | KO | 2 (6) | 1908-07-24 | (United States) Sulzer Park, New York City | |
| Loss | (Republic of Ireland) George Gardner | KO | 1 (6) | 1903-04-06 | (United States) Monarch AC, Boston, Massachusetts | |
| Loss | (United States) Joe Choynski | KO | 2 (6) | 1903-01-26 | (United States) Washington S.C., Philadelphia, Pennsylvania | |
| Loss | (United States) Philadelphia Jack O'Brien | NWS | 6 | 1902-10-30 | (United States) Washington S.C., Philadelphia, Pennsylvania | |
| Loss | (United States) Philadelphia Jack O'Brien | NWS | 6 | 1902-10-03 | (United States) Ariel A.C., Philadelphia, Pennsylvania | |
| NC | (Republic of Ireland) Tom Sharkey | NC | 3 (6) | 1902-01-17 | (United States) Industrial Hall, Philadelphia, Pennsylvania | |
| Loss | (United States) Joe Choynski | PTS | 6 | 1900-02-16 | (United States) 2nd Regiment Armory, Chicago, Illinois | |
| Loss | (United States) Kid McCoy | KO | 5 (25) | 1900-01-01 | (United States) Coney Island Stadium, Brooklyn, New York | |
| Win | (Australia) Joe Goddard | RTD | 8 (8) | 1898-07-08 | (United States) Lenox A.C., New York City | |
| Loss | (Australia) Joe Goddard | KO | 1 (6) | 1898-05-13 | (United States) Arena A.C., Philadelphia, Pennsylvania | |
| Draw | (Republic of Ireland) Tom Sharkey | PTS | 7 | 1897-06-09 | (United States) Palace A.C., New York City | |
| Win | (United States) Joe Choynski | KO | 6 (20) | 1896-11-16 | (United States) Broadway A.C., New York City | |
| Loss | (United Kingdom) Bob Fitzsimmons | KO | 1, 1:35 | 1896-02-21 | (Mexico) Coahuila de Zaragoza | Lost World Heavyweight Title. |
| Draw | (Australia) Jim Hall | PTS | 6 | 1895-02-22 | (United States) Suffolk A.C., Boston, Massachusetts | |
| NC | (Canada) Mysterious Billy Smith | ND | 3 | 1895-02-13 | (United States) Lynn, Massachusetts | |
| Win | (Canada) George Godfrey | KO | 6 | 1894-05-28 | (United States) Boston Casino, Boston, Massachusetts | |
| Loss | (Australia) Joe Goddard | KO | 3 (20) | 1892-12-08 | (United States) Coney Island Stadium, Brooklyn, New York | |
| Loss | (United Kingdom) Bob Fitzsimmons | RTD | 12 | 1892-03-02 | (United States) Olympic Club, New Orleans, Louisiana | |
| Loss | (Australia) Peter Jackson | RTD | 3 (4) | 1889-12-24 | (Republic of Ireland) Leinster Hall, Dublin | |

== See also ==
- List of bare-knuckle boxers

Titles in pretence
| Vacant Title last held by Jake Kilrain | World Heavyweight Champion; 11 November 1895 – 21 February 1896 | Succeeded by Bob Fitzsimmons |
