= Billy McCarthy (boxer) =

Australian boxer

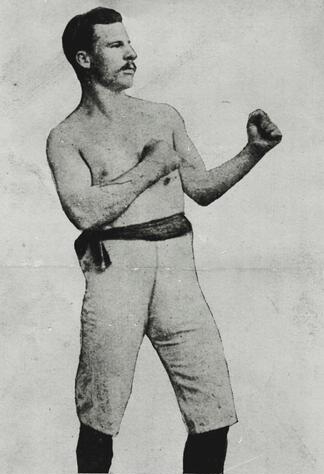
- McCarthy in the 1890s
- Born: William Patrick McCarthy; August 8, 1854; Poplar, London, England
- Died: October 28, 1931 (aged 77); Lidcombe, Sydney, Australia
- Spouse: Ada Gardner (m. 1887; div. 1908)
- Children: 8
- Boxing career
- Nicknames: Bluey; Professor
- Height: 5 ft 6½ in
- Weight: Middleweight
- Stance: Orthodox

Boxing record
- Total fights: 57
- Wins: 23
- Win by KO: 16
- Losses: 19
- Draws: 15

William Patrick "Billy" McCarthy (August 8, 1854 – October 28, 1931) was an English-born Australian professional boxer who was also known by the nicknames "Bluey" and "Professor", who competed from 1886 to 1901 and was the Australian middleweight boxing champion in 1891, after defeating Jim Hall.

== Early life and interest in boxing ==
Billy McCarthy was born on August 8, 1854, in Poplar, London and is of Irish descent. When he was old enough, he assisted his father, who was a stevedore, in his business until the age of 21. It was then when he became a seaman aboard a sailing ship, and occasionally did four-round sparring sessions at Bill Richardson's Hotel in Shoreditch, and in India he won fights under the London Prize Ring Rules against Bill Pope, Tom Jenkins and Anthony Olsen.

After eight years as a seaman he went back to stevedoring, of which he soon grew tired of, and took a ship to Australia where he arrived in Williamstown, Victoria in 1881. There he was employed in multiple ways such as road-making, harvesting and gold digging. He then made his way to Sydney where he was employed to clean the Brush Farm for more than a year and later worked as a hod carrier for several new buildings. He had also joined the gold rush in Parkes, New South Wales which in his own words "proved a duffer", and made him return to Sydney.

== Boxing career ==
=== 1886–1887 Early career ===
In search for fame and fortune in 1883, he first thought of boxing as a career, which was prompted by his meeting with Peter Jackson at "Darky" Green's restaurant in Bathurst Street. He expressed his desire to become a boxer to Jackson, which led to a private meeting arranged with Jackson's pupil Tom Meadows, where they fought with Meadows going down after two rounds. With Jackson being impressed by his performance he insisted on McCarthy joining his School situated at Charlie Rickett's Light House Hotel, which he agreed to. There after a quarter's tuition, he had his first public fight, sparring with Jim Ryan for four rounds. After some onlookers expressed the opinion that McCarthy may be a better fighter than Billy Smith, who was Jackson's favorite fighter, they arranged a private fight at Foley's Hall (Note: Then called the White Horse Hall.) with £50 put aside, and after eleven rounds, McCarthy won by knockout.

McCarthy debuted his first professional fight at Foley's Hall on April 10, 1886, against Billy Smith which ended in a newspaper decision draw.

=== 1888 Victoria Theatre tournament ===
In early 1888, after fighting two draws with Martin "Buffalo" Costello and Bob Fitzsimmons, he entered a middleweight division of tournament at Victoria Theatre in Newcastle promoted by Mick Mororey. The first bout of the middleweight division was between McCarthy and Smith on February 20, with Jackson as the referee, with the first round being described as ending equal. In the second round, McCarthy was described as receiving "the most punishment", though in the third and fourth round both fighters were "giving and taking heavy punishment" with the judges giving their decision in favor of McCarthy.

The second bout of the tournament was left between Paddy Gorman, Jack Malloy and McCarthy, with Gorman retiring from the tournament the bout was left between McCarthy and Molloy. After a few rounds of the bout, Molloy had retired leading McCarthy to be the winner of the tournament. Sometime during the evening, Smith who had previously lost to McCarthy in the tournament challenged him to a contest, which led to them fighting three bouts at Foley's Hall with all ending as draws in April of that year.

=== 1889–1890 Fights in San Francisco ===
On June 11, 1889, it was announced that McCarthy would be making his way to America on the 12th, aboard the Alameda with Harry Morse as captain. He would first spar for three rounds with Frank Allen of New York, to prove his boxing abilities. Allen was described as having "stood no show with McCarthy", and that McCarthy "could strike him whenever he pleased". He then fought George Kessler and Joe Choynski, each of which ended in no-decision.

On September 6, it was announced that McCarthy would be fighting Denny Kelleher at the Californian Athletic Club with Queensbury rules governing on November 21, for a purse of $1,800, of which $300 goes to the loser. In the first two rounds McCarthy took the aggressive, and knocked Kelleher down in the third round. McCarthy continued to push Kelleher around the ring the following rounds until the sixteenth round with Kelleher responding with weak punches, but it would even out until in the twenty-first round as McCarthy knocked out Kelleher.

It was first announced by the Pittsburgh Dispatch on December 1, that McCarthy would be facing Nonpareil Dempsey at the Californian Athletic Club for a purse of $1,800, which was noted to be unusually low for Dempsey's standards. A couple days later the fight was then said to be for the world middleweight boxing championship and was scheduled for January. On January 21, 1890, it was announced that the fight would be postponed to February 18 due to Dempsey having caught an illness. The fight lasted 28 rounds and was said to be evenly matched until the 19th round, where McCarthy was described as being "distressed" and was repeatedly struck down in the 26th round with Dempsey advising him to give up to which McCarthy refused. Eventually in the 28th round, McCarthy was retired by his second Paddy Gorman leading Dempsey to retain his title of world middleweight champion.

After his fight with Dempsey, McCarthy was originally scheduled to face "Reddy" Gallagher, though this bout was cancelled due to Gallagher catching Malaria. As a replacement, McCarthy would face fellow Australian Bob Fitzsimmons on May 29, for a purse of $1,250. Most of the rounds of the bout had been in favor of Fitzsimmons due to his height and long reach, which eventually led to McCarthy's defeat in the ninth round after being unable to continue due to a knockdown. After the fight it was reported that Fitzsimmons had given McCarthy a present of $100.

=== 1891 Australian middleweight boxing champion ===
McCarthy had been called the "middle-weight champion of Australia" as early as 1886, but was never promoted as it. Due to there being a question concerning who's the middleweight champion of Australia, there was a tournament organized by Larry Foley in 1887, which had been open for everyone to compete, where he defeated Jim "Ironbark" Burge after 17 rounds, winning the title, though he again was never challenged for it as an official title.

After his return to Australia aboard the Royal mail steamship Cuzco in 1891, McCarthy had his first official fight for the Australian middlweight championship against the then champion Jim Hall on January 19. The bout went 8 rounds with judge Curran scoring for Hall, while judge Goddard and the referee Virgoe scored for McCarthy, resulting in an upset win and leading him to be the new Australian middleweight champion.

His first and only defence of the title was against Jim "Ironbark" Burge which was fought on April 6, and resulted in an upset victory for McCarthy. The title was soon after vacated in May 1891, after McCarthy made his way back to America.

== Works cited ==
- "Billy McCarthy Laid To Rest". Sydney: The Daily Telegraph. October 31, 1931. p. 3.
- "Billy McCarthy Chats of Bygone Days". Melbourne: The Sporting Globe. August 27, 1930. p. 11.
- "The Billy M'Carthy Fund". Sydney: Saturday Referee and the Arrow. June 17, 1916. p. 7.
- "Regarding Old Jim Burge—Billy McCarthy's Offer". Sydney: The Referee. August 4, 1909. p. 8.
- "Billy McCarthy Passes". Melbourne: The Sporting Globe. November 2, 1931. p. 14.
- "Ring Reminiscences In The Days of The Big Men". Sydney: Saturday Referee and the Arrow. May 3, 1913. pp. 1–6.
- "Foley's Athletic Hall". Sydney: The Evening News. April 12, 1886. p. 3.
- "Champion Boxing Tournament". Newcastle: The Newcastle Herald. February 21, 1888. p. 8.
- "Boxing Tournament". Newcastle: The Newcastle Herald. February 22, 1888. p. 5.
- "Boxing Tournament". Perth: Truth. February 17, 1907. p. 6.
- "Sporting". Adelaide: The Advertiser. December 28, 1886. p. 7.
- "Notes". Grafton: The Daily Examiner. June 11, 1889. p. 7.
- "Professor McCarthy at the Californian Club". Sydney: The Australian Star. August 22, 1889. p. 7.
- "Jack Dempsey Knocked Out By George La Blanche". New York City: The Evening World. August 28, 1889. p. 1.
- "Denny Kelleher Has Been Matched to Meet Prof. Billy McCarthy". Pittsburgh: Pittsburgh Dispatch. September 7, 1889. p. 7.
- "Denny Kelleher Knocked Out by Billy McCarthy at San Francisco". Winona: Winona Daily Republican. November 21, 1889. p. 4.
- "The Leading Pugilists". Pittsburgh: Pittsburgh Dispatch. December 1, 1889. p. 6.
- "Dempsey and Billy McCarthy to Fight". Defiance, Ohio: Defiance County Republican and Express. December 13, 1889. p. 6.
- "Little Fears". Fort Wayne, Indiana: Fort Wayne Sentinel. January 21, 1889. p. 5.
- "Dempsey and M'Carthy". Rockhampton: The Daily Northern Argus. February 22, 1890. p. 6.
- "Dempsey and M'Carthy". Brooklyn: The Brooklyn Daily Eagle. February 19, 1890. p. 1.
- "A New Australian Arrival Takes Reddy Gallagher's Place Against Billy McCarthy". Kansas City, Missouri: Kansas City Journal. May 25, 1890. p. 13.
- "A Fight Off". Washington, D.C.: Evening Star. May 25, 1890. p. 9.
- "McCarthy Defeated". Spokane, Washington: Spokane Daily Chronicle. May 30, 1890. p. 2.
- "The Ring". Sydney: Evening News. January 8, 1891. p. 5.
- "Jim Hall and Billy M'Carthy". Melbourne: The Sportsman. January 14, 1891. p. 2.
- "Jim Hall Whipped". Sydney: The Referee. January 21, 1891. p. 6.
- "Broken Hill Athletic Notes". Melbourne: The Sportsman. April 8, 1891. p. 2.
- "Odd Sporting Notes in Sydney". Young, New South Wales: The Burrangong Argus. May 27, 1891. p. 3.

Preceded by Jim Hall	Australian Middleweight Championship; 19 January 1891 – May 1891	Succeeded by Dan Creedon
