= Bob Fitzsimmons vs. Tom Sharkey =

Boxing competition

Fitzsimmons vs. Sharkey
- Date: December 2, 1896
- Venue: Mechanics' Pavilion; San Francisco, California
- Title(s) on the line: Heavyweight Champion

Tale of the tape
Boxer	Bob Fitzsimmons	Tom Sharkey
Nickname	Ruby Robert and The Freckled Wonder	Sailor Tom
Hometown	Helston, Cornwall	Dundalk, Ireland
Pre-fight record	53 – 6 – 14 (6 NC) (46 KOs)	20 – 2 – 3 (1 NC) (19 KOs)
Height	5 ft 11 1/2 in (1.82 m)	5 ft 8 in (1.73 m)
Recognition		Heavyweight Champion (disputed)

Result
- Sharkey wins by eighth-round disqualification

The Fitzsimmons vs Sharkey Heavyweight Championship boxing match between Bob Fitzsimmons and Tom Sharkey was awarded by referee Wyatt Earp to Sharkey after Fitzsimmons knocked Sharkey to the mat. Earp ruled that Fitzsimmons had hit Sharkey below the belt, but very few witnessed the purported foul. The fans at the December 2, 1896, fight in San Francisco booed Earp's decision. It was the first heavyweight championship fight since James J. Corbett, the prior champion, had retired from boxing the year before. The fight may have been the most anticipated fight in the US that year.

The match was illegal under city law, but civic and police officials who attended the match along with the public bet heavily in Fitzsimmons' favor. Virtually no one agreed with Earp's ruling and Fitzsimmons' managers went to court to prevent Sharkey from obtaining the purse. The judge ruled that since the match was illegal the court had no standing, allowing Sharkey to claim the prize. After Corbett ended his retirement the next year he was the de facto champion, but he fought Fitzsimmons and lost.

Earp was pilloried for his decision by the public and popular press, who vilified him and accused him of accepting a payoff to throw the match. The story about the fight and Earp's contested decision was reprinted nationwide. Earp left San Francisco soon after and when he died in 1929, he was perhaps more well known for his decision in the title fight than his actions at the O.K. Corral gun fight. In 1905, Dr. B. Brookes Lee confirmed the fight had been fixed and confessed he had treated Sharkey so it would appear that he had been fouled, although it is unclear whether Earp had prior knowledge of the scam.

== Background ==
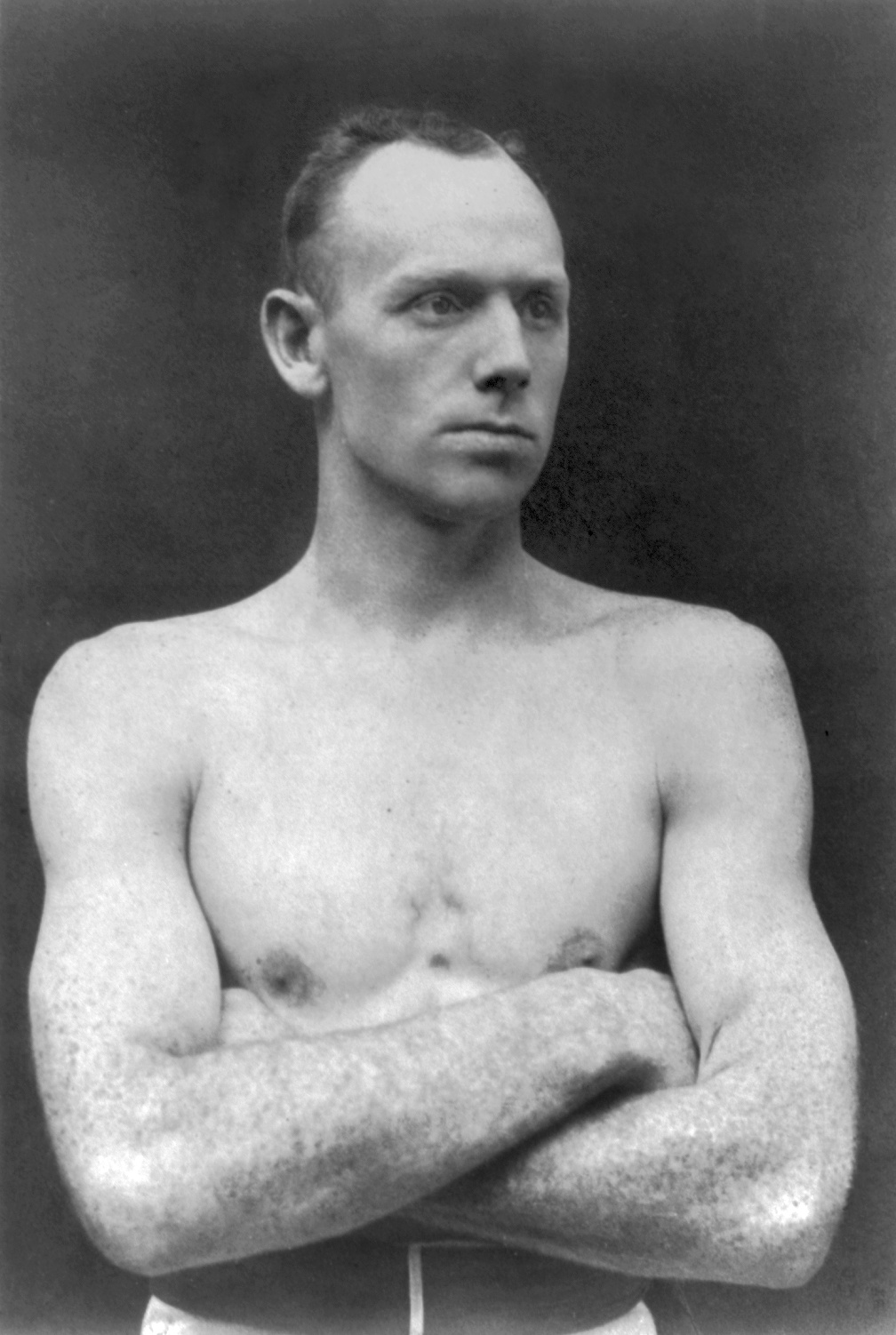
Bob Fitzsimmons

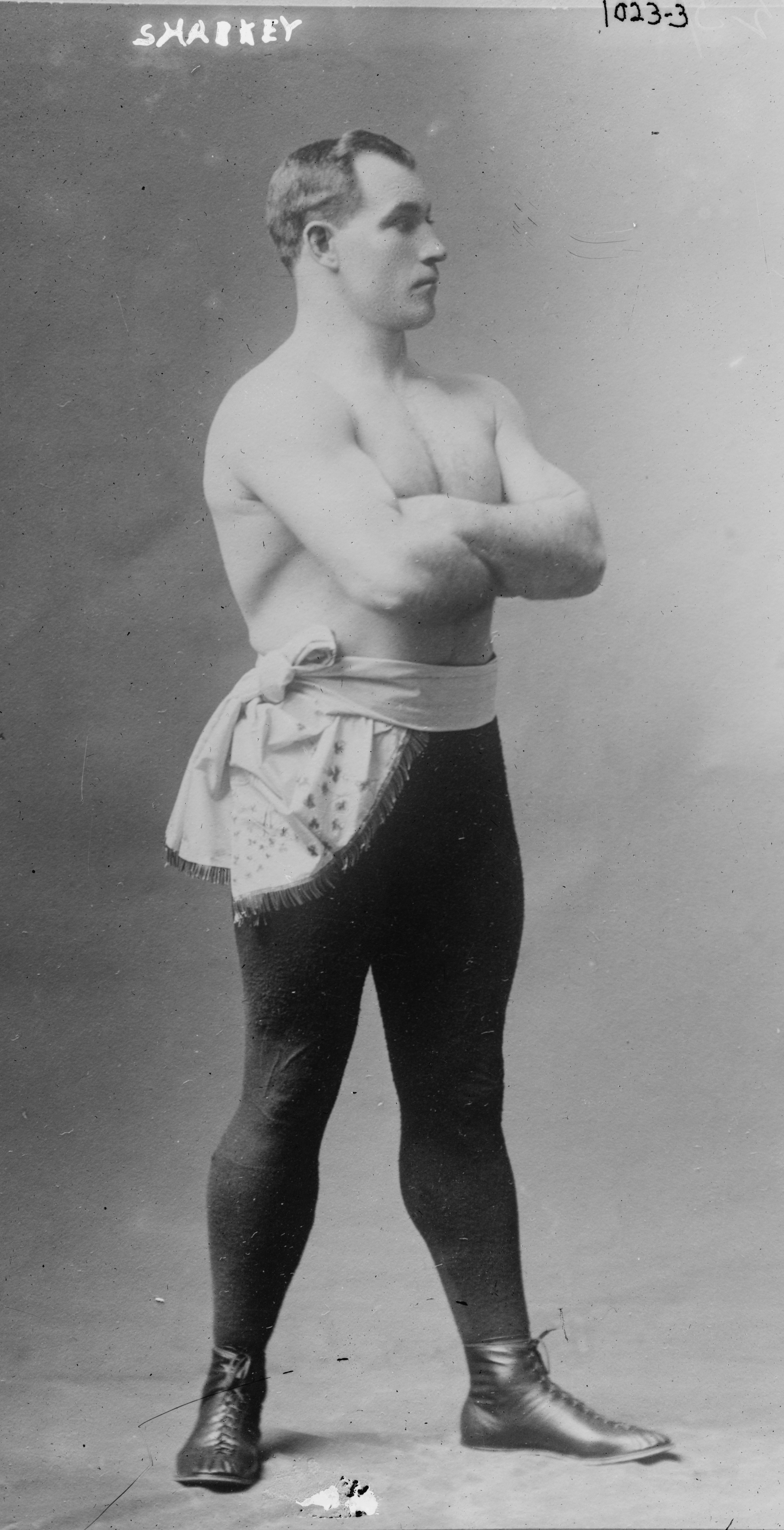
Tom Sharkey

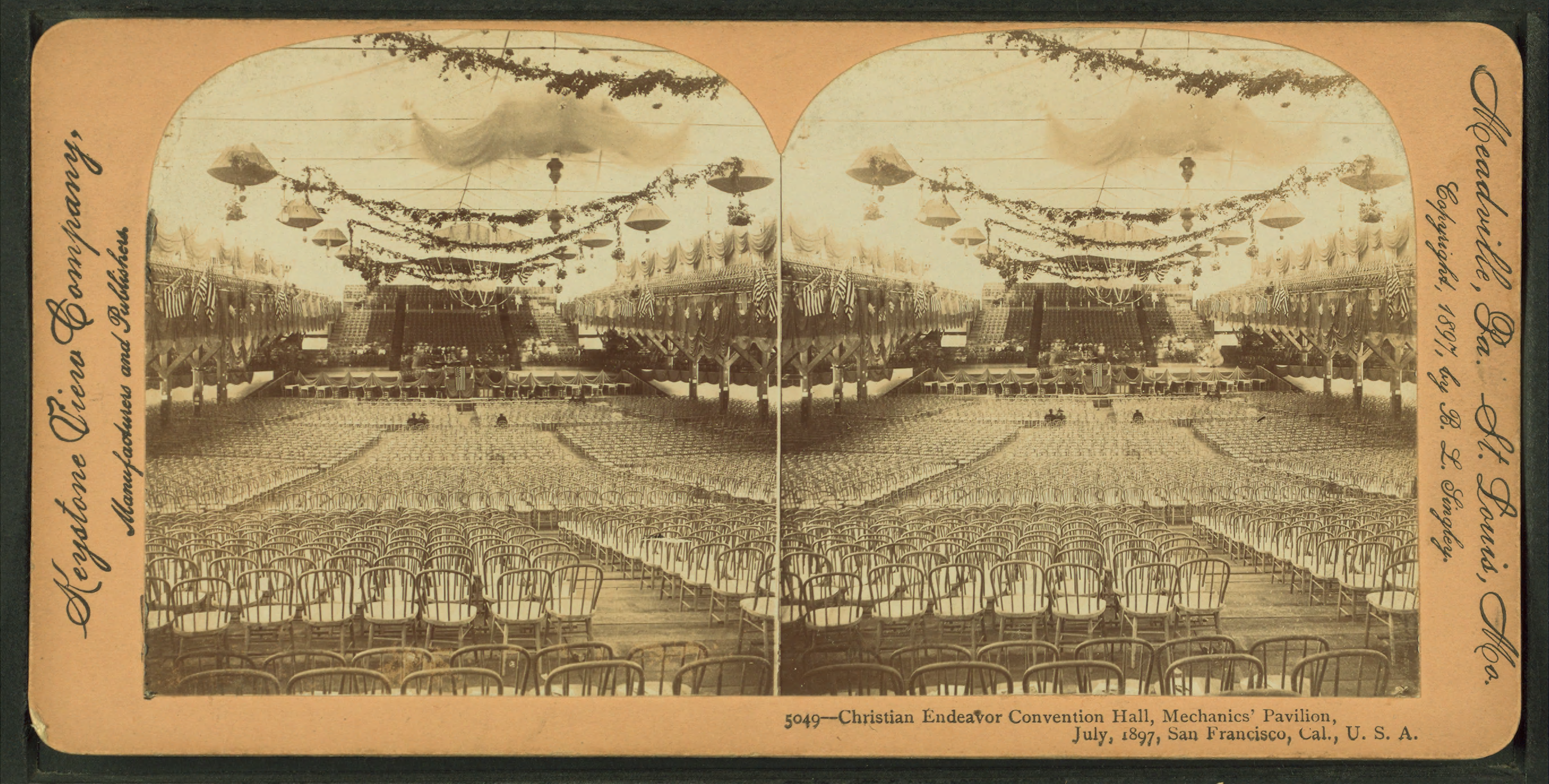
The interior of the San Francisco Mechanics Pavilion in 1897

In 1896, James J. Corbett, the first heavyweight champion crowned under the Marquess of Queensberry Rules, hadn't defended his title in three years. In November 1895, Corbett gave up the championship to play the role of Ned Cornell, a boxer, in the play A Naval Cadet. He lived in San Francisco and promoted his protege, Australian Steve O'Donnell, as the next candidate for the heavyweight title, but he had been knocked out within the first minute by Peter Maher, who in turn was knocked out in the first round by Bob Fitzsimmons.

At the time of the fight, Sharkey was unbeaten in 24 trips to the ring with 20 knockouts. He had already fought Corbett on June 24, 1896, in San Francisco, but the match was ruled a draw after four rounds due to police interference.

Promoter Jim Coffroth promoted the match between Fitzsimmons and Sharkey as the World Heavyweight Championship. Although boxing was illegal, the fight between Fitzsimmons and Sharkey was very popular, and the title fight was attended by city and police officials who bet on the outcome like everyone else. Nationwide, the public believed Fitzsimmons would win. In the days prior to the fight, Fitzsimmons was favored 3/1, until a late surge of betting on Sharkey dropped the odds to 3/2. Suffragettes protested that the fight was restricted to men and successfully got the ban on women removed.

=== Wyatt Earp selected as referee ===
During the previous summer the San Francisco Examiner had run on three consecutive Sundays a ghostwritten series of articles under Earp's byline, written in the first-person, posturing Earp as virtually the sole reason law and order had come to the Old West. The Hearst family, owners of the Examiner, had hired Earp to provide security to their family and specifically for Andy Lawrence, the managing editor of the newspaper, during a visit to Tombstone. Lawrence had acquired the nickname of "Long Green" because of his ability to turn a shady dollar and made many enemies as a result, requiring Earp's services. Earp had refereed 30 or so matches in earlier days, though not under the Marquess of Queensberry rules, and he had never refereed a match of national prominence.

Fight promoters John D. Gibbs and J. J. Groom of the National Athletic Club were unable to find a referee that both sides could agree on. Fitzsimmon's manager, knowing that his boxer was heavily favored to win, rejected all of the names, thinking that the fight had been fixed in Sharkey's favor.

Gibbs told the San Francisco Call that he spotted Wyatt Earp in the Baldwin Hotel in San Francisco. "I knew that Wyatt Earp was a cool, clear-headed person of unimpeachable reputation, and one who would be perfectly fair to both fighters." He called Earp "the bravest fighter, squarest gambler, best friend and worst enemy ever known on the frontier." Even then, the Fitzsimmons side fought against the choice until the very last minute. The San Francisco Call told a different version of the story, that Lawrence, managing editor of the competing newspaper The Examiner, had suggested Earp to Gibbs. In a personal visit to the offices of The Call, Groom and Gibbs delivered a letter in which they denied that Lawrence played a role in choosing Earp. They stated that they had only met Earp once, when he visited Fitszimmons' training quarters about 10 days before the match. When both Sharkey's and Fitszimmons' managers would not agree on a referee, they chose Earp on the day of the fight because he was "reported to be fearless, cool and honest." They declared that they had sought Earp out in the Baldwin Hotel that afternoon and made the arrangements at that time.

The Fitzsimmons camp strongly resisted Earp as referee, but with no alternative, finally yielded, knowing that 15,000 people had paid between $2 and $10 for tickets.

In the afternoon, the Oakland Tribune ran a front-page story praising Earp as the choice for referee. "Wyatt Earp is one of the bravest and best known sporting men in the country. He has had a varied experience since he retired from office in Arizona and is now in the horse racing business. He is the owner of Don Gara, the horse that started at 100 to 1 and won at the Oakland track the other day."

== Fight controversy ==
Earp had learned gambling and boxing when he was a young man in the towns that were built in advance of the Union Pacific Railroad. He developed a reputation officiating boxing matches and refereed a fight between John Shanssey and Mike Donovan on July 4, 1869, in Cheyenne, Wyoming in front of about 3000 people.

But he had until this time refereed fights under the older London Prize Ring Rules, which allowed bare-knuckled brawling and a broad range of fighting techniques including holds and throws of the opponent. The new Marquess of Queensberry Rules were designed to eliminate some of the underhanded elements of boxing matches.

Earp was a controversial choice, and he gained instant notoriety before the fight started when he entered the ring carrying his customary .45 caliber pistol in his coat pocket. Police Captain Charles Whitman, watching the match from ringside, climbed into the ring and demanded Earp hand over his pistol, which Earp promptly gave up.

Fitzsimmons was taller and quicker than Sharkey and dominated the fight from the opening bell. In the eighth, the two were punching at such close quarters that virtually no one witnessed the hits the two men exchanged clearly. What was obvious to everyone watching was that Fitzsimmons hit Sharkey with his famous "solar plexus punch," an uppercut that struck under the opponent's heart and could temporarily leave the opponent helpless. Different sources describe the alleged foul. In the much-criticized and disputed biography Wyatt Earp: Frontier Marshal, Stuart N. Lake wrote that Sharkey "stumbled forward instead of back. Fitzsimmons' right, coming up, struck Sharkey in the groin." Sharkey later testified Fitzsimmons hit him below the belt. Sharkey went down, clutched his groin, and rolled on the canvas, screaming foul.

=== Earp stops fight ===
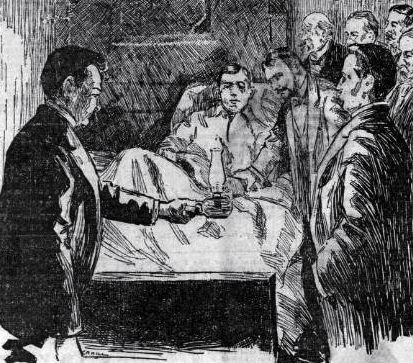
Sharkey in bed surrounded by doctors

Wyatt Earp c. 1902 in Nome, Alaska, with long-time friend and former Tombstone mayor and editor John Clum

Earp stopped the bout, and after conferring with both corners for more than 30 seconds, ruled that Fitzsimmons had hit Sharkey below the belt, a violation of the Marquess of Queensberry Rules. His decision disqualified Fitzsimmons and Earp handed the check for the prize money to Sharkey's second. College student and future novelist William MacLeod Raine happened to be in San Francisco. Until he saw Earp in the ring, he'd never heard of him. Raine later reported,

Fitzsimmons knocked Sharkey all over the ring for eight rounds and then landed one to his solar plexus. Sharkey went down and out. Earp walked across to the prostrate man and raised his hand as the victor. There was a moment of silence and then a burst of resentment from thousands of throats.

Another report said Earp left without raising the hand of the winning boxer. The crowd noise was so loud that most didn't hear Earp render his decision giving the fight to the downed Sharkey. Many only figured out something was wrong when Earp slipped between the ropes and headed for the exit.

His ruling was greeted with loud boos and catcalls. San Francisco Examiner reporter Edward H. Hamilton wrote "The information became general by a slow trickling process, and tier to tier so that by the time the full significance of the situation had reached the throng, Earp was gone."

Very few thought that the punch Earp called was a foul. Sharkey's attendants carried him out as "limp as a rag". The public loudly protested the decision and it was widely believed that there had been no foul and Earp had bet on Sharkey. The public had bet heavily on Fitzsimmons and they were livid at the outcome.

=== Fitzsimmons gets injunction ===
"Sailor" Tom Sharkey's manager D. J. Lynch went to the Anglo California National Bank the day after the fight and attempted to cash the certified check for the purse of $14,700 (about $569,000 today). But Fitzsimmons had obtained an injunction against distributing the prize money to Sharkey until the courts could determine who the rightful winner was. Bank manager Philip Lilienthal told Lynch that the bank's attorney had advised him he could not pay the check until the issue was resolved in court.

=== Bets are paid off ===
Despite the accusations of a fix, the bookmakers paid off bets on the fight based on Earp's decision as final.

=== The Call cries foul ===
The two main newspapers in town were on opposite sides of the debate. The Examiner supported Earp, but the San Francisco Call unrelentingly attacked Earp's character, both directly and indirectly. They devoted almost all of their front page on December 5 to the fight. They reported that Danny Needham, Sharkey's trainer, had sent telegrams to a number of friends in San Francisco and other cities, saying: "Bet all you have got on Sharkey to win." They accused Lawrence of The Examiner as having been in on the fix.

Men foremost in the community, of undoubted integrity and veracity—not a few of such men, but hundreds of them—have denounced and continue to denounce the decision as one of the most bare-faced robberies that has ever been perpetrated in this State under the guise of sport.

The Call mocked Earp, describing how Earp had gone into the ring "...with a Navy revolver a foot long sticking out of his hip pocket," and that Police Captain Wittman "...took a murderous-looking revolver from him in the prize ring in Mechanics' Pavilion." They described Earp as a gunslinger: "His past mode of making a livelihood by the use of his 'gun' has been told. He has been a man who has shot down people innumerable, wiped the smoke from off the barrel of his shotgun and cut another notch in the butt, and said 'What a great man am I.'"

=== Judgments against Earp ===
On December 4, 1896, Earp appeared in court to face a charge of carrying a concealed weapon. He explained that he always wore a gun as a precaution in the event he met someone he had sent to prison, and because he was carrying a large amount of cash. He later paid a $50 fine. On December 8, a sheriff deputy put a lien on two horses Earp owned for $170.45 for a debt allegedly owed to J. G. Swinnerton of Stockton. Another lawsuit was filed on December 9 by J. H. Levenson of Tombstone, who claimed Earp owed two notes totaling $1110.79, 19 years after leaving Arizona.

The San Francisco district attorney threatened to convene a grand jury. A panel appointed by mayor Washington Bartlett learned that the racehorses Earp was reputed to own were leased, and that he owed $2,121 (about $82,083 today) to a loan company. They also received information that his wife Josephine Earp was a "degenerate horseplayer" and that she frequently took loans out against her jewelry. When asked in court if he had any property, Earp replied, "Nothing, except the clothes on my back."

=== Earp lampooned by press ===
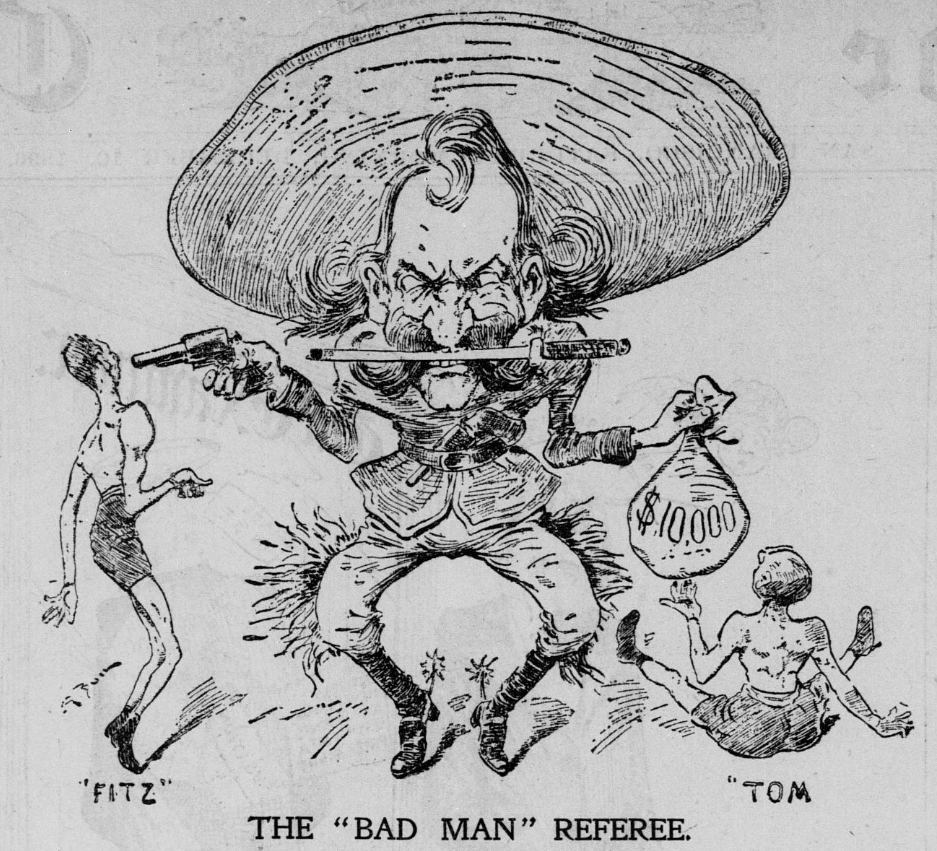
A caricature of Earp from The New York Herald mocking him after the Sharkey-Fitzimmons fight. The image dogged him the rest of his life.

Over the next month, the local newspapers ran dozens of stories about the controversy and the two major local papers took sides. The Examiner, owned by the Hearst family who had briefly hired Earp as a bodyguard when Hearst visited Tombstone, sided with their man. The San Francisco Call pilloried Earp, running a number of extremely critical stories about him. They lampooned and scrutinized Wyatt for a full month, challenging his integrity, questioning his honesty, and thoroughly vilifying him, insisting he was either blind or a fool. They accused Earp of having a financial interest in the outcome.

Earp was parodied in a caricature by The New York Herald as a "cackling, washed-up ruffian pointing a gun at Fitzsimmons with his right hand while slipping a bag of cash to Sharkey with the left", wearing a sombrero with a knife in his teeth. It was reprinted in The San Francisco Call on December 12, 1896. The image and the attacks by the press dogged him the rest of his life.

The stories in newspapers in San Francisco, Los Angeles, and San Diego were reproduced nationwide and read by a public that knew only that Wyatt Earp had been involved in the shootout in Tombstone. A reporter hunted up Bill Buzzard, a miner of dubious reputation from Idaho that Earp had confronted in an Idaho claim jumping feud in 1884, and wrote a story that accused Wyatt of being the brains behind lot-jumping and a real-estate fraud, further tarnishing his reputation.

On December 14, 1896, the San Francisco Call quoted a story from the New York Journal by Alfred H. Lewis, "who knew the 'bad men' in Arizona. He said that the Earps in Tombstone were "stage robbers" who "stood up stages and plundered express companies for a livelihood... The Earps, Wyatt, Virgil, Warren and Julian, had treated themselves to many a killing... Warren Earp, who was a stage-company guard, meekly put his hands over his head.... it was from all standpoints a family affair on the part of the Earps. Often they got as high as $25,000.... Virgil, as marshal, would enlist Wyatt, Warren and Julian, together with Curly Bill, their cousin, and hunt the hold-ups."

== Court testimony ==
Newspaper accounts and testimony over the next two weeks revealed a conspiracy among the boxing promoters to fix the fight's outcome. On December 4, the newspapers reported in depth on the fight and growing reports of a fix. Police Commissioner Mose Gunst told the San Francisco Call that he saw plenty of evidence on the street the afternoon before the fight that betting was suddenly favoring Sharkey. The Call also reported that Dr. B. Brookes Lee, who treated Sharkey shortly after the fight, was not a legitimate physician. They reported that he had been arrested when he visited a San Francisco bank and attempted to cash a bond stolen from a Kansas City bank.

Gunst said he ran into Riley Grannan, then known as one of gambling's biggest "plungers" (or reckless gambler) nationwide, who told him that Earp had been "fixed."

Oakland Judge Sanderson took testimony beginning on December 9. Dr. D. D. Lustig, a San Francisco physician and the National Athletic Club medical examiner, testified that he attempted to visit Sharkey in his dressing room immediately after the fight but was barred access. He said he had only been able to visit Sharkey the next day, along with five other doctors, including Dr. B. Brookes Lee. They found cuts and bruises on his head and swelling and discoloration in his groin. The Sacramento Daily Union reprinted a story from San Francisco that reported that the swelling and discoloration could have been caused by "injecting any irritating fluid." When the other doctors learned that B. Brookes Lee was not a legitimate doctor, they resubmitted their examination of Sharkey, concluding that he didn't suffer an injury that might have caused the end of the bout.

On December 10, the Sacramento Daily Union reported that Billy Smith, Sharkey's trainer, had confessed that the two promoters, J. J. Groom and J. H. Gibbs, along with Danny Lynch (Sharkey's manager) and Sharkey created the "National Athletic Club" that sponsored the fight. Sharkey and his manager were set up to receive 20 per cent of the net proceeds. Lynch arranged for Earp to serve as referee, who agreed to give the fight to Sharkey the first time Fitzsimmons landed a close body blow, for which he was to receive $2,500. After the eighth round, Smith said they took Sharkey to his dressing room and then his hotel room, where Smith removed Sharkey's boxing shorts and noticed no discoloration. Dr. B. Brookes Lee arrived and treated Sharkey in private. When Smith returned to the room, he saw a bottle of potassium iodide. Smith visited Sharkey the next night and noticed that his groin was noticeably swollen. Groom, Gibbs and Lynch in turn said that Smith attempted to extort additional payment from them and when they refused, went to Fitzsimmons camp.

On the third day of testimony, Fitzsimmons testified that he had landed a left on Sharkey's face, and when Sharkey raised his hands to protect his face against another blow, Fitzsimmons hit him with his left in the stomach. When Sharkey dropped his hands, Fitzsimmons said he hit him with an uppercut when sent Sharkey to the floor. He said he never hit an illegal punch.

Sharkey's manager, D. J. Lynch, said he did not learn of Earp's selection as referee until 4:00 p.m. and denied knowing how Dr. Lee came to treat Sharkey. Julian said that Grannan told her he had overhead Earp and Joe Harvey, a bookmaker, in which Harvey said, "Then it's all right, is it?", and Earp replied, "You can depend on me." Harvey denied the accusations, and said he had bet only $600 on Sharkey. He told Police Commissioner Gunst, "Do you think that I would have bet only $600 if I had known the thing was 'fixed'? I would have either let the whole thing alone or else I'd bet $5000 to $6000 and won enough for a good Christmas present."

On December 16, Sharkey testified in court about the punch that ended the fight. "He gave me a left-hand jab to the mouth. Then he feinted with his left and sent his right hand across my head. I jumped back and he sent his left hand and hit me in the groin. As I was falling he hit me in the jaw. I was not insensible at any time."

Earp testified in his own defense, stating, "I was offered no money... to give an unfair decision. I would not have listened to a proposition of that kind to begin with, and everybody who knows me will not doubt my word."

=== Sharkey wins in court ===
Judge Sanderson finally ruled on December 17 that the hearsay evidence about the alleged fix was insufficient, and that the men engaging in the prizefight were "committing an offense against the law" and thus it was "not the sort of case for a court to consider." He said the contradictory testimony had not provided sufficient grounds for a decision. He granted the motion of Sharkey's counsel to dismiss the injunction. He said that the San Francisco supervisors had no right to license a boxing match, and that the license they issued was an illegal attempt to disobey the law. He told the lawyers that the promoters, the boxers, and their seconds had all broken the law and could be arrested. The bank refused to release all of the funds to Sharkey, withholding 15% due to an injunction. He collected $8,500 of the $10,000 prize money (approximately $387,000 today) but he was not widely accepted as the heavyweight title holder.

=== Later title fights ===
When Corbett ended his retirement in 1897 and resumed his fighting career, he was generally recognized as the still-reigning heavyweight champion. On March 17, 1897, in Carson City, Nevada, Fitzsimmons knocked Corbett out in round 14, gaining the heavyweight crown. Corbett, hoping to record a win that would put him in contention for the heavyweight title once again, met Sharkey again on November 22, 1898. Sharkey was on the verge of victory when Corbett's cornerman McVey entered the ring in the ninth round. Referee Kelly promptly declared all bets are off, disqualified Corbett, and awarded the bout to Sharkey. Fitzsimmons and Sharkey met again on July 24, 1900, and Fitzsimmons won with a knockout. That bout came after Fitzsimmons had lost the title to James J Jeffries in 1899

=== Fix reported eight years later ===
Eight years later, Dr. B. Brookes Lee was arrested in Portland, Oregon. He had been accused of treating Sharkey to make it appear that he had been fouled by Fitzsimmons. Lee said, "I fixed Sharkey up to look as if he had been fouled. How? Well, that is something I do not care to reveal, but I will assert that it was done—that is enough. There is no doubt that Fitzsimmons was entitled to the decision and did not foul Sharkey. I got $1,000 for my part in the affair." In December 1907, Lee was charged with murder after he was accused of stabbing a man in the eye. They were both apparently attracted to the same woman.

== Controversy follows Earp ==
The judge's decision provided no vindication for Earp. Until the fight, he had been a minor figure known regionally in California and Arizona. As a result of the fight and ensuing scandal, his name was known from coast to coast in the worst possible way. Earp left San Francisco shortly afterward and only returned when he caught a boat to Alaska. The fight was later described as "one of the gigantic fakes of the ring."

Just like the 30-second Gunfight at the O.K. Corral haunted Earp the rest of his life, the public never forgot his decision in the 1896 boxing match. Earp was dismayed about the controversy that continually followed him. He wrote a letter to John Hays Hammond on May 21, 1925, telling him "notoriety had been the bane of my life". When he died in 1929, he may have been as well known for his decision in the title fight as he was for his actions at the O.K. Corral gun fight.

His Associated Press obituary and others gave a lot of ink to his officiating of the Fitzsimmons-Sharkey fight. He was also described as a "gun-fighter, whose blazing six-shooters were, for most of his life, allied with the side of law and order". The Review-Atlas, the local paper from his birthplace in Monmouth, Illinois, printed a story on page one about Wyatt's death on January 13, 1929. It mentioned Earp's attempts to get into the movies but gave more attention to the Sharkey-Fitzsimmons scandal.

After he died, newspapers in the 1930s contained references to "pulling an Earp", or "Earping the job", which served as shorthand for a crooked referee.
