= Nonpareil Jack Dempsey =

Irish-American boxer

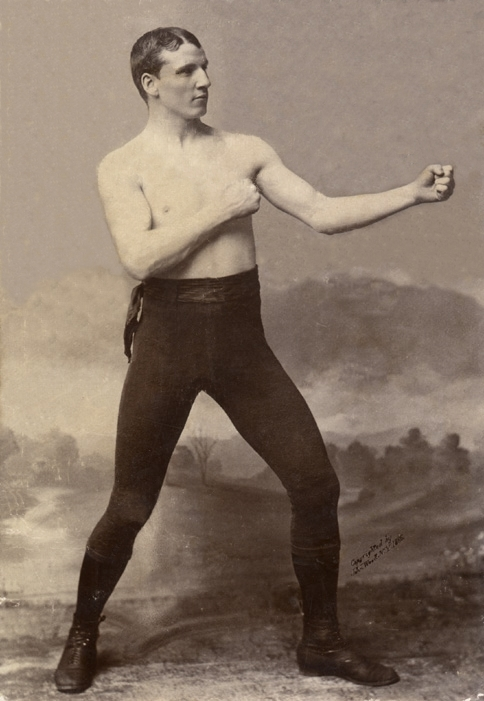

Personal information
- Nationality: American
- Born: John Edward Kelly; December 15, 1862 Curran, County Kildare, Ireland
- Died: November 1, 1895 (aged 32) Portland, Oregon, U.S.
- Height: 1.73 m (5 ft 8 in)
- Weight: Middleweight

Boxing career
- Stance: Orthodox

Boxing record
- Total fights: 69; with the inclusion of newspaper decisions
- Wins: 51 (official); 52 (unofficial)
- Win by KO: 24
- Losses: 3
- Draws: 11
- No contests: 3

John Edward Kelly (December 15, 1862 – November 1, 1895) was an Irish-born American boxer, better known as Nonpareil Jack Dempsey, who was the first holder of the World Middleweight Championship (1884–1891). He was nicknamed "Nonpareil" because of his reputation of being unbeatable.

== Biography ==
Dempsey was born on December 15, 1862, in Curragh, County Kildare, Ireland. He claimed the middleweight title on July 30, 1884, by defeating George Fulljames in Great Kills, Staten Island, New York. He held the title for over six years, defending the title against two fighters during the reign.

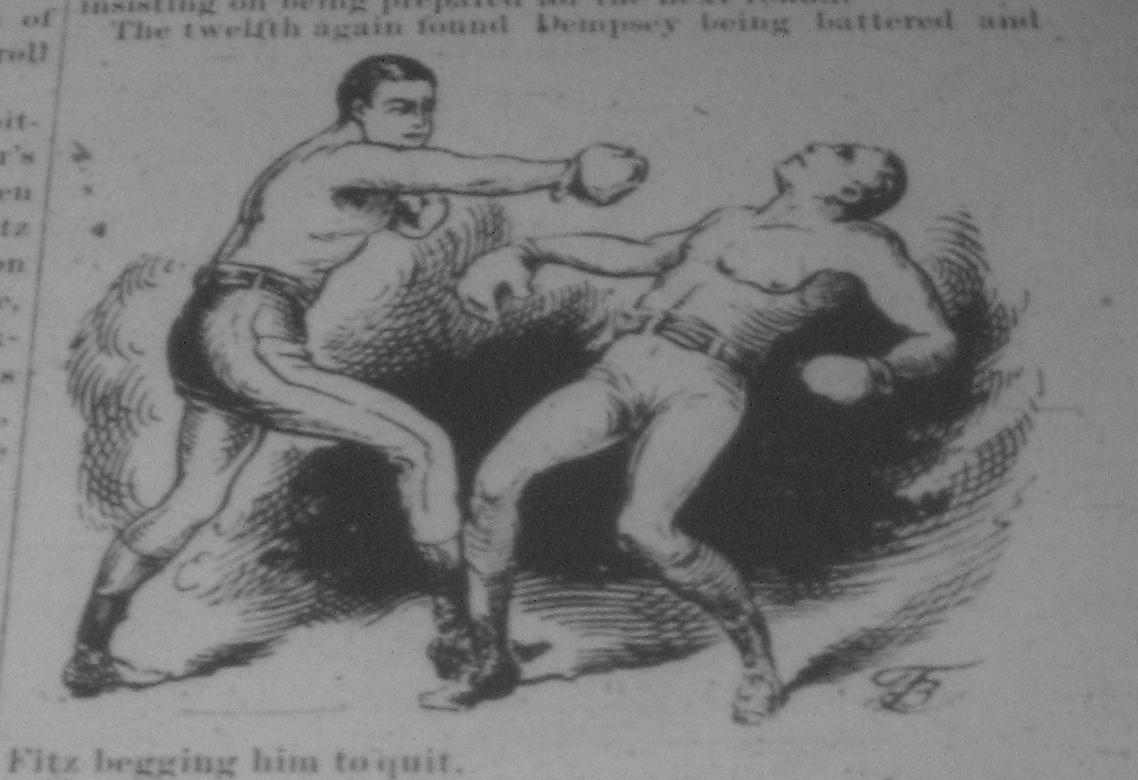
Fitzsimmons knocks down Dempsey in New Orleans, 1891.

In Dempsey's first 65 contests, he lost only once, in a non-title bout to George LaBlanche (a fighter he had beaten previously to cement his claim as middleweight champion) via a spinning backfist, a move that was later banned following Dempsey's death. He also faced Billy Baker in a 4-round bout that was fixed to have Baker win, though Baker failed to score a knockout, resulting in a no decision—Baker was later defeated by Dempsey on points in a rematch. His reign as middleweight champion ended when Bob Fitzsimmons pummeled him around the ring and begged him to concede before he was hurt any more. Dempsey, the reigning champion, would not give up; the fight continued and Fitzsimmons knocked him out in round 13. In his final bout, Dempsey, suffering from tuberculosis, lost to Tommy Ryan.

Though Dempsey beat his first battle with tuberculosis, he died at age 32 at the Portland, Oregon, home of his wife's parents on November 1, 1895, due to a recurrence of the disease. He was buried in an initially unmarked grave at Mount Calvary Cemetery. M. James Brady, Dempsey's father-in-law, refused to permit former World Champion John L. Sullivan and John S. Barnes to raise funds to erect a monument over Dempsey's grave. The family believed that a four-foot marble shaft was a sufficient memorial. The matter was thus dropped.

Dempsey was inducted into The Ring magazine Hall of Fame in 1954, and into the International Boxing Hall of Fame in 1992. The brothers Bernie and William Harrison Dempsey used his name as a pseudonym. And after the latter's success in the 1910s and 1920s he was usually mentioned with his nickname Nonpareil.

== Professional boxing record ==
69 fights	51 wins	3 losses
By knockout	24	3
By decision	27	0
Draws	11	
No contests	3	
Newspaper decisions/draws	1	

All newspaper decisions are regarded as "no decision" bouts as they have "resulted in neither boxer winning or losing, and would therefore not count as part of their official fight record."

No.	Result	Record	Opponent	Type	Round	Date	Location	Notes
69	Loss	51–3–11 (4)	(United States) Tommy Ryan	TKO	3 (15)	Jan 18, 1895	(United States) Sea Side A.C., Coney Island	
68	Draw	51–2–11 (4)	(United States) Billy McCarthy	PTS	20	Sep 5, 1895	(United States) Auditorium Club, New Orleans	
67	Win	51–2–10 (4)	(United States) Billy Keough	PTS	4	Feb 28, 1893	(United States) Pastime A.C., Portland	
66	Loss	50–2–10 (4)	(United Kingdom) Bob Fitzsimmons	RTD	13 (?)	Jan 14, 1891	(United States) California A.C., San Francisco	Lost world middleweight title
65	Win	50–1–10 (4)	(United Kingdom) Billy McCarthy	TKO	28 (?)	Feb 18, 1890	(United States) California A.C., San Francisco	Retained world middleweight title
64	Loss	49–1–10 (4)	(Canada) George LaBlanche	KO	32 (?)	Aug 27, 1889	(United States) California A.C., San Francisco	
63	Win	49–0–10 (4)	(United States) Mike Dempsey	KO	7 (?)	Aug 22, 1889	(United States) San Francisco	
62	Draw	48–0–10 (4)	(United States) Mike Donovan	PTS	6	Nov 15, 1888	(United States) Palace Rink, Williamsburg	
61	Win	48–0–9 (4)	(United States) James Stevens	PTS	4	Apr 23, 1888	(United States) Grand Theater, Williamsburg	
60	Win	47–0–9 (4)	(United States) Billy Baker	PTS	10	Feb 18, 1888	(United States) Adelphia Theatre, Buffalo	
59	Win	46–0–9 (4)	(United States) Dominick McCaffrey	PTS	10	Jan 31, 1888	(United States) Pavonia Rink, Jersey City	
58	Win	45–0–9 (4)	(United States) John Reagan	TKO	45 (?)	Dec 13, 1887	(United States) Long Island	
57	Win	44–0–9 (4)	(United States) Bill Gabig	PTS	4	Nov 5, 1887	(United States) Grand Central Theater, Wilmington	
56	Win	43–0–9 (4)	(United States) Denny Kelliher	PTS	4	Nov 3, 1887	(United States) Grand Central Theater, Wilmington	
55	Win	42–0–9 (4)	(United States) Frank Bosworth	PTS	4	Nov 1, 1887	(United States) Grand Central Theater, Wilmington	
54	Win	41–0–9 (4)	(United States) Ned McCann	PTS	4	Oct 31, 1887	(United States) Grand Central Theater, Wilmington	
53	Win	40–0–9 (4)	(United States) Billy Dacey	PTS	4	Oct 15, 1887	(United States) Hoboken Casino, Hoboken	
52	Win	39–0–9 (4)	(United States) Jim McHugh	PTS	4	Oct 13, 1887	(United States) Hoboken Casino, Hoboken	
51	Win	38–0–9 (4)	(United States) Eddie Reede	PTS	6	Oct 10, 1887	(United States) Hoboken Casino, Hoboken	
50	Draw	37–0–9 (4)	(United States) Reddy Gallagher	PTS	6	May 2, 1887	(United States) Frankfort St. Gym, Cleveland	
49	NC	37–0–8 (4)	(United States) Billy Baker	ND	4	Apr 9, 1887	(United States) Adelphia Theatre, Buffalo	
48	Win	37–0–8 (3)	(United States) Denny Killen	PTS	4	Feb 5, 1887	(United States) Theatre Comique, Philadelphia	
47	Win	36–0–8 (3)	(United States) Jack Langdon	PTS	4	Feb 2, 1887	(United States) Theatre Comique, Philadelphia	
46	Win	35–0–8 (3)	(Canada) Mike Boded	PTS	10	Jan 31, 1887	(United States) Theatre Comique, Philadelphia	
45	Draw	34–0–8 (3)	(Southern Ireland (1921–1922)) Jack Burke	PTS	10	Nov 22, 1886	(United States) Mechanic's Pavilion, San Francisco	
44	Win	34–0–7 (3)	(United States) Ed Moehler	PTS	4	May 25, 1886	(United States) Leland Rink, Minneapolis	
43	Win	33–0–7 (3)	(United States) Paddy Norton	TKO	4 (5)	May 20, 1886	(United States) Exposition Rink, Saint Paul	
42	Win	32–0–7 (3)	(United States) Jimmy Ryan	PTS	4	Apr 30, 1886	(United States) Philadelphia	
41	Win	31–0–7 (3)	(United States) Charle McCarthy	PTS	4	Apr 28, 1886	(United States) Theatre Comique, Philadelphia	
40	Win	30–0–7 (3)	(United States) Ned McCann	KO	4 (4)	Apr 26, 1886	(United States) Comique Theatre, Philadelphia	
39	Win	29–0–7 (3)	(Canada) George LaBlanche	TKO	13 (?)	Mar 14, 1886	(United States) Larchmont	Won inaugural world middleweight title
38	Win	28–0–7 (3)	(United States) Pete McCoy	PTS	6	Feb 24, 1886	(United States) Oakland Avenue Rink, Jersey City	
37	Win	27–0–7 (3)	(United States) Jack Fogarty	TKO	27 (?)	Feb 2, 1886	(United States) Clarendon Hall, New York	
36	Win	26–0–7 (3)	(United States) Jim Murray	PTS	4	Jan 15, 1886	(United States) Germania Assembly Rooms, New York	
35	Win	25–0–7 (3)	(United Kingdom) Tom Henry	PTS	4	Jan 15, 1886	(United States) Germania Assembly Rooms, New York	
34	NC	24–0–7 (3)	(United States) Mike Donovan	NC	4	Jan 15, 1886	(United States) Germania Assembly Rooms, New York	Potentially an exhibition bout
33	Win	24–0–7 (2)	(United States) Tom Berry	TKO	6 (10)	Dec 14, 1885	(United States) Portland	
32	Win	23–0–7 (2)	(United States) Dave Campbell	KO	3 (8)	Nov 2, 1885	(United States) Portland	
31	Win	22–0–7 (2)	(United States) Tom Norton	TKO	4 (6)	Sep 12, 1885	(United States) Armory Hall, Sacramento	
30	Win	21–0–7 (2)	(United States) Young Billy Manning	TKO	8 (?)	Aug 29, 1885	(United States) Turnverein Hall, Los Angeles	
29	Win	20–0–7 (2)	(Republic of Ireland) Jack Keenan	KO	2 (?)	Jul 20, 1885	(United States) San Francisco	
28	Win	19–0–7 (2)	(United States) Jim Carr	KO	9 (?)	Jun 5, 1885	(United States) Wigwam Theatre, San Francisco	
27	Win	18–0–7 (2)	(United States) Tommy Cleary	KO	5 (?)	May 11, 1885	(United States) Mechanic's Pavilion, San Francisco	
26	Win	17–0–7 (2)	(United States) Tom Barry	KO	5 (?)	May 4, 1885	(United States) Mechanic's Pavilion, San Francisco	
25	Win	16–0–7 (2)	(United States) Charles Bixamos	KO	5 (?)	Mar 19, 1885	(United States) Sportsmen's Park, New Orleans	
24	Win	15–0–7 (2)	(United Kingdom) Jim Fell	PTS	4	Jan 22, 1885	(United States) Athletic Hall, New York	
23	Draw	14–0–7 (2)	(United States) Bill Frazier	PTS	4	Jan 12, 1885	(United States) New York	
22	Win	14–0–6 (2)	(United States) Jimmy Ryan	TKO	4 (4)	Jan 12, 1885	(United States) New York	
21	Win	13–0–6 (2)	(United States) George Wilson	NWS	4	Dec 15, 1884	(United States) Clarks Club, Philadelphia	
20	Win	13–0–6 (1)	(United States) Mike Malone	TKO	2 (?)	Nov 30, 1884	(United States) Philadelphia	
19	Win	12–0–6 (1)	(United States) Bill Frazier	TKO	5 (?)	Nov 20, 1884	(United States) New York	
18	Win	11–0–6 (1)	(United States) Tom Ferguson	PTS	4	Nov 6, 1884	(United States) Harry Hill's, New York	
17	Win	10–0–6 (1)	(United Kingdom) Tom Henry	PTS	6	Oct 24, 1884	(United States) Eighth-Street Theatre, New York	
16	Win	9–0–6 (1)	(United States) Bob Turnbull	PTS	8	Oct 8, 1884	(United States) Billy Madden's Athletic Hall, New York	
15	Draw	8–0–6 (1)	(United States) Jimmy Ryan	PTS	7	Sep 15, 1884	(United States) Clark's Theatre, Philadelphia	
14	Win	8–0–5 (1)	(United States) Mike Dempsey	KO	7 (?)	Sep 4, 1884	(United States) Rockaway	
13	Win	7–0–5 (1)	(United States) George Fulljames	TKO	21 (?)	July 30, 1884	(United States) Staten Island, New York	Claimed world middleweight title
12	Draw	6–0–5 (1)	(United Kingdom) Tom Henry	PTS	4	Jul 8, 1884	(United States) Rockaway Beach, Queens	
11	Draw	6–0–4 (1)	(United States) Jack Hayes	PTS	6	Apr 25, 1884	(United States) New York	
10	Win	6–0–3 (1)	(United States) Bill Dacey	TKO	9 (?)	Mar 6, 1884	(United States) Campbell's Hotel, Coney Island	Won vacant Lightweight Championship of New York; Queensberry Rules & hard gloves
9	Win	5–0–3 (1)	(United States) Tommy Sullivan	PTS	2	Mar 4, 1884	(United States) New York	
8	Win	4–0–3 (1)	(United States) Joe Hennesey	PTS	4	Mar 2, 1884	(United States) New York	
7	Win	3–0–3 (1)	(United States) Jim Barry	TKO	3 (4)	Feb 28, 1884	(United States) Billy Madden's Athletic Hall, New York	
6	Win	2–0–3 (1)	(United Kingdom) Jim Fell	PTS	2	Feb 14, 1884	(United States) New York	
5	Draw	1–0–3 (1)	(United States) Joe Heiser	PTS	8	Feb 10, 1884	(United States) Williamsburg, Brooklyn	
4	Win	1–0–2 (1)	(United States) William Mahoney	KO	3 (?)	Jan 15, 1884	(United States) New York	
3	Draw	0–0–2 (1)	(United States) Bob Turnbull	PTS	7 (4)	Oct 25, 1883	(United States) Clarendon Hall, New York	
2	Draw	0–0–1 (1)	(United States) Tom McAlpine	PTS	4	Sep 17, 1883	(United States) Harry Hill's, New York	
1	NC	0–0 (1)	(United States) Harry Force	NC	11 (?)	Sep 3, 1883	(United States) Coney Island, Brooklyn	Police intervened at Blissville (now part of Long Island City) and fight moved to Coney Island. It was never completed

Achievements
Inaugural Champion	World Middleweight Champion; July 30, 1884 – January 14, 1891	Succeeded by Bob Fitzsimmons
