= Edward Rollins (boxer) =

Australian boxer (1852–1939)

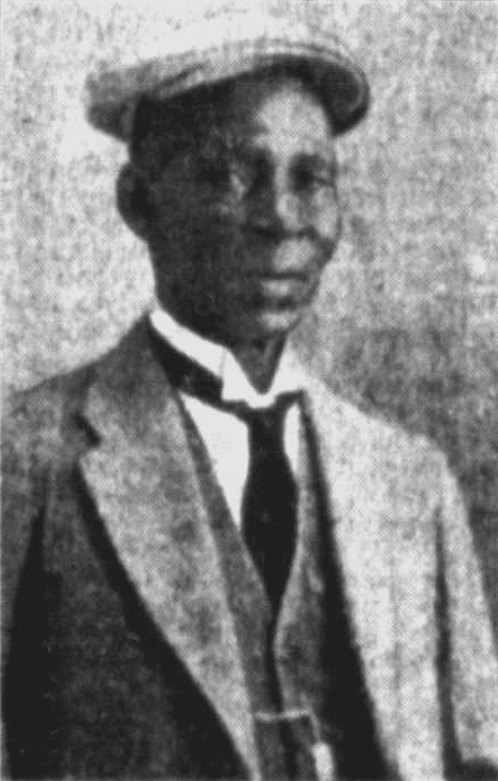

Personal information
- Nickname: Starlight
- Nationality: Australian
- Born: Edward William Rollins; 1 January 1852 Georgetown, British Guiana
- Died: 1 February 1939 (aged 87) Sydney, Australia
- Weight: 150–165 lb (72–77 kg)

Boxing career

Boxing record
- Total fights: 79
- Wins: 27
- Win by KO: 17
- Losses: 36
- Draws: 11

Edward William Rollins (1 January 1852 – 1 February 1939), commonly known as Starlight, was an Australian middleweight boxer.

== Boxing career ==
Rollins was a top middleweight contender for the Australian Middleweight Championship during his career and fought for the title four times

During his career, Starlight defeated such men as Jack Malloy, "Black Chris" Smithers, Jim Barron, James "Tut" Ryan, Bill Heffernan, Jack Perryman, Charlie Woods and Ike Stewart.

== Family ==
Rollins married Kate Pratt, the daughter of black American parents. They had a daughter, Marjorie Duguid, who was the grandmother of Australian pop singer Colleen Hewett.

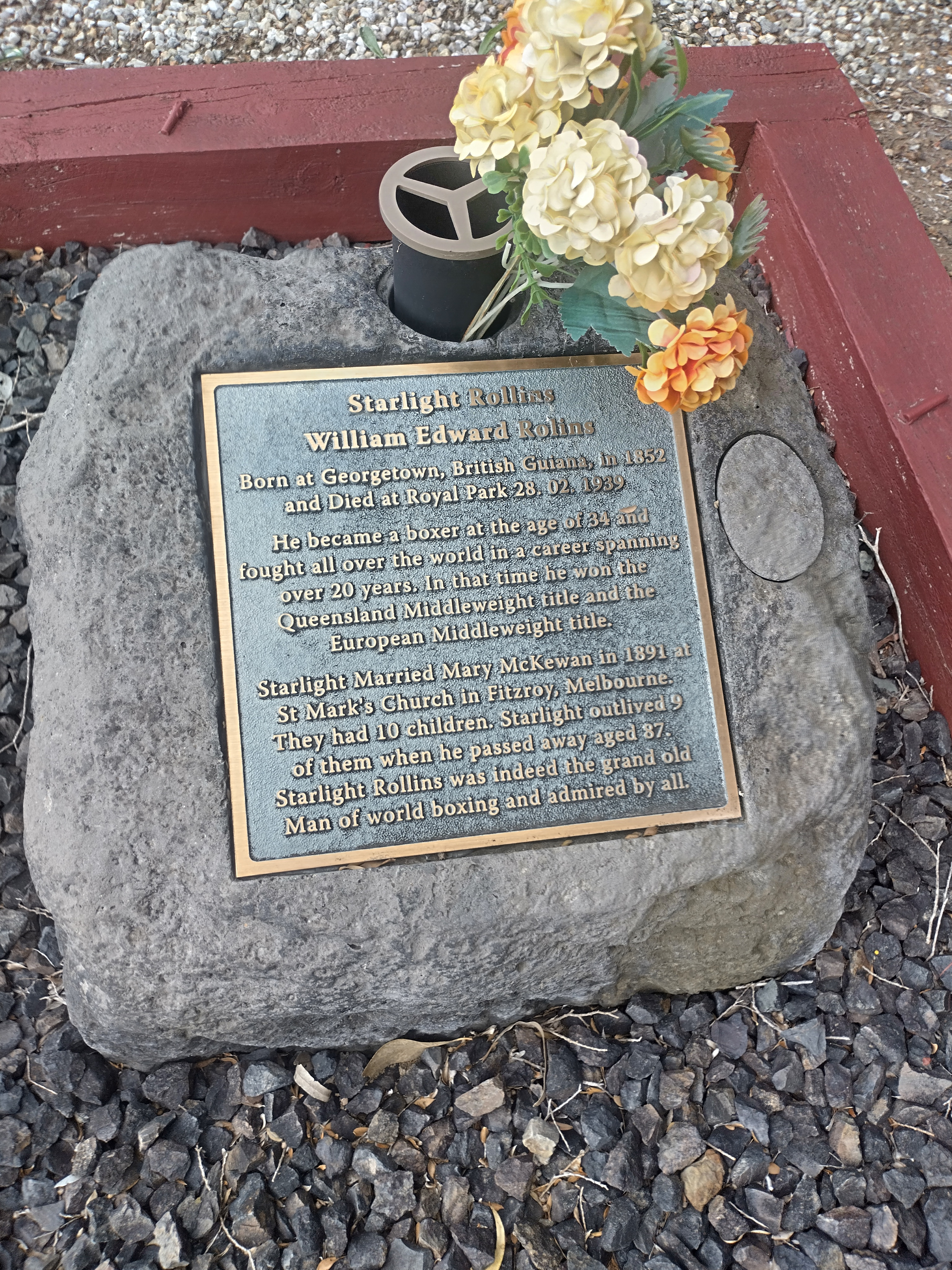

Edward Rollins was buried at Fawkner Memorial Park on the 12 September 1911.
