= World heavyweight boxing championship records and statistics =

Below is a list of world heavyweight boxing championship records and statistics.

== Championship recognition ==
As per International Boxing Hall Of Fame:

=== 1885–1921 ===
World champions were initially recognized by wide public acclamation, with heavyweight champions winning and losing championship recognition solely in the ring. Retirements periodically resulted in no one, true champion being recognized, while in other cases new champions were proclaimed only to see a previously recognized champion come out of retirement. Public interest in boxing resulted in a true champion being determined by means of title claimants facing one another in the ring, with the winner being recognized as world champion.

Currently, International Boxing Hall Of Fame recognizes these world heavyweight title lineages from this period: (Note: See)

	Date started	First champion	Date ended	Last champion
1	August 29, 1885	John L. Sullivan	May 15, 1905	James J. Jeffries
2	July 3, 1905	Marvin Hart	September 23, 1926	Jack Dempsey

=== Sanctioning organizations: 1921–present ===
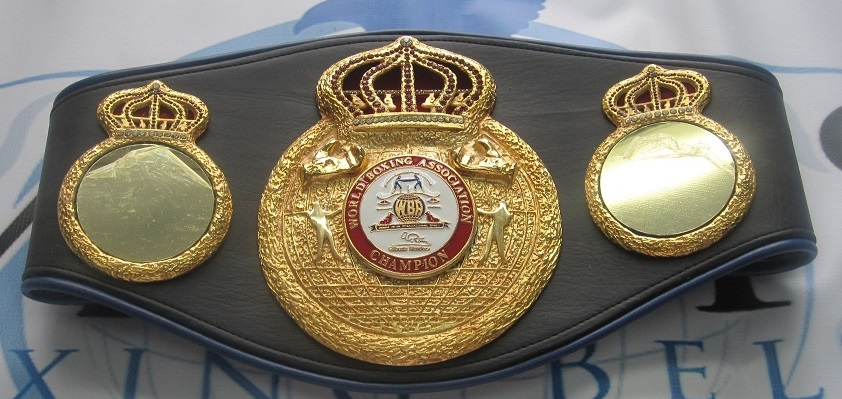
WBA world championship

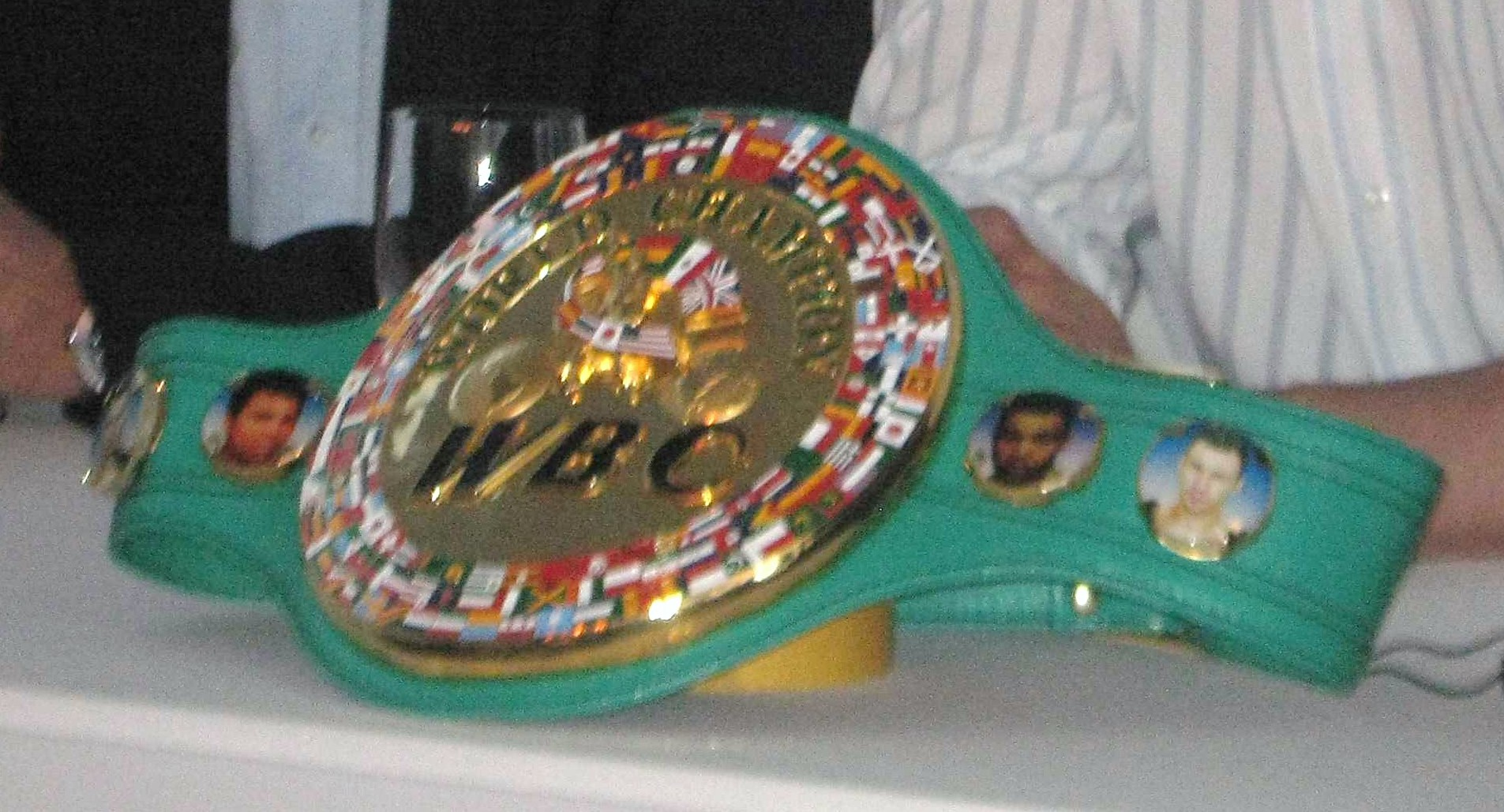
WBC world championship

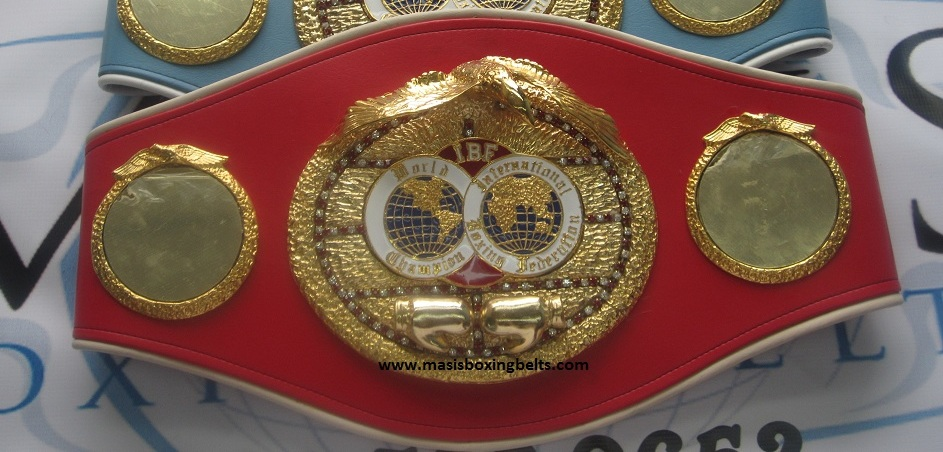
IBF world championship

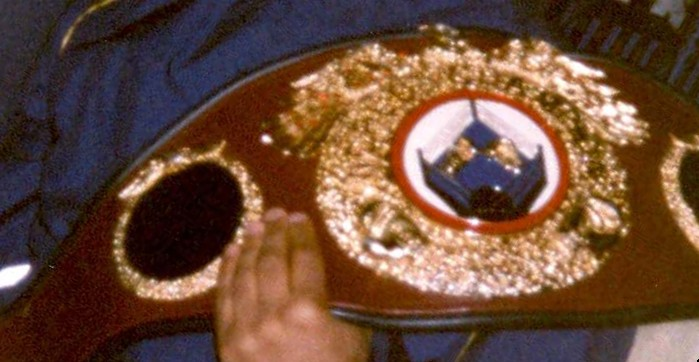
WBO world championship

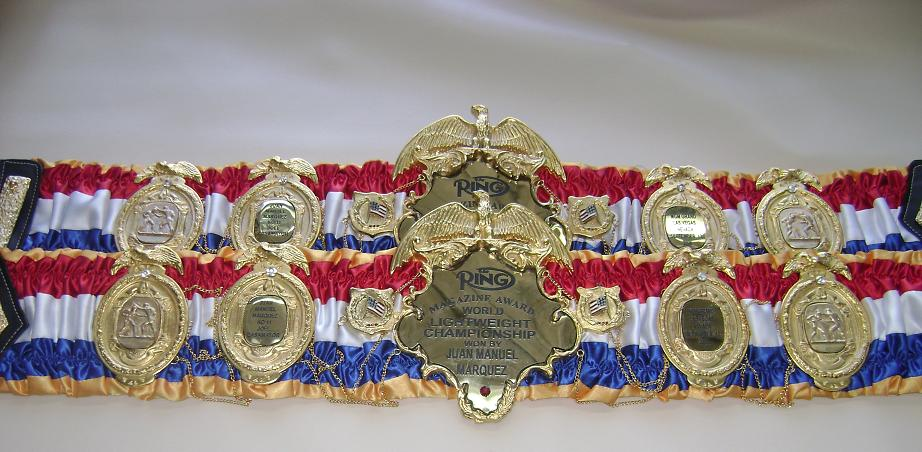
The Ring world championship

Gradually, the role of recognizing champions in the division evolved into a more formal affair, with public acclamation being supplemented (or in some cases, contradicted) by recognition by one or more athletic commissions, sanctioning organizations, or a combination of them. The International Boxing Hall of Fame (IBHOF) recognizes these organizations as major in boxing:

- The New York State Athletic Commission (NYSAC). A governmental entity initially formed for the purpose of regulating boxing in the State of New York, thanks to New York's place as the epicenter of boxing from the 1930s through 1950s, the NYSAC expanded its reach to sanctioning championship bouts. This practice continued until, like the IBU, the NYSAC became a member of the WBC.
- The National Boxing Association (NBA) was organized in 1921. In 1962, the organization was renamed the World Boxing Association (WBA).
- The WBC was organized in 1963.
- The IBF, which was founded in 1983 by the members of the United States Boxing Association after the USBA withdrew from membership in the WBA.
- The WBO, founded in 1988. The IBHOF started recognizing WBO as a major organization no later than August 23, 1997. (Note: Several IBHOF inductees’ professional boxing records printed in the organization's official record books indicate that IBHOF did not recognize WBO as a major organization until at least August 23, 1997: IBHOF official record book, 1997 edition; Sugar Ray Leonard's opponent Thomas Hearns, who was defending the WBO super middleweight title against him on 12 June 1989, is not marked as World Champion; IBHOF official record book, 1999 edition; Sugar Ray Leonard's opponent Thomas Hearns, who was defending the WBO super middleweight title against him on 12 June 1989, is not marked as World Champion; IBHOF official record book, 2002 edition; Sugar Ray Leonard's opponent Thomas Hearns, who was defending the WBO super middleweight title against him on 12 June 1989, is not marked as World Champion; IBHOF official record book, 2006 edition; Sugar Ray Leonard's opponent Thomas Hearns, who was defending the WBO super middleweight title against him on 12 June 1989, is not marked as World Champion; Michael Carbajal's opponent Josue Camacho, who was defending the WBO junior flyweight title against him on 15 July 1994, is not marked as World Champion; Michael Carbajal’s opponent Jorge Arce, who was defending the WBO junior flyweight title against him on 31 July 1999, is marked as World Champion; IBHOF official record book, 2011 edition; Sugar Ray Leonard's opponent Thomas Hearns, who was defending the WBO super middleweight title against him on 12 June 1989, is not marked as World Champion; Michael Carbajal's opponent Josue Camacho, who was defending the WBO junior flyweight title against him on 15 July 1994, is not marked as World Champion; Ricardo Lopez's opponent Alex Sanchez, who was defending the WBO minimumweight title against him on 23 August 1997, is marked as World Champion; Michael Carbajal’s opponent Jorge Arce, who was defending the WBO junior flyweight title against him on 31 July 1999, is marked as World Champion)

There are also titles that are not considered major, but play a significant role in legitimizing the heavyweight champion:

- The Ring began awarding championship belts in 1922, stopped giving belts to world champions in the 1990s, then reintroduced their title in 2002, and ignored the current ongoing world championship lineage. Under the original version of the policy, you could win the title by either defeating the reigning champion or winning a box-off between the magazine's No. 1 and No. 2 (occasionally No. 3) ranked contenders. A fighter could not be stripped of the title unless he lost or retired. Since May 2012, under the new policy, The Ring title can be awarded when the No. 1 and No. 2 contenders face each other or when either of them faces No. 3, No. 4 or No. 5 contender. In addition, the title can be taken away by losing the fight, not scheduling a fight for 18 months, not scheduling a fight with a top 5 contender for two years, or retiring.

== Most opponents beaten in title fights ==
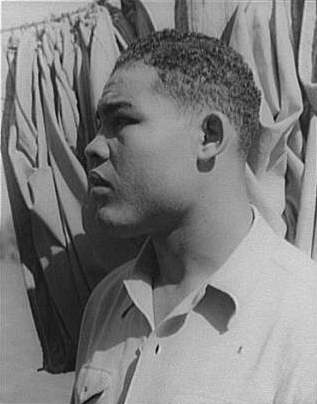
Joe Louis

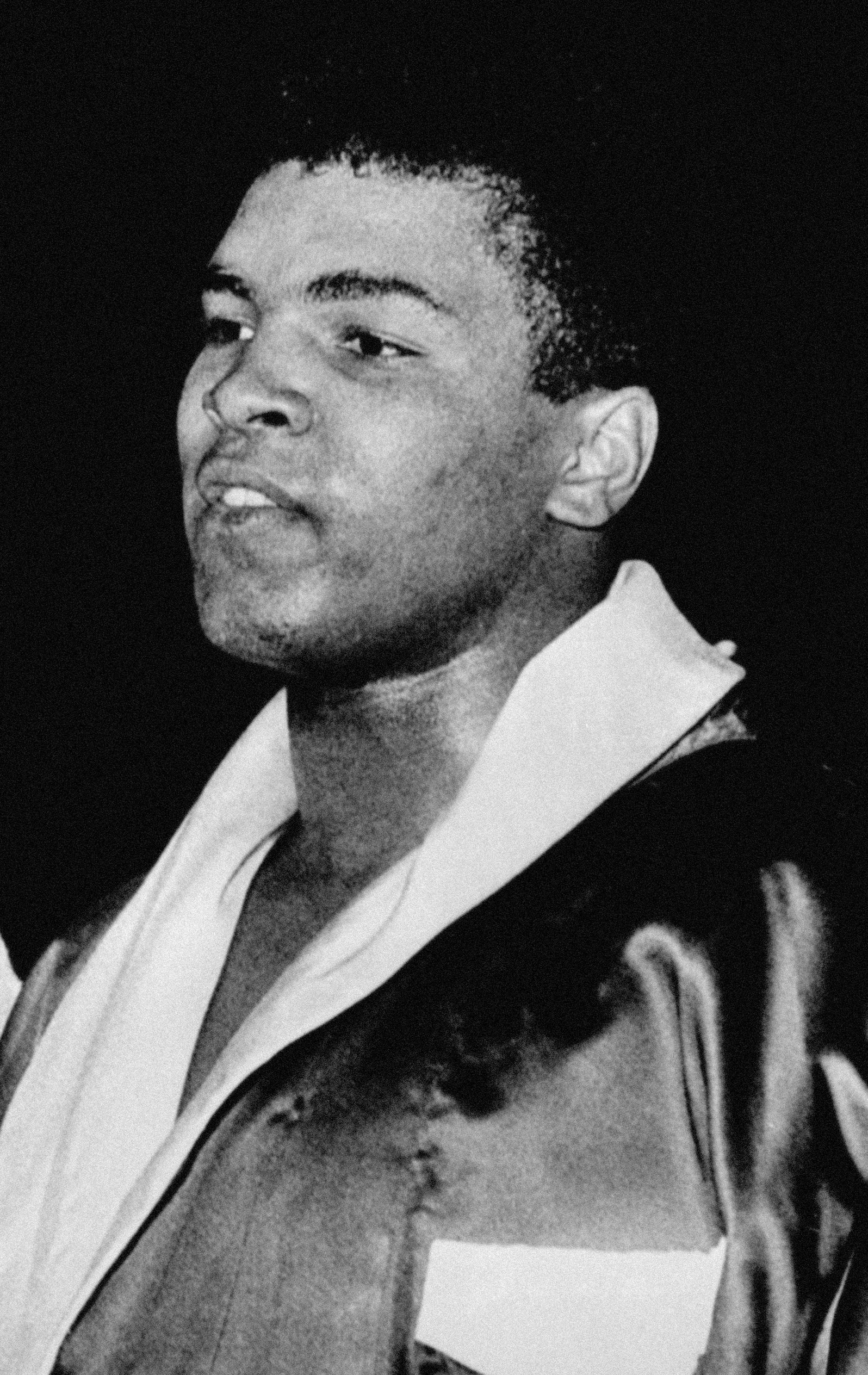
Muhammad Ali

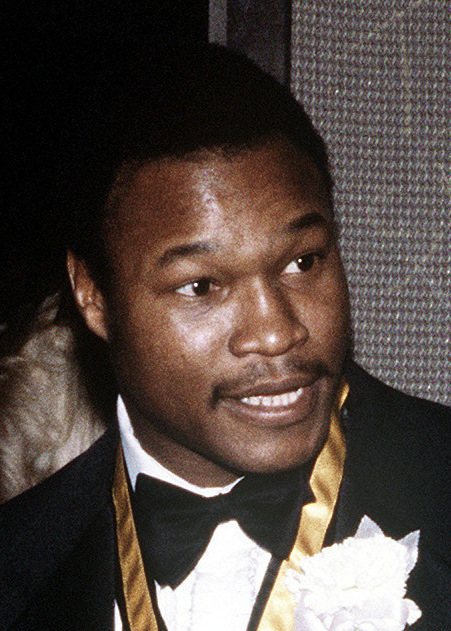
Larry Holmes

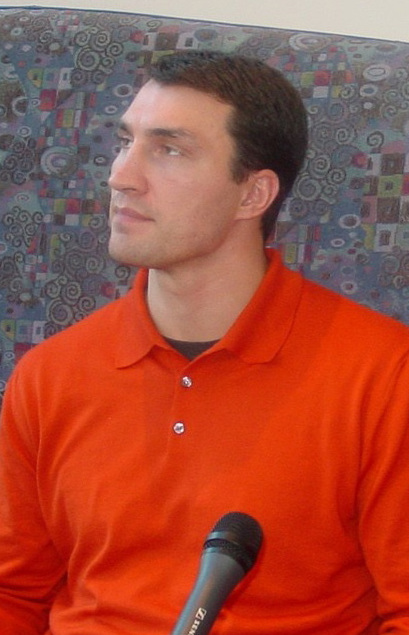
Wladimir Klitschko

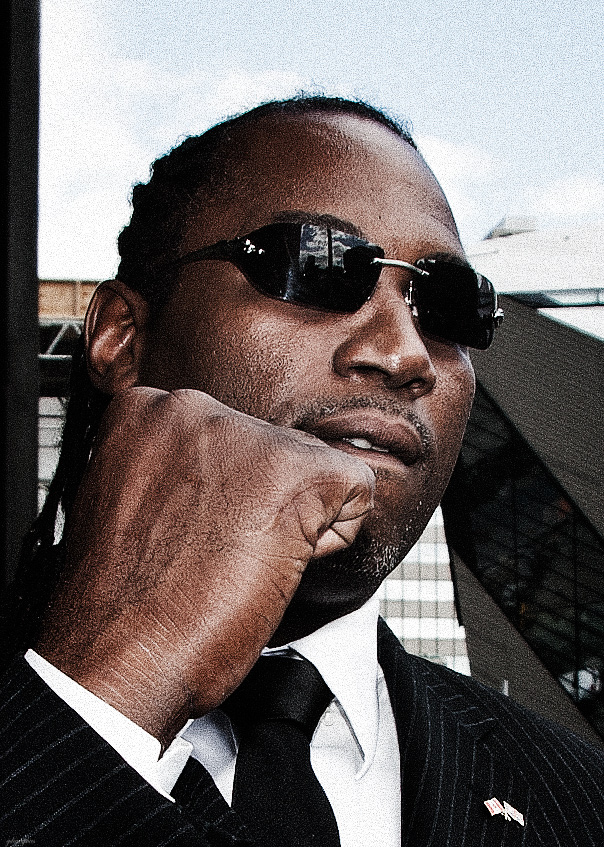
Lennox Lewis

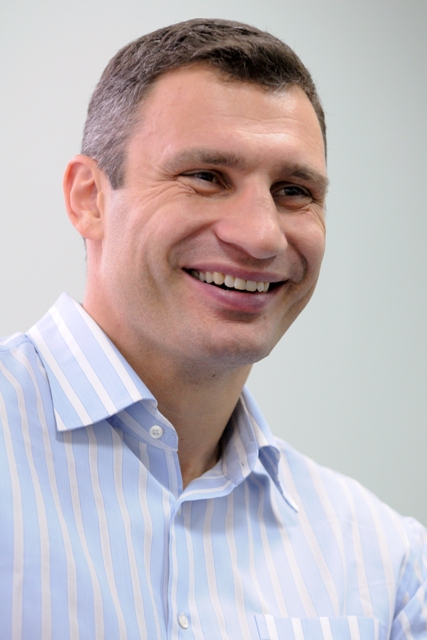
Vitali Klitschko

Keys:

Active title reign
Reign has ended

- Note: Secondary championships are not included.

=== All championship reigns ===
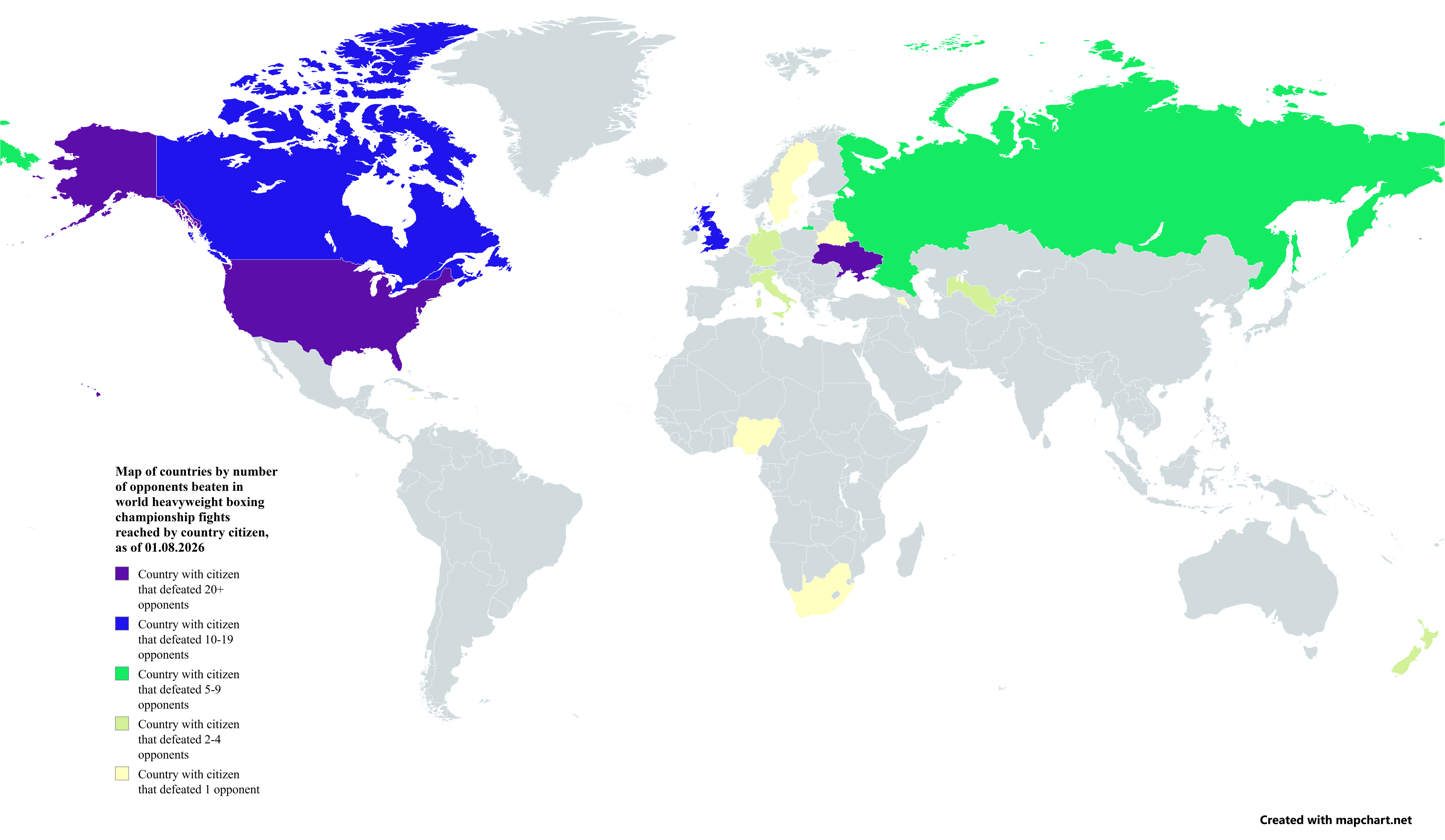
Map of countries, number of beaten opponents in world heavyweight boxing championship fights reached by country citizen (as of 1 August 2026). Note: secondary championships are not included

The list does not include The Ring and lineal championship fights after July 2, 1921.

Pos.	Name	Reign began-ended	Recognition	Beaten opponents	Fights
1.	Wladimir Klitschko	1. October 14, 2000 — March 8, 2003; 2. April 22, 2006 — November 28, 2015	1. WBO; 2. WBA, IBF, WBO	23	
2.	Joe Louis	June 22, 1937 — March 1, 1949	NYSAC, NBA	22	
3.	Muhammad Ali	1. February 25, 1964 – March 11, 1969; 2. October 30, 1974 — February 15, 1978; 3. September 15, 1978 — July 3, 1979	1. WBA, WBC; 2. WBA, WBC; 3. WBA	21	
4.	Larry Holmes	June 9, 1978 — September 21, 1985	WBC, IBF	20	
5.	Lennox Lewis	1. December 14, 1992 — September 24, 1994; 2. February 7, 1997 — April 22, 2001; 3. November 17, 2001 — February 6, 2004	1. WBC; 2. WBA, WBC, IBF; 3. WBC, IBF	15	
5.	Vitali Klitschko	1. June 26, 1999 — April 1, 2000; 2. April 24, 2004 — November 9, 2005; 3. October 11, 2008 — December 15, 2013	1. WBO; 2. WBC; 3. WBC	15	
7.	Mike Tyson	1. November 22, 1986 — February 11, 1990; 2. March 16, 1996 — November 9, 1996	1. WBA, WBC, IBF; 2. WBA, WBC	11	
7.	Tommy Burns	February 23, 1906 — December 26, 1908	lineal	11	
9.	Joe Frazier	March 4, 1968 — January 22, 1973	NYSAC, WBA, WBC	10	
10.	Evander Holyfield	1. October 25, 1990 — November 13, 1992; 2. November 6, 1993 — April 22, 1994; 3. November 9, 1996 — November 13, 1999; 4. August 12, 2000 — March 3, 2001	1. WBA, WBC, IBF; 2. WBA, IBF; 3. WBA, IBF; 4. WBA	9	
10.	Anthony Joshua	1. April 9, 2016 — June 1, 2019; 2. December 7, 2019 — September 25, 2021	WBA, IBF, WBO	9	
12.	Ezzard Charles	September 27, 1950 — July 18, 1951	NBA, NYSAC	8	
12.	Deontay Wilder	January 17, 2015 — February 22, 2020	WBC	8	
14.	Floyd Patterson	1. November 30, 1956 — June 26, 1959; 2. June 20, 1960 — September 25, 1962	NYSAC, NBA	7	
15.	Jack Johnson	December 26, 1908 — April 5, 1915	lineal	6	
15.	Jack Dempsey	July 4, 1919 — September 23, 1926	lineal-to-NBA and NYSAC	6	
15.	James J. Jeffries	June 9, 1899 — May 13, 1905	lineal	6	

=== All championship reigns of undisputed champions/lineal champions/The Ring champions ===
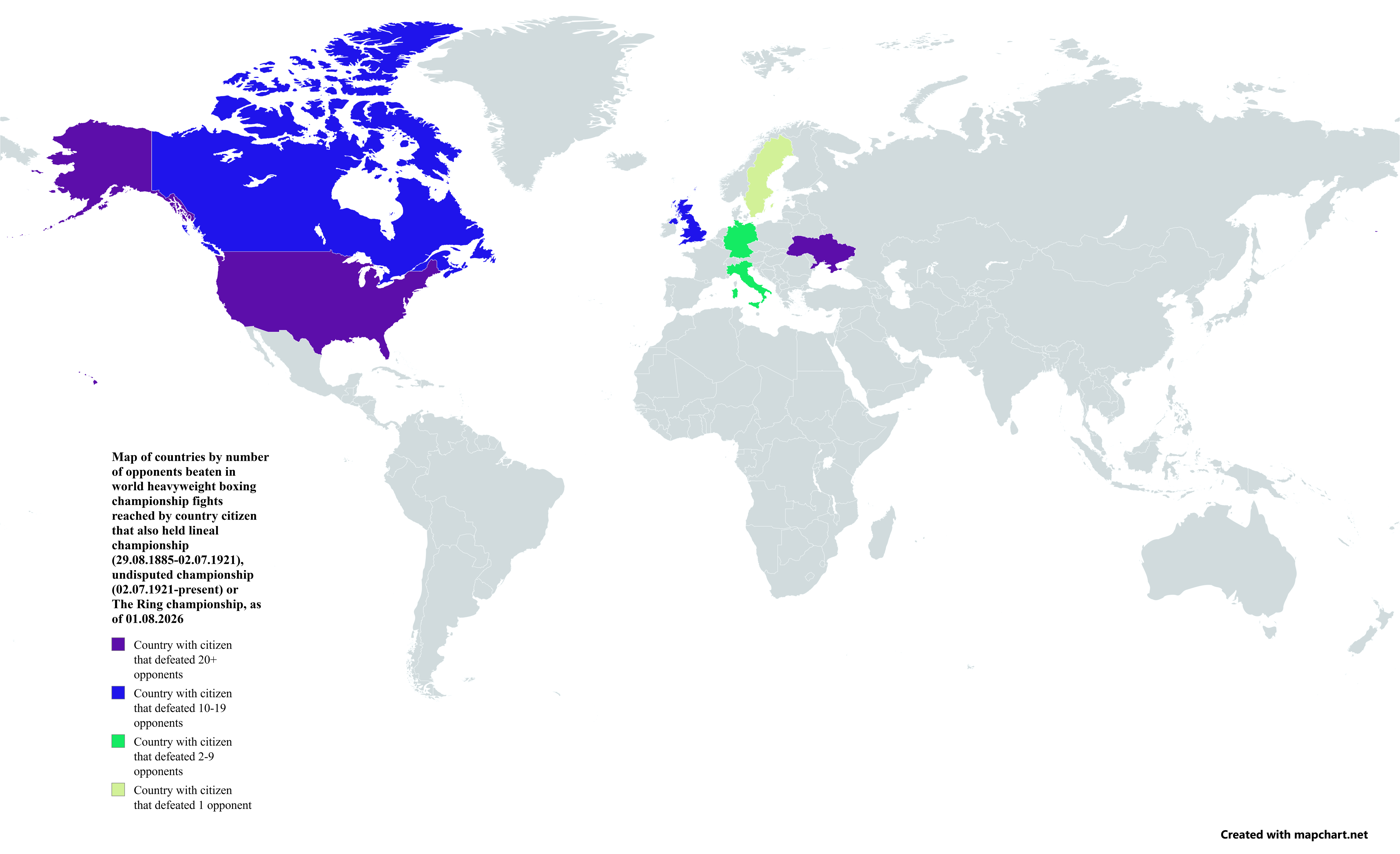
Map of countries, number of beaten opponents in world heavyweight boxing championship fights reached by country citizen - undisputed champion (July 2, 1921-present), lineal champion (August 29, 1885–July 2, 1921), The Ring champion; as of 1 August 2026. Note: secondary championships are not included

The list does not include The Ring and lineal championship fights after July 2, 1921, although it only includes heavyweight champions that captured undisputed championship (July 2, 1921–present), lineal championship (August 29, 1885 – July 2, 1921) or The Ring championship.

Pos.	Name	Reign began-ended	Recognition	Beaten opponents	Fights
1.	Wladimir Klitschko	1. October 14, 2000 — March 8, 2003; 2. April 22, 2006 — November 28, 2015	1. WBO; 2. WBA, IBF, WBO	23	
2.	Joe Louis	June 22, 1937 — March 1, 1949	NYSAC, NBA	22	
3.	Muhammad Ali	1. February 25, 1964 – March 11, 1969; 2. October 30, 1974 — February 15, 1978; 3. September 15, 1978 — July 3, 1979	1. WBA, WBC; 2. WBA, WBC; 3. WBA	21	
4.	Larry Holmes	June 9, 1978 — September 21, 1985	WBC, IBF	20	
5.	Lennox Lewis	1. December 14, 1992 — September 24, 1994; 2. February 7, 1997 — April 22, 2001; 3. November 17, 2001 — February 6, 2004	1. WBC; 2. WBA, WBC, IBF; 3. WBC, IBF	15	
5.	Vitali Klitschko	1. June 26, 1999 — April 1, 2000; 2. April 24, 2004 — November 9, 2005; 3. October 11, 2008 — December 15, 2013	1. WBO; 2. WBC; 3. WBC	15	
7.	Mike Tyson	1. November 22, 1986 — February 11, 1990; 2. March 16, 1996 — November 9, 1996	1. WBA, WBC, IBF; 2. WBA, WBC	11	
7.	Tommy Burns	February 23, 1906 — December 26, 1908	lineal	11	
9.	Joe Frazier	March 4, 1968 — January 22, 1973	NYSAC, WBA, WBC	10	
10.	Evander Holyfield	1. October 25, 1990 — November 13, 1992; 2. November 6, 1993 — April 22, 1994; 3. November 9, 1996 — November 13, 1999; 4. August 12, 2000 — March 3, 2001	1. WBA, WBC, IBF; 2. WBA, IBF; 3. WBA, IBF; 4. WBA	9	
11.	Ezzard Charles	September 27, 1950 — July 18, 1951	NBA, NYSAC	8	
12.	Floyd Patterson	1. November 30, 1956 — June 26, 1959; 2. June 20, 1960 — September 25, 1962	NYSAC, NBA	7	
12.	Jack Johnson	December 26, 1908 — April 5, 1915	lineal	7	
14.	James J. Jeffries	June 9, 1899 — May 13, 1905	lineal	6	
14.	Jack Dempsey	July 4, 1919 — September 23, 1926	lineal-to-NBA and NYSAC	6	

=== Championship reigns of undisputed/lineal/The Ring champions with undisputed/lineal/The Ring/unified championships, victories over champions ===
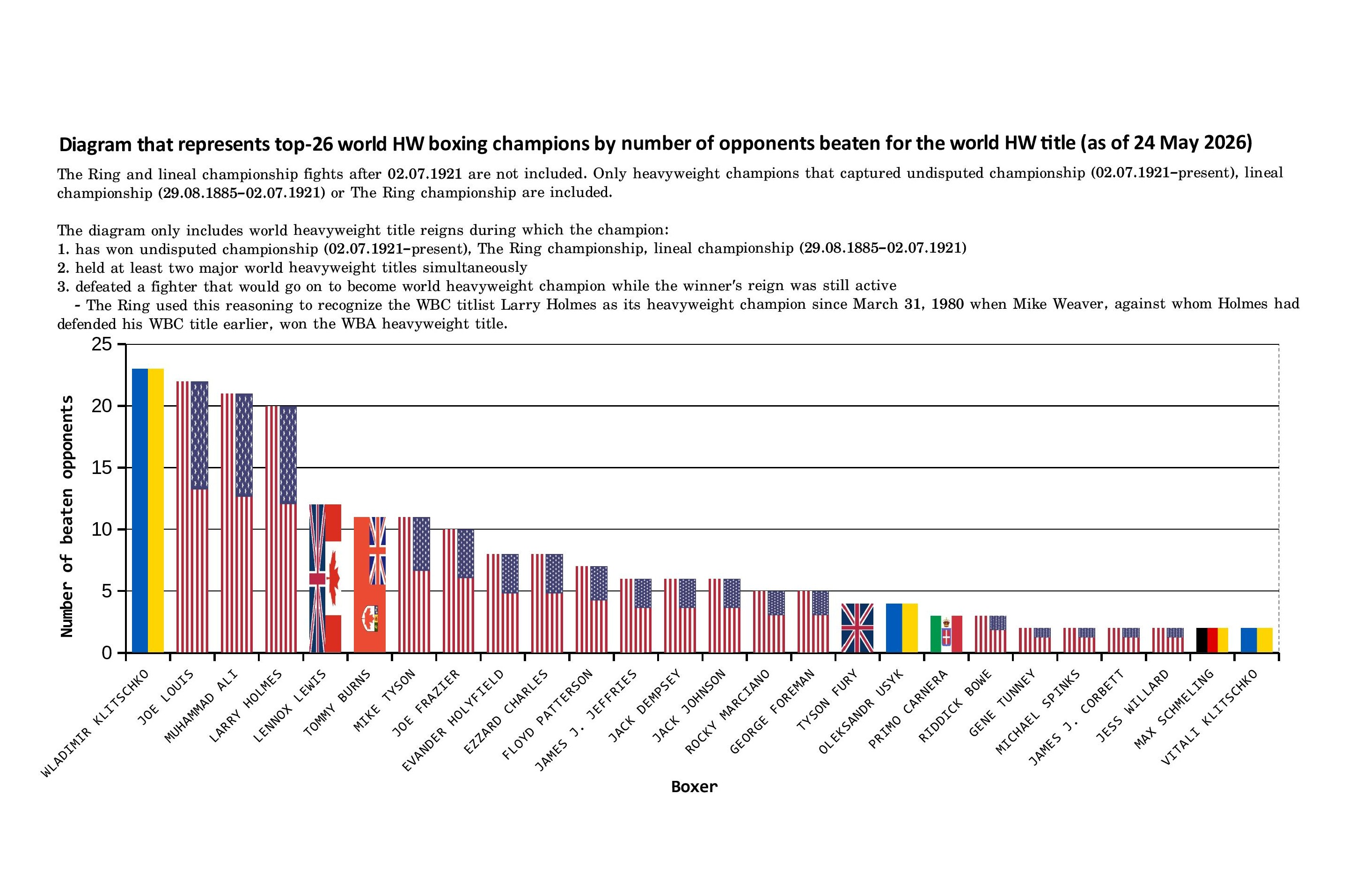
Diagram that represents top 26 world heavyweight champions by number of opponents beaten for the world heavyweight title (as of 24 May 2026)

The list does not include The Ring and lineal championship fights after July 2, 1921, although it only includes heavyweight champions that captured undisputed championship (July 2, 1921–present), lineal championship (August 29, 1885 – July 2, 1921) or The Ring championship.

The list only includes title reigns during which the champion:

- has won undisputed championship (July 2, 1921–present), The Ring championship, lineal championship (August 29, 1885 – July 2, 1921)
- held at least two major world heavyweight titles simultaneously
- defeated a fighter that would become world heavyweight champion while the winner's reign was still active (Note: The Ring used this reasoning to recognize the WBC titlist Larry Holmes as its heavyweight champion since March 31, 1980 when Mike Weaver, against whom Holmes had defended his WBC title earlier, won the WBA heavyweight title.)

As of September 8, 2026.

Pos.	Name	Reign began-ended	Recognition	Additional recognition	Beaten champions (recognition)	Beaten opponents	Fights
1.	Wladimir Klitschko	1. October 14, 2000 — March 8, 2003; 2. April 22, 2006 — November 28, 2015	1. WBO; 2. unified	2. The Ring	1. Chris Byrd (IBF)	23	
2.	Joe Louis	June 22, 1937 — March 1, 1949	undisputed	The Ring		22	
3.	Muhammad Ali	1. February 25, 1964 – March 11, 1969; 2. October 30, 1974 — February 15, 1978; 3. September 15, 1978 — July 3, 1979	1. undisputed 2. undisputed 3. WBA	The Ring		21	
4.	Larry Holmes	June 9, 1978 — September 21, 1985	WBC-to-IBF	The Ring	Mike Weaver (WBA), Tim Witherspoon (WBC)	20	
5.	Lennox Lewis	1. February 7, 1997 — April 22, 2001; 2. November 17, 2001 — February 6, 2004	1. undisputed 2. unified	2. The Ring	1. Evander Holyfield (WBA)	12	
6.	Mike Tyson	1. November 22, 1986 — February 11, 1990; 2. March 16, 1996 — November 9, 1996	1. undisputed 2. unified	1. The Ring		11	
6.	Tommy Burns	February 23, 1906 — December 26, 1908	lineal	lineal		11	
8.	Joe Frazier	March 4, 1968 — January 22, 1973	undisputed	The Ring		10	
9.	Evander Holyfield	1. October 25, 1990 — November 13, 1992; 2. November 6, 1993 — April 22, 1994; 3. November 9, 1996 — November 13, 1999	1. undisputed 2. unified 3. unified			8	
9.	Ezzard Charles	September 27, 1950 — July 18, 1951	undisputed	The Ring		8	
11.	Floyd Patterson	1. November 30, 1956 — June 26, 1959; 2. June 20, 1960 — September 25, 1962	undisputed	The Ring		7	
12.	Jack Johnson	December 26, 1908 — April 5, 1915	lineal	lineal		6	
12.	James J. Jeffries	June 9, 1899 — May 13, 1905	lineal	lineal		6	
12.	Jack Dempsey	July 4, 1919 — September 23, 1926	undisputed	The Ring		6	
15.	Rocky Marciano	September 23, 1952 — April 27, 1956	undisputed	The Ring		5	
15.	George Foreman	1. January 22, 1973 — October 30, 1974; 2. November 4, 1994 — June 29, 1995	1. undisputed 2. unified	1. The Ring		5	
17.	Tyson Fury	1. November 28, 2015 — October 12, 2016; 2. February 22, 2020 — May 18, 2024	1. unified 2. WBC	1. The Ring; 2. The Ring		4	
17.	Oleksandr Usyk	September 25, 2021 – June 26, 2026	undisputed	The Ring	Daniel Dubois (IBF)	4	
19.	Primo Carnera	June 29, 1933 – June 14, 1934	undisputed	The Ring		3	
19.	Riddick Bowe	November 13, 1992 — November 6, 1993	undisputed			3	
21.	James J. Corbett	September 7, 1892 – March 17, 1897	lineal	lineal		2	
21.	Jess Willard	April 5, 1915 — July 4, 1919	lineal	lineal		2	
21.	Max Schmeling	June 12, 1930 – January 7, 1931	undisputed	The Ring		2	
21.	Vitali Klitschko	April 24, 2004 — November 9, 2005	WBC	The Ring		2	
21.	Gene Tunney	September 23, 1926 – July 31, 1928	undisputed	The Ring		2	
21.	Michael Spinks	September 21, 1985 — February 19, 1987	IBF	The Ring		2	
27.	John L. Sullivan	August 29, 1885 — September 7, 1892	lineal	lineal		1	
27.	Bob Fitzsimmons	March 17, 1897 — June 9, 1899	lineal	lineal		1	
27.	Marvin Hart	July 3, 1905 — February 23, 1906	lineal	lineal		1	
27.	Max Baer	June 14, 1934 — June 13, 1935	undisputed	The Ring		1	
27.	James J. Braddock	June 13, 1935 — June 22, 1937	undisputed	The Ring		1	
27.	Jersey Joe Walcott	July 18, 1951 — September 23, 1952	undisputed	The Ring		1	
27.	Ingemar Johansson	June 26, 1959 — June 20, 1960	undisputed	The Ring		1	
27.	Sonny Liston	September 25, 1962 — February 25, 1964	undisputed	The Ring		1	
27.	Leon Spinks	February 15, 1978 — September 15, 1978	undisputed	The Ring		1	
27.	Buster Douglas	February 11, 1990 — October 25, 1990	undisputed			1	

== Most wins in title fights ==
Keys:

Active title reign
Reign has ended

=== All championship reigns ===
The list does not include The Ring and lineal championship fights after July 2, 1921.

- Note: Secondary championships are not included.

Pos.	Name	Reign began-ended	Recognition	Title fight wins	Fights
1.	Joe Louis	June 22, 1937 — March 1, 1949	NYSAC, NBA	27	
2.	Wladimir Klitschko	1. October 14, 2000 — March 8, 2003; 2. April 22, 2006 — November 28, 2015	1. WBO; 2. WBA, IBF, WBO	25	
3.	Muhammad Ali	1. February 25, 1964 – March 11, 1969; 2. October 30, 1974 — February 15, 1978; 3. September 15, 1978 — July 3, 1979	1. WBA, WBC; 2. WBA, WBC; 3. WBA	22	
4.	Larry Holmes	June 9, 1978 — September 21, 1985	WBC, IBF	20	
5.	Lennox Lewis	1. December 14, 1992 — September 24, 1994; 2. February 7, 1997 — April 22, 2001; 3. November 17, 2001 — February 6, 2004	1. WBC; 2. WBA, WBC, IBF; 3. WBC, IBF	15	
5.	Vitali Klitschko	1. June 26, 1999 — April 1, 2000; 2. April 24, 2004 — November 9, 2005; 3. October 11, 2008 — December 15, 2013	1. WBO; 2. WBC; 3. WBC	15	
7.	Tommy Burns	February 23, 1906 — December 26, 1908	lineal	13	
8.	Mike Tyson	1. November 22, 1986 — February 11, 1990; 2. March 16, 1996 — November 9, 1996	1. WBA, WBC, IBF; 2. WBA, WBC	12	
9.	Joe Frazier	March 4, 1968 — January 22, 1973	NYSAC, WBA, WBC	10	
9.	Deontay Wilder	January 17, 2015 — February 22, 2020	WBC	10	
9.	Evander Holyfield	1. October 25, 1990 — November 13, 1992; 2. November 6, 1993 — April 22, 1994; 3. November 9, 1996 — November 13, 1999; 4. August 12, 2000 — March 3, 2001	1. WBA, WBC, IBF; 2. WBA, IBF; 3. WBA, IBF; 4. WBA	10	
12.	Ezzard Charles	September 27, 1950 — July 18, 1951	NBA, NYSAC	9	
12.	Anthony Joshua	1. April 9, 2016 – June 1, 2019; 2. December 7, 2019 – September 25, 2021	WBA, IBF, WBO	9	
14.	Floyd Patterson	1. November 30, 1956 — June 26, 1959; 2. June 20, 1960 — September 25, 1962	NYSAC, NBA	8	
14.	James J. Jeffries	June 9, 1899 — May 13, 1905	lineal	8	

=== All championship reigns of undisputed champions/lineal champions/The Ring champions ===
The list does not include The Ring and lineal championship fights after July 2, 1921, although it only includes heavyweight champions that captured undisputed championship (July 2, 1921–present), lineal championship (August 29, 1885 – July 2, 1921) or The Ring championship.

Pos.	Name	Reign began-ended	Recognition	Title fight wins	Fights
1.	Joe Louis	June 22, 1937 — March 1, 1949	NYSAC, NBA	27	
2.	Wladimir Klitschko	1. October 14, 2000 — March 8, 2003; 2. April 22, 2006 — November 28, 2015	1. WBO; 2. WBA, IBF, WBO	25	
3.	Muhammad Ali	1. February 25, 1964 – March 11, 1969; 2. October 30, 1974 — February 15, 1978; 3. September 15, 1978 — July 3, 1979	1. WBA, WBC; 2. WBA, WBC; 3. WBA	22	
4.	Larry Holmes	June 9, 1978 — September 21, 1985	WBC, IBF	20	
5.	Lennox Lewis	1. December 14, 1992 — September 24, 1994; 2. February 7, 1997 — April 22, 2001; 3. November 17, 2001 — February 6, 2004	1. WBC; 2. WBA, WBC, IBF; 3. WBC, IBF	15	
5.	Vitali Klitschko	1. June 26, 1999 — April 1, 2000; 2. April 24, 2004 — November 9, 2005; 3. October 11, 2008 — December 15, 2013	1. WBO; 2. WBC; 3. WBC	15	
7.	Tommy Burns	February 23, 1906 — December 26, 1908	lineal	13	
8.	Mike Tyson	1. November 22, 1986 — February 11, 1990; 2. March 16, 1996 — November 9, 1996	1. WBA, WBC, IBF; 2. WBC, WBA	12	
9.	Joe Frazier	March 4, 1968 — January 22, 1973	NYSAC, WBA, WBC	10	
9.	Evander Holyfield	1. October 25, 1990 — November 13, 1992; 2. November 6, 1993 — April 22, 1994; 3. November 9, 1996 — November 13, 1999; 4. August 12, 2000 — March 3, 2001	1. WBA, WBC, IBF; 2. WBA, IBF; 3. WBA, IBF; 4. WBA	10	
11.	Ezzard Charles	September 27, 1950 — July 18, 1951	NBA, NYSAC	9	
12.	Floyd Patterson	1. November 30, 1956 — June 26, 1959; 2. June 20, 1960 — September 25, 1962	NYSAC, NBA	8	
12.	James J. Jeffries	June 9, 1899 — May 13, 1905	lineal	8	
14.	Rocky Marciano	September 23, 1952 — April 27, 1956	NYSAC, NBA	7	
14.	Oleksandr Usyk	September 25, 2021 — present	WBA, WBC, IBF, WBO	7	

=== Championship reigns of undisputed/lineal/The Ring champions with undisputed/lineal/The Ring/unified championships, victories over champions ===
The list does not include The Ring and lineal championship fights after July 2, 1921, although it only includes heavyweight champions that captured undisputed championship (July 2, 1921–present), lineal championship (August 29, 1885 – July 2, 1921) or The Ring championship.

The list only includes title reigns during which the champion:

- has won undisputed championship (July 2, 1921–present), The Ring championship, lineal championship (August 29, 1885 – July 2, 1921)
- held at least two major world heavyweight titles simultaneously
- defeated a fighter that would become world heavyweight champion while the winner's reign was still active

As of September 8, 2026.

Pos.	Name	Reign began-ended	Recognition	Additional recognition	Beaten champions (recognition)	Title fight wins	Fights
1.	Joe Louis	June 22, 1937 — March 1, 1949	undisputed	The Ring		27	
2.	Wladimir Klitschko	1. October 14, 2000 — March 8, 2003; 2. April 22, 2006 — November 28, 2015	1. WBO; 2. unified	2. The Ring	1. Chris Byrd (IBF)	25	
3.	Muhammad Ali	1. February 25, 1964 – March 11, 1969; 2. October 30, 1974 — February 15, 1978; 3. September 15, 1978 — July 3, 1979	1. undisputed 2. undisputed 3. WBA	1. The Ring; 2. The Ring; 3. The Ring		22	
4.	Larry Holmes	June 9, 1978 — September 21, 1985	WBC-to-IBF	The Ring	Mike Weaver (WBA), Tim Witherspoon (WBC)	20	
5.	Tommy Burns	February 23, 1906 — December 26, 1908	lineal	lineal		13	
6.	Lennox Lewis	1. February 7, 1997 — April 22, 2001; 2. November 17, 2001 — February 6, 2004	1. undisputed 2. unified	2. The Ring	1. Evander Holyfield (WBA)	12	
6.	Mike Tyson	1. November 22, 1986 — February 11, 1990; 2. March 16, 1996 — November 9, 1996	1. undisputed 2. unified	1. The Ring		12	
8.	Joe Frazier	March 4, 1968 — January 22, 1973	unified	The Ring		10	
9.	Evander Holyfield	1. October 25, 1990 — November 13, 1992; 2. November 6, 1993 — April 22, 1994; 3. November 9, 1996 — November 13, 1999	1. undisputed 2. unified 3. unified			9	
9.	Ezzard Charles	September 27, 1950 — July 18, 1951	undisputed	The Ring		9	
11.	Floyd Patterson	1. November 30, 1956 — June 26, 1959; 2. June 20, 1960 — September 25, 1962	undisputed	The Ring		8	
11.	James J. Jeffries	June 9, 1899 — May 13, 1905	lineal	lineal		8	
13.	Rocky Marciano	September 23, 1952 — April 27, 1956	undisputed	The Ring		7	
13.	Oleksandr Usyk	September 25, 2021 — June 26, 2026	undisputed	The Ring	Daniel Dubois (IBF)	7	
15.	Jack Dempsey	July 4, 1919 — September 23, 1926	undisputed	The Ring		6	
15.	Jack Johnson	December 26, 1908 — April 5, 1915	lineal	lineal		6	
17.	George Foreman	1. January 22, 1973 — October 30, 1974; 2. November 4, 1994 — June 29, 1995	1. undisputed 2. unified	1. The Ring		5	
17.	Tyson Fury	1. November 28, 2015 — October 12, 2016; 2. February 22, 2020 — May 19, 2024	1. unified 2. WBC	1. The Ring; 2. The Ring		5	
19.	Primo Carnera	June 29, 1933 – June 14, 1934	undisputed	The Ring		3	
19.	Riddick Bowe	November 13, 1992 — November 6, 1993	undisputed			3	
19.	Gene Tunney	September 23, 1926 – July 31, 1928	undisputed	The Ring		3	
19.	Michael Spinks	September 21, 1985 — February 19, 1987	IBF	The Ring		3	
23.	James J. Corbett	September 7, 1892 – March 17, 1897	lineal	lineal		2	
23.	Jess Willard	April 5, 1915 — July 4, 1919	lineal	lineal		2	
23.	Max Schmeling	June 12, 1930 – January 7, 1931	undisputed	The Ring		2	
23.	Vitali Klitschko	April 24, 2004 — November 9, 2005	WBC	The Ring		2	
23.	Jersey Joe Walcott	July 18, 1951 — September 23, 1952	undisputed	The Ring		2	
23.	Sonny Liston	September 25, 1962 — February 25, 1964	undisputed	The Ring		2	
29.	John L. Sullivan	August 29, 1885 — September 7, 1892	lineal	lineal		1	
29.	Bob Fitzsimmons	March 17, 1897 — June 9, 1899	lineal	lineal		1	
29.	Marvin Hart	July 3, 1905 — February 23, 1906	lineal	lineal		1	
29.	Max Baer	June 14, 1934 — June 13, 1935	undisputed	The Ring		1	
29.	James J. Braddock	June 13, 1935 — June 22, 1937	undisputed	The Ring		1	
29.	Ingemar Johansson	June 26, 1959 — June 20, 1960	undisputed	The Ring		1	
29.	Leon Spinks	February 15, 1978 — September 15, 1978	undisputed	The Ring		1	
29.	Buster Douglas	February 11, 1990 — October 25, 1990	undisputed			1	

== Most opponents title was successfully defended against during one reign ==
Keys:

Active title reign
Reign has ended

- Note: Secondary championships are not included.

=== All championship reigns ===
The list does not include The Ring and lineal championship fights after July 2, 1921.

Pos.	Name	Reign began-ended	Recognition	Beaten opponents	Fights
1.	Joe Louis	June 22, 1937 — March 1, 1949	NYSAC, NBA	21	
2.	Larry Holmes	June 9, 1978 — September 21, 1985	WBC, IBF	19	
3.	Wladimir Klitschko	April 22, 2006 — November 28, 2015	WBA, IBF, WBO	17	
4.	Tommy Burns	February 23, 1906 — December 26, 1908	lineal	11	
5.	Muhammad Ali	October 30, 1974 — February 15, 1978	WBA, WBC	10	
6.	Vitali Klitschko	October 11, 2008 - September 8, 2012	WBC	9	
6.	Mike Tyson	November 22, 1986 — February 11, 1990	WBA, WBC, IBF	9	
6.	Joe Frazier	March 4, 1968 — January 22, 1973	NYSAC, WBA, WBC	9	
6.	Deontay Wilder	January 17, 2015 – February 22, 2020	WBC	9	
10.	Lennox Lewis	February 7, 1997 — April 22, 2001	WBA, WBC, IBF	8	
10.	Ezzard Charles	September 27, 1950 — July 18, 1951	NBA, NYSAC	8	
12.	Anthony Joshua	April 9, 2016 – June 1, 2019	WBA, IBF, WBO	6	
12.	James J. Jeffries	June 9, 1899 — May 13, 1905	lineal	6	
12.	Jack Johnson	December 26, 1908 — April 5, 1915	lineal	6	
15.	Rocky Marciano	September 23, 1952 — April 27, 1956	NYSAC, NBA	5	
15.	Jack Dempsey	July 4, 1919 — September 23, 1926	lineal-to-NBA and NYSAC	5	

=== Championship reigns with undisputed/lineal/The Ring championships ===
The list does not include The Ring and lineal championship fights after July 2, 1921, although it only includes title reigns during which the champion captured undisputed championship (July 2, 1921–present), lineal championship (August 29, 1885 – July 2, 1921) or The Ring championship.

Pos.	Name	Reign began-ended	Recognition	Beaten opponents	Fights
1.	Joe Louis	June 22, 1937 — March 1, 1949	NYSAC, NBA	21	
2.	Larry Holmes	June 9, 1978 — September 21, 1985	WBC, IBF	19	
3.	Wladimir Klitschko	April 22, 2006 — November 28, 2015	WBA, IBF, WBO	17	
4.	Tommy Burns	February 23, 1906 — December 26, 1908	lineal	11	
5.	Muhammad Ali	October 30, 1974 — February 15, 1978	WBA, WBC	10	
6.	Mike Tyson	November 22, 1986 — February 11, 1990	WBA, WBC, IBF	9	
6.	Joe Frazier	March 4, 1968 — January 22, 1973	NYSAC, WBA, WBC	9	
8.	Lennox Lewis	February 7, 1997 — April 22, 2001	WBA, WBC, IBF	8	
8.	Ezzard Charles	September 27, 1950 — July 18, 1951	NBA, NYSAC	8	
10.	James J. Jeffries	June 9, 1899 — May 13, 1905	lineal	6	
10.	Jack Johnson	December 26, 1908 — April 5, 1915	lineal	6	
12.	Rocky Marciano	September 23, 1952 — April 27, 1956	NYSAC, NBA	5	
12.	Jack Dempsey	July 4, 1919 — September 23, 1926	lineal-to-NBA and NYSAC	5	

== Most consecutive title defenses ==
Keys:

Active title reign
Reign has ended

- Note: Secondary championships are not included.

=== All championship reigns ===
The list does not include The Ring and lineal championship fights after July 2, 1921. For the purpose of this list, successful title defenses that ended in a draw are also included.

Pos.	Name	Reign began-ended	Recognition	Title defenses	Fights
1.	Joe Louis	June 22, 1937 — March 1, 1949	NYSAC, NBA	26	
2.	Larry Holmes	June 9, 1978 — September 21, 1985	WBC, IBF	19	
3.	Wladimir Klitschko	April 22, 2006 — November 28, 2015	WBA, IBF, WBO	18	
4.	Tommy Burns	February 23, 1906 — December 26, 1908	lineal	13	
5.	Muhammad Ali	October 30, 1974 — February 15, 1978	WBA, WBC	10	
5.	Deontay Wilder	January 17, 2015 – February 22, 2020	WBC	10	
7.	Vitali Klitschko	October 11, 2008 - September 8, 2012	WBC	9	
7.	Mike Tyson	November 22, 1986 — February 11, 1990	WBA, WBC, IBF	9	
7.	Joe Frazier	March 4, 1968 — January 22, 1973	NYSAC, WBA, WBC	9	
7.	Lennox Lewis	February 7, 1997 — April 22, 2001	WBA, WBC, IBF	9	
11.	Ezzard Charles	September 27, 1950 — July 18, 1951	NBA, NYSAC	8	
12.	James J. Jeffries	June 9, 1899 — May 13, 1905	lineal	7	
13.	Rocky Marciano	September 23, 1952 — April 27, 1956	NYSAC, NBA	6	
13.	Anthony Joshua	April 9, 2016 – June 1, 2019	WBA, IBF, WBO	6	
13.	Jack Johnson	December 26, 1908 — April 5, 1915	lineal	6	

=== Championship reigns with undisputed/lineal/The Ring championships ===
The list does not include The Ring and lineal championship fights after July 2, 1921, although it only includes title reigns during which the champion captured undisputed championship (July 2, 1921–present), lineal championship (August 29, 1885 – July 2, 1921) or The Ring championship. For the purpose of this list, successful title defenses that ended in a draw are also included.

Pos.	Name	Reign began-ended	Recognition	Title defenses	Fights
1.	Joe Louis	June 22, 1937 — March 1, 1949	NYSAC, NBA	26	
2.	Larry Holmes	June 9, 1978 — September 21, 1985	WBC, IBF	19	
3.	Wladimir Klitschko	April 22, 2006 — November 28, 2015	WBA, IBF, WBO	18	
4.	Tommy Burns	February 23, 1906 — December 26, 1908	lineal	13	
5.	Muhammad Ali	October 30, 1974 — February 15, 1978	WBA, WBC	10	
6.	Mike Tyson	November 22, 1986 — February 11, 1990	WBA, WBC, IBF	9	
6.	Joe Frazier	March 4, 1968 — January 22, 1973	NYSAC, WBA, WBC	9	
6.	Lennox Lewis	February 7, 1997 — April 22, 2001	WBA, WBC, IBF	9	
9.	Ezzard Charles	September 27, 1950 — July 18, 1951	NBA, NYSAC	8	
10.	James J. Jeffries	June 9, 1899 — May 13, 1905	lineal	7	
11.	Rocky Marciano	September 23, 1952 — April 27, 1956	NYSAC, NBA	6	
11.	Jack Johnson	December 26, 1908 — April 5, 1915	lineal	6	
11.	Oleksandr Usyk	September 25, 2021 — June 26, 2026	WBA, WBC, IBF, WBO	6	
14.	Jack Dempsey	July 4, 1919 — September 23, 1926	lineal-to-NBA and NYSAC	5	

== Longest title reigns ==
Keys:

Active Title Reign
Reign has ended

- Note: Secondary championships are not included.

=== Combined reigns ===
==== All championship reigns ====
The list does not include The Ring and lineal championship fights after July 2, 1921.

As of 1 July 2026.

Pos.	Name	Combined reign	Days as champion	Number of reigns	Title recognition
1.	Wladimir Klitschko	12 years, 0 months, 0 days	4 382	2	WBA, IBF, WBO
2.	Joe Louis	11 years, 8 months, 8 days	4 270	1	NYSAC, NBA
3.	Muhammad Ali	9 years, 1 month, 15 days	3 333	3	NYSAC, WBA, WBC
4.	Lennox Lewis	8 years, 5 months, 13 days	3 086	3	WBA, WBC, IBF
5.	Vitali Klitschko	7 years, 5 months, 28 days	2 735	3	WBC, WBO
6.	Larry Holmes	7 years, 3 months, 12 days	2 661	1	WBC, IBF
7.	Jack Dempsey	7 years, 2 months, 19 days	2 638	1	NYSAC, NBA
8.	John L. Sullivan	7 years, 0 months, 9 days	2 566	1	lineal
9.	Jack Johnson	6 years, 3 months, 11 days	2 292	1	lineal
10.	Evander Holyfield	6 years, 1 month, 1 day	2 223	4	WBA, WBC, IBF
11.	James J. Jeffries	5 years, 11 months, 4 days	2 156	1	lineal
12.	Tyson Fury	5 years, 1 months, 12 days	1 866	2	WBA, WBC, IBF, WBO
13.	Deontay Wilder	5 years, 1 months, 5 days	1 859	1	WBC
14.	Anthony Joshua	4 years, 11 months, 10 days	1 806	2	IBF, WBA, WBO
15.	Joe Frazier	4 years, 10 months, 18 days	1 785	1	NYSAC, WBA, WBC

==== All championship reigns of undisputed champions/lineal champions/The Ring champions ====
The list does not include The Ring and lineal championship fights after July 2, 1921, although it only includes heavyweight champions that captured undisputed championship (July 2, 1921–present), lineal championship (August 29, 1885 – July 2, 1921) or The Ring championship.

As of 1 July 2026.

Pos.	Name	Combined reign	Days as champion	Number of reigns	Title recognition
1.	Wladimir Klitschko	12 years, 0 months, 0 days	4 382	2	WBA, IBF, WBO
2.	Joe Louis	11 years, 8 months, 8 days	4 270	1	NYSAC, NBA
3.	Muhammad Ali	9 years, 1 month, 15 days	3 333	3	NYSAC, WBA, WBC
4.	Lennox Lewis	8 years, 5 months, 13 days	3 086	3	WBA, WBC, IBF
5.	Vitali Klitschko	7 years, 5 months, 28 days	2 735	3	WBC, WBO
6.	Larry Holmes	7 years, 3 months, 12 days	2 661	1	WBC, IBF
7.	Jack Dempsey	7 years, 2 months, 19 days	2 638	1	NYSAC, NBA
8.	John L. Sullivan	7 years, 0 months, 10 days	2 566	1	lineal
9.	Jack Johnson	6 years, 3 months, 11 days	2 292	1	lineal
10.	Evander Holyfield	6 years, 1 month, 1 day	2 223	4	WBA, WBC, IBF
11.	James J. Jeffries	5 years, 11 months, 4 days	2 156	1	lineal
12.	Tyson Fury	5 years, 1 months, 12 days	1 866	2	WBA, WBC, IBF, WBO
13.	Joe Frazier	4 years, 10 months, 18 days	1 785	1	NYSAC, WBA, WBC
14.	Floyd Patterson	4 years, 10 months, 0 days	1 765	2	NYSAC, NBA
15.	Oleksandr Usyk	4 years, 9 months, 1 day	1 735	1	WBA, WBC, IBF, WBO

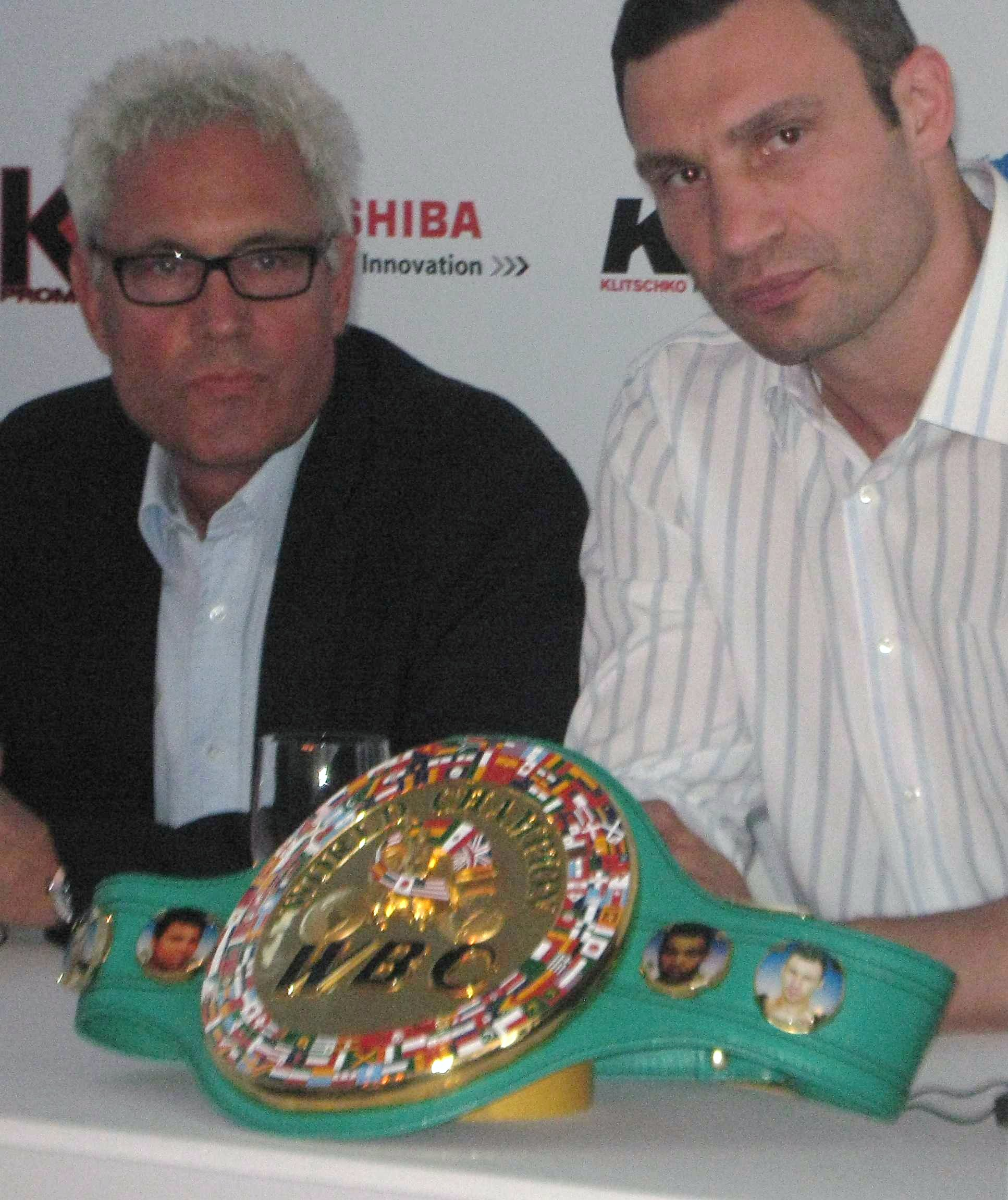
Vitali Klitschko (right) retired as champion in 2005. Following his retirement, the WBC conferred "champion emeritus" status on Klitschko, and assured him he would become the mandatory challenger if and when he decided to return

==== Championship reigns of undisputed/lineal/The Ring champions with undisputed/lineal/The Ring/unified championships, victories over champions ====
The list does not include The Ring and lineal championship fights after July 2, 1921, although it only includes heavyweight champions that captured undisputed championship (July 2, 1921–present), lineal championship (August 29, 1885 – July 2, 1921) or The Ring championship.

The list only includes title reigns during which the champion:

- has won undisputed championship (July 2, 1921–present), The Ring championship, lineal championship (August 29, 1885 – July 2, 1921)
- held at least two major world heavyweight titles simultaneously
- defeated a fighter that would become world heavyweight champion while the winner's reign was still active

As of 1 July 2026.

Pos.	Name	Combined reign	Days as champion	Number of reigns	Title recognition
1.	Wladimir Klitschko	12 years, 0 months, 0 days	4 382	2	WBA, IBF, WBO
2.	Joe Louis	11 years, 8 months, 8 days	4 270	1	NYSAC, NBA
3.	Muhammad Ali	9 years, 1 month, 15 days	3 333	3	NYSAC, WBA, WBC
4.	Larry Holmes	7 years, 3 months, 12 days	2 661	1	WBC, IBF
5.	Jack Dempsey	7 years, 2 months, 19 days	2 638	1	NYSAC, NBA
6.	John L. Sullivan	7 years, 0 months, 10 days	2 566	1	lineal
7.	Lennox Lewis	6 years, 8 months, 3 days	2 437	2	WBA, WBC, IBF
8.	Jack Johnson	6 years, 3 months, 11 days	2 292	1	lineal
9.	James J. Jeffries	5 years, 11 months, 4 days	2 156	1	lineal
10.	Evander Holyfield	5 years, 6 months, 12 days	2 020	3	WBA, WBC, IBF
11.	Tyson Fury	5 years, 1 months, 12 days	1 866	2	WBA, WBC, IBF, WBO
12.	Joe Frazier	4 years, 10 months, 18 days	1 785	1	NYSAC, WBA, WBC
13.	Floyd Patterson	4 years, 10 months, 0 days	1 765	2	NYSAC, NBA
14.	Oleksandr Usyk	4 years, 9 months, 1 day	1 735	1	WBA, WBC, IBF, WBO
15.	James J. Corbett	4 years, 6 months, 10 days	1 652	1	lineal

=== Individual reigns ===
Below is a list of longest reigning heavyweight champions in boxing measured by the individual's longest reign. Both The Ring and lineal championships are included. Career total time as champion (for multiple time champions) does not apply.

==== All championship reigns ====
As of 1 July 2026.

Pos.	Name	Title Reign	Title recognition
1.	Joe Louis	11 years, 8 months, 8 days	NYSAC, NBA
2.	Wladimir Klitschko	9 years, 7 months and 6 days	IBF (+WBA, WBO, The Ring/Lineal)
3.	Larry Holmes	7 years, 3 months, 12 days	WBC-to-IBF (+The Ring/Lineal)
4.	Jack Dempsey	7 years, 2 months, 19 days	lineal
5.	John L. Sullivan	7 years, 0 months, 9 days	lineal
6.	Jack Johnson	6 years, 3 months, 10 days	lineal
7.	Muhammad Ali	5 years, 11 months, 9 days	The Ring/Lineal, (+WBA, WBC stripped)
8.	James J. Jeffries	5 years, 11 months, 4 days	lineal
9.	Vitali Klitschko	5 years, 2 months, 4 days	WBC
10.	Deontay Wilder	5 years, 1 month 5 days	WBC
11.	Oleksandr Usyk	4 years, 11 months and 14 days	WBA (+WBC, IBF, WBO stripped, The Ring)
12.	Joe Frazier	4 years, 10 months, 18 days	NYSAC (+WBA, WBC)
13.	James J. Corbett	4 years, 6 months, 10 days	lineal
14.	Jess Willard	4 years, 2 months, 29 days	lineal
15.	Tyson Fury	4 years, 2 months, 26 days	WBC (+The Ring/Lineal)

==== Championship reigns with undisputed/lineal/The Ring championships ====
The list does not include The Ring and lineal championship fights after July 2, 1921, although it only includes title reigns during which the champion captured undisputed championship (July 2, 1921–present), lineal championship (August 29, 1885 – July 2, 1921) or The Ring championship.

As of 1 July 2026.

Pos.	Name	Title Reign	Title recognition
1.	Joe Louis	11 years, 8 months, 8 days	lineal
2.	Wladimir Klitschko	9 years, 7 months and 6 days	IBF (+WBA, WBO, The Ring/Lineal)
3.	Larry Holmes	7 years, 3 months, 12 days	WBC-to-IBF (+The Ring/Lineal)
4.	Jack Dempsey	7 years, 2 months, 19 days	lineal
5.	John L. Sullivan	7 years, 0 months, 9 days	lineal
6.	Jack Johnson	6 years, 3 months, 10 days	lineal
7.	Muhammad Ali	5 years, 11 months, 9 days	The Ring/Lineal, (+WBA, WBC stripped)
8.	James J. Jeffries	5 years, 11 months, 4 days	lineal
9.	Joe Frazier	4 years, 10 months, 18 days	NYSAC (+WBA, WBC)
10.	Oleksandr Usyk	4 years, 9 months, 1 day	WBA (+WBC, IBF, WBO stripped, The Ring)
11.	James J. Corbett	4 years, 6 months, 10 days	lineal
12.	Jess Willard	4 years, 2 months, 29 days	lineal
13.	Tyson Fury	4 years, 2 months, 26 days	WBC (+The Ring/Lineal)
14.	Lennox Lewis	4 years, 2 months, 15 days	WBC (+IBF, WBA stripped, The Ring/Lineal)
15.	Rocky Marciano	3 years, 11 months, 29 days	lineal

== Title fight finishes ==
=== Fastest stoppages in title fights — 1st round stoppages ===
Date	Fight	Method	Round	Time	Title	Source(s)
April 18, 1998	Herbie Hide def. Damon Reed	TKO	1	0:52	WBO	
May 21, 2005	Lamon Brewster def. Andrew Golota	TKO	1	0:52	WBO	
November 14, 1944	Joe Louis def. Johnny Davis	KO	1	0:53	NYSAC	
April 6, 1900	James J. Jeffries def. John Finnegan	KO	1	0:55	Lineal	
December 10, 1982	Michael Dokes def. Mike Weaver	TKO	1	1:03	WBA	
July 4, 1907	Tommy Burns def. Bill Squires	KO	1	1:28	Lineal	
March 17, 1908	Tommy Burns def. Jem Roche	KO	1	1:28	Lineal	
June 27, 1988	Mike Tyson def. Michael Spinks	KO	1	1:31	WBA, WBC, IBF	
July 21, 1989	Mike Tyson def. Carl Williams	TKO	1	1:33	WBA, WBC, IBF	
October 4, 1997	Lennox Lewis def. Andrew Golota	KO	1	1:35	WBC	
April 22, 1969	Joe Frazier def. Dave Zyglewicz	KO	1	1:36	NYSAC	
September 7, 1996	Mike Tyson def. Bruce Seldon	TKO	1	1:49	WBA	
September 1, 1973	George Foreman def. José Roman	KO	1	2:00	WBA, WBC	
June 22, 1938	Joe Louis def. Max Schmeling	KO	1	2:04	NBA, NYSAC	
September 25, 1962	Sonny Liston def. Floyd Patterson	KO	1	2:06	NYSAC, WBA	
September 18, 1946	Joe Louis def. Tami Mauriello	KO	1	2:09	NBA, NYSAC	
July 22, 1963	Sonny Liston def. Floyd Patterson	KO	1	2:10	WBA, WBC	
May 25, 1965	Muhammad Ali def. Sonny Liston	KO	1	2:12	WBC	
December 12, 1986	James Smith def. Tim Witherspoon	KO	1	2:12	WBA	
May 18, 2019	Deontay Wilder def. Dominic Breazeale	KO	1	2:17	WBC	
March 28, 1906	Tommy Burns def. Jim O'Brien	KO	1	2:18	Lineal	
February 6, 1993	Riddick Bowe def. Michael Dokes	TKO	1	2:19	WBA, IBF	
April 17, 1939	Joe Louis def. Jack Roper	KO	1	2:20	NBA, NYSAC	
May 15, 1953	Rocky Marciano def. Jersey Joe Walcott	KO	1	2:25	NBA, NYSAC	
January 25, 1939	Joe Louis def. John Henry Lewis	KO	1	2:29	NBA, NYSAC	
March 28, 1906	Tommy Burns def. James J. Walker	KO	1	2:55	Lineal	
January 9, 1942	Joe Louis def. Buddy Baer	KO	1	2:56	NBA, NYSAC	
November 4, 2017	Deontay Wilder def. Bermane Stiverne	KO	1	2:59	WBC	
March 19, 2011	Vitali Klitschko def. Odlanier Solís	KO	1	2:59	WBC	

=== Fastest stoppages in title fights — undisputed/The Ring/lineal/unified championship on the line ===
Date	Fight	Method	Round	Time	Title	Source(s)
November 14, 1944	Joe Louis def. Johnny Davis	KO	1	0:53	NYSAC	
April 6, 1900	James J. Jeffries def. John Finnegan	KO	1	0:55	Lineal	
July 4, 1907	Tommy Burns def. Bill Squires	KO	1	1:28	Lineal	
March 17, 1908	Tommy Burns def. Jem Roche	KO	1	1:28	Lineal	
June 27, 1988	Mike Tyson def. Michael Spinks	KO	1	1:31	WBA, WBC, IBF	
July 21, 1989	Mike Tyson def. Carl Williams	TKO	1	1:33	WBA, WBC, IBF	
September 1, 1973	George Foreman def. José Roman	KO	1	2:00	WBA, WBC	
June 22, 1938	Joe Louis def. Max Schmeling	KO	1	2:04	NBA, NYSAC	
September 25, 1962	Sonny Liston def. Floyd Patterson	KO	1	2:06	NYSAC, WBA	
September 18, 1946	Joe Louis def. Tami Mauriello	KO	1	2:09	NBA, NYSAC	
July 22, 1963	Sonny Liston def. Floyd Patterson	KO	1	2:10	WBA, WBC	
May 25, 1965	Muhammad Ali def. Sonny Liston	KO	1	2:12	WBC	
March 28, 1906	Tommy Burns def. Jim O'Brien	KO	1	2:18	Lineal	
February 6, 1993	Riddick Bowe def. Michael Dokes	TKO	1	2:19	WBA, IBF	
April 17, 1939	Joe Louis def. Jack Roper	KO	1	2:20	NBA, NYSAC	
May 15, 1953	Rocky Marciano def. Jersey Joe Walcott	KO	1	2:25	NBA, NYSAC	
January 25, 1939	Joe Louis def. John Henry Lewis	KO	1	2:29	NBA, NYSAC	
March 28, 1906	Tommy Burns def. James J. Walker	KO	1	2:55	Lineal	
January 9, 1942	Joe Louis def. Buddy Baer	KO	1	2:56	NBA, NYSAC	
March 29, 1940	Joe Louis def. Johnny Paychek	TKO	2	0:15	NBA, NYSAC	
May 22, 1993	Riddick Bowe def. Jesse Ferguson	KO	2	0:17	WBA	
August 26, 1904	James J. Jeffries def. Jack Munroe	TKO	2	0:45	Lineal	
November 18, 1970	Joe Frazier def. Bob Foster	KO	2	0:49	WBA, WBC	
September 14, 1923	Jack Dempsey def. Luis Ángel Firpo	KO	2	0:57	NBA, NYSAC	
February 17, 1941	Joe Louis def. Gus Dorazio	KO	2	1:30	NBA, NYSAC	
March 26, 1974	George Foreman def. Ken Norton	TKO	2	2:00	WBA, WBC	
January 22, 1973	George Foreman def. Joe Frazier	TKO	2	2:26	WBA, WBC	
July 15, 2000	Lennox Lewis def. Francois Botha	TKO	2	2:39	WBC, IBF	
April 29, 2000	Lennox Lewis def. Michael Grant	KO	2	2:53	WBC, IBF	
March 21, 1988	Mike Tyson def. Tony Tubbs	TKO	2	2:54	WBA, WBC, IBF	

=== Most opponents beaten in title fights by stoppage ===
Keys:

Active title reign
Reign has ended

Note: The names in italics are champions that did not win undisputed championship (July 2, 1921–present), The Ring championship or lineal championship (August 29, 1885–July 2, 1921)

	Name	Finished opponents	Fights
1.	Joe Louis	20	
2.	Wladimir Klitschko	18	
3.	Larry Holmes	14	
4.	Muhammad Ali	13	
5.	Vitali Klitschko	12	
6.	Lennox Lewis	11	
7.	Mike Tyson	9	
7.	Tommy Burns	9	
9.	Deontay Wilder	8	
9.	Joe Frazier	8	
11.	Floyd Patterson	7	
11.	Anthony Joshua	7	
13.	Rocky Marciano	5	
13.	James J. Jeffries	5	
13.	Ezzard Charles	5	
13.	Jack Dempsey	5	

=== Most title fight wins by stoppage ===
Keys:

Active title reign
Reign has ended

Note: The names in italics are champions that did not win undisputed championship (July 2, 1921–present), The Ring championship or lineal championship (August 29, 1885–July 2, 1921)

	Name	Title fight finishes	Fights
1.	Joe Louis	23	
2.	Wladimir Klitschko	19	
3.	Muhammad Ali	14	
3.	Larry Holmes	14	
5.	Vitali Klitschko	12	
6.	Lennox Lewis	11	
6.	Tommy Burns	11	
8.	Mike Tyson	10	
9.	Deontay Wilder	9	
10.	Joe Frazier	8	
10.	Floyd Patterson	8	
11.	Anthony Joshua	7	
12.	Rocky Marciano	6	
12.	James J. Jeffries	6	
12.	Ezzard Charles	6	

=== Highest knockout-to-beat-opponent percentage in title fights ===
Keys:

Active title reign
Reign has ended

Note 1: The names in italics are champions that did not win undisputed championship (July 2, 1921–present), The Ring championship or lineal championship (August 29, 1885–July 2, 1921)
Note 2: Only fighters who have defeated 5 or more opponents for the world heavyweight title are included

	Name	Opponents fought	Opponents stopped	Percentage	Fights
1.	Rocky Marciano	5	5	100%	
2.	Deontay Wilder	9	8	88.89%	
3.	Joe Louis	23	20	86.96%	
4.	Tommy Burns	12	9	75%	
5.	Joe Frazier	11	8	72.73%	
6.	Jack Dempsey	7	5	71.43%	
6.	James J. Jeffries	7	5	71.43%	
8.	Vitali Klitschko	17	12	70.59%	
9.	Floyd Patterson	10	7	70%	
9.	Anthony Joshua	10	7	70%	
11.	Wladimir Klitschko	26	18	69.23%	
12.	Lennox Lewis	17	11	64.71%	
13.	Mike Tyson	14	9	64.29%	
14.	Muhammad Ali	22	13	59.09%	
15.	Larry Holmes	24	14	58.33%	

=== Highest knockout-to-win percentage in title fights ===
Keys:

Active title reign
Reign has ended

Note 1: The names in italics are champions that did not win undisputed championship (July 2, 1921–present), The Ring championship or lineal championship (August 29, 1885–July 2, 1921)
Note 2: Only fighters who have won 5 or more world heavyweight title fights are included

	Name	Title fights	Title fight stoppages	Percentage	Fights
1.	Rocky Marciano	7	6	85.71%	
2.	Joe Louis	28	23	82.14%	
3.	Tommy Burns	15	11	73.33%	
4.	Vitali Klitschko	17	12	70.59%	
5.	Deontay Wilder	13	9	69.23%	
6.	Joe Frazier	12	8	66.67%	
6.	James J. Jeffries	9	6	66.67%	
8.	Wladimir Klitschko	29	19	65.52%	
9.	Lennox Lewis	17	11	64.71%	
10.	Mike Tyson	16	10	62.5%	
11.	Jack Dempsey	8	5	62.5%	
12.	Floyd Patterson	13	8	61.54%	
13.	Anthony Joshua	12	7	58.33%	
14.	Jack Johnson	7	4	57.14%	
14.	George Foreman	7	4	57.14%	

== Champions by age ==
Keys:

Active title reign
Reign has ended

- Note: Secondary championships are not included.

=== Oldest champions ===
As of September 8, 2026.

This is the list of the oldest heavyweight champions ordered by age at their last day as champion.

==== All championships ====
	Name	Recognition	Last day as champion	Age	Source(s)
1	George Foreman	IBF	June 29, 1995	46 years, 5 months, 18 days	
2	Vitali Klitschko	WBC	December 16, 2013	42 years, 2 months, 26 days	
3	Wladimir Klitschko	WBA, IBF, WBO	November 28, 2015	39 years, 8 months, 3 days	
4	Oleksandr Usyk	WBA, WBC, IBF	June 26, 2026	39 years, 5 months, 9 days	
5	Oleg Maskaev	WBC	March 8, 2008	39 years, 6 days	
6	Jersey Joe Walcott	NBA, NYSAC	September 23, 1952	38 years, 7 months, 23 days	
7	Lennox Lewis	WBC	February 6, 2004	38 years, 5 months, 4 days	
8	Evander Holyfield	WBA	March 3, 2001	38 years, 4 months, 12 days	
9	Corrie Sanders	WBO	February 1, 2004	38 years, 25 days	
10	Jess Willard	Lineal	July 4, 1919	37 years, 6 months, 5 days	

==== World and undisputed/lineal/The Ring championships ====
The list only includes days when the champion held undisputed championship (July 2, 1921–present), lineal championship (August 29, 1885 – July 2, 1921) or The Ring championship alongside a world title.

	Name	Recognition	Additional recognition	Last day as champion	Age	Source(s)
1	Wladimir Klitschko	unified	The Ring	November 28, 2015	39 years, 8 months, 3 days	
2	Oleksandr Usyk	unified	The Ring	June 26, 2026	39 years, 5 months, 9 days	
3	Jersey Joe Walcott	undisputed	The Ring	September 23, 1952	38 years, 7 months, 23 days	
4	Lennox Lewis	WBC	The Ring	February 6, 2004	38 years, 5 months, 4 days	
5	Jess Willard	Lineal	Lineal	July 4, 1919	37 years, 6 months, 5 days	
6	Muhammad Ali	WBA	The Ring	July 3, 1979	37 years, 5 months, 16 days	
7	Jack Johnson	Lineal	Lineal	April 5, 1915	37 years, 0 months, 5 days	
8	Bob Fitzsimmons	Lineal	Lineal	March 17, 1897	36 years, 0 months, 14 days	
9	Larry Holmes	IBF	The Ring	September 21, 1985	35 years, 10 months, 18 days	
10	Joe Louis	undisputed	The Ring	March 1, 1949	34 years, 9 months, 16 days	

=== Youngest champions ===
As of September 8, 2026.

==== All championships ====
	Name	Recognition	Date	Age	Source(s)
1	Mike Tyson	WBC	November 22, 1986	20 years, 4 months, 23 days	
2	Floyd Patterson	NBA, NYSAC	November 30, 1956	21 years, 10 months, 26 days	
3	Muhammad Ali	WBA, WBC	February 25, 1964	22 years, 1 month, 8 days	
4	Joe Louis	NBA, NYSAC	June 22, 1937	23 years, 1 month, 9 days	
5	Jack Dempsey	Lineal	July 4, 1919	24 years, 0 months, 10 days	
6	George Foreman	WBA, WBC	February 22, 1973	24 years, 0 months, 12 days	
7	Joe Frazier	NYSAC	March 4, 1968	24 years, 1 month, 21 days	
8	James J. Jeffries	Lineal	June 9, 1899	24 years, 1 month, 25 days	
9	Michael Dokes	WBA	December 10, 1982	24 years, 4 months	
10	Wladimir Klitschko	WBO	October 14, 2000	24 years, 6 months, 19 days	

==== World and undisputed/lineal/The Ring championships ====
The list only includes days when the champion held undisputed championship (July 2, 1921–present), lineal championship (August 29, 1885 – July 2, 1921) or The Ring championship alongside a world title.

	Name	Recognition	Additional recognition	Date	Age	Source(s)
1	Mike Tyson	undisputed		August 1, 1987	21 years, 1 month, 2 days	
2	Floyd Patterson	undisputed	The Ring	November 30, 1956	21 years, 10 months, 26 days	
3	Muhammad Ali	undisputed	The Ring	February 25, 1964	22 years, 8 days	
4	Joe Louis	undisputed	The Ring	June 22, 1937	23 years, 1 month, 9 days	
5	Jack Dempsey	Lineal	Lineal	July 4, 1919	24 years, 0 months, 10 days	
6	George Foreman	undisputed	The Ring	February 22, 1973	24 years, 0 months, 12 days	
7	James J. Jeffries	Lineal	Lineal	June 9, 1899	24 years, 1 month, 25 days	
8	Leon Spinks	undisputed	The Ring	February 15, 1978	24 years, 7 months, 4 days	
9	Tommy Burns	Lineal	Lineal	January 16, 1902	24 years, 8 months, 6 days	
10	Max Schmeling	undisputed	The Ring	June 12, 1930	24 years, 8 months, 15 days	

== Fastest world championship wins ==
=== By time elapsed from professional debut ===
Ranked by the time elapsed between professional debut and world heavyweight title win.

==== All championships ====
	Name	Professional debut	World title win	Time elapsed	Fights
1	Leon Spinks	January 15, 1977	February 15, 1978	1 year, 1 month	
2	Mike Tyson	March 6, 1985	November 22, 1986	1 year, 8 months, 16 days	
3	John Tate	May 7, 1977	October 20, 1979	2 years, 5 months, 13 days	
4	Anthony Joshua	October 5, 2013	April 9, 2016	2 years, 6 months, 4 days	
5	Joe Frazier	August 16, 1965	March 4, 1968	2 years, 6 months, 17 days	
6	Vitali Klitschko	November 16, 1996	June 26, 1999	2 years, 7 months, 10 days	
7	Joe Louis	July 7, 1934	June 22, 1937	2 years, 11 months, 15 days	
8	Charles Martin	October 27, 2012	January 16, 2016	3 years, 2 months, 20 days	
9	Muhammad Ali	October 29, 1960	January 25, 1964	3 years, 2 months, 27 days	
10	George Foreman	June 23, 1969	January 22, 1973	3 years, 6 months, 30 days	

==== World and undisputed/lineal/The Ring championships ====
The list only includes days when the champion won undisputed championship (July 2, 1921–present), lineal championship (August 29, 1885 – July 2, 1921) or The Ring championship alongside a world title.

	Name	Professional debut	World title win	Recognition	Additional recognition	Time elapsed	Fights
1	Leon Spinks	January 15, 1977	February 15, 1978	undisputed	The Ring	1 year, 1 month	
2	Mike Tyson	March 6, 1985	August 1, 1987	undisputed		2 years, 4 months, 26 days	
3	Joe Louis	July 7, 1934	June 22, 1937	undisputed	The Ring	2 years, 11 months, 15 days	
4	Muhammad Ali	October 29, 1960	January 25, 1964	undisputed	The Ring	3 years, 2 months, 27 days	
5	George Foreman	June 23, 1969	January 22, 1973	undisputed	The Ring	3 years, 6 months, 30 days	
6	James J. Jeffries	October 29, 1895	June 9, 1899	Lineal	Lineal	3 years, 7 months, 11 days	
7	Riddick Bowe	March 6, 1989	November 13, 1992	undisputed		3 years, 8 months, 7 days	
8	Tommy Burns	January 16, 1902	February 23, 1906	Lineal	Lineal	4 years, 1 month, 7 days	
9	Jess Willard	February 5, 1911	April 5, 1915	Lineal	Lineal	4 years, 1 month, 21 days	
10	Floyd Patterson	September 12, 1952	November 30, 1956	undisputed	The Ring	4 years, 2 months, 18 days	

=== By number of bouts fought to win world championship ===
Ranked by the number of bouts boxer fought at the professional level before winning world heavyweight title.

==== All championships ====
	Name	Professional debut	World title win	Fights	Source(s)
1	Leon Spinks	January 15, 1977	February 15, 1978	8	
2	James J. Jeffries	October 29, 1895	June 9, 1899	13	
3	James J. Corbett	July 3, 1886	September 7, 1892	17	
4	Anthony Joshua	October 5, 2013	April 9, 2016	16	
5	Tim Witherspoon	October 10, 1979	March 9, 1984	19	
5	Oleksandr Usyk	September 11, 2013	September 25, 2021	19	
7	John Tate	May 7, 1977	October 20, 1979	20	
7	Joe Frazier	August 16, 1965	March 4, 1968	20	
7	Muhammad Ali	October 29, 1960	January 25, 1964	20	
10	Tony Tubbs	June 14, 1980	April 29, 1985	21	

==== World and undisputed/lineal/The Ring championships ====
The list only includes fights before the champion won undisputed championship (July 2, 1921–present), lineal championship (August 29, 1885 – July 2, 1921) or The Ring championship alongside a world title.

	Name	Professional debut	World title win	Recognition	Additional recognition	Fights	Source(s)
1	Leon Spinks	January 15, 1977	February 15, 1978	undisputed	The Ring	8	
2	James J. Jeffries	October 29, 1895	June 9, 1899	Lineal	Lineal	13	
3	James J. Corbett	July 3, 1886	September 7, 1892	Lineal	Lineal	17	
4	Oleksandr Usyk	September 11, 2013	August 20, 2022	unified	The Ring	20	
4	Muhammad Ali	October 29, 1960	January 25, 1964	undisputed	The Ring	20	
6	Ingemar Johansson	December 5, 1952	June 26, 1959	undisputed	The Ring	22	
7	Joe Frazier	August 16, 1965	February 16, 1970	undisputed	The Ring	25	
7	Evander Holyfield	November 15, 1984	October 25, 1990	undisputed		25	
7	Tyson Fury	December 6, 2008	November 28, 2015	unified	The Ring	25	
10	Michael Spinks	April 16, 1977	September 21, 1985	IBF	The Ring	28	

== Statistics by country ==
The list It includes only major titles, without The Ring and lineal championships (after July 2, 1921).

- Note: Secondary championships are not included.

=== Title fight wins & beaten opponents ===
==== All championship reigns ====
Country	No. of champions	Boxers by Name	Title wins	Beaten opponents	Fights
United States	51	John L. Sullivan, James J. Corbett, James J. Jeffries, Marvin Hart, Jack Johnson, Jess Willard, Jack Dempsey, Gene Tunney, Jack Sharkey, Max Baer, James J. Braddock, Joe Louis, Ezzard Charles, Jersey Joe Walcott, Rocky Marciano, Floyd Patterson, Sonny Liston, Muhammad Ali, Ernie Terrell, Joe Frazier, Jimmy Ellis, George Foreman, Leon Spinks, Ken Norton, Larry Holmes, John Tate, Mike Weaver, Michael Dokes, Tim Witherspoon, Pinklon Thomas, Greg Page, Tony Tubbs, Michael Spinks, Mike Tyson, James Smith, Tony Tucker, Buster Douglas, Evander Holyfield, Michael Moorer, Riddick Bowe, Oliver McCall, Bruce Seldon, Chris Byrd, John Ruiz, Hasim Rahman, Roy Jones Jr., Lamon Brewster, Shannon Briggs, Deontay Wilder, Charles Martin, Andy Ruiz Jr.*	233	160	
Ukraine	3	Vitali Klitschko, Wladimir Klitschko, Oleksandr Usyk	47	41	
United Kingdom	8	Bob Fitzsimmons, Lennox Lewis*, Frank Bruno, Herbie Hide, David Haye, Tyson Fury, Anthony Joshua, Daniel Dubois	39	35	
Canada	4	Tommy Burns, Trevor Berbick*, Bermane Stiverne, Lennox Lewis*	30	28	
Russia	4	Nikolai Valuev, Oleg Maskaev, Sultan Ibragimov, Murat Gassiev*	10	8	
Italy	1	Primo Carnera	3	3	
New Zealand	1	Joseph Parker	3	3	
Germany	1	Max Schmeling	2	2	
South Africa	2	Gerrie Coetzee, Corrie Sanders	2	2	
Uzbekistan	1	Ruslan Chagaev	2	2	
Armenia	1	Murat Gassiev*	1	1	
Belarus	1	Siarhei Liakhovich	1	1	
Croatia	1	Filip Hrgović	1	1	
Jamaica	1	Trevor Berbick*	1	1	
Nigeria	1	Samuel Peter	1	1	
Sweden	1	Ingemar Johansson	1	1	

==== All championship reigns of undisputed champions/lineal champions/The Ring champions ====
The list does not include The Ring and lineal championship fights after July 2, 1921, although it only includes heavyweight champions that captured undisputed championship (July 2, 1921–present), lineal championship (August 29, 1885 – July 2, 1921) or The Ring championship.

Country	No. of champions	Boxers by Name	Title wins	Beaten opponents	Fights
United States	27	John L. Sullivan, James J. Corbett, James J. Jeffries, Marvin Hart, Jack Johnson, Jess Willard, Jack Dempsey, Gene Tunney, Jack Sharkey, Max Baer, James J. Braddock, Joe Louis, Ezzard Charles, Jersey Joe Walcott, Rocky Marciano, Floyd Patterson, Sonny Liston, Muhammad Ali, Joe Frazier, George Foreman, Leon Spinks, Larry Holmes, Michael Spinks, Mike Tyson, Buster Douglas, Evander Holyfield, Riddick Bowe	177	134	
Ukraine	3	Vitali Klitschko, Wladimir Klitschko, Oleksandr Usyk	47	41	
Canada	2	Tommy Burns, Lennox Lewis*	28	26	
United Kingdom	3	Bob Fitzsimmons, Lennox Lewis*, Tyson Fury	21	20	
Italy	1	Primo Carnera	3	3	
Germany	1	Max Schmeling	2	2	
Sweden	1	Ingemar Johansson	1	1	

==== Championship reigns of undisputed/lineal/The Ring champions with undisputed/lineal/The Ring/unified championships, victories over champions ====
The list does not include The Ring and lineal championship fights after July 2, 1921, although it only includes heavyweight champions that captured undisputed championship (July 2, 1921–present), lineal championship (August 29, 1885 – July 2, 1921) or The Ring championship.

The list only includes title reigns during which the champion:

- has won undisputed championship (July 2, 1921–present), The Ring championship, lineal championship (August 29, 1885 – July 2, 1921)
- held at least two major world heavyweight titles simultaneously
- defeated a fighter that would become world heavyweight champion while the winner's reign was still active

Country	No. of champions	Boxers by Name	Title wins	Beaten opponents	Fights
United States	27	John L. Sullivan, James J. Corbett, James J. Jeffries, Marvin Hart, Jack Johnson, Jess Willard, Jack Dempsey, Gene Tunney, Jack Sharkey, Max Baer, James J. Braddock, Joe Louis, Ezzard Charles, Jersey Joe Walcott, Rocky Marciano, Floyd Patterson, Sonny Liston, Muhammad Ali, Joe Frazier, George Foreman, Leon Spinks, Larry Holmes, Michael Spinks, Mike Tyson, Buster Douglas, Evander Holyfield, Riddick Bowe	176	133	
Ukraine	3	Vitali Klitschko, Wladimir Klitschko, Oleksandr Usyk	34	29	
Canada	2	Tommy Burns, Lennox Lewis*	25	23	
United Kingdom	3	Bob Fitzsimmons, Lennox Lewis*, Tyson Fury	17	16	
Italy	1	Primo Carnera	3	3	
Germany	1	Max Schmeling	2	2	
Sweden	1	Ingemar Johansson	1	1	

=== Title streaks ===
Only major titles, without The Ring and lineal championships (after July 2, 1921), are included.

==== All championship reigns ====
For the purpose of this list, successful title defenses that ended in a draw are also included.

Country	Champion	Title defenses	Beaten opponents	Fights
United States	Joe Louis	26	21	
Ukraine	Wladimir Klitschko	18	17	
Canada	Tommy Burns	13	11	
United Kingdom	Lennox Lewis	9	8	
Russia	Nikolai Valuev	3	3	
Italy	Primo Carnera	2	2	
New Zealand	Joseph Parker	2	2	
Armenia	Murat Gassiev	1	1	
Germany	Max Schmeling	1	1	
Uzbekistan	Ruslan Chagaev	1	1	

==== Championship reigns with undisputed/lineal/The Ring championships ====
The list does not include The Ring and lineal championship fights after July 2, 1921, although it only includes title reigns during which the champion captured undisputed championship (July 2, 1921–present), lineal championship (August 29, 1885 – July 2, 1921) or The Ring championship. For the purpose of this list, successful title defenses that ended in a draw are also included.

Country	Champion	Title defenses	Beaten opponents	Fights
United States	Joe Louis	26	21	
Ukraine	Wladimir Klitschko	18	17	
Canada	Tommy Burns	13	11	
United Kingdom	Lennox Lewis	9	8	
Italy	Primo Carnera	2	2	
Germany	Max Schmeling	1	1	

== See also ==
- List of world heavyweight boxing champions
- List of current world boxing champions
- List of WBA world champions
- List of WBC world champions
- List of IBF world champions
- List of WBO world champions
- List of The Ring world champions
- List of undefeated boxing world champions (retired only)
- List of undisputed world boxing champions
