= Naud Junction (Los Angeles) =

Human settlement in California, United States of America

Coordinates: 34.061353°N 118.235282°W

Naud Junction was an area in northern Downtown Los Angeles, California. It was located at the junction of Main Street and Alameda Street, where Southern Pacific Railroad trains veered off Alameda to tracks along Alhambra Avenue and the Los Angeles River.

== History ==
It is named for French-American warehouseman Edouard Naud, who built a warehouse at the junction in 1878. Naud Junction was marked by a signal tower built at Alameda and Ord streets in 1898. This was torn down in 1940, after Union Station was built.

== Boxing pavilion ==
From 1905 to 1913, Naud Junction was the location of the city of Los Angeles' primary boxing pavilion, which was built by promoter Thomas McCarey. The pavilion paid host to both the world middleweight championship between Hugo Kelly and Tommy Burns, a heavyweight championship bout between Burns and Marvin Hart, and a featherweight championship bout between Abe Attell and Frankie Nell. McCarey said the greatest fight he ever witnessed was a match at Naud Junction between "two Negro fighters," Jack Johnson and Denver Ed Martin. McCarey told a reporter, "Neither of them made a mistake for twelve rounds, and Denver Ed finally thought he had fooled Johnson, and we saw one of the greatest exhibitions in ring history from then on. Johnson finally won a decision that time and later stopped Denver Ed. I believe either one could have whipped any man that ever lived at that time."

Naud Junction was also witness to a Billy Sunday crusade in 1909.

The Naud Junction boxing arena burned down on September 22, 1915.

== See also ==
- Vernon Arena
