= Tommy Burns (Canadian boxer) =

Canadian boxer (1881–1955)

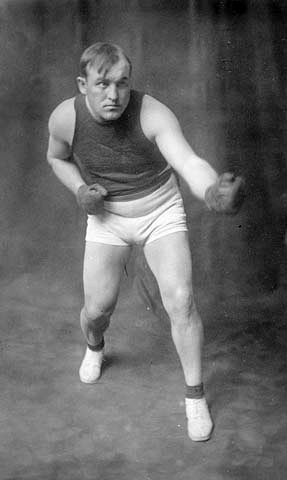
- Tommy Burns, circa 1912

Personal information
- Nickname: The Little Giant of Hanover
- Born: Noah Brusso; 17 June 1881 Hanover, Ontario, Canada
- Died: 10 May 1955 (aged 73) Vancouver, British Columbia, Canada
- Height: 5 ft 7 in (170 cm)
- Weight: Welterweight; Middleweight; Heavyweight

Boxing career
- Reach: 73 in (185 cm)
- Stance: Orthodox

Boxing record
- Total fights: 61
- Wins: 47
- Win by KO: 35
- Losses: 5
- Draws: 9

Tommy Burns (born Noah Brusso; 17 June 1881 – 10 May 1955) was a Canadian professional boxer. He remains the only Canadian-born fighter to win the World Heavyweight Championship and is the shortest champion in the division's history. Starting out at welterweight, he is the lightest boxer to eventually become heavyweight champion, and he is one of only two heavyweight champions to have fought below middleweight; the other boxer to do so was Roy Jones Jr., who began at light middleweight. The first to travel the globe in defending his title, Burns made 13 title defences against 11 different boxers, despite often being smaller than his opponents.

Burns took on all challengers as Heavyweight Champion, leading to his legendary bout with the African-American Jack Johnson. According to his biographer, Burns insisted, "I will defend my title against all comers, none barred. By this I mean white, black, Mexican, Indian, or any other nationality. I propose to be the champion of the world, not the white, or the Canadian, or the American. If I am not the best man in the heavyweight division, I don't want the title."

== Early life ==
Noah Brusso was born in Normanby Township near Hanover, Ontario, as the twelfth of thirteen children of an impoverished German-Canadian family. His family lived in several locations around Ontario's Grey County and Bruce County before moving to Galt, Ontario. Noah grew up in difficult circumstances; five of his siblings died before reaching adulthood. Aged twenty, Brusso began his prizefighting career in January 1902 in Detroit, Michigan as a welterweight. In June 1903, he was discovered playing lacrosse under an assumed name for a Detroit team that was playing in Chatham, Ontario.

== Boxing career ==
Film of the 1907 heavyweight championship prize fight with Squires, shot by the Miles Brothers

After starting his boxing career under his real name, in 1904 Brusso took the Scottish-sounding name of Tommy Burns. He was 5 feet 7 inches (170 cm) tall and about 175 pounds (79 kg), but his relatively small size did not stop him from becoming the world heavyweight boxing champion. When Burns met Marvin Hart for the heavyweight championship of the world in Los Angeles on 23 February 1906, Burns was a 2–1 underdog and the betting was 10–7 that he would not last ten rounds. Burns won a twenty-round decision and went on to defend his title eleven times within a period of less than three years.

All previous gloved world champs had been European-American U.S. citizens (except for Robert Fitzsimmons, of the United Kingdom and New Zealand), who defended their titles only against other white opponents (although Fitzsimmons fought Jack Johnson after losing the title). Burns travelled the globe, beating the champions of England, Ireland, France and Australia. It has been claimed that Burns was the first heavyweight champion to fight with a Jewish challenger, defeating British boxer Joseph "Jewey" Smith, in a 1908 bout held in Paris. However, "Jewey" was a diminutive of Joseph, not a reference to Smith's religion.

Burns once defended his title twice in one night, although some historians refuse to accept those wins as title defences, insisting they were exhibition bouts. But in newspapers at the time, they were advertised as heavyweight title fights. If those defences are counted in his record, he successfully defended his title 13 times.

=== Burns-Johnson Fight ===
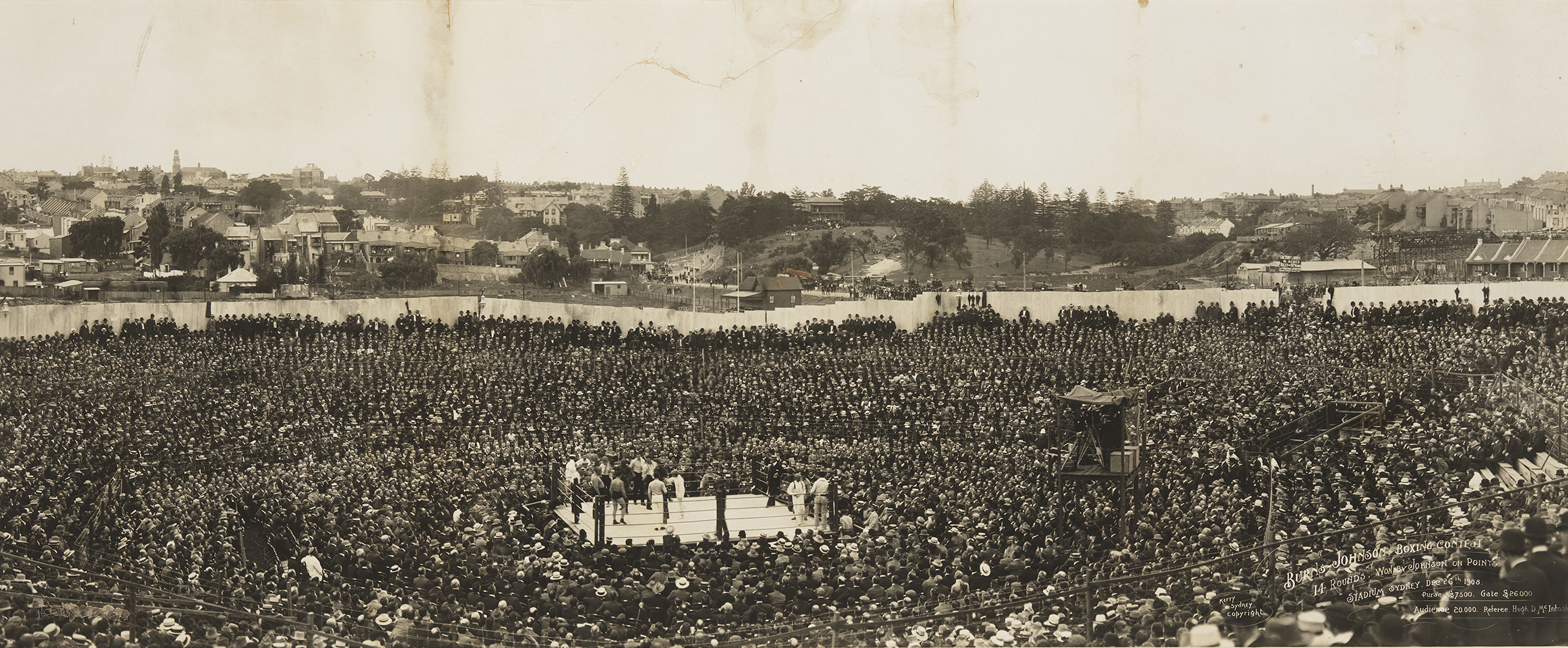
Burns-Johnson boxing fight, Rushcutters Bay, Sydney, 26 December 1908, by Charles Kerry

In December 1908, after months of delaying arranging the fight, Burns agreed to a bout with Jack Johnson and became the first fighter to hold to a heavyweight championship bout with an African American. He had refused to fight Johnson until Australian promoter Hugh D. McIntosh paid him $30,000 for the fight (Johnson received $5,000).

Internationally the press advertised the fight as a race war. Johnson, known as the "Galveston Giant", defied convention of the time by dressing lavishly, driving fancy cars, and breaking the taboo of dating white women. Sydney's Illustrated Sporting and Dramatic News published an explicitly racist editorial, stating: "Citizens who have never prayed before are supplicating Providence to give the white man a strong arm with which to belt [Johnson, whom the newspaper called a racial slur] into oblivion." The Sydney Australian Star published a cartoon depicting the fighters in the ring, surrounded by an audience of white and black races. The caption under the cartoon read “This battle may in future be looked back upon as the first great battle of an inevitable race war … There is more in this fight to be considered than the mere title of pugilistic champion of the world.”

A crowd of twenty thousand fans gathered in the Sydney suburb stadium on Boxing Day to witness the fight. Burns entered the fight supposedly suffering from the effects from jaundice or influenza and weighed in at 168 pounds (76 kg)—15 pounds (6.8 kg) lighter than his previous fight, and well below Johnson's 192 pounds (87 kg). In the 14th of 20 three-minute rounds, Burns began to stagger as Johnson hammered him at will. The police rushed the ring, stopped the camera, and ended the fight to avoid the spectacle of a white champion knocked out by a black fighter. The fight concluded with Burns failing to land a single punch. Burns later claimed the disruption was due to spectators' concern he had a broken jaw. He also stated numerous right uppercuts from Johnson led to swelling on his face and the request to stop the fight. Referee Hugh McIntosh awarded the decision and the title to Johnson.

Following the fight, the American novelist Jack London composed a front-page report for the Australian Star. London and his wife Charmian Kittredge had attended the fight, which he described a "hopeless slaughter."

The fight! The word is a misnomer. There was no fight. No Armenian massacre would compare with the hopeless slaughter which took place in the Stadium. It was not a case of too much Johnson, but of all Johnson. A golden smile tells the story and the golden smile was Johnson’s … The fight had all the seeming of a playful Ethiopian at loggerheads with a small and futile white man; of a grown man cuffing a naughty child..

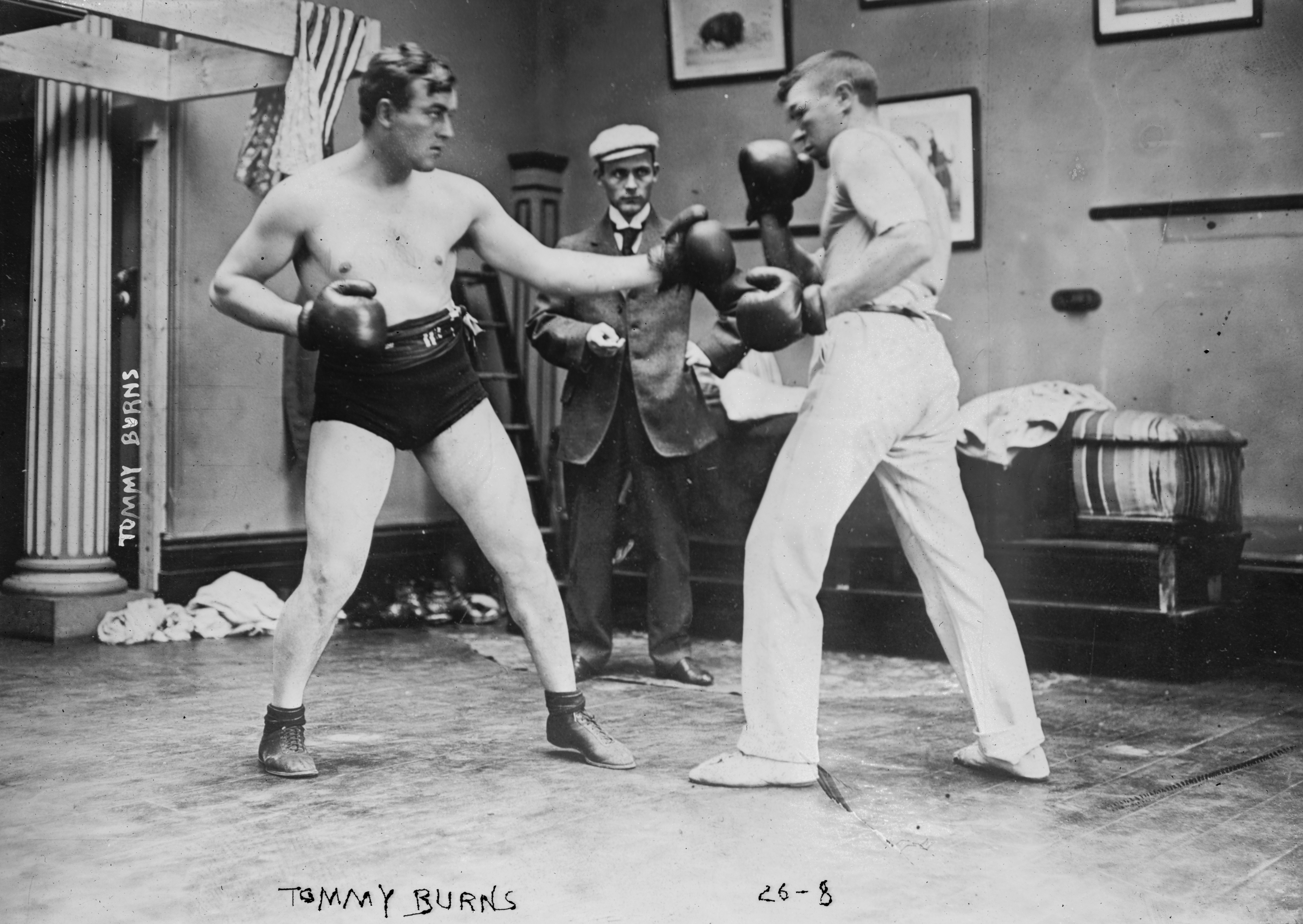
Burns (left) during a sparring session

In a filmed interview, Burns ranked Johnson as the second-best boxer up to his time, after James J. Jeffries. Johnson defeated Jeffries in 1910 when Jeffries, who had not fought for six years, came out of retirement to fight.

In 1909 in Vancouver, British Columbia, Johnson told a crowd of people that Burns deserved credit as the only white heavyweight who ever gave a black man a chance to win the title. He said, "Let me say of Mr. Burns, a Canadian and one of yourselves, that he has done what no one else ever did, he gave a black man a chance for the championship. He was beaten, but he was game."

=== Aftermath of Title Loss ===
Burns continued to box occasionally after dropping the title. During the Great War he joined the Canadian army, serving as a physical fitness instructor for troops in Canada. In 1920, one month after his 39th birthday, Burns challenged British champion Joe Beckett. Burns was stopped in the seventh round when, after suffering two knockdowns, his corner threw in the towel to end the fight.

== Life after boxing ==
After retirement, Burns promoted some boxing shows. In 1917, Burns purchased the Huntington Inn, a three-story hotel located at Eighth Street and Ocean Avenue (later renamed Pacific Coast Highway) in Huntington Beach. At this location he established the Burns Health Farm, which advertised treatment of various ailments "without the aid of drugs or the surgeon's knife". In 1928, Burns moved to New York City where he ran a speakeasy in an extravagantly furnished apartment he allegedly owned on the second floor of 53 West 72nd Street. On October 17, 1930, Burns was one of three men arrested by prohibition agents at this address in connection with illegal possession and distribution of alcohol. Although he was wealthy at the end of his boxing career, the Wall Street crash of 1929 and the Great Depression wiped out his fortune. Burns went to work as an insurance salesman and security guard, among other jobs.

In 1948, Burns was ordained as a minister. At the time of his death, he was an evangelist living in Coalinga, California.

He died while visiting a church friend in Vancouver, British Columbia, suffering a heart attack at age 73. Four people attended his burial at Ocean View Cemetery in Burnaby, British Columbia. He was interred in an unmarked pauper's grave. In 1961, a Vancouver sports writer raised funds to commission a memorial plaque for Burns's grave.

== Legacy ==
Burns is best remembered today as the man whom Jack Johnson beat to become the first black heavyweight champion. Burns was also the first truly international heavyweight champion, defending his title in America, England, Ireland, France and Australia. His 1907 title defence against Gunner Moir in London was the first World Heavyweight championship fight of the gloved era to be held outside of the United States. Standing at just 5'7", Burns is the shortest heavyweight champion in history, while only Bob Fitzsimmons weighed less in a world heavyweight title fight than Burns's 168½ lbs when losing the championship to Jack Johnson. During his championship reign, Burns typically weighed between 170 and 180 lbs. His reach was 74", three inches longer than Mike Tyson's.

Burns's eight consecutive title defences by knockout or stoppage is equalled only by Larry Holmes and remains a record for the heavyweight division. Burns was the first World Heavyweight champion to win the title on points. Although physically over-matched against Johnson, who handed him his first stoppage loss, Burns did not lose inside the distance again until the final fight of his career, at the age of 39. However, some sources record the result as Johnson having won the title on points after the bout was stopped by the police. The filming of the fight was stopped due to the one-sided nature of the contest, however, and regardless of the official ruling, is generally considered by historians to be a stoppage victory for Johnson.

Burns's reign as heavyweight champion lasted for two years, ten months and three days, the 19th-longest reign in heavyweight history. His eleven consecutive successful title defences is the joint-fourth highest total in heavyweight history, alongside Vitali Klitschko and behind Wladimir Klitschko (18 defences), Larry Holmes (20 defences) and Joe Louis (25 defences). Many of Burns's title challengers, however, were not of World Championship quality, as he frequently defended against the best available local heavyweights while touring the world. In Burns's first defense of the title, for instance, he knocked out James J. Walker in the first round. Walker's record going into the bout was 1–5 and he had lost by stoppage in five of his previous six bouts prior to challenging Burns.

Burns also defended the title three times against Bill Squires. Squires, the Australian heavyweight champion, was actually a 10–9 favourite to defeat Burns, yet lost in the first round. Nevertheless, Squires obtained two further shots at Burns's title, despite losing two of his next three fights following their first bout. His trilogy with Burns is notable, however, as their title fights took place across three different continents (America, Europe and Australia). This remains the only instance in history where two boxers have fought three times for a World title with each fight taking place on a different continent. Burns's best win as champion was a 20-round points decision over Philadelphia Jack O'Brien, who two years previously had stopped Bob Fitzsimmons to claim the World light-Heavyweight championship.

Footage of his 1907 title defence against Bill Lang shows Burns to have been an aggressive counter-puncher, who was strong on the inside and a good finisher.

Although Trevor Berbick and Bermane Stiverne have also won a version of the World Heavyweight Championship while Canadian citizens, Burns remains the only Canadian-born heavyweight champion in history. (Berbick and Stiverne were born in Jamaica and Haiti respectively.)

== Honours ==
Australian boxer and Welterweight champion Geoffrey Mostyn Murphy would fight under the ring name "Tommy Burns", in honour of his Canadian namesake.

Burns has since been posthumously inducted into the following sporting institutions: the Canadian Boxing Hall of Fame, the Canadian Sports Hall of Fame in 1955, the International Boxing Hall of Fame on 9 June 1996, and the Ontario Sports Hall of Fame in 2012.

== Professional boxing record ==
61 fights	47 wins	5 losses
By knockout	35	1
By decision	10	4
By disqualification	2	0
Draws	9	

No.	Result	Record	Opponent	Type	Round, time	Date	Location	Notes
61	Loss	47–5–9	Joe Beckett	RTD	7 (20)	16 July 1920	Prince Rupert, British Columbia, Canada	For Commonwealth heavyweight title
60	Win	47–4–9	Bob Bracken	KO	4 (10)	19 September 1918	Prince Rupert, British Columbia, Canada	
59	Win	46–4–9	Battling Brandt	KO	4 (10)	26 January 1914	Taft, California, U.S.	
58	Draw	45–4–9	Arthur Pelkey	NWS	6	2 April 1913	Manchester Arena, Calgary, Canada	
57	Win	45–4–8	Bill Rickard	TKO	6 (15)	8 August 1912	Saskatchewan, Canada	Won vacant Canadian heavyweight title
56	Win	44–4–8	Bill Lang	PTS	20	11 April 1910	Sydney Stadium, Sydney, Australia	Won Commonwealth and Australian heavyweight titles
55	Loss	43–4–8	Jack Johnson	PTS	14 (20)	26 December 1908	Sydney Stadium, Sydney, Australia	Lost world heavyweight title. The fight film was also stopped by the police. (National Police Gazette)
54	Win	43–3–8	Bill Lang	KO	6 (20)	3 September 1908	West Melbourne Stadium, Melbourne, Australia	Retained world heavyweight title (National Police Gazette)
53	Win	42–3–8	Bill Squires	KO	13 (20)	24 August 1908	Sydney Stadium, Sydney, Australia	Retained world heavyweight title (National Police Gazette)
52	Win	41–3–8	Bill Squires	KO	5 (10)	13 June 1908	Neuilly Bowling Palace, Paris, France	Retained world heavyweight title (National Police Gazette)
51	Win	40–3–8	Jewey Smith	KO	5 (10)	18 April 1908	Neuilly Bowling Palace, Paris, France	Retained world heavyweight title (National Police Gazette)
50	Win	39–3–8	Jem Roche	KO	1 (20), 1:28	17 March 1908	Theatre Royal, Dublin, Ireland	Retained world heavyweight title (National Police Gazette)
49	Win	38–3–8	Jack Palmer	KO	4 (20)	10 February 1908	Wonderland London, England	Retained world heavyweight title (National Police Gazette)
48	Win	37–3–8	Gunner Moir	KO	10 (20)	2 December 1907	National Sporting Club, London, England	Retained world heavyweight title (National Police Gazette)
47	Win	36–3–8	Bill Squires	KO	1 (45), 1:28	4 July 1907	Mission Street Arena, Colma, California, U.S.	Retained world heavyweight title; Won vacant world heavyweight title (National Police Gazette)
46	Win	35–3–8	Philadelphia Jack O'Brien	PTS	20	8 May 1907	Naud Junction Pavilion, Los Angeles, California, U.S.	Retained world heavyweight title
45	Draw	34–3–8	Philadelphia Jack O'Brien	PTS	20	28 November 1906	Naud Junction Pavilion, Los Angeles, California, U.S.	Retained world heavyweight title
44	Win	34–3–7	Fireman Jim Flynn	KO	15 (20)	2 October 1906	Naud Junction Pavilion, Los Angeles, California, U.S.	Retained world heavyweight title
43	Win	33–3–7	James J Walker	KO	1 (10), 2:55	28 March 1906	National Athletic Club, San Diego, California, U.S.	Retained world heavyweight title
42	Win	32–3–7	Jim O'Brien	KO	1 (10), 2:18	28 March 1906	National Athletic Club, San Diego, California, U.S.	Retained world heavyweight title
41	Win	31–3–7	Marvin Hart	PTS	20	23 February 1906	Pacific Athletic Club, Los Angeles, California, U.S.	Won world heavyweight title
40	Loss	30–3–7	Jack Twin Sullivan	PTS	20	17 October 1905	Pacific Athletic Club, Los Angeles, California, U.S.	Sullivan claimed the American and world middleweight titles
39	Win	30–2–7	Dave Barry	TKO	20 (20), 2:18	31 August 1905	Woodward's Pavilion, San Francisco, California, U.S.	Retained Pacific Coast middleweight title
38	Draw	29–2–7	Hugo Kelly	PTS	20	28 July 1905	Light Guard Armory, Detroit, Michigan, U.S.	
37	Draw	29–2–6	Hugo Kelly	PTS	10	7 June 1905	Light Guard Armory, Detroit, Michigan, U.S.	For Kelly's world middleweight title claim
36	Win	29–2–5	Dave Barry	PTS	20	2 May 1905	Germania Hall, Tacoma, Washington, U.S.	Won Pacific Coast middleweight title
35	Draw	28–2–5	Jack Twin Sullivan	PTS	20	7 March 1905	Tacoma Athletic Club, Tacoma, Washington U.S.	Billed for the world middleweight title
34	Win	28–2–4	Joe Schildt	KO	6	31 January 1905	Ballard, Seattle, Washington U.S.	
33	Loss	27–2–4	Philadelphia Jack O'Brien	NWS	6	7 October 1904	Panorama Building, Milwaukee, Wisconsin, U.S.	
32	Draw	27–1–4	Billy Woods	PTS	15	16 September 1904	Seattle Theater, Seattle, Washington, U.S.	
31	Win	27–1–3	Cyclone Kelly	KO	4 (20)	19 August 1904	Germania Hall, Tacoma, Washington, U.S.	
30	Win	26–1–3	Hans Erickson	KO	3	9 July 1904	Kemmerer, Wyoming, U.S.	
29	Win	25–1–3	Joe Wardinski	KO	1	1 July 1904	Salt Lake City, Utah, U.S.	
28	Win	24–1–3	Tony Caponi	PTS	6	9 April 1904	Chicago Athletic Association, Chicago, Illinois, U.S.	
27	Draw	23–1–3	Tony Caponi	PTS	6	18 March 1904	Battery D Armory, Chicago, Illinois, U.S.	
26	Draw	23–1–2	Mike Schreck	PTS	6	27 February 1904	Milwaukee, Wisconsin, U.S.	
25	Win	23–1–1	George Shrosbree	KO	5	26 February 1904	Battery D Armory, Chicago, Illinois, U.S.	
24	Win	22–1–1	Ben O'Grady	KO	3 (10)	28 January 1904	Detroit Athletic Club, Detroit, Michigan, U.S.	
23	Win	21–1–1	Tom McCune	PTS	10	31 December 1903	Detroit Athletic Club, Detroit, Michigan, U.S.	Retained Michigan State middleweight title
22	Win	20–1–1	Jack O'Donnell	KO	11	25 November 1903	Evanston, Illinois, U.S.	Retained Michigan State middleweight title
21	Win	19–1–1	Jack Butler	KO	2	8 November 1903	Sault Ste. Marie, Michigan, U.S.	Retained Michigan State middleweight title
20	Draw	18–1–1	Billy Moore	PTS	10	24 October 1903	Amphidrome, Houghton, Michigan, U.S.	Retained Michigan State middleweight title
19	Win	18–1	Jack Hammond	KO	3 (10)	12 October 1903	Soo Opera House, Sault Ste. Marie, Michigan, U.S.	Retained Michigan State middleweight title
18	Win	17–1	Jim Duggan	KO	9	25 September 1903	Amphidrome, Houghton, Michigan, U.S.	Won Michigan State middleweight title
17	Win	16–1	Earl Thompson	KO	3	18 April 1903	Detroit, Michigan, U.S.	
16	Win	15–1	Dick Smith	KO	3 (6)	25 March 1903	Delray Athletic Club, Delray, Michigan, U.S.	
15	Win	14–1	Reddy Phillips	DQ	2 (6)	25 March 1903	Delray Athletic Club, Delray, Michigan, U.S.	
14	Win	13–1	Jim O'Brien	PTS	10	13 February 1903	Handloser Hall, Delray, Michigan, U.S.	
13	Loss	12–1	Mike Schreck	PTS	10	16 January 1903	Light Guard Armory, Detroit, Michigan, U.S.	
12	Win	12–0	Tom McCune	KO	7 (10)	26 December 1902	Light Guard Armory, Detroit, Michigan, U.S.	
11	Win	11–0	Reddy Phillips	TKO	9 (10)	6 November 1902	Lansing, Michigan, U.S.	
10	Win	10–0	Jack O'Donnell	KO	11	19 September 1902	Butler, Indiana, U.S.	
9	Win	9–0	Dick Smith	PTS	10	8 July 1902	Mount Clemens, Michigan, U.S.	
8	Win	8–0	Dick Smith	KO	2	27 June 1902	Nelson's Opera House, Mount Clemens, Michigan, U.S.	
7	Win	7–0	Ed Sholtreau	PTS	10	16 May 1902	Detroit Athletic Club, Detroit, Michigan, U.S.	
6	Win	6–0	Ed Sholtreau	TKO	1 (10), 1:35	18 April 1902	Detroit Athletic Club, Detroit, Michigan, U.S.	
5	Win	5–0	Billy Walsh	PTS	6	4 April 1902	Handloser Hall, Delray, Michigan, U.S.	
4	Win	4–0	Archie Steele	DQ	2 (6)	5 March 1902	Detroit Athletic Club, Detroit, Michigan, U.S.	
3	Win	3–0	Harry Peppers	RTD	2 (8)	3 March 1902	Weyler's Hall, Detroit, Michigan, U.S.	
2	Win	2–0	Billy Walsh	TKO	5 (8)	5 February 1902	Detroit Athletic Club, Detroit, Michigan, U.S.	
1	Win	1–0	Fred Thornton	TKO	5 (10)	16 January 1902	Handloser Hall, Delray, Michigan, U.S.	

== See also ==
- List of heavyweight boxing champions
- The Burns-Johnson Fight – contemporary documentary on the fight

Awards and achievements
Preceded by Marvin Hart	World Heavyweight Champion; 23 February 1906 – 26 December 1908	Succeeded by Jack Johnson
Records
Preceded by James J. Jeffries; 6	Most opponents beaten for the world heavyweight championship 11; 7th opponent beaten on 2 December 1907; 3 September 1908–16 December 1940	Succeeded by Joe Louis
Preceded by James J. Jeffries; 8	Most wins in world heavyweight championship fights 13; 9th win on 17 March 1908; 3 September 1908–31 January 1941	Succeeded by Joe Louis
