= Jem Roche =

Irish boxer and Gaelic football coach

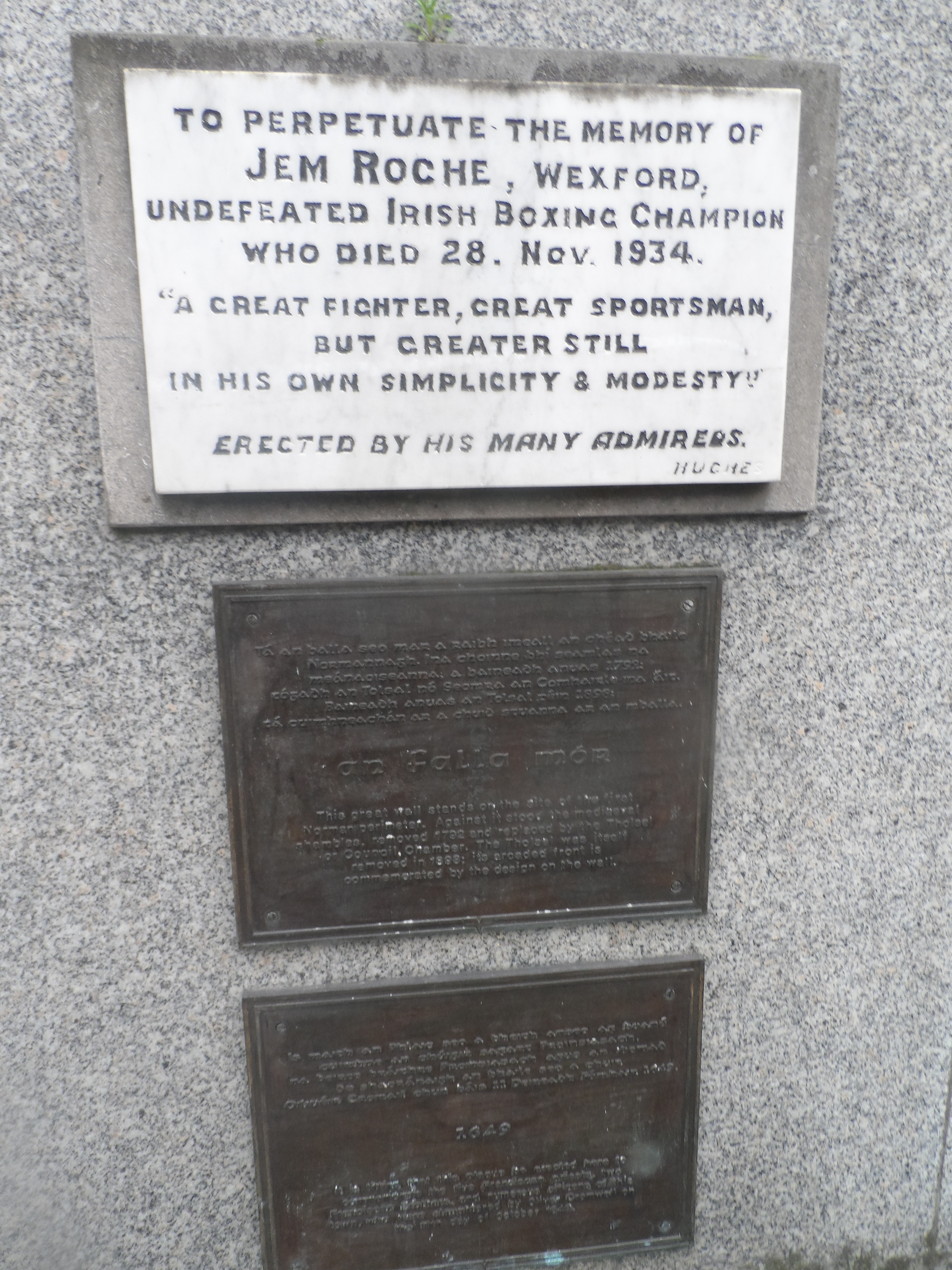
- Memorial plaque, Wexford

Personal information
- Nicknames: Jem, the Bull
- Nationality: Irish
- Born: James Roche; 5 September 1878 Ballinclay, County Wexford, Ireland
- Died: 28 November 1934 (age 56) Wexford, Irish Free State
- Height: 5 ft 7 1/3 in (171 cm)
- Weight: Middleweight; Heavyweight

Boxing career
- Stance: Orthodox

Boxing record
- Total fights: 24
- Wins: 18
- Win by KO: 10
- Losses: 6

James "Jem" Roche (/dʒɛm ˈroʊtʃ/; 5 September 1878 – 28 November 1934) was an Irish boxer and Gaelic football coach.

== Early life ==
Roche was born in Ballinclay near to Killurin, County Wexford in 1878. The family later moved to Wexford town, and Jem attended Wexford CBS and worked for a time as a blacksmith at Carton's forge in Ballycarney.

== Sporting career ==
=== Boxing ===
His first amateur fight took place in 1894 in the Town Hall (now Wexford Arts Centre). Roche, aged 16, knocked out his opponent, a soldier named Billy Murphy. The referee, Nicholas T. Tennant, later became Roche's coach.

In 1900, aged 22, he won his first national title when he knocked out Jack Fitzpatrick in the Antient Concert Rooms (later the Academy Cinema on Pearse Street, Dublin) to become Irish middleweight champion. He retained that title for five years before losing to Young John L. Sullivan in 1905 in the Earlsfort Terrace Rink, Dublin. Roche defeated Sullivan in 1905 and retained the title in 1906 and 1907.

In October 1907 Roche scored a major victory, knocking out Charlie Wilson (former British heavyweight champion) in the Olympia Theatre, Dublin, which set him up for a title shot. On St. Patrick's Day 1908, Roche fought Tommy Burns for the world heavyweight title at the Theatre Royal, Dublin, with a purse of £1,500 (split 80:20). He was knocked out after 88 seconds. This is sometimes described as the shortest world heavyweight fight at the time, but Burns had beaten Bill Squires in the same time the previous July, and James J. Jeffries had won a 1900 title fight in 55 seconds.

Roche lost his Irish heavyweight title in 1910 to Matthew 'Nutty' Curran; he regained the title in 1913 when he again beat John L. Sullivan. He retired from boxing in that year.

=== Gaelic football ===
Roche played for the Young Irelands club, based in Selskar. He was appointed trainer of the Wexford senior football team and they went on win six consecutive Leinster Senior Football Championships (1913–18) and four consecutive All-Ireland Senior Football Championships (1915–18).

== Personal life ==
Roche married Bridget Furlong in 1908 and they lived in Wexford and had five children: their sons Pierce and Seamus also had careers in boxing.

Roche worked as a publican, bookmaker and commission agent's manager; he died in 1934, aged fifty-six.

His grand nephew Dick Roche (born 1947) became a TD and cabinet minister. His grandson Billy Roche (born 1949) is a playwright.

A plaque in his memory was erected in Wexford's "Bull Ring" in 1961.
