= Marvin Hart =

American boxer (1876–1931)

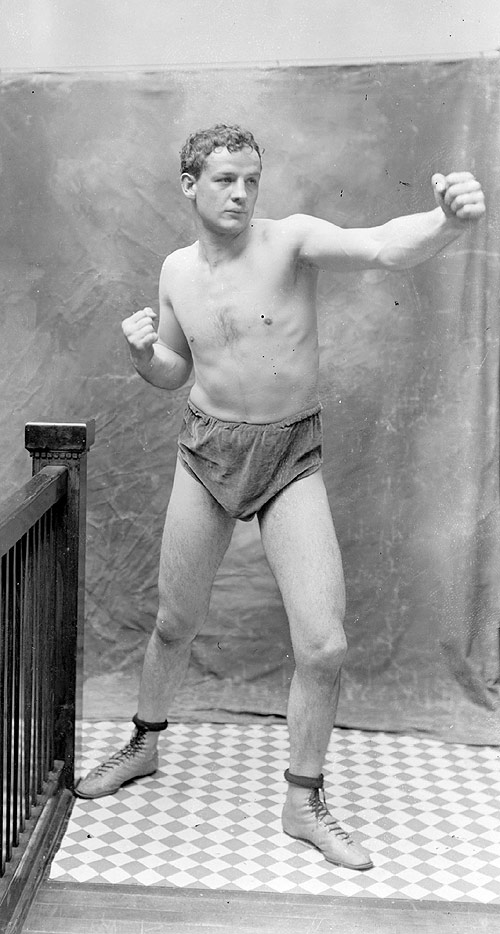
- Marvin Hart in 1902, photo from the Chicago Daily News

Personal information
- Nickname: The Louisville Plumber The Fightin' Kentuckian
- Born: September 16, 1876 Louisville, Kentucky, US
- Died: September 17, 1931 (aged 55) Fern Creek, Kentucky, US
- Height: 5 ft 11 1/2 in (1.82 m)
- Weight: Heavyweight

Boxing career
- Reach: 74 in (188 cm)
- Stance: Orthodox

Boxing record
- Total fights: 39
- Wins: 28
- Losses: 7
- Draws: 4

Marvin Hart (September 16, 1876 – September 17, 1931) was the World Heavyweight Boxing Champion from July 3, 1905, to February 23, 1906.

== Boxing career ==
Hart, nicknamed "the Louisville Plumber" because of his former trade, gained considerable prominence after a 1905 win over future champion Jack Johnson. That year, the heavyweight title was left vacant as a result of the retirement of champion James J. Jeffries and Hart's record earned him a chance to fight for the championship against top-ranked Jack Root (1876–1963), a much more experienced boxer, who had already beaten Hart in November, 1902.

Jeffries, the retiring champ, refereed the championship fight on July 3, 1905, in Reno, Nevada. Hart knocked out Jack Root in the 12th round to win the vacant championship. After one successful exhibition match, Hart lost his championship to Canadian Tommy Burns on February 23, 1906, in Los Angeles. Burns won the 20-round fight by decision.

== Death ==
Hart died the day after his 55th birthday of an enlarged liver and high blood pressure. He was interred in the Resthaven Memorial Park, in his hometown of Louisville, Kentucky.

== Professional boxing record ==
39 fights	28 wins	7 losses
By knockout	20	4
By decision	3	3
By disqualification	5	0
Draws	4	

No.	Result	Record	Opponent	Type	Round, time	Date	Location	Notes
39	Loss	28–7–4	Carl Morris	RTD	3 (12)	Dec 20, 1910	Sapulpa Air Dome, Sapulpa, Oklahoma, U.S.	
38	Loss	28–6–4	Mike Schreck	TKO	4 (10)	Jul 26, 1909	Lakeview Theater, Terre Haute, Indiana, U.S.	
37	Win	28–5–4	Tony Ross	DQ	13 (20)	Mar 12, 1909	West Side A.C., Gretna, Louisiana, U.S.	
36	Win	27–5–4	Jack Twin Sullivan	DQ	5 (12)	Oct 20, 1908	Armory, Boston, Massachusetts, U.S.	
35	Draw	26–5–4	Hugh McGann	PTS	20	Oct 9, 1908	Opera House, Lexington, Kentucky, U.S.	
34	Win	26–5–3	John Willie	DQ	4 (20)	Mar 17, 1908	Hot Springs, Arkansas, U.S.	
33	Loss	25–5–3	Mike Schreck	TKO	21 (?)	May 30, 1907	Tonopah, Nevada, U.S.	
32	Win	25–4–3	Peter Maher	KO	2 (20)	Apr 1, 1907	Whittington A.C., Hot Springs, Arkansas, U.S.	
31	Win	24–4–3	Harry Rogers	KO	2 (20)	Mar 15, 1907	Whittington A.C., Hot Springs, Arkansas, U.S.	
30	Loss	23–4–3	Tommy Burns	PTS	20	Feb 23, 1906	Amphitheater, Reno, Nevada, U.S.	Lost world heavyweight title
29	Win	23–3–3	Jack Root	KO	12 (?)	Jul 3, 1905	Amphitheater, Reno, Nevada, U.S.	Won vacant world heavyweight title
28	Win	22–3–3	Jack Johnson	PTS	20	Mar 28, 1905	Woodward's Pavilion, San Francisco, California, U.S.	
27	Draw	21–3–3	Gus Ruhlin	PTS	12	May 20, 1904	Germania Maennerchor Hall, Baltimore, Maryland, U.S.	
26	Win	21–3–2	Sandy Ferguson	PTS	20	Mar 15, 1904	Whittington Park A.C., Hot Springs, Arkansas, U.S.	
25	Draw	20–3–2	John Willie	PTS	6	Jan 15, 1904	Watita Hall, Chicago, Illinois, U.S.	
24	Draw	20–3–1	George Gardner	PTS	15	Jan 15, 1904	Criterion A.C., Boston, Massachusetts, U.S.	
23	Win	20–3	Kid Carter	TKO	15	Dec 1, 1903	Criterion A.C., Boston, Massachusetts, U.S.	
22	Loss	19–3	George Gardner	PTS	12	May 13, 1903	Southern A.C., Louisville, Kentucky, U.S.	
21	Win	19–2	Jack Bonner	DQ	4 (20)	Apr 2, 1903	Louisville, Kentucky, U.S. A.C., Louisville, Kentucky, U.S.	
20	Loss	18–2	Jack Root	PTS	6	Nov 10, 1902	Lyceum A.C., Chicago, Illinois, U.S.	Lost American light-heavyweight title
19	Win	18–1	Billy Stift	PTS	6	Aug 18, 1902	America A.C., Chicago, Illinois, U.S.	
18	Win	17–1	Kid Carter	KO	9 (20)	May 3, 1902	Southern A.C., Louisville, Kentucky, U.S.	Won American light-heavyweight title
17	Win	16–1	Dick O'Brien	KO	3 (20)	Apr 7, 1902	Empire A.C., Louisville, Kentucky, U.S.	
16	Win	15–1	Billy Stift	KO	3 (20)	Jan 20, 1902	Music Hall, Louisville, Kentucky, U.S.	
15	Loss	14–1	Wild Bill Hanrahan	KO	1 (25)	Dec 17, 1901	Auditorium, Louisville, Kentucky, U.S.	
14	Win	14–0	Jack Beauscholte	KO	10 (20)	Nov 1, 1901	Music Hall, Louisville, Kentucky, U.S.	
13	Win	13–0	Dan Creedon	KO	6 (20)	May 24, 1901	Southern A.C., Louisville, Kentucky, U.S.	
12	Win	12–0	Tommy West	TKO	16 (20)	Mar 29, 1901	Southern A.C., Louisville, Kentucky, U.S.	
11	Win	11–0	Australian Jim Ryan	KO	8 (20)	Feb 25, 1901	Louisville, Kentucky, U.S.	
10	Win	10–0	Al Weining	KO	11 (20)	Jan 21, 1901	Music Hall, Louisville, Kentucky, U.S.	
9	Win	9–0	Peter Trainer	KO	17 (20)	Dec 12, 1900	Music Hall, Louisville, Kentucky, U.S.	
8	Win	8–0	Hugh McGann	KO	6 (20)	Aug 18, 1900	Music Hall, Louisville, Kentucky, U.S.	
7	Win	7–0	Hugh McGann	DQ	6 (20)	Aug 13, 1900	Nonpareil A.C., Louisville, Kentucky, U.S.	
6	Win	6–0	Harry Rogers	KO	14 (20)	Jun 26, 1900	Music Hall, Louisville, Kentucky, U.S.	
5	Win	5–0	Louis Seifker	KO	2 (20)	Jun 12, 1900	Music Hall, Louisville, Kentucky, U.S.	
4	Win	4–0	Tommy Williams	KO	2 (20)	May 10, 1900	Music Hall, Louisville, Kentucky, U.S.	
3	Win	3–0	Charles Meisner	KO	1 (20)	Apr 2, 1900	Music Hall, Louisville, Kentucky, U.S.	
2	Win	2–0	William Schiller	KO	4 (?)	Feb 12, 1900	Louisville, Kentucky, U.S.	
1	Win	1–0	William Schiller	KO	7 (?)	Dec 12, 1899	Louisville, Kentucky, U.S.	

== See also ==
- List of heavyweight boxing champions

Awards and achievements
Preceded by James J. Jeffries; Retired	World Heavyweight Champion; July 3, 1905 – February 23, 1906	Succeeded by Tommy Burns
