= Thomas Thomas (boxer) =

Welsh boxer

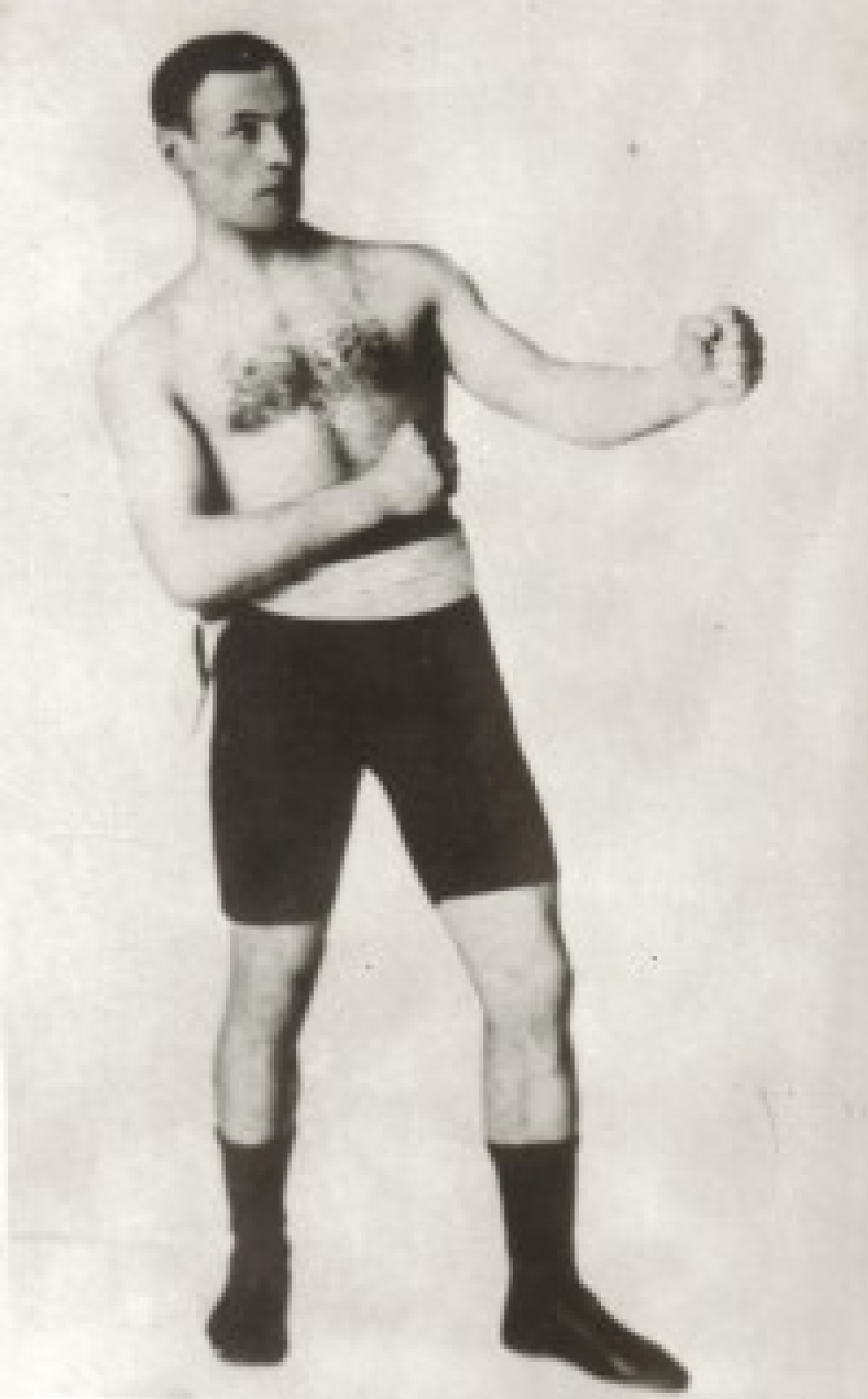

Personal information
- Nickname: Tom Farmer
- Nationality: Welsh
- Born: Thomas John Thomas; 8 April 1880 Glynarthen, Wales
- Died: 13 August 1911 (aged 31) Cardiff, Wales
- Height: 5 ft 7 in (170 cm)
- Weight: middleweight

Boxing career

Boxing record
- Total fights: 36
- Wins: 32
- Win by KO: 28
- Losses: 3
- Draws: 0

Thomas Thomas (8 April 1880 – 13 August 1911) was a Welsh boxer and the first British middleweight boxing champion.

== Early years ==
He was born at Glynarthen, Cardiganshire but moved to Carncelyn Farm, Penygraig, in the Rhondda Valley of South Wales at an early age.

== Boxing history ==
Born at Glynarthen, Cardiganshire (the home of his mother) and then moving to Carnelyn Farm, he began boxing in a sideshow, touring with Freddie Welsh and Jim Driscoll. After winning the local Rhondda valley heavyweight "championship", he won a National Sporting Club middleweight competition in London. Eventually, in May 1906, he fought the English champion Pat O'Keeffe to become the first national British middleweight champion. In 1909, he fought Charlie Wilson to become the first holder of a Lonsdale Belt at his weight. He won over thirty fights before losing the British middleweight title to Jim Sullivan in November 1910.

== Early demise ==
He began to suffer from rheumatism. He died from heart failure in August 1911 in Cardiff.

Although his boxing record is not very well documented he is believed to have won 41 of his 44 fights.

== Sources ==
- Welsh Biography Online
- "Sport" edited by Gareth Williams. Published by Parthian Books (2007)
