= Arthur Frederick Bettinson =

Manager and promoter of the National Sporting Club (1862–1926)

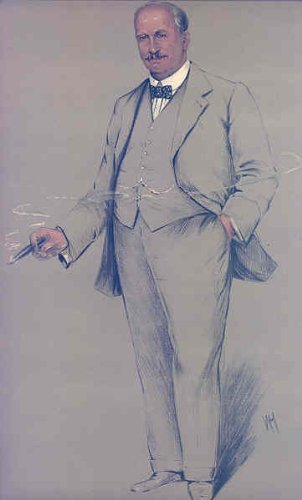
- Vanity Fair caricature, 22 November 1911
- Born: 10 March 1862; Marylebone, London, England
- Died: 24 December 1926 (aged 64); Hampstead, London, England
- Burial place: Highgate Cemetery (East); 51.5656°N 0.1446°W
- Occupations: Manager, promoter, referee and author
- Organisation: National Sporting Club
- Spouses: Florence Olivia Cecilia Mallet (m:1890–1919); Harriett Flint (m:1919–1926)
- Children: 3
- Honours: International Boxing Hall of Fame inductee (2011)

Arthur Frederick "Peggy" Bettinson (10 March 1862 – 24 December 1926) was an English boxing promoter, referee and author. A former amateur boxer, he won the Amateur Boxing Association lightweight title in 1882. In 1891 he co-founded the National Sporting Club (NSC), which became central to the regulation and promotion of professional boxing in Britain. As manager of the club for nearly three decades, Bettinson oversaw its operations during a period when boxing's legal status was contested, appearing as a defendant or witness in multiple court proceedings arising from fatalities in the ring.

Guy Deghy, author of a 1956 history of the club, characterised Bettinson as an "autocratic" manager who exercised personal control over the NSC's conduct, while John Harding described him as "one of the most powerful men in British boxing since the turn of the century". Bettinson played a central role in the introduction of the Lonsdale Belt and standardised weight divisions for British championship boxing in 1909. In his later years he resisted the shift towards commercial promotion, and his death in 1926 preceded the club's decline as a regulatory force. He was inducted into the International Boxing Hall of Fame in 2011.

== Early life ==
Bettinson was born on 10 March 1862 into a large family in Marylebone. His father, John George Bettinson, was a general labourer, builder and joiner. Bettinson spent his teenage years completing an apprenticeship in upholstery. He was given the nickname "Peggy" in childhood; he later explained that his mother, trying to break him of left-handedness, had told him "You're not a boy; you must be girl to eat your food like that. We shall have to call you Peggy." His elder brothers carried the name to school, where it stuck for life.

As a young man Bettinson excelled in a variety of sports; he was an accomplished rugby player and cricketer. He swam at the Annual 100-yard Amateur Championships held at the Lambeth Baths, finishing second in 1883.

Boxing became his principal sporting pursuit. In 1881 he reached the semi-finals of the inaugural Amateur Boxing Association championships as a middleweight, representing the German Gymnastic Society. He was defeated by the eventual champion, William Brown of Birmingham. The following year he competed as a lightweight and won the title, defeating V. Shillcock in the final. Bettinson continued to appear in amateur exhibition bouts into the mid-1880s.

Before co-founding the NSC, Bettinson served on the boxing committee of the Pelican Club, which was chaired by Hugh Lowther, 5th Earl of Lonsdale. Deghy records that the two men took "the first steps towards cleaning up the boxing profession" together, establishing a working relationship that would continue at the NSC. In practice, Lonsdale provided aristocratic patronage and symbolic authority while Bettinson managed the club's daily operations as a salaried employee. Bettinson learned what Deghy called the "subtle art of match-making" from the Pelican Club's Ernest Wells and from John Fleming, and proved able not only to select contests but to manage and run a club, a combination his predecessors had lacked.

== Founding the National Sporting Club ==
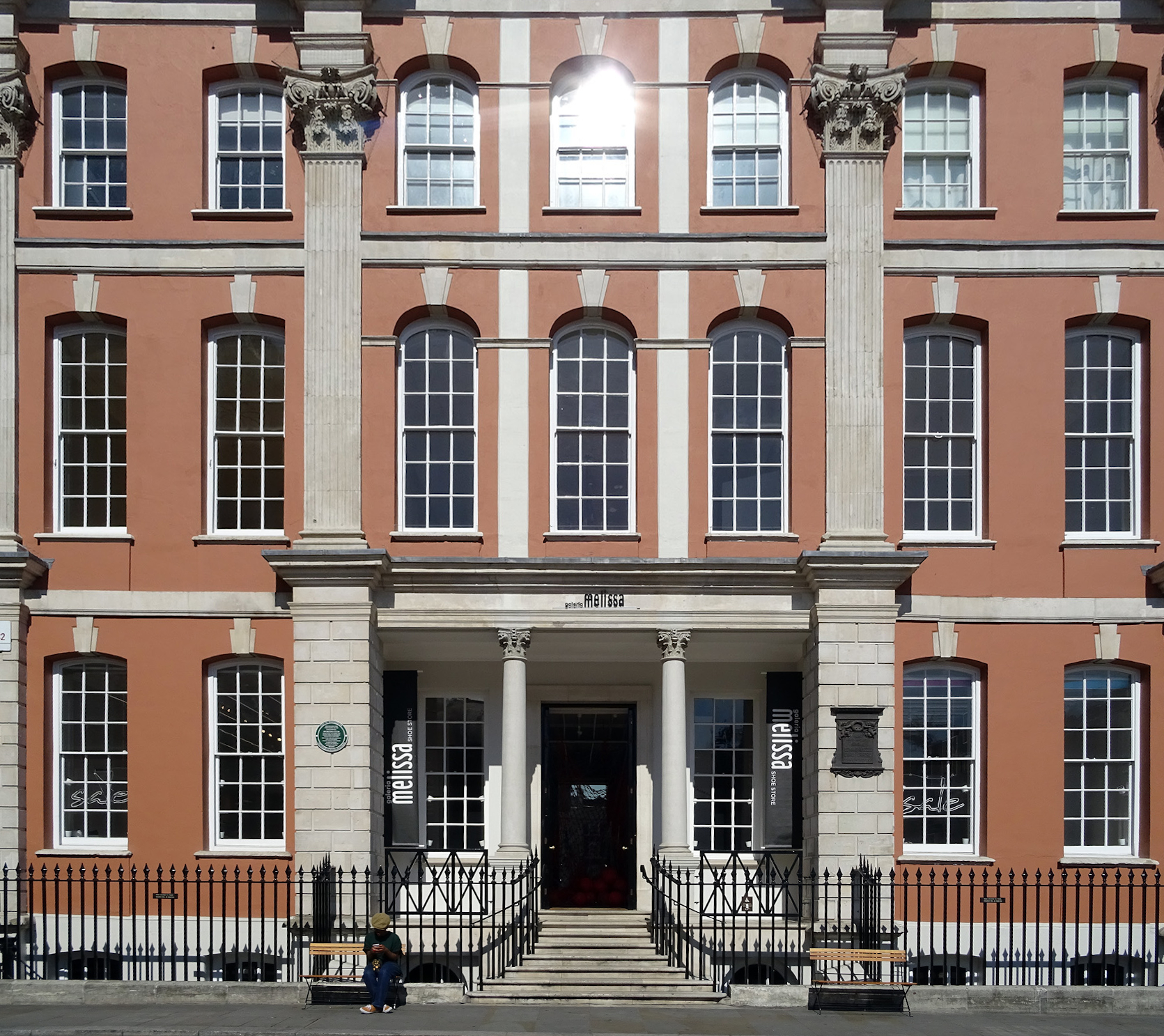
The original National Sporting Club building at 43 King Street, Covent Garden

Deghy records that the plan for the NSC took shape during a train journey from Sunbury to Waterloo, where, in the account taken from the chronicler J. B. Booth, Bettinson entered the compartment in which Fleming was sitting; Fleming proposed a club devoted more entirely to boxing than the Pelican had been, offered him a share in the management, and the club was founded before the train reached Waterloo. The pair secured premises at 43 King Street, Covent Garden, formerly home to the Falstaff Club. Bettinson recruited the founding members, including most of the prominent bookmakers in London. Lord Lonsdale served as the club's president. The National Sporting Club opened on 5 March 1891.

Despite its growing reputation, the club's start was financially precarious. Bettinson provided most of the capital that had underwritten the new venture. The premises were equipped and furnished on the hire-purchase system, with monthly instalments running well in excess of the expected returns; within a few months of opening the club was on the verge of bankruptcy, and its first years brought repeated appeals to the generosity of the members.

Fleming died on the club's premises on 15 November 1897. After his death, Bettinson became the sole central figure in the club's management, a position he held for nearly three decades.

== Management style ==
Bettinson exercised personal control over the club's conduct. Silence during the rounds had been imposed by Fleming, who forbade all conversation during contests, and Deghy records that Bettinson affected the same curt manner as his partner.

Deghy described Bettinson's management style as "autocratic" and "curt". Together with Fleming, he established what Deghy characterised as a regime of "enlightened absolutism" at Covent Garden, in which a previously unruly sport was governed with rigid discipline. Bettinson's own account was more measured; writing in 1902, he described himself as "a man of tact and management". His co-author Ben Bennison later remembered "a hard, unbending man of business".

Unlike the gentlemen members who gave their time voluntarily, Bettinson was a salaried employee of the NSC, drawing a wage for his management of the club. Staff at Covent Garden called him the "Old Guv'nor" and remembered him as considerate and generous. Deghy's portrait is of a stubborn, opinionated and dictatorial man who could nevertheless be pleasant and ironic when it suited him, and whose self-protective aloofness kept the boxers he managed at a distance even when he tried to be kind; in old age, Deghy wrote, he was irascible at the best of times.

Bettinson placed considerable emphasis on the authority and integrity of the referee. Deghy wrote that within a decade of its foundation the club had "established a tradition of fairness" that the Pelicans had never achieved, and its rules gave the referee the right to stop a contest if a boxer "was physically unfit to go on fighting", a provision Deghy describes as made in the interests of "fairness and humanity". Testimony at the 1901 manslaughter trial, reproduced in the club's 1902 account, described the ten-second count as a humane rule and confirmed that a referee had power outside the written rules to end an uneven match. At the sport's grass roots, Harding describes music hall matinee shows staged by promoters with little knowledge of boxing, where mismatches were common and contests were often "farcical".

Mounting pressure from magistrates and police authorities, together with concerns about mismatches, exploitative contracts and disorder in small-hall promotions, reinforced Bettinson's belief that restricting British championship contests to the club was both prudent and necessary.

== Boxing on trial ==
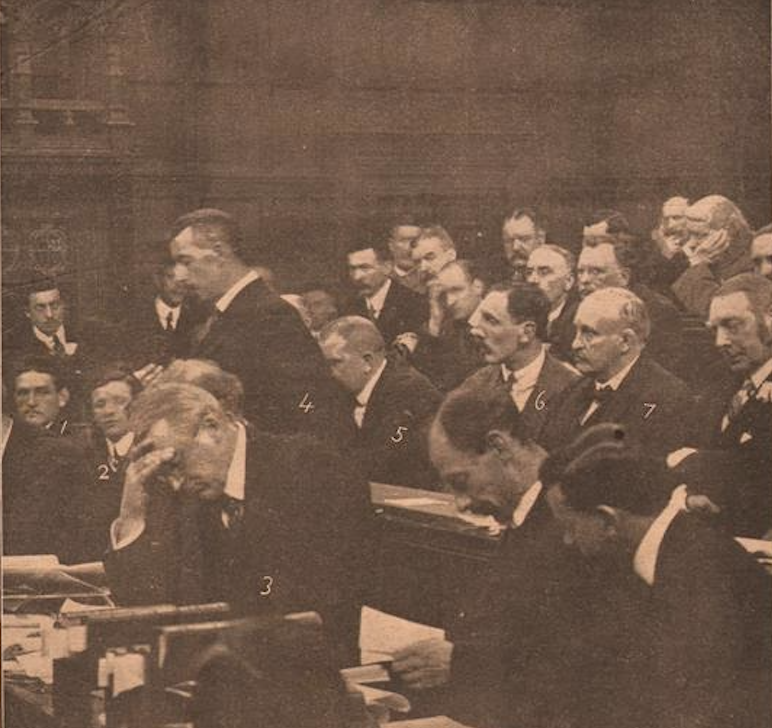
Members of the National Sporting Club in court. Bettinson (background, centre) is seated next to Lord Lonsdale (far right), 1911.

Between 1897 and 1901, four boxers died following bouts at the NSC: Walter Croot (1897), Tom Turner (1898), Mike Riley (1900) and Billy Smith (1901). Bettinson was arrested or charged with manslaughter on each occasion, and gave evidence in the resulting proceedings, defending the club's rules and precautions; all of the cases were dismissed or ended in acquittal. The Turner case reached the Old Bailey in November 1898, the grand jury threw out the bill in the Riley case in March 1900, and the trial arising from Smith's death, in which Bettinson was among ten defendants alongside the referee Eugene Corri, ended in acquittal in June 1901. Bettinson attributed the public outcry following Croot's death to critics who had not been present, writing that such people were "never happy unless they are hysterical". In the final case, concerning Billy Smith, the prosecution departed from the approach taken in earlier proceedings and laid blame on the sport itself; Bettinson faced sustained questioning aimed at discrediting the NSC's rules. Bettinson later claimed that the acquittal in Rex v. Roberts and Others had established the legality of boxing, though he acknowledged that the sport's legal position remained ambiguous and that participants could still face prosecution in the event of a fatality. Horrall states that the final acquittal, in 1901, legalised boxing in Britain, and Graeme Kent describes it as a significant victory for the club which encouraged other promoters to stage contests.

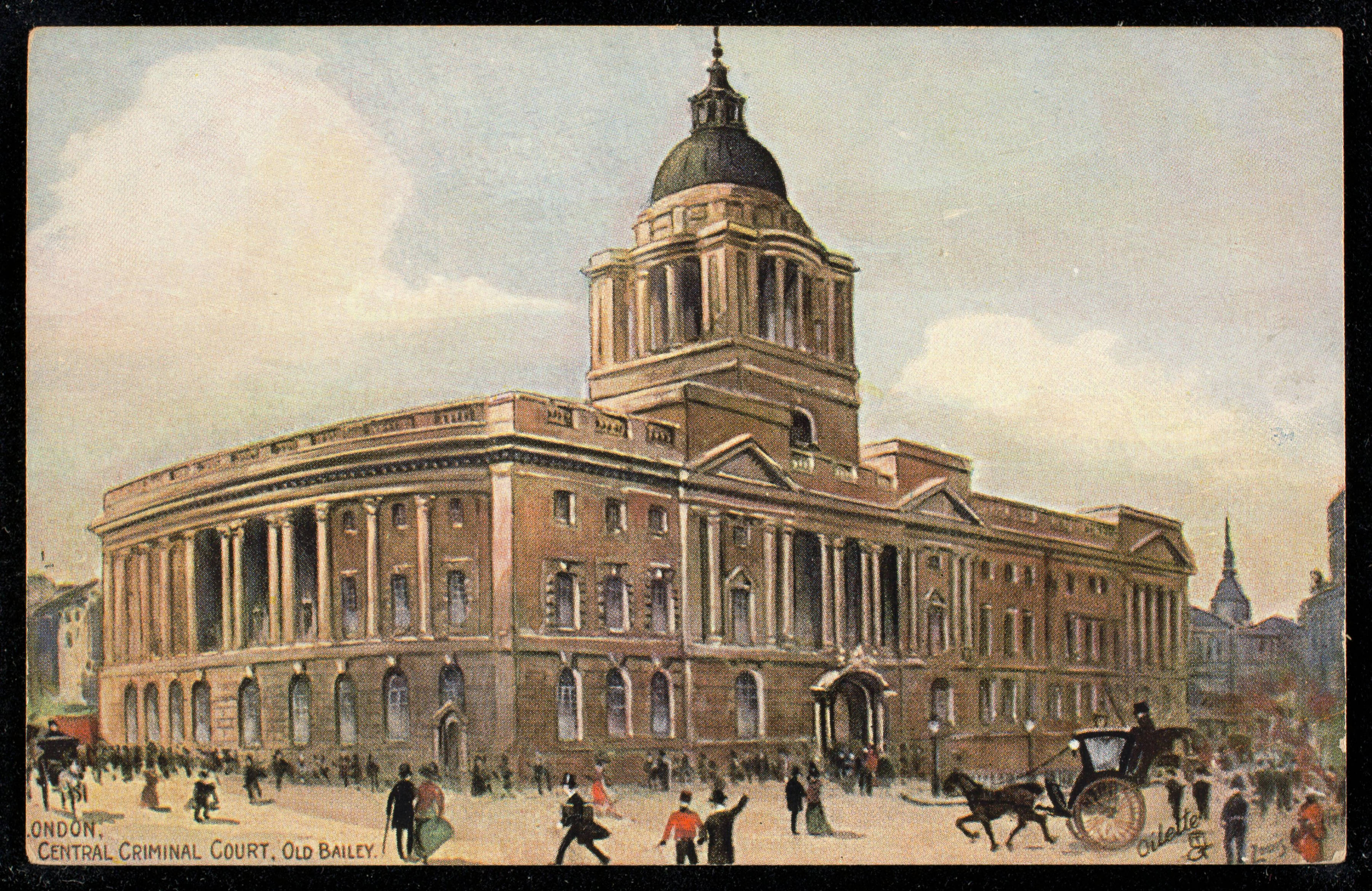
London, Central Criminal Court, Old Bailey, c. 1900

In December 1911 Jim Driscoll and Owen Moran were due to meet in Birmingham in a contest billed as being for the world featherweight title, but before the bout took place both boxers and the promoter were summoned to court, accused of arranging a prize fight. Bettinson and Lord Lonsdale travelled to Birmingham to give evidence in defence of boxing. Bettinson testified that under the NSC's points system, a man leading on points who was knocked out could still win the contest. The judge ruled the bout a prize fight and outlawed it; the ruling was overturned on appeal in 1913.

== The Lonsdale Belt ==
In 1909 Bettinson and the NSC committee discussed the introduction of additional weight divisions and championship belts for British boxing. In an interview with Sporting Life, Bettinson argued that standardised weight limits were necessary due to the growing number of active boxers and suggested that champions should be required to defend their titles within set time limits.

The resulting championship belts were commissioned from London jewellers Mappin & Webb . Lord Lonsdale paid for the first, ordered in the summer of 1909 and offered as the prize for the lightweight championship of England. Bettinson published the rules governing their ownership in Sporting Life in December 1909. A champion was required to defend the belt within six months of a challenge. Outright ownership was granted to a boxer who won three championship contests under NSC auspices, consecutive or not, or who remained undisputed champion for three consecutive years. Outright winners were also entitled to a pension of £1 a week from the NSC upon reaching the age of fifty.

== Record as referee ==
Bettinson occasionally acted as a referee at professional contests. His recorded bouts as referee span more than three decades, from the Pelican Club in 1890 to British title contests at the NSC in his sixties. Among the most notable was the contest between Freddie Welsh and Jim Driscoll in Cardiff on 20 December 1910. Bettinson later wrote that, conscious of the "local feeling", he spoke "long and earnestly" to both fighters before the bout, insisting that "all should be fair and aboveboard" and warning that any man who transgressed the rules would be disqualified. Driscoll was disqualified in the tenth round for butting.

Bettinson referee record
Date	Bout	Venue	Notes
1 April 1890	Fred Johnson v Bill Baxter	Pelican Club, London	
27 February 1891	Arthur Wilkinson v Morgan Crowther	Kennington, London	Bout halted by police
6 March 1896	C. Cook v Jem Sharpe	School of Arms, London	
20 December 1910	Jim Driscoll v Freddie Welsh	American Skating Rink, Cardiff	Driscoll disqualified
27 December 1913	Bill Beynon v Charles Ledoux	American Skating Rink, Cardiff	EBU Bantamweight Title
30 September 1916	Louis Ruddick v Joe Symonds	Swansea	British flyweight eliminator
30 September 1916	Ivor Day v Idris Jones	Swansea	
20 December 1917	Harry Ashdown v Jerry Shea	Cardiff	
31 October 1921	Mike Honeyman v Joe Fox	NSC, London	British featherweight title
26 February 1923	Tommy Harrison v Harry Lake	NSC, London	British bantamweight title

== Promoter ==
=== Boxing ===
As promoter and manager, Bettinson arranged bouts, advised financial backers and supervised training arrangements for boxers associated with the NSC. He acted as an intermediary between fighters and wealthy patrons, providing assessments of boxers' abilities and organising suitable opponents.

One of Bettinson's most notable charges was Tom "Pedlar" Palmer, billed as the world bantamweight champion. In 1899 Bettinson accompanied Palmer to New York City to defend his title against Terry McGovern. Bettinson was dismissive of McGovern before the fight, telling the press: "With all due respect, McGovern is just a slugger ... Palmer will hold on to his title for a fifth time and you can bank on it." Palmer lost the title by knockout in the opening round.

=== Wrestling ===
Under the authority of the NSC committee, Bettinson sought to revive professional wrestling in Britain by organising catch-as-catch-can wrestling tournaments. These events were staged between 1908 and 1910 at venues such as the Alhambra Theatre and were promoted as world championships. Championship cups, supplied by Lord Lonsdale and valued at £300 each, were awarded to the winners at each weight.

== First World War ==
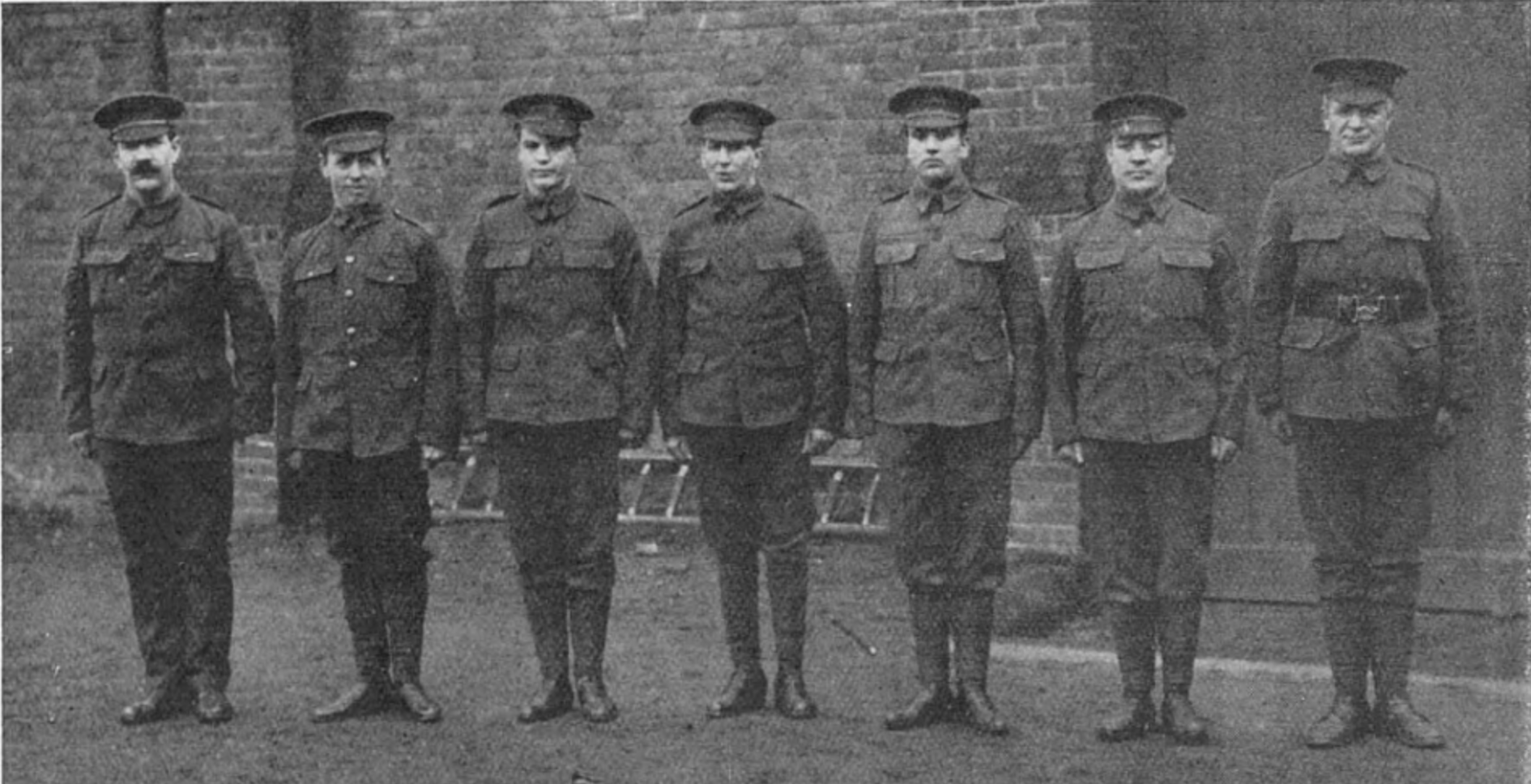
Boxers who joined the Colours. From left to right: Sgt. Taylor, Dick Burge, Dai Roberts, Duke Lynch, W.W. Turner, Jack Goldswain and LCpl Pat O'Keeffe

During the First World War, Bettinson organised inter-service boxing tournaments between units of the British Army and the Royal Navy as a means of physical training, discipline and morale-building. Many professional boxers associated with the NSC served either in combat roles or as physical training instructors.

The war years strengthened the club's control over championship boxing. With the collapse of competing promotions, champions were effectively compelled to defend their titles at Covent Garden.

== Views on boxing governance ==
Bettinson was cautious about broader regulatory ambitions. While Lonsdale was enthusiastic about international control, promising to "do his utmost to further the idea", Bettinson predicted "a conflict between boxing promoters and a governing board" and expressed scepticism about whether countries with differing boxing traditions would agree on common governance. He believed the NSC was already "looked up to as a law-maker by all other professional boxing enterprises" in Britain, and drew a distinction between the club's focus on "sport, not the money" and American boxing, which he considered commercially driven.

Following the First World War, professional boxing increasingly moved from private clubs to large public venues such as the Royal Albert Hall and Olympia. Bettinson remained committed to the NSC's private club model, preferring its controlled environment to the higher revenues generated by mass-spectator arenas. He was hostile to commercial promoters, singling out Charles B. Cochran as a threat to the sport's integrity because of the large purses Cochran offered. Bettinson lamented that Joe Beckett, having beaten Bombardier Wells, regarded a Lonsdale Belt as "beneath his dignity" and preferred the larger rewards available from commercial promotions.

Bettinson was openly critical of the financial demands of leading fighters and their managers, whom he accused of holding "the promoter up at the point of the pistol". He cited the case of Jack Britton, whose terms for a contest against Ted "Kid" Lewis would have cost the club approximately £16,000, and Johnny Kilbane, who demanded $60,000 for a featherweight title defence, sums he considered impossible for a membership-funded institution.

== Personal life and death ==
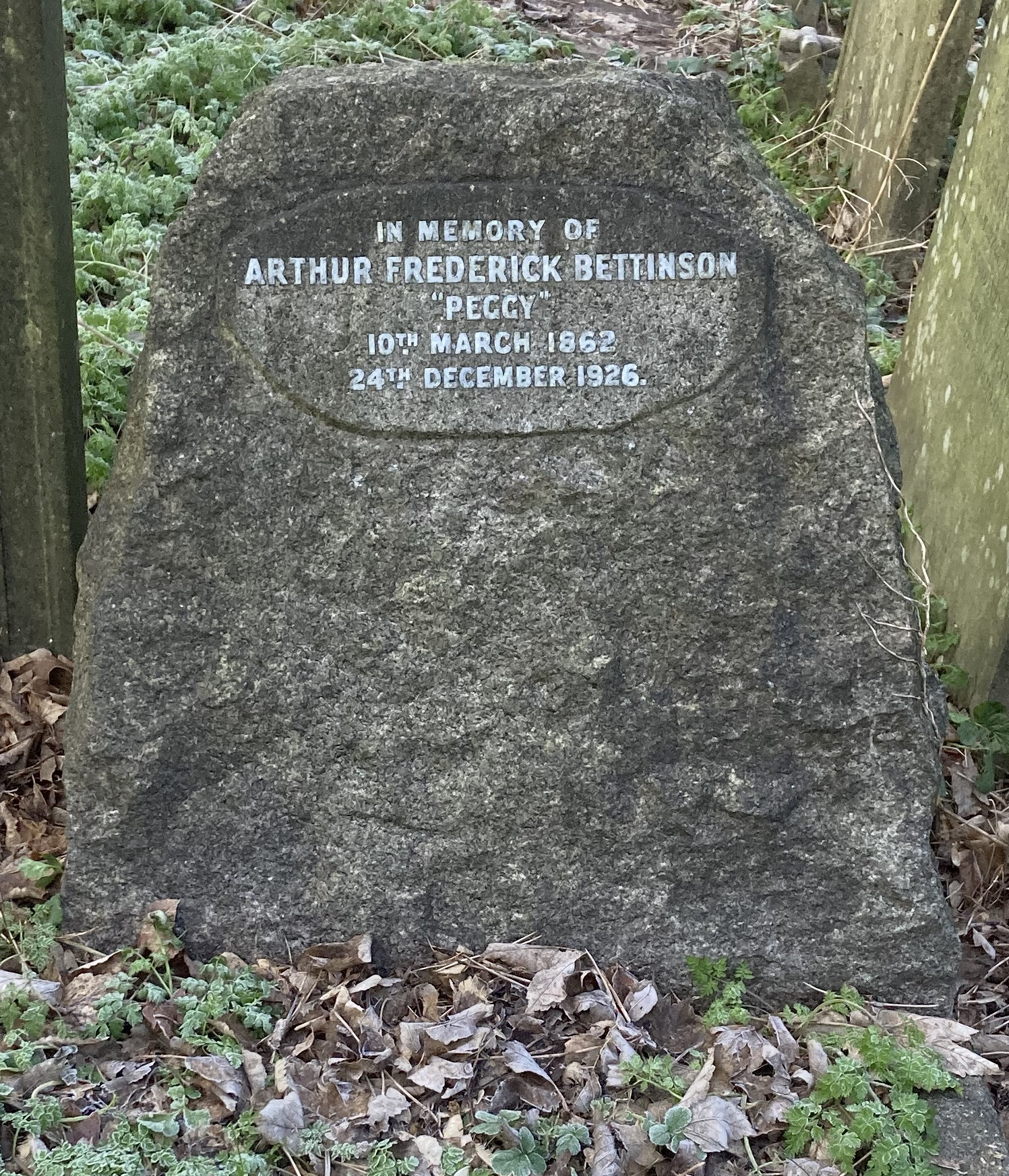
Grave of Arthur Frederick Bettinson in Highgate Cemetery

Bettinson married Florence Olivia Cecilia Mallet on 10 August 1890 at St Mary's, Sunbury-on-Thames. They had two sons: Gerald Arthur (born 1891) and Lionel Frederick (born 1892). (Note: By 1911, Bettinson and Florence were living apart. The 1911 census records Bettinson at 59 Clifton Hill, St Johns Wood, with Lionel and a third son, Ralph Gilbert Bettinson (born 1908), while Florence was living separately.) Florence Bettinson died in 1919. Later that year, Bettinson married Harriett Flint. His youngest son, Ralph Gilbert, had been born in 1908. In later life he suffered from gout.

Bettinson died at his residence in Fairfax Road, Hampstead, on 24 December 1926, aged 64. He had suffered a stroke in his final years and his memory had become "somewhat defective". Deghy records that Bettinson was offered a sea voyage on a cargo boat by Harry Isaacs, brother of the Marquess of Reading. He became seriously ill after the boat left Genoa and was diagnosed with angina pectoris at Leghorn, where he spent a month in hospital. After a short convalescence in Florence, he travelled on to Verona, where he suffered a second heart attack. His son Gerald brought him home to Hampstead, where he died a few days later. Contemporary reports stated that he had been in declining health for some years and that he died from pneumonia. He was buried at Highgate Cemetery.

== Legacy ==
Harding describes Bettinson as "one of the most powerful men in British boxing since the turn of the century" and argues that his death in 1926 marked the end of the NSC as a major force. Within two years, the club relinquished its long-standing Covent Garden premises and became a more transient commercial operation under the direction of his son, Lionel.

Deghy characterised the NSC under Bettinson as a "patriarchal kind of totalitarianism" in which boxers "were looked after if they behaved". Not all of Bettinson's commitments survived his death. The Lonsdale Belts had included a pension for outright winners, but after the original NSC closed the British Boxing Board of Control informed former belt holders that it was unable to honour the obligation, as the new belts did not carry the same terms. By the time of his death, Bettinson was regarded as resistant to the "advent of a new age" in boxing, and his suspicion of commercial promoters, whom he dismissed as "fly-by-nights" with no legitimate place in the sport, was seen by some contemporaries as an obstacle to the modernisation of professional boxing in Britain.

Bettinson's funeral was attended by leading figures from British boxing, including Pedlar Palmer, Jimmy Wilde, Joe Beckett and Joe Bowker. Among the wreaths was one from Val Baker, President of the Amateur Boxing Association, which read: "From an old admirer and disciple of the old champion". In 2011, he was posthumously inducted into the International Boxing Hall of Fame in the Non-Participant category. A Westminster Green Plaque was unveiled at 43 King Street in October 2015, commemorating Bettinson and Fleming as founders of the National Sporting Club.

== Publications ==
- Bettinson, A. F.; Tristram, W. Outram (1902). The National Sporting Club: Past and Present. London: Sands & Co.
- Bettinson, A.F.; Bennison, B. (1922). The Home of Boxing. Odhams Press.
- Bettinson, A. F.; Bennison, B. (1937). Famous Fights and Fighters. World's Work. (Posthumously published).

== In popular culture ==
In the British historical drama series A Thousand Blows (2025), Bettinson is portrayed by actor Ziggy Heath. The series dramatises his role as a manager at the NSC, depicting him as a representative of the regulated "new world" of West End boxing in contrast to the illegal bare-knuckle fighting of the East End. The show retains his historical nickname, "Peggy".

== See also ==
- English boxing
- Prize-fighting
