= National Sporting Club =

London boxing club

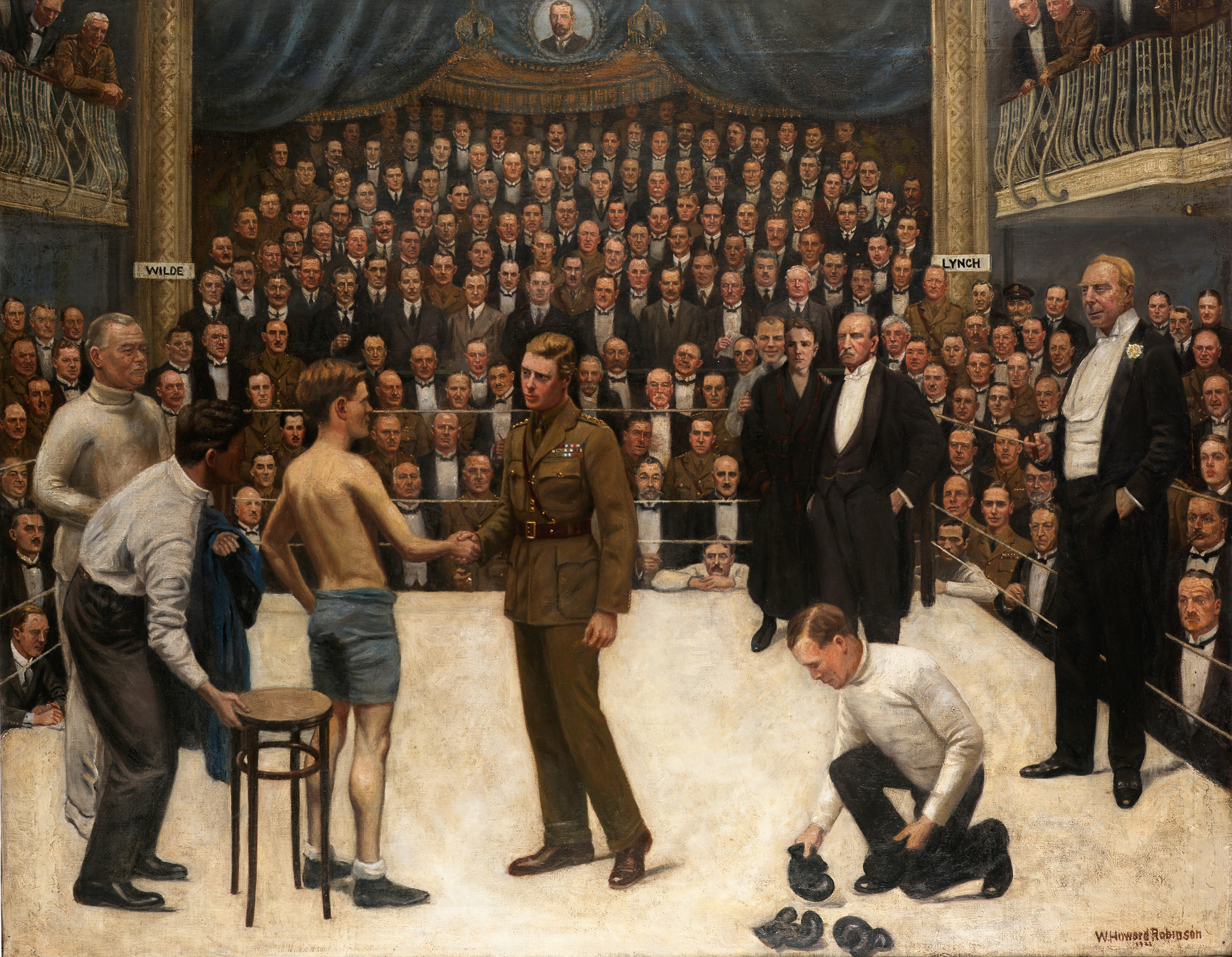
- The Prince of Wales (the future Edward VIII) congratulates Jimmy Wilde at the National Sporting Club, 31 March 1919
- Abbreviation: NSC
- Formation: 5 March 1891
- Founders: John Fleming; Arthur Frederick Bettinson
- Type: Private members' sporting club
- Headquarters: 43 King Street, Covent Garden, London, England
- Coordinates: 51.5121°N 0.1239°W
- Key people: Hugh Lowther, 5th Earl of Lonsdale (president); John Fleming (co-manager until 1897); Arthur Frederick Bettinson (long-serving manager)

The National Sporting Club (NSC) was a private members' sporting club founded in London in 1891 by John Fleming and Arthur Frederick Bettinson. Based at 43 King Street, Covent Garden, it became a leading venue for professional boxing and an unofficial governing body for the sport in Britain. It also hosted fencing, billiards and wrestling, alongside musical and theatrical entertainment.

The club appointed referees, enforced its own rules and required spectators to remain silent during rounds. Four ring deaths between 1897 and 1901 led to manslaughter proceedings against boxers and club officials, but none resulted in a conviction. Historians differ over whether these cases established boxing's legality or left its status uncertain. In 1909, the NSC introduced the Lonsdale Belt to establish a clearer system for recognising national champions.

During the First World War, the club continued to stage contests, including events for service personnel, and supported an ambulance fund. In 1918, it announced a national Board of Control whose membership was largely drawn from the NSC. By the 1920s, black boxers were excluded in practice from British title contests.

The British Boxing Board of Control (BBBofC) was reorganised as an independent governing body in 1929. That year, the NSC left its Covent Garden premises, and the original company entered voluntary liquidation in 1930. In 1936, the Board took exclusive control of championship authorisation and the issuing of Lonsdale Belts. Separate organisations later used the NSC name for boxing promotions and social events, with contests at the Café Royal continuing into the late twentieth century.

== Origins ==
Founded in 1887 by William Goldberg, known as the "Shifter", the Pelican Club began in Denman Street, Piccadilly, where John Fleming became its boxing manager. Its members included aristocrats, and it became known for gambling and disorder. On 3 April 1889, the foundation stone of larger premises in Gerrard Street was laid. The new premises brought complaints from neighbours about late-night noise and crowds. In Bellamy v. Wells (1890), the Chancery Division granted an injunction restricting the nuisance caused by crowds and cabs outside the club. Restrictions on the use of the premises and worsening finances contributed to the Pelican's decline.

Fleming and Arthur Frederick Bettinson then planned a new club. According to Guy Deghy's history of the club, they discussed the venture during a train journey from Sunbury to Waterloo. Fleming proposed a club devoted more closely to boxing than the Pelican, and Bettinson agreed to provide the money needed to launch it. They secured premises at 43 King Street, Covent Garden, previously occupied by the Falstaff Club and the New Club. The National Sporting Club (NSC) opened on 5 March 1891.

Bettinson personally recruited the founding members, who reportedly included every prominent bookmaker in London. Hugh Lowther, 5th Earl of Lonsdale, accepted the presidency but initially took little part in the club's social activities. Deghy described the NSC as a middle-class sporting club, contrasting it with the bohemian Pelican.

The founders bought the furniture and equipment on hire purchase. Deghy considered the NSC probably the only important club to have furnished its premises in this way; on opening night, the fittings still belonged to the supplier. The monthly instalments exceeded the expected income, and within a few months the club was close to bankruptcy. Charles Blacklock, a founding member, gave a few hundred pounds to help, but appeals to members for financial support continued throughout the early years.

By early 1892, the Pelican had closed. Reporting its closure on 8 January, the Bridport News noted that many leading members had left. It praised the NSC for avoiding the older club's mistakes and excluding an "objectionable element" from its membership.

Fleming was found dead in a lavatory at the club on 15 November 1897. The club's 1902 history recorded that he had been unwell for some time and that a collection of fairy stories was found beside him. Bettinson then took over the club's management.

== Premises ==
The NSC occupied 43 King Street, Covent Garden, a house built in 1716–1717 for Edward Russell, 1st Earl of Orford. Its design is attributed on stylistic grounds to the Baroque architect Thomas Archer or another architect working in a similar style. The building is now Grade II* listed.

The club's 1902 history records that the house was known as "The Star" from 1800 to 1805 because of the men of rank who frequented it. It later housed Evans's Hotel and Supper Rooms, where music accompanied late-night meals. The hotel closed around 1880. The Falstaff Club occupied the premises around 1882–1883, followed by the New Club from about 1884 until 1890. Both held dances and entertainments, and the New Club attracted a wealthy, aristocratic membership.

The NSC opened there on 5 March 1891. Its 1902 history described the opening-night gathering as "Corinthian London" and recorded that members and guests inspected the rooms before the boxing began. (Note: "Corinthian" was a term adopted by wealthy young men about town in the early nineteenth century.) The house contained dining rooms, bars and other social rooms. Boxing took place in the former music hall at the rear, built in 1855 to a design by W. Finch Hill and enlarged and remodelled in 1871. It had a gallery and a high ceiling with curved sides and panels containing metal grilles. Known within the club as the "theatre", it was praised in the 1902 history for its "unequalled view of the ring, obtainable from all parts of the house".

Among the interior features was a carved staircase which Deghy described as having come from HMS Britannia, Orford's flagship. An upstairs room called "Old London" retained decorations from the Falstaff Club, including coloured signboards and scenes of earlier country life. H. F. Joel and Co. installed electric lighting for the club. By 1922, the names of Lonsdale Belt holders were inscribed in gold lettering in the vestibule.

The club purchased the freehold of the King Street premises in the summer of 1922. By then, it had also acquired the Holland Park Rink in west London as an annexe where larger audiences could attend international and world championship contests. Bettinson and B. Bennison explained that, despite alterations to increase accommodation at King Street, some major contests could not be staged there without substantial financial losses.

== Rules and organisation ==
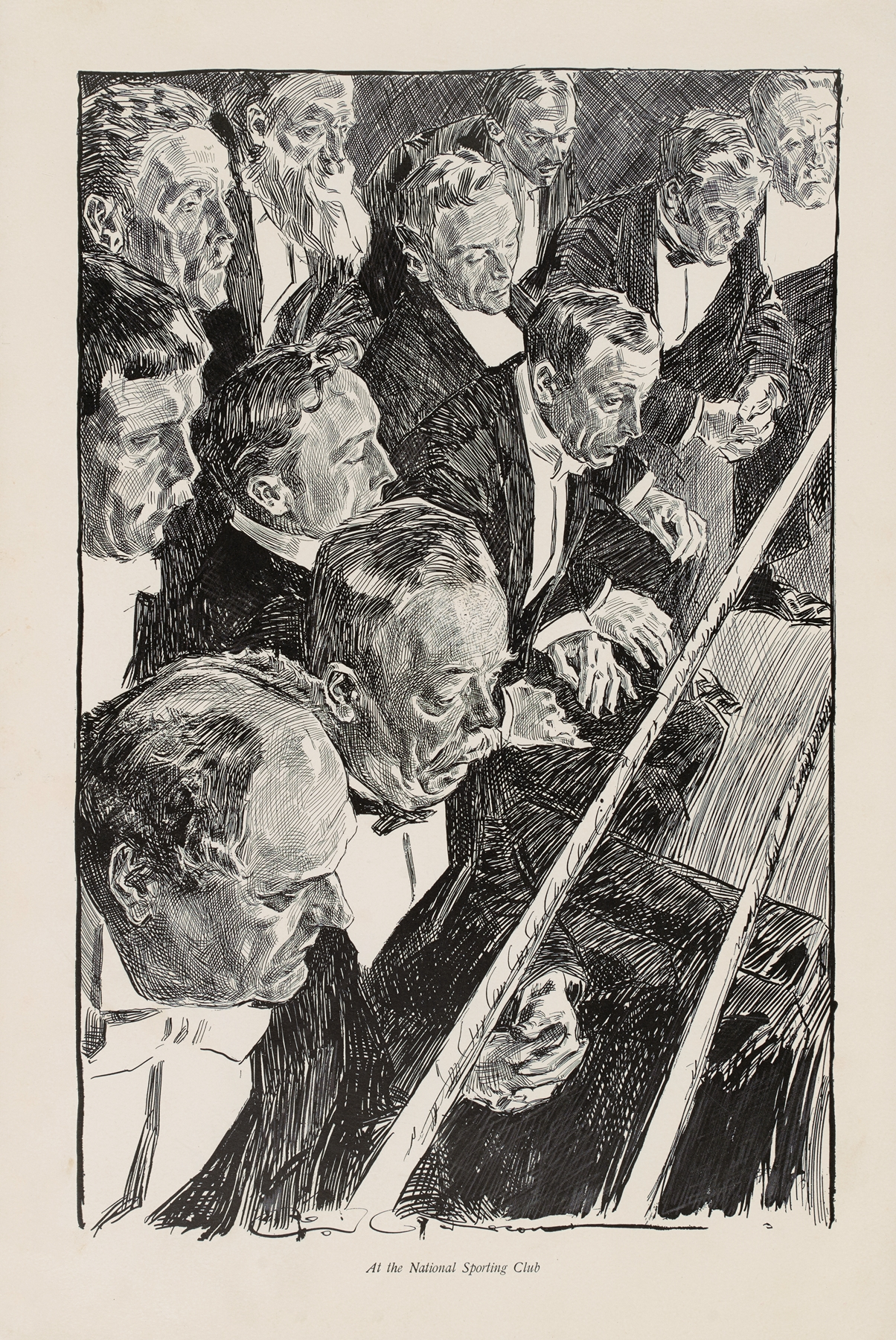
Sketch of a National Sporting Club audience, 1897

The NSC adopted the last version of the Pelican Club's rules, which were based on the Queensberry Rules of Endurance. These contained loopholes, including one that allowed holding and hitting provided the opponent was not held against a ring post or the ropes. Contests at the NSC were limited to twenty rounds, each lasting no more than three minutes, with one minute's rest between rounds. Boxers wore leather gloves containing at least 4 ounces (110 g) of hair padding. In January 1909, Sporting Life reported that the club had formally taken up the question of championship weight divisions. The NSC revised its rules that year and again in 1923.

A referee could stop a contest if he considered a boxer physically unfit to continue, a provision Deghy regarded as particularly important to fairness and humane treatment. Giving evidence at a 1901 manslaughter trial, the referee John H. Douglas agreed with defence counsel that the ten-second count was humane. He explained that a longer recovery period could allow an unfit boxer to resume. He also said that referees could stop uneven contests under a general rule covering circumstances not otherwise provided for.

Fleming required silence during contests, forbidding even whispered conversation. On one occasion, he called out "Cigars out, gentlemen, please" and delayed the first contest until every member and guest had extinguished his cigar. Deghy described Fleming and Bettinson's management as a "rough-and-ready patriarchy", in which the club's word was law. He associated this strict control over members and guests with an improvement in the standard of boxing.

The NSC appointed a single referee in place of the two used in the 1880s, and also appointed a single timekeeper. Deghy emphasised the integrity and knowledge expected of these officials. The principal referees included Bernard John Angle, George Vize and, later, Douglas. Deghy credited them with setting the standards on which the club's reputation rested. He described Angle and Douglas as stern and brusque. Angle would tell a boxer who addressed him, "You do the boxing – I'll do the talking", and would stop a bout if he thought either contestant was not trying. Vize, who served as president of the Amateur Boxing Association, was described by Bettinson as "a giant in stature and a poet at heart".

Eugene Corri, an original member of the club, became one of the best-known British referees of the early twentieth century. NSC referees had sat outside the ropes, but Corri officiated from inside the ring at the 1907 contest between Tommy Burns and Gunner Moir. Deghy described Corri as ruling "the ring with a smile" and greeting boxers with "God bless!" He also recorded criticism of Corri for yielding to the protests of Carpentier's manager, François Descamps, during the 1914 contest between Georges Carpentier and Gunboat Smith at Olympia. Deghy nevertheless considered Corri's decision to disqualify Smith for a foul correct.

The club's influence extended beyond its own contests. According to Andrew Horrall, its directors acted as an unofficial national supervisory body for boxing. With the sport's legal status uncertain, the NSC operated cautiously as a private venue tolerated by local magistrates. John Harding describes the introduction of the Lonsdale Belts in 1909 as presenting professional boxing with a choice: accept the club's right to recognise national champions, giving it authority comparable to the Football Association or the Marylebone Cricket Club, or continue without central regulation. His account of boxing around this time also describes music-hall matinees run by promoters with little knowledge of the sport, where mismatches were common and contests often became "farcical".

Matthew Taylor places the NSC within a loosely connected international boxing world, with few comparable national regulatory bodies outside Britain. When Sporting Life campaigned for an international board of control in late 1909, the NSC declined to support it, arguing that there were no established national bodies abroad with which to negotiate. The proposal came to nothing in the summer of 1910, when its English promoters also failed to attend a planned meeting in Reno.

== Membership, governance and legal status ==
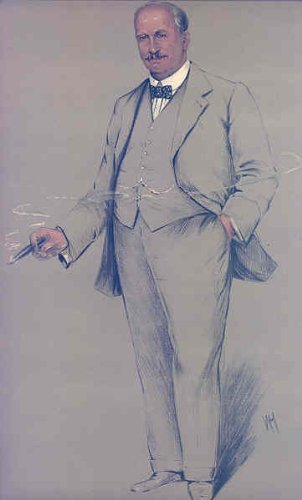
"Peggy": caricature of Arthur Frederick Bettinson published in Vanity Fair, 22 November 1911

The NSC was incorporated as the National Sporting Club Limited on 27 November 1891. Bettinson, whose capital had financed much of the venture, dominated its management for more than thirty years. Horrall describes him as an "opinionated, outspoken patriarch".

Members were elected by ballot, and the company's directors were required to belong to the club. Members could introduce guests. On ordinary nights, their names were entered in a book; for contests and other entertainments, guests needed tickets with counterfoils signed by a member. Guests were not allowed to pay for refreshments or tobacco themselves, which had to be paid for by a member. Notices warned that non-members who asked for refreshments would be expelled, and staff were instructed to enforce the rule.

In 1899, the Inland Revenue prosecuted the company for selling alcohol and tobacco without a licence. Two excise officers, Cope and Thorpe, visited the club on 24 April and bought supper, drinks and cigars. At the bar, Cope ordered a gin and soda and a bottle of Bass. When asked whether he was a member, he put down his money without answering. The officers returned on 1 May and were again served by a waiter, but the barmaid refused Cope's order after he admitted that he was not a member. The club's 1902 history mocked the officers as "Masqueraders" and described the episode as a "Charade".

On 26 July 1899, the magistrate at Bow Street Police Court, Mr Lushington, convicted the company on seven summonses. He held that the company was legally separate from the club's members and that the goods belonged to the company until supplied to those who ordered them. He imposed fines and costs, but found that there had been no attempt to evade the law and agreed to state a case for appeal.

The appeal, National Sporting Club Limited v. Cope, was heard in the High Court in January 1900. The company argued that supplying members with drinks and tobacco amounted to distributing their own property. However, some shares belonged to former members or had passed to the representatives of deceased members. The court dismissed the appeal with costs, holding that the alcohol and tobacco belonged to the company and that supplying them to members constituted retail sales requiring licences.

The club's history blamed a "technical slip" in the articles of association and described the outcome as "Law triumphant, and Common Sense prostrate". It reported that the proceedings had cost the NSC £500 (1900) (equivalent to £69,500 or US$88,800 in 2024).

== Boxing at the club ==
In October 1891, the Illustrated Sporting and Dramatic News praised the club's surroundings and described its audience of nearly 800 as exceptionally quiet and orderly.

Writing in 1929, the Australian boxer Dave Smith recalled a ring set in the front stalls, older boxers seated in a gallery on the stage, and spectators arriving in top hats. The building was much smaller than venues such as the Sydney Stadium, but Smith felt that the closeness of the spectators to the ring made it more intimate. From a chair near the ringside, he listened as Eugene Corri pointed out prominent guests from the Navy, Army and political life, "all drawn by the promise of a good fight".

=== Notable contests ===
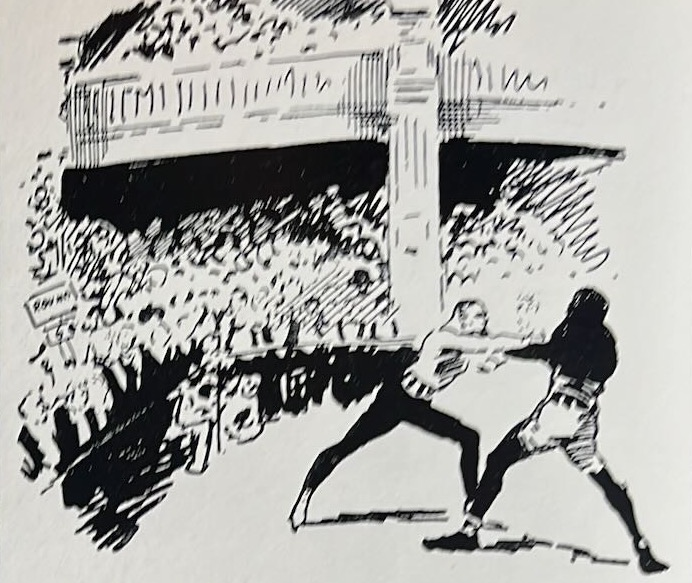
Illustration of the contest between Peter Jackson and Frank Slavin at the National Sporting Club, 30 May 1892

Peter Jackson met Frank Slavin at the club on 30 May 1892. Most spectators wore evening dress, and Lord Lonsdale called for fair play in a speech before the contest. Jackson knocked Slavin out in the tenth round. The bout prompted questions in the House of Commons. The Home Secretary distinguished athletic contests from fights intended to cause harm. He said that the police did not intend to prosecute, but that he had asked the Director of Public Prosecutions to consider whether proceedings were justified.

The seventeen-year-old bantamweight Pedlar Palmer made his club debut against Jim Collins on 27 February 1893, in a contest arranged by Fleming. In November 1895, Palmer defeated Billy Plimmer, who was disqualified in the fourteenth round. Deghy records that Palmer was also awarded the bantamweight championship of England. His appearances became known as "Palmer Nights". Deghy called him "the first of the National Sporting Club's own stars" and "perhaps the nearest thing to an intuitive artist in the ring".

The Welsh featherweight Jim Driscoll became another club favourite, appearing there between 1906 and 1919. Deghy praised his "scientific" boxing. His upright stance and straight punches belonged to a British style whose advocates contrasted it with American infighting. On 30 January 1911, Driscoll defeated Spike Robson when the referee stopped their contest in the seventh round, becoming the first boxer to win a Lonsdale Belt outright.

Driscoll and Owen Moran were scheduled to meet in Birmingham on 16 December 1911 in a contest billed as the world featherweight championship. (Note: Professional boxing had no single internationally accepted governing body during this period, and championship recognition varied between countries. In the United States, the National Police Gazette helped organise contests and back boxers; the New York State Athletic Commission and the National Boxing Association (founded in 1921) later exercised regulatory authority. In Australia, commercial promoters such as Hugh D. McIntosh staged championship contests. The International Boxing Union, founded in 1913, sought to regulate boxing internationally but struggled to secure lasting British and American participation. These divisions allowed competing claims to world and European titles.) Before it could take place, both boxers and the promoter, Gerard Austin, were summoned to court. The prosecution argued that the proposed contest was a prize fight organised for profit. The purse was £2,600 (1911) (equivalent to £361,400 or US$461,903.46 in 2024), of which the winner was to receive £1,560.

The prosecution also cited the agreement's reference to Queensberry rules and its use of the word "battle" as evidence that the contest would depend on force rather than skill. Lord Lonsdale and Bettinson attended the hearing. Corri, who had agreed to referee under NSC rules, explained that a boxer could recover from a "knock-out blow" within ten seconds and continue. He also said he would stop the contest if one boxer was clearly outclassed. The magistrate ruled that the proposed contest was a prize fight and bound the boxers over to keep the peace.

Driscoll and Moran eventually met at the NSC on 27 January 1913. Their twenty-round contest ended in a draw.

In December 1913, the French light-heavyweight Georges Carpentier knocked out the British heavyweight Billy Wells in the first round at the club.

On 31 March 1919, Edward, Prince of Wales watched Jimmy Wilde defeat the American Joe Lynch on points over fifteen rounds. After the decision, the Prince entered the ring to congratulate both boxers.

=== Deaths and legal proceedings ===
Four deaths following bouts at the NSC between 1897 and 1901 led to manslaughter proceedings against boxers and club officials. The cases tested the distinction between lawful boxing contests and illegal prize fights.

Walter Croot, a boxer from Leytonstone, faced the American Jimmy Barry at the club on 6 December 1897. Barry knocked him out late in the contest. (Note: Deghy places the knockout in the twentieth and final round, while the club's 1902 account gives the nineteenth.) Croot suffered brain injuries and was carried from the ring. He died the following morning without regaining consciousness.

Barry, Bettinson and other club officials appeared before Sir James Vaughan at Bow Street. Lonsdale told the court that there was "no brutality whatever in boxing when it is properly conducted". After the Treasury solicitor indicated that there was no case to put before a grand jury, Vaughan discharged the defendants, referring to the "thin partition" between a fight and a contest. The club's 1902 history dismissed its critics as people who were "never happy unless they are hysterical" and described the outcome as "a verdict in the interests of Common Sense".

Tom Turner was knocked out by Nathaniel Smith at the NSC on 7 November 1898 and died at Charing Cross Hospital three days later. A police officer had cautioned the organisers before the bout. Following Turner's death, Bettinson, Smith and others involved in the contest were charged with manslaughter at Bow Street. The inquest found that Turner had a weak heart. The coroner's jury returned a verdict of accidental death and recommended that boxers undergo a medical examination before entering the ring.

Addressing the grand jury on 21 November, Sir Charles Hall, the recorder of London, said that there was "absolutely nothing illegal in Boxing itself". He described it as "a noble and manly art, which I hope will never die out of this country". The following day, the grand jury threw out the indictment.

On 29 January 1900, Mike Riley of Glasgow fought Matt Precious at the club. Riley was knocked down in the seventh round and twice in the ninth. When he could not answer the call for the tenth round, Precious was declared the winner. Riley was taken unconscious to Charing Cross Hospital, where he died the following morning. Precious, Bettinson and others involved were charged with manslaughter at Bow Street and released on their own recognizances of £50 (1900) (equivalent to £6,950 or US$8,880 in 2024) each pending the inquest. The case reached the Old Bailey, where the grand jury refused to return an indictment and the defendants were released.

In 1901, Murray Livingstone, who boxed as "Billy Smith", died after a contest with Jack Roberts. Bettinson and others involved were again charged with manslaughter, with bail set at £100 (1901) (equivalent to £13,900 or US$17,800 in 2024) for each defendant. At the first trial, the prosecution questioned Bettinson closely about the club's rules. The jury could not agree on a verdict.

The retrial, Rex v. Roberts and Others, was heard at the Old Bailey in June. The defendants included Roberts, Bettinson, club officials and the boxers' seconds. The prosecution challenged the legality of the contest and argued that the verdict would determine whether competitions of this kind should continue. The defence maintained that it had been a lawful boxing competition rather than a prize fight. Lonsdale testified that the rules were intended "to minimise danger and increase science". Douglas defended the ten-second rule and said that greater precautions were taken at the NSC than elsewhere. Vize also praised the care with which the club conducted its contests.

Medical evidence indicated that Livingstone's fatal injury could have resulted from either a gloved blow or a fall, and did not necessarily require a heavy blow. In his summing up, Mr Justice Grantham said that the evidence pointed strongly towards a fall against the ropes as the cause of death. The jury found the defendants not guilty.

In June 1916, Louis Hood died after a contest with Charlie Hardcastle at the club. Bettinson, Hardcastle, the referee, the timekeeper and both boxers' seconds were arrested and remanded. The inquest returned a verdict of death by misadventure. On 4 July, the defendants were discharged after the public prosecutor decided not to proceed.

Historians differ over the legal significance of the 1897–1901 cases. Kasia Boddy writes that the unsuccessful prosecutions "legalised boxing in Britain". Matthew Taylor argues that the acquittals did not legalise the sport and that glove contests remained legally uncertain. Graeme Kent describes the 1901 acquittal as an important victory for the club. Although doubts remained, he writes, the verdict encouraged other promoters and helped boxing develop in Britain.

=== Film and broadcasting ===
The December 1907 contest between Gunner Moir and Tommy Burns at the NSC was filmed and shown at the Alhambra Theatre in Leicester Square. The club also tried unsuccessfully to secure a contest involving Jack Johnson by offering him one-third of the revenue from a film of the bout.

A radio broadcast from the NSC was scheduled for 22 February 1926, including part of a twenty-round flyweight contest between Elky Clark and Kid Socks. The broadcast was to carry the "noises and effects" at ringside, including the fighters' introductions and the call of "Seconds out". Listeners might also hear a boxer being counted out. The bout was cancelled after Clark fell ill.

== Lonsdale Belt ==
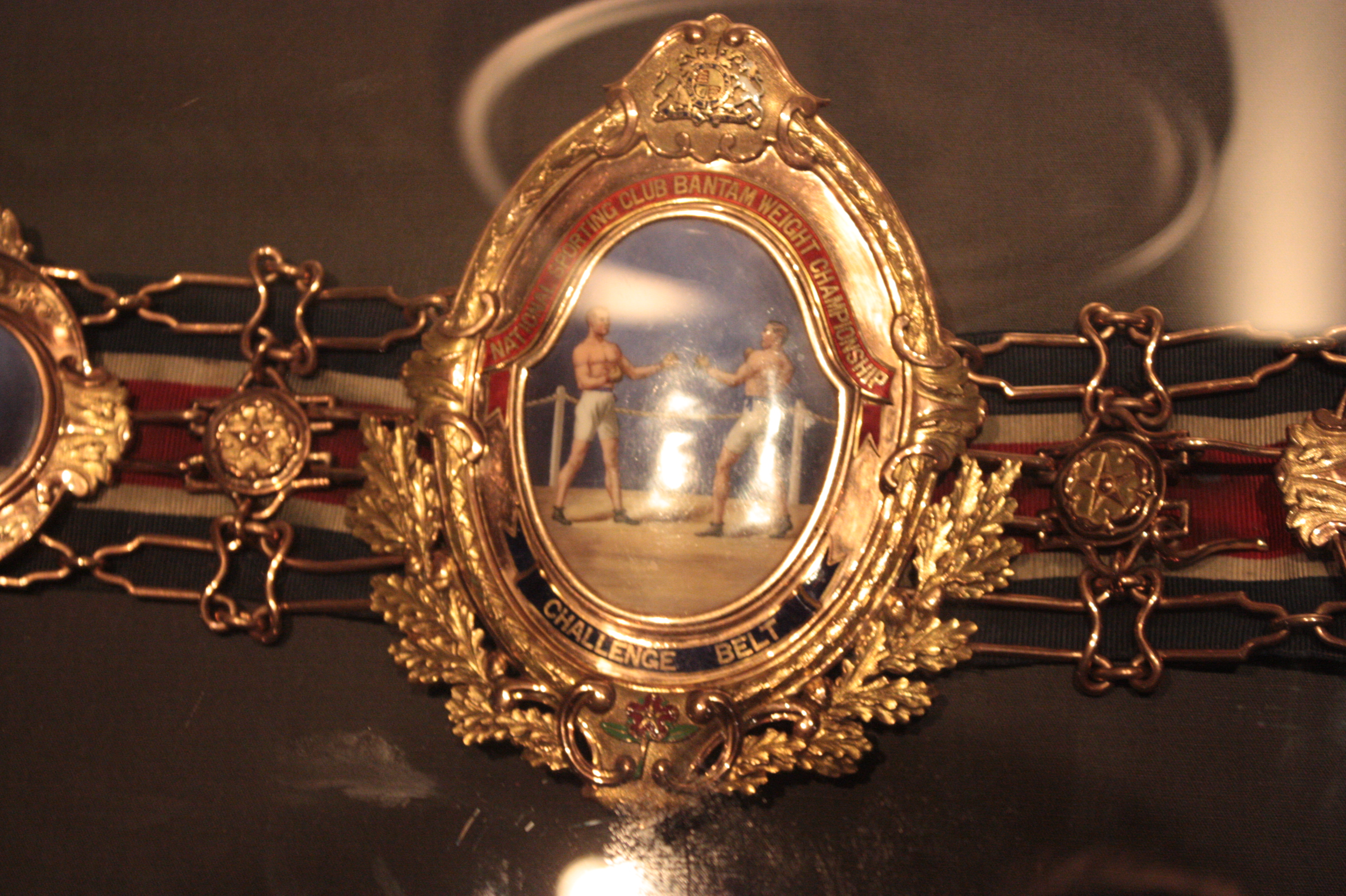
The Lonsdale Belt

In 1909, the NSC introduced Lonsdale Belts for seven championship weight divisions, from flyweight to heavyweight. The club's 1922 history explained that championships had previously "lacked definiteness", making it difficult for anyone but an expert to identify the leading boxers. Freddie Welsh became the first belt holder in November 1909 after defeating Johnny Summers for the NSC British lightweight title. A light-heavyweight belt followed in 1914.

On 22 December 1909, Sporting Life published the club's conditions for holding the belts. Three victories in NSC championship contests, consecutive or otherwise, gave a boxer outright ownership. He could also qualify after three consecutive years as undisputed holder. If a valid challenge arrived before the three years ended, he had to win the resulting contest before becoming the permanent owner, even if the bout took place later.

Holders had to insure their belts against theft and fire for £200 (1909) (equivalent to £27,800 or US$35,500 in 2024) and lodge a separate £200 security deposit with the club. The deposit was returned when the holder won the belt outright or returned it to the NSC. Permanent holders were entitled to a pension of £1 (1909) (equivalent to £139 or US$177.66 in 2024) a week for life from the age of fifty.

Harding describes the scheme as an attempt to establish the NSC's authority to recognise English, and later British, champions. Police and court restrictions on contests elsewhere reinforced some members' belief that British championship bouts should be confined to the club. Administering the belts also brought additional responsibilities. The club organised eliminating contests, decided who was eligible to compete, collected the security deposits and managed the pension scheme.

In July 1936, the British Boxing Board of Control (BBBofC) introduced a levy on major tournaments and took control of the issuing of Lonsdale Belts. Championship contests and the issuing of belts required its permission. The Board also changed the design, replacing the central image of two boxers with a portrait of Lord Lonsdale.

In November 1936, following enquiries from former permanent belt holders, the later organisation using the NSC name asked the Board to take responsibility for the pensions. The Board replied that it could not help and that its new belts carried no promise of a pension.

== Racial restrictions and the colour bar ==
The black heavyweight Peter Jackson received congratulations from NSC members after defeating Frank Slavin at the club in 1892. The club's 1902 history praised Jackson for turning to the referee "in a most chivalrous manner" before finishing the contest. It also recorded that he accompanied Bettinson to the Epsom Derby on the club coach.

Harding suggests that Jack Johnson's failure to honour an agreement to defend his title at the NSC in 1908–1909 may have influenced the club's later refusal to allow black boxers to hold a Lonsdale Belt.

Theresa Runstedtler writes that many commentators viewed Johnson's proposed 1911 contest with Billy Wells as a racial contest that could encourage unrest across the British Empire. The Home Office declared the proposed bout illegal, calling it a breach of the peace and contrary to the interests of the nation and empire. According to Runstedtler, the case provided a precedent that the Home Office later used to prohibit other high-profile interracial contests.

In the 1920s, Len Johnson was denied a British title contest despite beating several boxers who were chosen for title bouts. Harding records differing press accounts of the NSC's position. Boxing reported that there appeared to be no specific rule excluding black boxers, although none had fought at the club in recent years. The Daily Herald, however, stated in 1926 that the club had a colour bar.

The BBBofC's minutes for February 1929 referred to a requirement that British title contestants be "of white parents". The earlier rule had required only that they be "of British nationality". Harding notes that Lord Lonsdale was said to have approved the revised wording. Runstedtler links the Board's exclusion of non-white boxers, which continued until 1947, to the precedent established by the Wells–Johnson controversy.

== Other sporting and social activities ==
Horrall describes the NSC as a businesslike private club that courted middle-class patrons. It held musical and dramatic evenings featuring performers from the music halls and the theatre. Bettinson organised its first weekend gala, at which boxing alternated with performances by leading music-hall artistes, including Harry Lauder. In their 1922 history, Bettinson and Bennison expressed the hope that the club would be regarded "not only as the home of boxing, but as an entirely human agency", bringing together members from "every condition and phase of life".

In June 1902, the NSC organised a Coronation Tournament to mark the coronation of Edward VII. A preliminary display at the Royal Albert Hall was intended to raise money for the Royal Albert Orphan Asylum and survivors of the Charge of the Light Brigade. The programme combined fencing, physical culture displays and recitations with appearances by boxers including Tom Sharkey and Tommy Ryan. The tournament itself began at the club on 21 June.

The first fencing display at the NSC took place in May 1895, when two fencing professors from the University of Buda-Pesth demonstrated the use of foils. The club's 1902 history described fencing as "another science of defence" and suggested that the suppleness it developed could help boxers.

The premises included a billiards room on the first floor, while professional and amateur billiards championships were held in the club's theatre. John Roberts Jr. was among the professionals who played at the club.

Wrestling featured in the club's early programmes, on one occasion replacing boxing for the evening. In January 1909, the NSC advertised a catch-as-catch-can tournament at the Alhambra Theatre, following one held the previous year. The competition was advertised as open to the world, with £400 (1909) (equivalent to £55,600 or US$71,100 in 2024) in prize money and belts for the winners. Lord Lonsdale was among its patrons. The club's 1922 history praised the "clean, honest wrestling" at the Alhambra and recorded a middleweight victory by Crozier, whom it described as "a man of colour".

== First World War ==
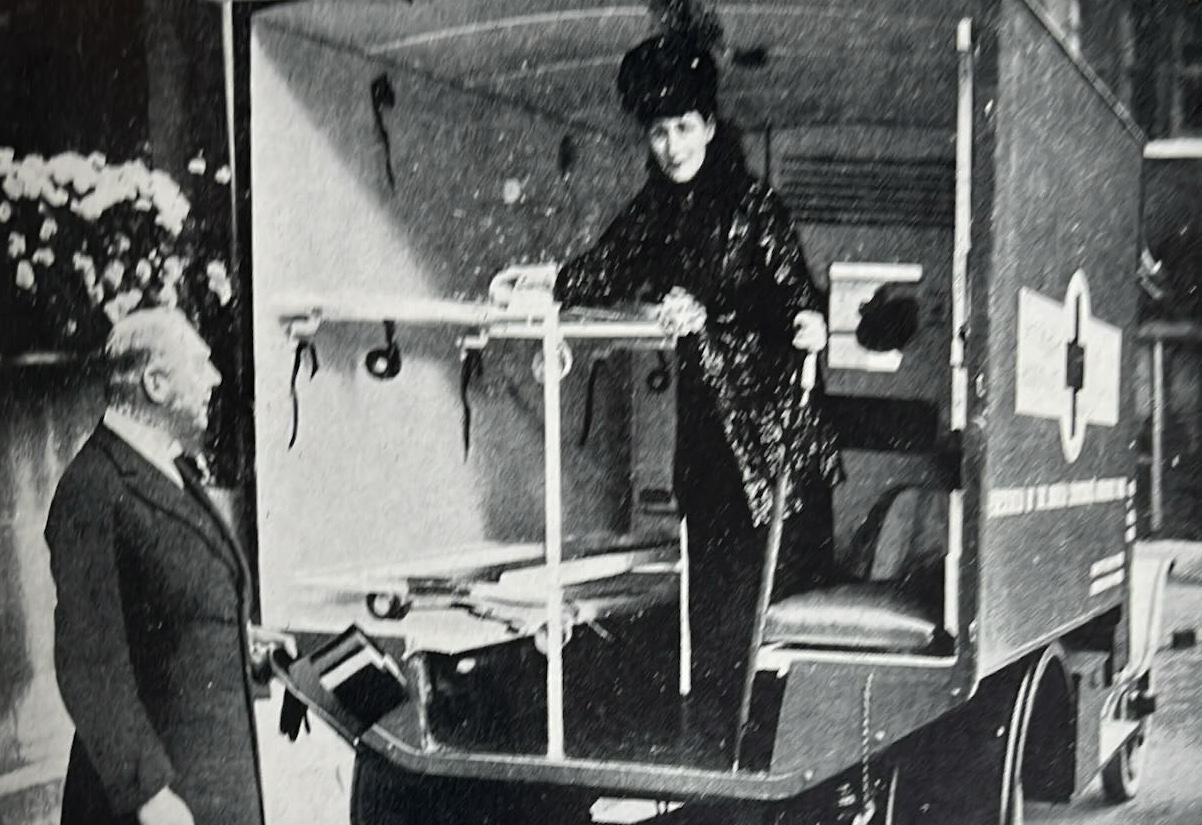
Queen Alexandra inspecting an ambulance of the British Sportsmen's Ambulance Fund during the First World War, accompanied by the Earl of Lonsdale

At the outbreak of the First World War, the NSC's committee held an emergency meeting and decided to keep the club open and support the Allied war effort. The British Sportsmen's Ambulance Fund was established at the club, and its fully equipped ambulance column served on the Western Front. Deghy records that the club's final appeal raised nearly £250,000.

The NSC continued to stage contests throughout the war. Its 1922 history described the club as a "playground for men of the Services". Writing in 1940, Bennison recalled that boxing was held once a week for service personnel. The club also held evenings for American sailors, soldiers and airmen on leave, attended by representatives of several Allied nations.

Contests sometimes continued during air raids. Bettinson and Bennison recalled a championship bout proceeding while bombs fell a few hundred yards away. Pat O'Keeffe won the middleweight Lonsdale Belt outright against Bandsman Blake during a raid which, according to Bettinson and Bennison, left Blake's nerves "sorely affected".

Boxing was also popular behind the lines, where officers who had been NSC members helped to promote it. It was often compared with bayonet training as a means of developing controlled aggression, and was thought to build fighting spirit in spectators as well as participants. By September 1916, the War Office had described sport as "virtually a military duty" and stipulated that soldiers injured in properly organised military games should receive compensation. Harding argues that wartime restrictions and the NSC's links with the Imperial Services Boxing Association gave its officials more opportunity to organise and regulate boxing.

Harding describes championship belt holders, particularly serving men, as patriotic symbols. O'Keeffe took part in recruiting, and his trainer Fred Dartnell later recalled his appeal: "Join the army and you'll be a champion like me!" Boxers associated with the club served in the armed forces, both in combat and as physical-training instructors. Jerry Delaney was training with the Sportsmen's Battalion when he defeated the American Jack Denny at the club. The club's 1922 history also recounted how Braddock of the Royal Marines carried a wounded comrade to safety under shellfire. (Note: Bettinson and Bennison's 1922 account identified Braddock's decoration as the Military Medal. When Bennison retold the episode in 1940, he named the Distinguished Conduct Medal instead.)

In December 1918, the British Empire and American Services Boxing Tournament was held at the Royal Albert Hall. The Journal described it as the first occasion on which George V had given boxing his patronage. The King was unable to attend. Prince Albert represented him, presented the King's Trophy and delivered a message from the King. Several NSC regulars competed. Jimmy Wilde outpointed the American Joe Lynch in the bantamweight competition, and Billy Wells defeated Joe Beckett in the heavyweight final. The British Army team won the King's Trophy.

== Relationship with the British Boxing Board of Control ==
In June 1918, the establishment of a British Board of Boxing Control was announced from the NSC's premises in Covent Garden. (Note: Bettinson and Bennison use the name "British Board of Boxing Control" in their 1922 history. Harding calls the earlier body the "British Boxing Board of Control".) The club established the Board without consulting the Imperial Services Boxing Association, and most of its members belonged to the NSC. John Murray, editor of Boxing, called it "the narrowest oligarchy known for some centuries".

Past and present Lonsdale Belt holders selected Billy Wells, Jim Driscoll and Pat O'Keeffe as the first professional boxers to serve on the Board. The three also shared responsibility for administering the newly established Professional Boxers' Benevolent Fund, which supported former boxers in financial difficulty.

Bettinson and Bennison defended the arrangement in their 1922 history. They described it as "born of necessity" because professional boxing was "largely made up of loose ends". They rejected the accusation that it was merely "the National Sporting Club under a new guise" as "unfair and untrue". In their view, the NSC's position in British boxing made Covent Garden the natural base for the new Board.

The authors wanted the Board to become the "M.C.C. of Boxing", an authority recognised by promoters and boxers as the Marylebone Cricket Club was in cricket. They regarded securing parliamentary legislation to legalise boxing as its first priority. International regulation also remained unsettled. The International Boxing Union (IBU), founded in 1913, sought to govern boxing worldwide, but its authority remained largely confined to continental Europe.

Plans to reorganise the Board were approved at a meeting at Australia House in January 1929. According to Harding, Lord Lonsdale secured agreement by telling those present to accept the new Board or lose him as professional boxing's figurehead. NSC members remained prominent in the reorganised body. Loudcher and Day describe the change as creating a more centralised and democratic organisation that no longer operated merely as an extension of the NSC.

The club also responded to criticism that British championship contests were concentrated in London. By late 1929, it was working with promoters in Manchester and Liverpool, where NSC-sponsored title contests followed in 1930.

The NSC later left the Board's governing body, ending an association that Harding describes as a source of disputes since 1919. In July 1936, the Board introduced a levy on major tournaments and took control of issuing championship belts. Promoters could no longer stage a championship contest or issue a belt without its permission.

== Decline and closure of the original club ==
The rising cost of major contests favoured venues that could accommodate larger audiences than the NSC. Harding writes that Bettinson and the club regarded promoters such as Charles B. Cochran as a threat to boxing because their large purses drove up fighters' financial expectations. According to Harding, the NSC declared the British heavyweight title vacant after Joe Beckett defeated Bombardier Wells at Cochran's Holborn Stadium in 1919. It then matched Frank Goddard with Jack Curphey for a new belt. Bettinson and Bennison claimed that Beckett had "deemed a Lonsdale Belt beneath his dignity; there was not enough money in it for him".

In June 1929, Eugene Corri reflected on a testimonial held in his honour at the NSC. He wrote that he had lived long enough to see boxing "come full into its kingdom". That October, the club opened its new season at the Stadium Club. The Daily Express described the programme as weak and the attendance as unexpectedly small, and reported that some members missed the atmosphere of Covent Garden.

The sale of 43 King Street was reported that month, ending the club's association with its home since 1891. Country Life reported that the freehold had been sold for redevelopment. The plans called for the interior to be demolished once boxing had found new headquarters, while retaining the historic façade.

Lionel Bettinson, who had inherited his father's assets, worked with James Lambert to continue the Monday-night contests at the Stadium Club in Holborn. Lambert had taken over matchmaking after Arthur Bettinson's death. The club itself moved to 21 Soho Square on 1 January 1930.

A notice published in The London Gazette in November 1930 stated that the original National Sporting Club Ltd. was being wound up voluntarily. It named L. F. Bettinson and T. Howard Head as joint liquidators and identified 43 King Street as the company's former registered office. In November 1931, a further notice announced a general meeting of members for 14 December. Members were to receive the liquidators' account and decide how to dispose of the company's books, accounts and other documents.

=== Revival in 1936 ===
A new boxing promotion organisation using the NSC name was established in 1936. The Belfast News-Letter later described it as "quite distinct from the original National Sporting Club". In February 1937, Jack Doyle defeated the Dutch heavyweight champion Harry Staal in six rounds before 10,000 spectators. The Dundee Courier described the venue as the NSC's Earl's Court headquarters.

On 5 March 1937, the Belfast Telegraph reported the formation of a new company with capital of £40,000 (1937) (equivalent to £3 million or US$4 million in 2024). (Note: Deghy gives the company's nominal capital as £30,000 (1937) (equivalent to £2 million or US$3 million in 2024).) The newspaper named Admiral Sir Lionel Halsey as chairman and stated that tournaments would continue at the Empress Stadium.

A creditors' meeting was called for 12 February 1940 at the Institute of Chartered Accountants, Moorgate Place, under the Companies Act 1929. The Evening Despatch reported that meetings of creditors and shareholders had been adjourned to allow attempts to keep the club operating in a modified form until the war ended. Shareholders were considering a resolution to wind up the company voluntarily.

On 10 December 1940, members resolved to wind up the company voluntarily, stating that its liabilities prevented it from continuing in business. Creditors confirmed the resolution and the appointment of Kenneth Arthur Layton-Bennett as liquidator at a meeting later that day.

=== Post-war use of the name ===
A new company, N.S.C. Ltd., was registered in May 1947. The club opened at the Empress Club in September 1951 and moved to the Café Royal on Regent Street in 1955. Boxing at the Café Royal was filmed by British Pathé that year. Writing in 1956, Deghy described the club as a licensed boxing promoter with no official regulatory status. Contests under the NSC name continued at the Café Royal into the late twentieth century.

The British Sports Book Awards grew out of the lunches and dinners organised by a later organisation using the National Sporting Club name. (Note: The awards' organisers date their beginnings to 2002. Sky Sports stated in 2015 that they had been launched in 2003 and that it had supported them since their launch.)

== Legacy ==
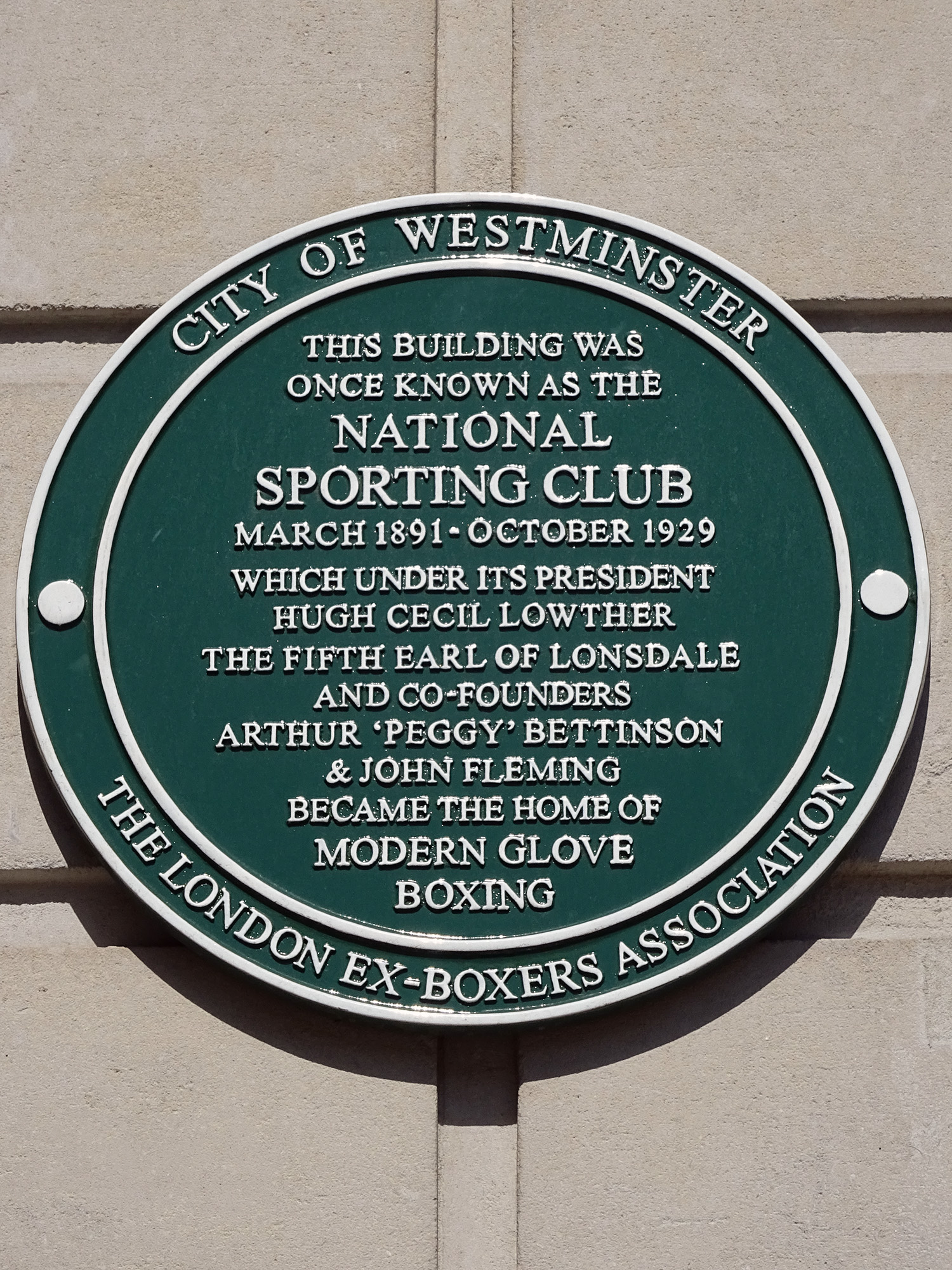
Commemorative plaque at the former National Sporting Club premises, 43 King Street, Covent Garden

Deghy described the strict discipline Fleming imposed on spectators and credited the club's referees with establishing its reputation for fair contests. In their 1922 history, Bettinson and Bennison called boxing "a game of chivalry" whose standing had been "won by unceasing toil". They described the club as "a rallying ground" whenever the sport was attacked.

Matthew Taylor describes the NSC as Britain's leading boxing venue and effective headquarters in the early twentieth century, when few comparable regulatory institutions existed outside Britain. Its influence over the early Board of Control drew criticism, and the NSC later withdrew from the Board's governing body. The Board's rules excluded non-white boxers from British title contests until 1947.

Deghy emphasised the importance of betting to the club's foundation and activities. He argued that many of the wider changes in boxing during its existence had come about more by accident than by design. Nevertheless, he credited the NSC with helping professional boxing become an established part of British entertainment and improving the social standing of boxers.

== Works cited ==
- Bettinson, A. F.; Bennison, B. (1922). The Home of Boxing. London: Odhams Press.
- Bettinson, A. F.; Tristram, W. Outram, eds. (1902). The National Sporting Club: Past and Present. London: Sands & Co.
- Boddy, Kasia (2011). ""A Straight Left against a Slogging Ruffian": National Boxing Styles in the Years Preceding the First World War". Journal of Historical Sociology. 24 (4): 428–450. doi:10.1111/j.1467-6443.2011.01413.x. Archived from the original on 1 July 2026.
- Deghy, Guy (1956). Noble and Manly: The History of the National Sporting Club. London: Hutchinson & Co. Ltd.
- Harding, John (2016). Lonsdale's Belt: Boxing's Most Coveted Prize. Worthing: Pitch Publishing. ISBN 978-1-78531-254-0 (Kindle e-book).
- Horrall, Andrew (2001). Popular Culture in London c.1890–1918: The Transformation of Entertainment. Manchester: Manchester University Press. ISBN 0-7190-5783-3.
- Kent, Graeme (2015). Boxing's Strangest Fights: Incredible but true encounters from over 250 years of boxing history. Portico. ISBN 978-1-910232-43-9 (Kindle e-book).
- Lang, Arne K. (2008). Prizefighting: An American History. Jefferson, North Carolina: McFarland. ISBN 978-0-7864-3654-5.
- Loudcher, Jean-François; Day, Dave (2013). "The International Boxing Union (1913–1946): A European Sports and/or Political Failure?". The International Journal of the History of Sport. 30 (17): 2016–2030. doi:10.1080/09523367.2013.828038. Archived from the original on 1 July 2026.
- Lynch, Bohun (1922). Knuckles and Gloves. London: W. Collins Sons & Co.
- Mason, Tony; Riedi, Eliza (2010). Sport and the Military: The British Armed Forces 1880–1960. Cambridge University Press. ISBN 978-0-521-87714-5.
- Runstedtler, Theresa (2012). Jack Johnson, Rebel Sojourner: Boxing in the Shadow of the Global Color Line. Berkeley: University of California Press. ISBN 978-0-520-27160-9.
- Taylor, Matthew (2013). "The global ring? Boxing, mobility, and transnational networks in the anglophone world, 1890–1914". Journal of Global History. 8 (2). Cambridge University Press: 231–255. doi:10.1017/S174002281300020X.
- Vorspan, Rachel (2000). ""Rational Recreation" and the Law: The Transformation of Popular Urban Leisure in Victorian England" (PDF). McGill Law Journal. 45: 891–973. Archived (PDF) from the original on 9 April 2026.
