= Jack Harrison (boxer) =

Personal information
- Nationality: British
- Born: John Harrison; 15 October 1888 Bozeat, Northamptonshire
- Died: 1970, aged 82
- Weight: Middleweight, heavyweight

Boxing career

John Harrison (15 October 1888 – 1970) was a British boxer who was British middleweight champion in 1912.

== Career ==
Born in Bozeat and raised in Bozeat and Rushden, Harrison was a former Guardsman who first fought at middleweight. His first known fight was in 1907.

Harrison beat Harry Mansfield on points at the National Sporting Club, Covent Garden in May 1911. In May 1912 he beat Pat McEnroy to take the British middleweight title vacated by Jim Sullivan and the Lonsdale Belt.

He travelled to the United States in August 1912 with Welsh boxer Eddie Morgan, and fought Eddie McGoorty for the World middleweight title at Madison Square Garden; McGoorty knocked Harrison out in the first round to take the title. He also lost to Young Sammy Smith. He returned to the UK and fought Ted Kid Lewis in December 1912, losing by a third-round knockout.

He suffered further defeats to American welterweight Harry Lewis in March 1913, and Nichol Simpson in September 1913 (in a catchweight contest) as well as defeats to Ike Pratt and Gunner Burrows. Harrison was due to defend his British title against Pat O'Keeffe, but Harrison's lack of form led to him relinquishing the title on 12 November.

He returned to training at the Black Bull in Whetstone, and in January 1914 he fought Jim Sullivan in an eliminator to face the winner of the middleweight title fight between O'Keeffe and Harry Reeve on the same bill; Sullivan won in four rounds.

He continued to be involved in boxing, and by the 1920s had moved up to heavyweight and became Midlands champion; He lost to Harry Gold in January 1924 and knocked Fred Phipps out in the third round of a contest at Rushden in August 1924.

Jack Harrison died in 1970, aged 82. A commemorative blue plaque was placed on his former home in West Street, on the Prime Choice Letting & Estate Agents building, by the Rushden & District History Society.
