= Jim Sullivan (boxer) =

British boxer (1886–1949)

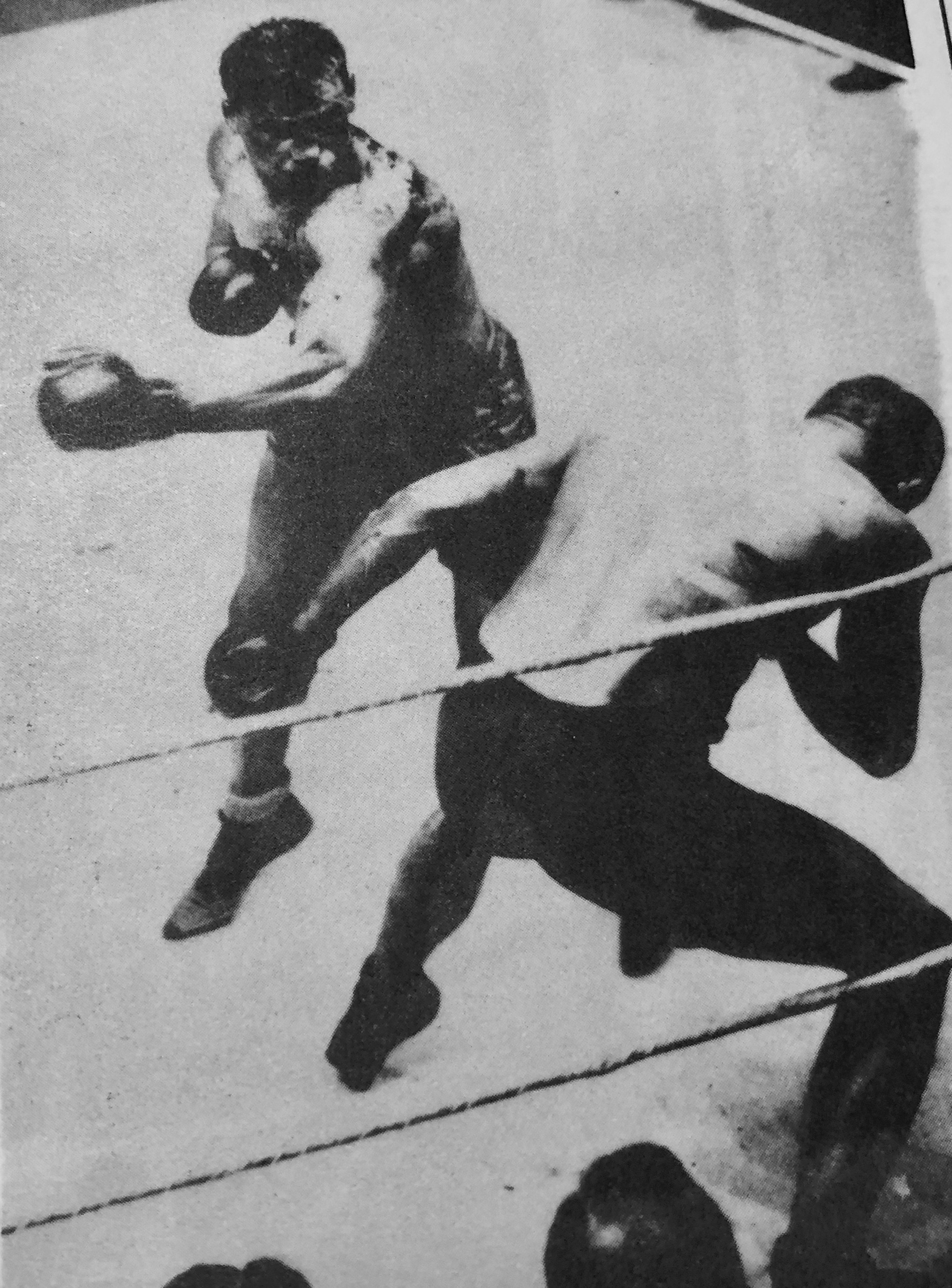
- Sullivan (left) vs O'Keeffe (right). Sullivans white shorts dark with blood. 21 February 1916.

Personal information
- Nationality: British
- Born: 7 June 1886 Bermondsey, London
- Died: 22 July 1949 (aged 63) Wimbledon
- Weight: Middleweight

Boxing career
- Stance: Orthodox

Boxing record
- Total fights: 44
- Wins: 27
- Win by KO: 15
- Losses: 14
- Draws: 3

Jim Sullivan (7 June 1886 – 22 July 1949) was a British boxer who was British middleweight champion between 1910 and 1912. He went on to challenge for the European title.

== Career ==
From Bermondsey, Jim Sullivan began his professional career in 1908. After early fights which included two draws and two wins against Curly Watson, Sullivan fought Tom Thomas for the British middleweight title in November 1910, winning a 20-round points decision.

In June 1911 he fought Billy Papke for the British version of the World middleweight title, losing after being knocked down at the end of the ninth round and failing to come out of his corner for the tenth. Sullivan was denied a rematch after Papke sailed back to America a month later.

Sullivan travelled to America hoping to fight but the trip was marred by illness and he returned home.

His next fight was against Georges Carpentier in February 1912 for the European title in Monte Carlo; Carpentier won by a second round knockout.

On 12 April 1912, after suffering ill-health for some time, Sullivan relinquished his British title and announced his retirement from boxing, intending to undertake a sea voyage to regain his health. His retirement was short-lived and he returned with a first round knockout of Pat Bradley in July 1912. He travelled to Australia in 1913 where he beat Reggie Midwood in April and there were plans for a fight with Australian champion Dave Smith but Sullivan suffered a poisoned foot and was beaten in Sydney by Bradley in July and in October by Jerry Jerome.

Back in England, Sullivan's title had still not been taken by another fighter by 1914. Pat O'Keeffe took the title with a win over Harry Reeve, and Sullivan beat Jack Harrison in an eliminator to challenge O'Keeffe for the title. Sullivan fought O'Keeffe for the British title twice in 1914, losing both fights on points.

Sullivan served in the British Army during World War I and by 1916 had reached the rank of corporal in the London Scottish. He challenged O'Keeffe again in February 1916 in a non-title catchweight contest and was once again beaten on points in what was at the time considered one of the best fights ever seen in England; Unable to split the fighters after twenty rounds, the referee ordered an extra round with O'Keeffe being declared the victor at the end. In March 1917 he lost to Harry Reeve after being knocked out in the eleventh round.

He saw active service in France and in December 1917 was reported to have been wounded in action. By 1919 he was a Director of Physical Training in the Army and featured in newspaper adverts endorsing Reudel Bath Saltrates.

By 1920 he was back in the UK and working in Oxford training "Varsity men", and had begun preparing for a return to boxing. He fought Tom Gummer in March 1920 for the vacant British title; He retired in the fourteenth round. His final fight was a defeat to Archie Northrope on 30 November 1920, the fight being stopped in the fourth round due to a cut over Sullivan's eye.

On 13 January 1927 Sullivan was erroneously reported to have died "after a short and painful illness" by several newspapers. He was in fact alive and well.

Sullivan's son Jimmy followed him into a career as a boxer and had his first fight in May 1929.

In August 1933, Jim Sullivan suffered burns after a car caught fire while being filled with petrol; His nine-year-old son was critically injured in the same incident after suffering severe burns.

Jim Sullivan died on 22 July 1949, aged 63, in the Atkinson Hospital in Wimbledon.

== Video ==
Video: Jim Sullivan training for fight against Pat O'Keeffe on YouTube
