= Bandsman Jack Blake =

English boxer

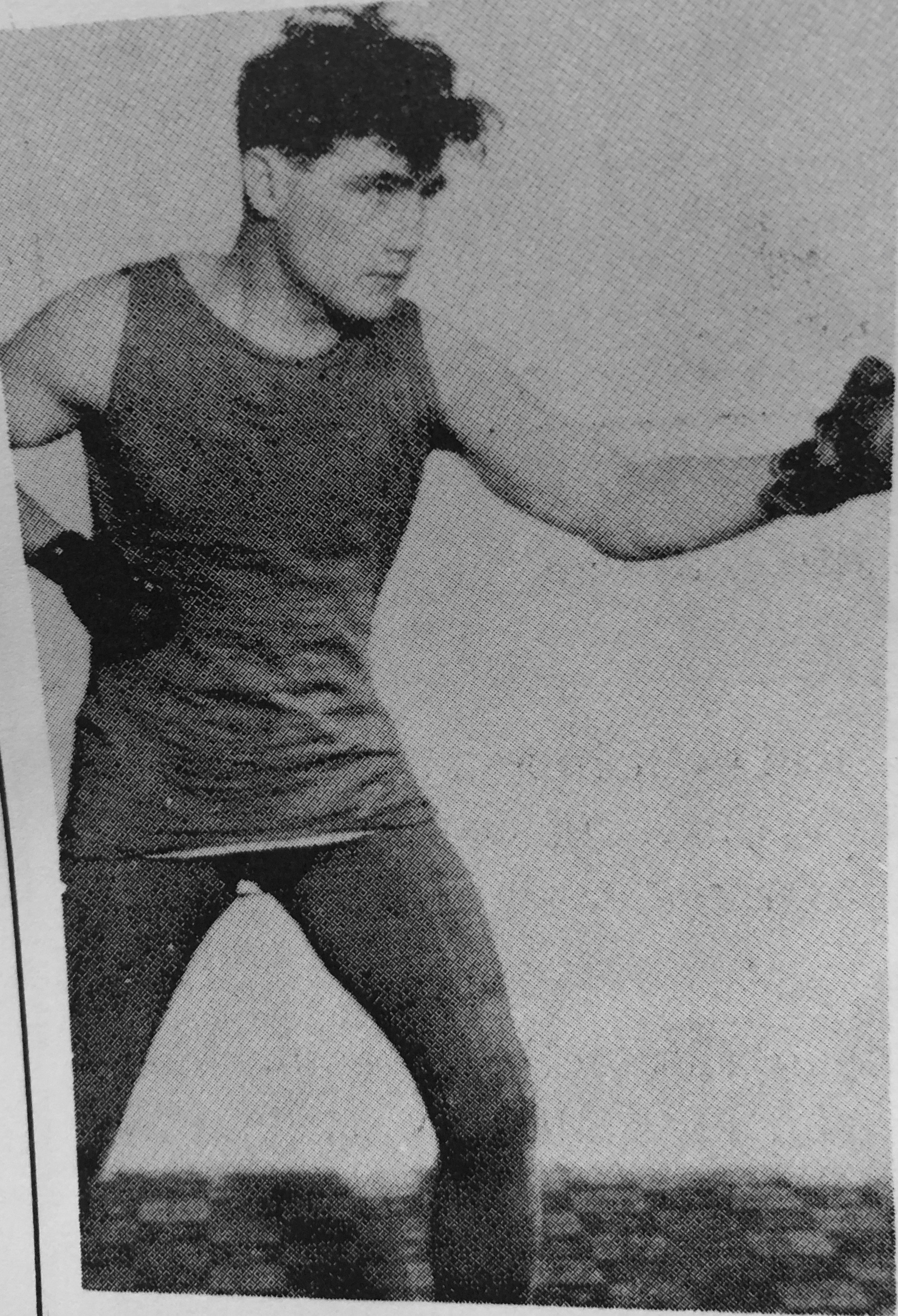

Personal information
- Nationality: British
- Born: John Blake; 1890 Great Yarmouth, Norfolk, England
- Died: 2 September 1960 (aged 70) Great Yarmouth, Norfolk, England
- Height: 177 cm (5 ft 10 in)
- Weight: Middleweight

Boxing career

Boxing record
- Total fights: 18
- Wins: 9
- Win by KO: 4
- Losses: 8
- No contests: 1

John Blake (1890 – 2 September 1960), better known as Bandsman Jack Blake, was a British boxer who became British middleweight champion in 1916.

== Career ==
Born in Tower Street, Great Yarmouth, in 1890, John Blake was the son of a fisherman. He attended the Nelson School in Yarmouth and joined the 2nd battalion, Norfolk Regiment of the British Army at the age of fourteen, serving in several overseas countries, leading to his 'Bandsman' title which stuck throughout his career.

His boxing career began in the army; he was entered into a boxing contest without his knowledge while serving in Gibraltar. Initial success led to his pursuing it further and by 1912 he was army champion of India.

He left the army and turned professional in 1912, and remained unbeaten in the first two years of his professional career, including victories over the Dixie Kid, Jack Harrison, and Young Johnny Johnson. Georges Carpentier, writing for the People's Journal in January 1914, was highly complimentary of Blake, describing him as a "most promising man", and having "the right stuff in him...the right temperament".

In March 1914, despite being very much a middleweight, he fought for the British heavyweight title against Bombardier Billy Wells; Wells won with a fourth-round knockout, inflicting the first defeat of Blake's career. In April 1914 he fought American Joe Borrell in a fight billed as being for the 160 lbs world title; Borrell knocked Blake down as he was returning to his corner after the bell at the end the fourth round, and with Blake unable to continue the referee declared it a no contest.

In August 1914, after the outbreak of World War I, Blake put both his boxing career and his forthcoming marriage on hold and rejoined the 2nd Norfolk Regiment. He was wounded in action in September 1914 and returned to England, where he was treated at the Royal Herbert Hospital in Blackheath.

Blake was still unbeaten at middleweight and won fights against Nicol Simpson and Harry Reeve before losing to Pat O'Keeffe in May 1915. A year later he fought O'Keeffe for the British middleweight title, taking a twenty-round points decision to become champion. O'Keefe regained the title in January 1918, knocking Blake out in the second round. Blake lost to Army champion Corporal Tooley of the Grenadier Guards in April 1918, and his final fight was a win by fourth-round knockout against Arthur Cameron in 1921.

After retiring from boxing, Blake played association football for Great Yarmouth Town F.C., swam and angled competitively, and became a boxing referee. Between the wars he was a publican, running the Army and Navy public house on Blackfriars Road in Great Yarmouth. For the rest of his life he worked as a swimming instructor at an open-air pool in the town.

Blake died at his home on North Denes Road on 2 September 1960, aged 70.
