= Pat O'Keeffe =

British professional boxer (1883–1960)

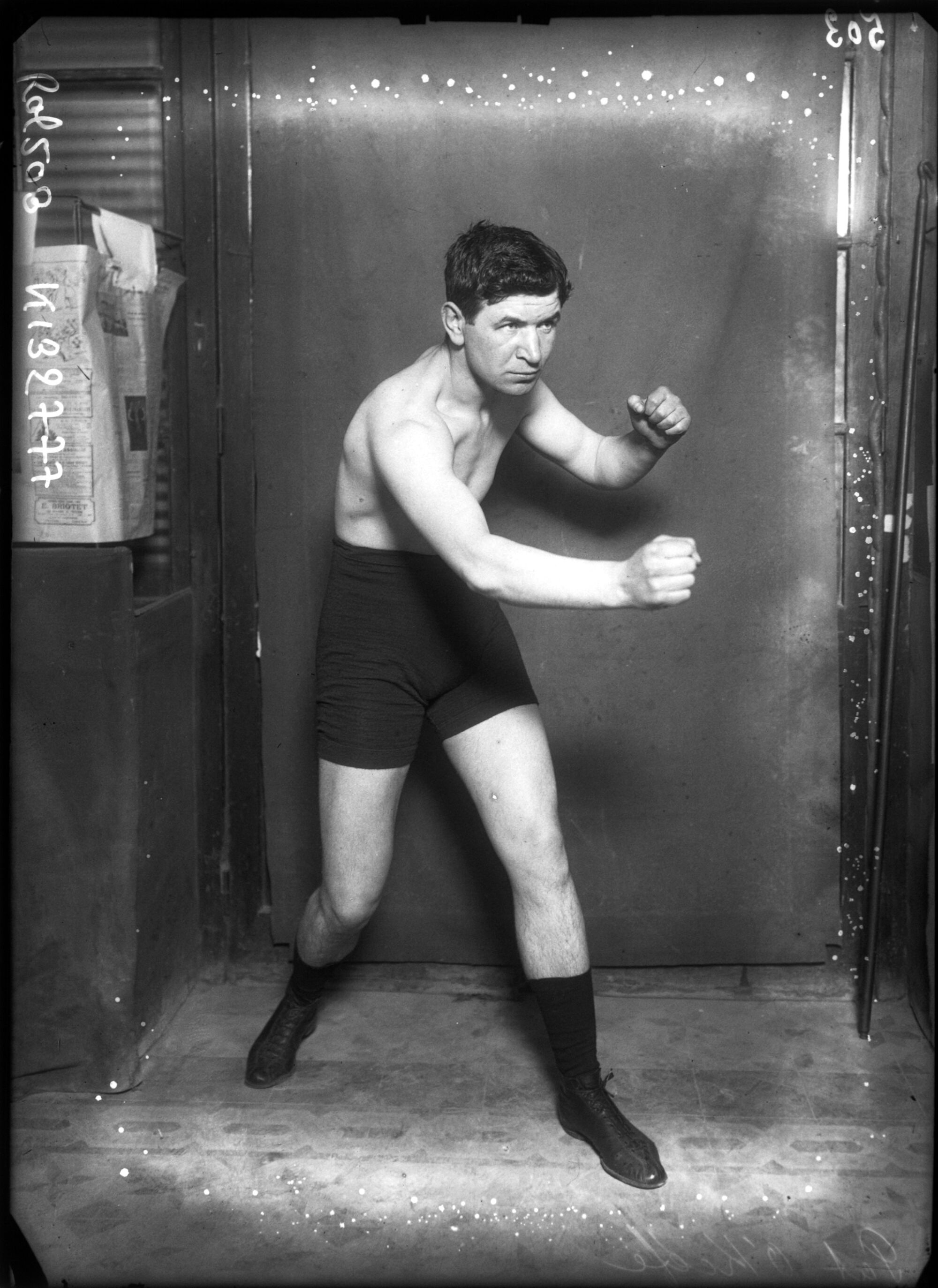
- O'Keeffe in a 1908 press photograph

Personal information
- Nationality: British
- Born: 17 March 1883 Bromley-by-Bow, England
- Died: 16 August 1960 (aged 77) Mount Vernon Hospital, Northwood, England
- Height: 5 ft 10 in (1.78 m)
- Weight: Welterweight, Middleweight, Heavyweight

Boxing career
- Stance: Orthodox

Boxing record
- Total fights: 131
- Wins: 88
- Win by KO: 36
- Losses: 25
- Draws: 7
- No contests: 11

Pat O'Keeffe (Note: His surname was also spelled O'Keefe in contemporary newspaper coverage.) (17 March 1883 – 16 August 1960) was a British professional boxer who held the National Sporting Club's (NSC) British middleweight title. His professional career lasted from 1902 to 1918 and included contests in France, the United States and Australia. He also fought Bombardier Billy Wells and Georges Carpentier in bouts billed as the British and European heavyweight championships, losing both by knockout.

During the First World War, O'Keeffe served with the 1st Surrey Rifles, recruiting and training soldiers and also working as a military policeman. He continued to box while serving and regained the middleweight title from Bandsman Blake on 28 January 1918. This final professional contest took place during a German air raid on London and secured him outright ownership of the Lonsdale Belt.

In 1918, O'Keeffe was one of three professional boxers selected to serve on the NSC-dominated boxing board that preceded the modern British Boxing Board of Control. After leaving the army in 1919, he worked as a publican, boxing trainer and referee. He also wrote a boxing column for the Daily Herald and continued to take part in charity exhibitions.

== Early life ==
Pat O'Keeffe was born on 17 March 1883 in Bromley-by-Bow. The 1891 census recorded him living in the West Ham area with his parents, Patrick and Catherine O'Keeffe, and five siblings. Both parents were born in Ireland, and his father worked as a gas stoker. By the 1901 census, the eighteen-year-old O'Keeffe was working as a labourer at the gas works, as was his older brother John. The 1911 census recorded him still living in West Ham and single, with his occupation given as professional boxer.

Although born and raised in England, O'Keeffe identified himself as Irish. In a 1907 interview with The Washington Herald during his American tour, he said of himself and fellow boxers Owen Moran and Johnny Summers: "We were raised in England, but we have no English blood in us." The paper noted that all three spoke with English accents but agreed that they were Irish, calling them "Englishmen only by the fact that their parents lived in England".

By the early twentieth century, boxing had become established in London's working-class communities. Historian Matthew Taylor describes the sport as widely practised in inner-city areas, with clubs, drill halls, church halls, polytechnics and evening institutes providing places to take part. In Canning Town, one earlier example was Pedlar Palmer, whom historian of British popular culture Andrew Horrall describes as having been trained, developed and promoted by the National Sporting Club (NSC).

O'Keeffe began boxing as an amateur in 1901 with the Canning Town Athletic Club. He won a 9 st 6 lb (60 kg; 132 lb) open competition at the Columbia Boxing Club, defeating Churchill of Greenwich, Buxton of Shoreditch and Tom Keeffe of the Greenwich Boxing Club, before turning professional in 1902. A 1905 profile gave his height as 5 ft 10 in (1.78 m) and his weight as 10 st 6 lb (66 kg; 146 lb).

== Professional boxing ==
=== Early career: 1902–1907 ===
O'Keeffe (left) facing Charlie Allum at the Salle Wagram, Paris, 2 March 1907. O'Keeffe won by knockout, in a bout billed as the French middleweight championship.

In September 1902, O'Keeffe defeated Fred Lewis over six rounds at the Drill Hall, Beresford Street, Woolwich. That November, he beat Jack Palmer twice in six-round contests. O'Keeffe won a 10 st 7 lb (67 kg; 147 lb) competition at Olympia, beating Tom Ireland in the first round, Ted Percy in the semi-final and Jack Kingsland in the final. Sporting Life described him driving Percy to the ropes in the last round of their bout and landing punches with both hands.

By 1906, O'Keeffe had fought many of the leading contenders for the middleweight title of England. He was then selected to face Mike Crawley in a bout billed as the championship and won over fifteen rounds. A month later, he defended the title against Charlie Allum, knocking him out in the sixth round. In his next bout, he lost the title to Tom Thomas on points over fifteen rounds at the National Sporting Club (NSC).

The following year, O'Keeffe again knocked out Allum, this time in Paris, winning £200 (1907) (equivalent to £27,800 or US$35,500 in 2024). The bout was billed as the French middleweight championship.

=== International career: 1907–1910 ===
Managed in America by Charley Harvey, O'Keeffe was described in an August 1907 preview in The Buffalo Enquirer as "a tall slim lad of six feet". His upright stance gave him "the appearance of a giraffe", while his long arms "resemble telegraph poles". The paper praised his endurance and right hand, saying he could fight all day and finish as fresh as he had started.

In late 1907, O'Keeffe drew with Billy Papke after a hard-fought bout in Philadelphia. He also lost on points to Harry Lewis in Chelsea, Massachusetts. That December, the Illustrated Police Budget reported that American audiences "think very highly of his abilities". It described him as having come through the six-round Papke bout "with flying colours".

A bout against Willie Lewis was scheduled for 19 December 1907 in New York, but police obtained an injunction against the venue. When the contest took place, Lewis won by knockout.

In his memoirs, the referee Eugene Corri recounted a story about O'Keeffe fighting Willie Lewis in Paris. Before the bout, Lewis mocked O'Keeffe's stomach and warned that a punch there might kill him. According to Corri, O'Keeffe then guarded his stomach with his left forearm, leaving his chin exposed to the punch that knocked him out.

O'Keeffe returned to England in February 1908 and placed a notice in Sporting Life declaring that he was "here for business". The accompanying article reported that he had contracted malaria in the United States. Fellow Canning Town boxer Steve Smith agreed to meet him at the Wonderland Français in Paris, where they fought a draw. Less than two weeks later, O'Keeffe was disqualified for a low blow in the fourth round against Geoff Thorne at the same venue.

Later in 1908, O'Keeffe toured Australia with Tommy Burns, who was recognised as world heavyweight champion. (Note: Professional boxing had no effective international governing body during this period. Championship recognition and the rules governing contests varied between countries.) The two trained together and invited the public to watch their sparring sessions.

His October 1908 contest against Ed Williams at the Cyclorama in Melbourne drew a large, disorderly crowd. According to The Age, spectators forced their way in without paying and crowded around the ring. The paper described the boxing as "unscientific", with exchanges that at times resembled wrestling. Williams concentrated on O'Keeffe's head, while O'Keeffe attacked the body and withstood repeated blows. At the end of the fifteenth round, O'Keeffe struck Williams after the gong, which he reportedly had not heard. Williams reacted angrily, and the police stopped the contest. The referee then awarded Williams a points victory. On Boxing Day, O'Keeffe served as Burns's second when Burns lost to Jack Johnson.

In February 1909, O'Keeffe was matched with Sam Keenan over twenty rounds at the Goldfields Athletic Club in Kalgoorlie, Western Australia. The local Sun cited his draw with Papke and reported that he had suffered one points defeat, against Williams, and drawn once in Australia. A December preview of his contest against Bill Turner, billed as the Tasmanian heavyweight champion, reported that Burns would second O'Keeffe at the Stadium.

In March 1910, O'Keeffe fought Mike Williams at the Stadium in Rushcutters Bay, Sydney. The Sydney Morning Herald reported that both men tired early and relied on stamina from the eighth round onwards. O'Keeffe pressed Williams at times, but Williams repeatedly rallied. In the eighteenth round, O'Keeffe's corner threw in the towel.

Before his departure, Sydney boxing figures organised a farewell testimonial at the Royal Edward Hotel in Redfern. Some seventy or eighty friends attended, and O'Keeffe received a framed illuminated address and a medal. A large crowd gathered at the wharf to see him leave for London aboard the R.M.S. Mooltan.

Interviewed at Fremantle during his journey to London, O'Keeffe blamed his disappointing form on the demands of training Burns: "While training Tommy Burns for his fights I have not been able to do myself justice. I have felt that I have had a tendency to go stale." He praised his reception in the eastern states and described Australia as "the grandest and finest country in the world". He hoped to return within a few years and settle there.

A 1915 account in the Sydney Sportsman reported that O'Keeffe had struggled financially towards the end of his stay. Alderman Lidbury of Rookwood (later Lidcombe), who had befriended him, lent him money towards his passage home. O'Keeffe repaid the loan with interest from his first winnings after returning to England.

=== Late career: 1911–1918 ===
In April 1911, O'Keeffe lost on points to Eddie McGoorty over fifteen rounds. In 1913, he lost on points to Private Jim Harris, but won their return bout on points over twenty rounds. He also beat Frank Mantell twice in seven days.

Georges Carpentier, whom O'Keeffe fought in a bout billed as the European heavyweight championship in 1914

O'Keeffe continued to fight above his natural weight. Before his challenge to Bombardier Billy Wells in 1913, Sporting Life reported that he was training at Upper Warlingham with other boxers. The paper also noted his experience as a sparring partner to Tommy Burns. He faced Wells on 4 August in a bout billed as the British heavyweight championship. Wells, who was considerably heavier, knocked him out in the fifteenth round.

On 19 January 1914, O'Keeffe fought Georges Carpentier in a contest billed as the heavyweight championship of Europe. Carpentier knocked him out in the second round. Afterwards, O'Keeffe told the Sheffield Daily Telegraph: "He was too big and strong for me."

On 23 February 1914, O'Keeffe beat Harry Reeve on points over twenty rounds to win the NSC's British middleweight title.

Bombardier Billy Wells (left) and Pat O'Keeffe boxing before King George V in the riding school at Albany Street Barracks, March 1914 (Illustrated London News)

In March, O'Keeffe and Wells gave a sparring exhibition before King George V at Albany Street Barracks. The King had dined with officers of the 2nd Life Guards before watching a programme of boxing, fencing and wrestling in the riding school. Nearly 1,500 officers and men attended. The Illustrated London News described Wells and O'Keeffe as England's reigning heavyweight and middleweight champions and reported that the King led the applause for their exhibition.

O'Keeffe defended his middleweight title against Nicol Simpson in April, winning on points. In May, he defeated Jim Sullivan in another defence, earning £650. In The Home of Boxing (1922), A. F. Bettinson and B. Bennison recalled that the Sullivan contest headed the NSC's bill on the eve of the Epsom Derby.

In March 1915, O'Keeffe knocked out heavyweight Joe Beckett in the eighth round. In May, he stopped Bandsman Blake in the thirteenth. Writing in Lloyd's Weekly Newspaper, 'Corinthian' described O'Keeffe as a methodical boxer. He used a straight left and a high guard to control distance, increasing his pace once he had assessed his opponent.

O'Keeffe met Sullivan again on 21 February 1916. Fellow boxer Jimmy Wilde described the contest as the most punishing he had ever witnessed. O'Keeffe won on points over twenty rounds.

On 22 May 1916, O'Keeffe lost his title and Lonsdale Belt to Blake at the NSC. The £500 contest went the full twenty rounds. The Sheffield Independent called it "not a good one", reporting that Blake received warnings for clinching and holding, and that the verdict surprised many spectators. The People credited O'Keeffe with better ring generalship, though there were few clean exchanges. Rather than match Blake's early pace, he waited in the centre of the ring to counter with his "never-failing left hand". In the fourteenth round, a right cross left Blake in trouble, but O'Keeffe lacked the strength to follow up. An old wound over his left eye reopened in the nineteenth. J. Frank Bradley of the Mirror of Life reported that O'Keeffe knocked Blake down for seven seconds in the twentieth round. While Blake was down, one of his seconds briefly put both feet inside the ring before withdrawing. Bradley described this as a foul, but Blake was awarded the decision.

On 28 January 1918, O'Keeffe fought his final professional bout, knocking out Blake in the second round at the NSC to win the Lonsdale Belt outright. Outright ownership also entitled him to an NSC pension of £1 a week for life from the age of fifty. The contest took place during a German air raid on London. Bettinson and Bennison recalled that bombs were "falling thick and fast" and suggested that Blake's nerves were "sorely affected" by the raid. According to Harding, O'Keeffe said before the fight: "If I get home safely tonight I don't think I will fight again."

At a subsequent presentation at the NSC, Bettinson congratulated O'Keeffe as both a sportsman and a man. O'Keeffe replied that winning the belt outright had been one of his ambitions and that he would now devote himself to charity and family life.

Looking back on O'Keeffe's career, Bettinson and Bennison gave him "pride of place" among the middleweights, "if only as a character". They described him as "never brilliant", but praised his knowledge of ringcraft and generosity.

== Military service during the First World War ==
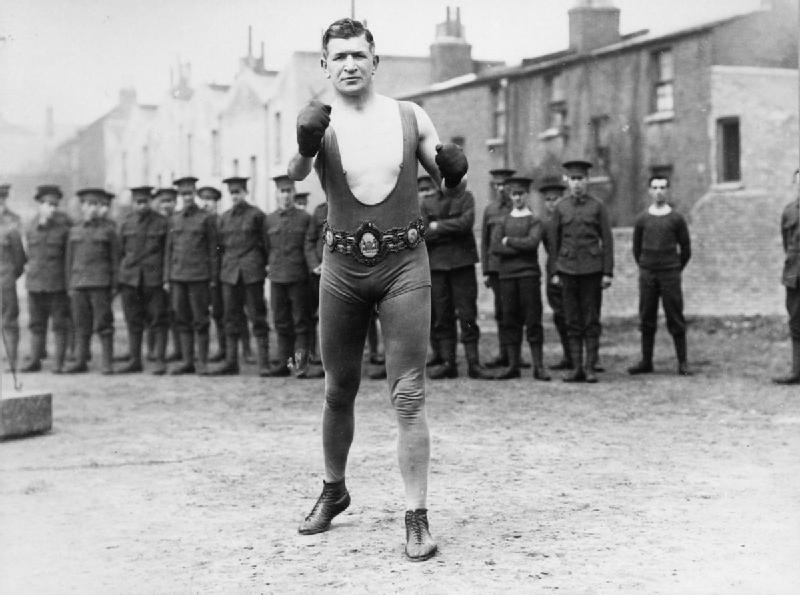
O'Keeffe instructing troops in boxing at Camberwell during the First World War

By 19 September 1914, O'Keeffe had enlisted in the 1st Surrey Rifles, the 21st (County of London) Battalion of the London Regiment. The following month, John Murray, editor of Boxing, listed him among the professional boxers who had joined the armed forces since the declaration of war. The list also included Dick Smith, Bandsman Blake and Johnny Basham.

During the war, the British Army formally incorporated sport into military life to improve fitness and morale and encourage recruitment. Boxing was particularly valued for developing controlled aggression and was often compared with bayonet training. Championship belt holders became recruiting figures, using their fame to encourage enlistment.

O'Keeffe recruited and gave physical training to new soldiers, and also served as a military policeman. An April 1915 report placed him near St Albans, wearing the initials "M.P." on his sleeve and still willing to accept boxing challenges if terms could be agreed. He rose from lance corporal to corporal, and was a sergeant by January 1918.

Army life suited him. In May 1915, The People described him as thriving at the regiment's base in Camberwell, where he had regular meals, a strict routine, sparring partners and room to train. He was also popular with the men. A Daily News profile that month described his preparations in a Surrey village for his bout with Bandsman Blake. He had become a familiar local figure, and children regularly gathered to watch him spar and use the gym equipment. O'Keeffe credited army routine with keeping him fit. When training recruits, he demonstrated the exercises himself rather than simply giving orders, a practice he said had "done me a world of good".

His work as a boxing instructor was remembered decades later by former soldier Frederick William Henry Holmes. In a 1985 Imperial War Museums oral history interview, Holmes recalled training under Sergeant Pat O'Keeffe for the Eastern Command and Army middleweight championships. O'Keeffe excused him from duties and supervised a strict diet while he prepared for the contests.

The authorities valued O'Keeffe's popularity and success as a recruiter. His manager, Fred Dartnell, later recalled his regular appeal to crowds: "Join the army and you'll be a champion like me!" His recruiting also supplied the sporting press with humorous stories. An account published in the Star Green 'un in July 1915 described an encounter on London Bridge:

... He was recently crossing London Bridge in company with his Sergeant-Major when from the other direction came a husky, healthy youth pushing a milk cart. Said the Sergeant-Major to the Corporal, "There's a likely-looking recruit for you, Pat; try him." O'Keeffe approached the youth, prodded him in the chest with his little stick, and said: "Say, don't you want to serve your King?" "Yus," answered the youth. "How many quarts will he want?" ...

— He wanted to serve, Star Green 'un, 17 July 1915

O'Keeffe also appeared at patriotic events. In May 1915, he took part in a Grand Patriotic Rally at the Imperial Hall in East Dulwich, organised by the exhibitor H. Langley Merritt. The programme combined war films with live appearances. Billed as a lance corporal of the 1st Surrey Rifles, O'Keeffe appeared both on screen and in person, accompanied by the regimental band.

At a fundraising exhibition in Ilford, he sparred with Billy Wells in aid of the Belgian Fund. The NSC referee Eugene Corri recalled that the exhibition almost became a genuine fight, prompting O'Keeffe to shout: "Stop it, Billy – I'm not the Kaiser!"

Pat O'Keeffe handing out fruit to wounded soldiers during a boat trip in the First World War

O'Keeffe helped organise outings and entertainments for wounded soldiers, including a boat trip on the Thames to lift their spirits. He also arranged a boxing entertainment at Chatham, with bouts involving both servicemen and civilians. In September 1915, he appeared alongside leading professionals, including Jimmy Wilde and Johnny Basham, in a Volunteer Training Corps athletic and boxing display at Villa Park in Birmingham. The event raised funds for wounded soldiers, the Red Cross and Volunteer Training Corps equipment.

His wartime boxing also reached cinema audiences. A Theatre Royal advertisement in the Limerick Leader promoted The Khaki Contest under the heading "The Great Fight Film", listing O'Keeffe against Lance Corporal Jim Sullivan. According to the writer Guy Deghy, NSC members became accustomed to referring to boxers by their service ranks, including "Sergeant O'Keeffe". Harding records that General Haig banned big-money fights involving serving soldiers, linking the decision to O'Keeffe's 1916 contest with Sullivan.

O'Keeffe regarded boxing as a way to maintain public morale and prevent social unrest. Harding quotes him as saying: "Give the public plenty of boxing and you'll have no Bolshevism!"

== Personal life ==
O'Keeffe married Isabella O'Neill in the West Ham registration district on 21 March 1917. They had two children: Eileen Isabel, born on 23 October 1917, and Patrick Alfred Leon, born on 13 December 1918.

In a 1929 article for the Sydney Referee, the Australian boxer Dave Smith recalled O'Keeffe's hospitality during a visit to London in 1912. Smith, who had twice beaten O'Keeffe in Australia, arrived aboard the Osterley during the dock strike. O'Keeffe met him at Tilbury, helped him through customs and settled him into the Imperial Hotel in Russell Square. He then took Smith round the newspaper offices to arrange press coverage and showed him the sights, including Petticoat Lane and the NSC. Smith also recalled that they boxed together at a benefit at the Ring in Blackfriars, and that the press described their bout as the best item on the bill.

During the Second World War, O'Keeffe's son Patrick served in the Royal Navy. He was aboard HMS Ark Royal when she was sunk off Gibraltar in November 1941, but survived and continued his naval career.

== Later life and post-boxing career ==
O'Keeffe, a former British boxing champion and Lonsdale Belt holder, leading exercises for cinema usherettes on the roof of the Regal Cinema near Marble Arch, London, in 1929

In 1918, the NSC announced the establishment of a boxing board dominated by its own members. A voting college of all past and present Lonsdale Belt holders selected O'Keeffe, Billy Wells and Jim Driscoll as the first professional boxers to serve on the board. Soon afterwards, they were given a share of responsibility for administering the Professional Boxers' Benevolent Fund. The board was reconstituted with broader representation in 1929, forming the modern British Boxing Board of Control.

A June 1919 profile reported that O'Keeffe had left the army that February and was living with his wife and two children. He had entered the licensed trade, owning or holding interests in several public houses, including premises in East Road, Hoxton, and was considering opening a gymnasium. He also wrote a regular boxing column for the Daily Herald. Although he had publicly announced his retirement, reports occasionally suggested that he might return to the ring. In February 1920, one reported that he had received an offer to fight in Paris. A newspaper sketch that October described him joking with spectators at an exhibition about the purses boxers were demanding compared with his own career earnings. It also remarked that he had put on weight and would have struggled to make his former fighting limit.

In February 1921, O'Keeffe helped organise relief for unemployed residents of Canning Town. The East End News and London Shipping Chronicle reported that the Mayor of West Ham attended and congratulated the organisers. In March 1922, while acting as timekeeper at a professional contest in Hoxton, O'Keeffe was struck by the gong and cut on the nose. He received treatment but declined to officiate for the rest of the evening. In June 1923, he was among the boxers presented to King George V during a royal visit to the Canning Town dock district. According to the Sunday Mirror, the King and Queen Mary watched bouts at the Malvern Mission Dockland Settlement and met O'Keeffe, Johnny Summers and Mike Honeyman.

Court reports in 1923 and 1925 describe O'Keeffe appearing as prosecutor in cases involving thefts and disturbances at licensed premises under his control in East Road, Hoxton. By the mid-1920s, financial difficulties connected with his work in the licensed trade had led to court proceedings. His move into the trade was common among retired boxers of his generation. The historian Matthew Taylor has noted that professional boxing in London offered little prospect of lasting social advancement. Most former champions retained ties to their working-class communities, and retired fighters facing financial difficulties were a familiar sight.

O'Keeffe also worked as a trainer. Reports from Paris in October 1925 stated that he had been engaged to teach boxing to British and French military units. By late 1926, he was managing the Olympia in Shoreditch, where boxing was due to be staged. In a letter to the Australian boxer Jim Barron, he said that he was anxious to return to Sydney and settle there.

He continued to referee contests and take part in charity exhibitions. At the Trowbridge Carnival in September 1927, he refereed a ten-round bantamweight contest before boxing a three-round exhibition with Wells. In 1928, he trained Lieutenant C. F. Capper, a leading amateur heavyweight, for the Amateur Boxing Association championships at the Royal Albert Hall. The following year, he led fitness sessions for cinema usherettes at the Regal Cinema near Marble Arch.

In 1936, O'Keeffe and fellow Lonsdale Belt holder Tancy Lee publicly complained that the NSC had stopped paying their pensions. O'Keeffe said he was not in urgent need of the money, but that Lee was in severe financial difficulty. The later NSC asked the Boxing Board to take responsibility for the old Covent Garden club's pension commitments, but the Board declined. Harding estimates that O'Keeffe lost £1,400 in unpaid pension payments.

O'Keeffe continued to attend public boxing events into the late 1930s. In 1938, he joined other former champions in a parade before the audience on the opening night of the NSC's new headquarters at the Hotel Splendide in Piccadilly. The 1939 Register recorded him as a publican at 3 Bartholomew Close in the City of London. This was the address of the Admiral Carter public house. Nearby Butchers' Hall had been damaged by a bomb dropped from a Zeppelin in 1915 and suffered further damage when a V-1 flying bomb landed in its courtyard in July 1944.

By May 1960, O'Keeffe and his wife were living at the Licensed Victuallers' Homes in Denham, Buckinghamshire. That month, the Croydon Times reported that both had been admitted to Mount Vernon Hospital for operations. O'Keeffe died there on 16 August 1960, aged 77. His obituary in The Times, published three days later, described him as a former British middleweight champion who had retired in 1918 and was the oldest surviving British boxing champion at the time of his death.

== Selected professional boxing record ==
O'Keeffe's professional boxing record can be summarised as follows:

131 fights	88 wins	25 losses
By knockout	36	9
By decision	52	16
Draws	7	
No contests	11	

Res.	Opponent	Type	Round	Date	Location	Notes
Win	(United Kingdom) Bandsman Jack Blake	KO	2 (20)	28 January 1918	(United Kingdom) NSC, Covent Garden, London	Regains British middleweight title
Loss	(United Kingdom) Bandsman Jack Blake	PTS	20	22 May 1916	(United Kingdom) NSC, Covent Garden, London	Loses British middleweight title
Win	(United Kingdom) Joe Beckett	KO	8	4 March 1915	(United Kingdom) West London Stadium, Marylebone, London	Beckett later became British heavyweight champion
Win	(United Kingdom) Jim Sullivan	PTS	20	25 May 1914	(United Kingdom) NSC, Covent Garden, London	Defends British middleweight title
Win	(United Kingdom) Harry Reeve	PTS	20	23 February 1914	(United Kingdom) NSC, Covent Garden, London	Wins British middleweight title
Loss	(France) Georges Carpentier	KO	2 (20)	19 January 1914	(France) Eldorado-Casino, Nice	European heavyweight title attempt
Loss	(United Kingdom) Bombardier Billy Wells	KO	15 (20)	4 August 1913	(United Kingdom) The Ring, Blackfriars Road, Southwark, London	British heavyweight title attempt
Loss	(United States) Eddie McGoorty	PTS	15	10 April 1911	(United Kingdom) NSC, Covent Garden, London	McGoorty later claimed world middleweight title
Loss	(Australia) Ed Williams	PTS	15	26 October 1908	(Australia) Cyclorama, Melbourne	Australian middleweight title attempt
Draw	(United States) Billy Papke	PTS	6	9 November 1907	(United States) National A.C., Philadelphia	Papke was later widely regarded as world middleweight champion
Loss	(United Kingdom) Tom Thomas	PTS	15	28 May 1906	(United Kingdom) NSC, Covent Garden, London	Loses middleweight championship of England
Win	(United Kingdom) Charlie Allum	KO	6 (15)	23 April 1906	(United Kingdom) NSC, Covent Garden, London	Defends middleweight championship of England
Win	(United Kingdom) Mike Crawley	PTS	15	19 March 1906	(United Kingdom) NSC, Covent Garden, London	Wins middleweight championship of England

== See also ==
- List of British middleweight boxing champions
- Pedlar Palmer

== Notes ==
Achievements
Earns Lonsdale Belt outright	British middleweight champion 28 January 1918 – retires	Vacant Title next held by Ted "Kid" Lewis
