= Glynarthen =

Village in Ceredigion, Wales

Coordinates: 52.109088°N 4.461970°W

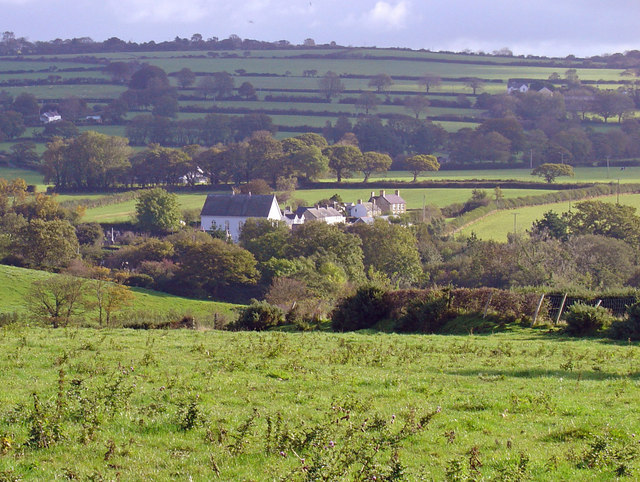
- Glynarthen in 2008

- Location within Ceredigion
- OS grid reference: SN315485
- Principal area: Ceredigion
- Preserved county: Dyfed
- Country: Wales
- Sovereign state: United Kingdom
- Post town: Llandysul
- Postcode district: SA44
- Police: Dyfed-Powys
- Fire: Mid and West Wales
- Ambulance: Welsh
- UK Parliament: Ceredigion Preseli
- Senedd Cymru – Welsh Parliament: Ceredigion

Glynarthen is a village located in Ceredigion, Wales. It is part of the community of Penbryn, along with the neighbouring villages of Brynhoffnant, Sarnau and Tan-y-groes.

Ysgol Glynarthen School was a primary school situated in the village. It was built in 1901 and closed in 2012, with its pupils then attending Ysgol T Llew Jones School in nearby Brynhoffnant.

The school's unison party won their category in the Urdd Gobaith Cymru Eisteddfod in the Cardiff Millennium Centre in May 2009.

There is a mother chapel in the village which hosts the annual Easter Cymanfa. There is also an active Sunday school.
