= Andrew Horrall =

Historian and archivist

Andrew Horrall is a historian and archivist with interests in the 19th and 20th century British popular culture. He holds a B.A. from Bishop's University and Ph.D. from the University of Cambridge.

As of 2026 he is senior archivist at Library and Archives Canada and adjunct professor at the Carleton University.

== Books ==
- 2025: Entertaining the empire. London music hall and the export of Britishness, Manchester University Press
  From the editor's foreword: "The territorial expansion of the British Empire to the four corners of the earth was accompanied by the spread of the dominant entertainment form from the home front – the music hall. Drawing extensively on the increasingly digitised colonial press, Andrew Horrall has been able to trace the pattern and effects of the expansion of the music hall until it became as much the popular culture of the empire as it was of Britain."
- 2017: Inventing the Cave Man: From Darwin to the Flintstones Manchester University Press

An evolution of the image of a caveman in public perception, up to the modern pop-culture image: "bare-footed, wild-haired and bearded, with rough animal-hide clothes half-covering his body and a stout wooden club in his hand", arguing that its roots lie in the mid-19th century "gorilla cartoons".

- 2010: Bringing Art to Life: a Biography of Alan Jarvis
- 2001: Horrall, Andrew (2001). Popular Culture in London c.1890–1918: The Transformation of Entertainment. Manchester University Press. ISBN 0-7190-5783-3.

A rework of Horrall's P.D. thesis on the role of London's music hall in shaping the mass entertinment industry in late-Victorian and Edwardian London.

== Awards ==
2010: Ottawa Book Award for Bringing Art to Life
