= List of British heavyweight boxing champions =

List of British heavyweight boxing champions is a table showing the boxers who have won the British heavyweight title, which has been sanctioned by the National Sporting Club since 1891, and the British Boxing Board of Control (BBBoC) since 1929.

A champion will often voluntarily relinquish the title in order to fight for a higher-ranked championship, such as the world or European. Where the date on which a champion relinquished the title is unclear, the date of the last BBBoC sanctioned fight is shown.

^{r} – Champion relinquished title
^{s} – Champion stripped of title

| Name | Duration of reign | Defences |
|---|---|---|
| Jack Palmer | 18 December 1905 – 29 October 1906 | 0 |
| Gunner Moir | 29 October 1906 – 19 April 1909 | 1 |
| William Hague | 19 April 1909 – 24 April 1911 | 0 |
| Bombardier Billy Wells | 24 April 1911 – 27 February 1919 | 13 |
| Joe Beckett | 27 February 1919^{s} | 0 |
| Frank Goddard | 26 May 1919 – 17 June 1919 | 0 |
| Joe Beckett | 17 June 1919 – 14 May 1923^{r} | 4 |
| Frank Goddard | 21 November 1923 – 18 March 1926 | 1 |
| Phil Scott | 18 March 1926 – 30 April 1926^{r} | 1 |
| Reggie Meen | 16 November 1931 – 12 July 1932 | 0 |
| Jack Petersen | 12 July 1932 – 30 November 1933 | 2 |
| Len Harvey | 30 November 1933 – 4 June 1934 | 0 |
| Jack Petersen | 4 June 1934 – 17 August 1936 | 3 |
| Ben Foord | 17 August 1936 – 15 March 1937 | 0 |
| Tommy Farr | 15 March 1937^{r} | 0 |
| Len Harvey | 1 December 1938^{r} | 0 |
| Jack London | 15 September 1944 – 17 July 1945 | 0 |
| Bruce Woodcock | 17 July 1945 – 14 November 1950 | 1 |
| Jack Gardner | 14 November 1950 – 11 March 1952 | 0 |
| Johnny Williams | 11 March 1952 – 12 May 1953 | 0 |
| Don Cockell | 12 May 1953^{r} | 0 |
| Joe Erskine | 27 August 1956 – 3 June 1958 | 1 |
| Brian London | 3 June 1958 – 12 January 1959 | 0 |
| Henry Cooper | 12 January 1959 – 7 November 1967^{r} | 8 |
| Jack Bodell | 13 October 1969 – 24 March 1970 | 0 |
| Henry Cooper | 24 March 1970 – 16 March 1971 | 0 |
| Joe Bugner | 16 March 1971 – 27 September 1971 | 0 |
| Jack Bodell | 27 September 1971 – 27 June 1972 | 0 |
| Danny McAlinden | 27 June 1972 – 13 January 1975 | 0 |
| Bunny Johnson | 13 January 1975 – 30 September 1975 | 0 |
| Richard Dunn | 30 September 1975 – 12 October 1976 | 1 |
| Joe Bugner | 12 October 1976^{r} | 0 |
| John L. Gardner | 24 October 1978 – 26 June 1979^{r} | 1 |
| Gordon Ferris | 30 March 1981 – 12 October 1981 | 0 |
| Neville Meade | 12 October 1981 – 22 September 1983 | 0 |
| David Pearce | 22 September 1983^{r} | 0 |
| Hughroy Currie | 18 September 1985 – 12 April 1986 | 0 |
| Horace Notice | 12 April 1986 – 9 March 1988^{r} | 4 |
| Gary Mason | 18 January 1989 – 6 March 1991 | 1 |
| Lennox Lewis | 6 March 1991 – 30 April 1992^{r} | 2 |
| Herbie Hide | 27 February 1993^{r} | 0 |
| James Oyebola | 19 November 1994 – 27 October 1995 | 0 |
| Scott Welch | 27 October 1995^{r} | 0 |
| Julius Francis | 27 September 1997 – 13 March 2000 | 3 |
| Mike Holden | 13 March 2000^{r} | 0 |
| Danny Williams | 21 October 2000 – 24 January 2004 | 4 |
| Michael Sprott | 24 January 2004 – 24 April 2004 | 0 |
| Matt Skelton | 24 April 2004 – 10 December 2005^{r} | 3 |
| Scott Gammer | 16 June 2006 – 2 March 2007 | 1 |
| Danny Williams | 2 March 2007 – 15 May 2010 | 2 |
| Derek Chisora | 15 May 2010 – 23 July 2011 | 1 |
| Tyson Fury | 23 July 2011 – 8 February 2012^{r} | 0 |
| David Price | 19 May 2012 – 5 December 2013^{r} | 2 |
| Tyson Fury | 30 November 2014 – 28 November 2015^{r} | 0 |
| Anthony Joshua | 12 December 2015 – 9 April 2016^{r} | 0 |
| Dillian Whyte | 7 October 2016 – 12 January 2017^{r} | 0 |
| Sam Sexton | 6 October 2017 – 12 May 2018 | 0 |
| Hughie Fury | 12 May 2018 – 22 March 2019^{r} | 0 |
| Daniel Dubois | 13 July 2019 – 28 November 2020 | 0 |
| Joe Joyce | 28 November 2020 – 15 July 2022^{r} | 0 |
| Fabio Wardley | 26 November 2022 – 14 March 2025^{r} | 3 |
| David Adeleye | 5 April 2025 – July 2025^{r} | 0 |
| Jeamie Tshikeva | 29 November 2025 – 11 April 2026 | 0 |
| Richard Riakporhe | 11 April 2026 – present | 0 |

== See also ==
- List of British cruiserweight boxing champions
- List of British light-heavyweight boxing champions
- List of British super-middleweight boxing champions
- List of British middleweight boxing champions
- List of British light-middleweight boxing champions
- List of British welterweight boxing champions
- List of British light-welterweight boxing champions
- List of British lightweight boxing champions
- List of British super-featherweight boxing champions
- List of British featherweight boxing champions
- List of British super-bantamweight boxing champions
- List of British bantamweight boxing champions
- List of British super-flyweight boxing champions
- List of British flyweight boxing champions
- List of British world boxing champions
