= Matthew Curran =

Irish boxer

Matthew 'Nutty' Curran
Personal information
- Nicknames: 'Nutty', 'One Punch Nutty'
- Nationality: Irish
- Born: Matthew Curran; 1882 Lisdeen, Kilkee, Ireland
- Died: 1938 (aged 56)
- Height: 5 ft 10 1/2 in (1.79 m)
- Weight: Heavyweight

Boxing career

Boxing record
- Total fights: 86
- Wins: 43 (KO 36)
- Losses: 35 (KO 8)
- Draws: 3
- No contests: 5

Petty officer Matthew 'Nutty' Curran (1882 – 1938) was an Irish professional heavyweight boxer from 1900 to 1930. His fighting name, "Nutty", was derived from the English slang term for someone who is mentally unbalanced. Curran won the Irish heavyweight title, British Empire heavyweight title, and vied for the British Boxing Board of Control British heavyweight title. British heavyweight title bouts featuring Curran were neither recognized by the National Sporting Club (NSC) at the time, nor retroactively by the British Boxing Board of Control, because the bouts did not take place on National Sporting Club premises. His professional fighting weight varied throughout his career from 178 lb. (81 kg) to 199 lb. (90.3 kg).

== Boxing career ==
Matthew 'Nutty' Curran's first professional boxing bout was a disqualification defeat by Seaman Jim McDonald at Royal Naval Barracks Gymnasium, Devonport, Devon, in October 1908.

Other notable fight results included:

- Points defeat by James Doran for the Royal Navy Heavyweight Title
- Knockout victory over Jack Ripper for the Irish heavyweight title at Ancient Concert Rooms, Dublin on 20 October 1909
- Knockout victory over James William 'Bill' "Iron" Hague for the British heavyweight title (not recognized by the National Sporting Club (NSC)
- Knockout victory over Fred Drummond defending the British heavyweight title
- Disqualification victory over 'Ex Gunner' James Moir defending the British heavyweight title
- Knockout victory over Seaman Grant defending the British heavyweight title
- Knockout victory over Jem Roche defending the Irish heavyweight title at Empire Theatre, Dublin on 18 August 1910
- Knockout victory over Peter Rice defending the British heavyweight title
- No contest and a knockout victory over Jewey Smith defending the British heavyweight title
- Retirement victory over Gunner Harry Hewitt defending the British heavyweight title
- Disqualification victory over Bill Lang (Australia) for the vacant British Empire heavyweight title
- No contest with Fred Storbeck (South Africa) defending the British Empire heavyweight title
- Knockout victory over Herbert Sinnott (Ireland/Australia) defending the British Empire heavyweight title
- Draw against George Gunther at Cirque de Paris on 25 November 1911. The bout was temporarily halted in the 16th round when the elastic waistband in Curran's shorts broke
- Disqualification defeat by Fred Storbeck (South Africa) defending the British Empire heavyweight title
- Points defeat by both Charles Kid McCoy and George Gunther at Palais de la Jetée, Nice on 21 February 1912 and 27 February 1912. Curran knocked down McCoy near the edge of the ring in the 12th round. McCoy then drank brandy and soda that had been placed on the edge of the canvas, beat the count, and went on to win the fight by points
- Knockout victory over 'Ex Gunner' James Moir defending the British heavyweight title
- Technical Knockout victory over Herbert Sinnott defending the Irish heavyweight title
- Disqualification defeat by Dan Voyles defending the Irish heavyweight title
- Two points defeat by Bill Lang at Sydney Stadium on 3 May 1913 and 16 August 1913
- Disqualification defeat by Pat Doran at Melbourne Athletic Pavilion, Melbourne on 25 August 1913
- Knockout defeat by Sam Langford at Luna Park, Paris on 24 January 1914
- Technical knockout defeat by Con O'Kelly for the vacant Irish heavyweight title
- Knockout defeat by Bombardier Billy Wells for the British Boxing Board of Control British heavyweight title at Cosmopolitan Gymnasium, Plymouth on 31 March 1916

Matthew Curran travelled to Australia for his final professional boxing bout: a retirement defeat by Colin Bell at Capitol Theatre, Sydney, Australia, on 29 August 1921.
