= Bombardier Billy Wells =

British professional boxer (1887–1967)

- Wells training in Rye, New York, before his 1912 contest with Al Palzer

Personal information
- Nickname: Bombardier
- Born: William Thomas Wells; 31 August 1887 St George in the East, London, England
- Died: 11 June 1967 (aged 79) Ealing, London, England
- Height: 6 ft 3 in (1.91 m)

Boxing career
- Weight class: heavyweight
- Stance: Orthodox

Boxing record
- Total fights: 48
- Wins: 37
- Win by KO: 34
- Losses: 11

William Thomas Wells (31 August 1887 – 11 June 1967), known as Bombardier Billy Wells, was an English heavyweight boxer who competed professionally from 1910 to 1925. The National Sporting Club (NSC) recognised him as British heavyweight champion from 1911 to 1919. He became the first holder of the heavyweight Lonsdale Belt and made fourteen defences of the NSC title.

Wells's proposed contest with the world heavyweight champion Jack Johnson in 1911 was prohibited after a public campaign and government intervention. In 1913, he was twice knocked out by Georges Carpentier. During the First World War, he returned to the army and served in France as a physical-training and bayonet instructor. After demobilisation, he resumed his professional career, losing to Joe Beckett in 1919. He continued boxing until 1925.

The historian Jack Williams described Wells as the most popular British sports star of the 1910s, whose appeal extended beyond boxing's established male working-class following to women and middle-class spectators. Wells also published two boxing books and appeared on screen between 1913 and 1957. He was one of several men filmed striking the gong in the trademark sequence shown before Rank films.

== Early life and army service ==
Wells was born on 31 August 1887 at 250 Cable Street in east London. He was baptised at St George in the East on 25 September that year. His parents were William Thomas Wells, a musician, and Emily Rhoda Wells, formerly Farrier. They had nine children, of whom Wells was the eldest of five boys. The 1891 census recorded him, aged three, living with his parents and younger brother Alfred in St George in the East. By 1901, the family had moved to Mile End Old Town, where his father was listed as a music-hall musician.

Wells entered Ratcliff Broad Street School in Shadwell on 9 January 1899. He and Alfred took part in a gymnastics display at Broad Street Boys' Club in 1901, and their father taught music there. The historian Stan Shipley suggests that an instructor named Chambers gave Wells his first boxing lessons at the club. Wells began boxing for the club in his final year at school and continued until he joined the army. After leaving school, he worked as a messenger for the Eastern Telegraph Company, his first job.

He enlisted in the Royal Garrison Artillery in the summer of 1906. After his first few months at a depot in Dover, his company was sent to north-western India, where he joined the 6th Mountain Battery at Rawalpindi. He began boxing for the army after the battery marched to Quetta, winning both the novice and open competitions at the divisional boxing tournament.

At Poona in March 1909, Wells beat three opponents to win the All-India heavyweight championship. Before the next championships at Lucknow, he spent a month training with Jim Maloney, a professional boxer employed to train soldiers. Wells won three further contests at Lucknow. During his service in India, he was promoted to bombardier.

On Maloney's advice, Wells bought his discharge from the army for £21 (1910) (equivalent to £2,919 or US$3,730.76 in 2024). He left India ahead of Maloney and arrived at Southampton aboard the troopship Passy in April 1910. Maloney later returned to London and became his manager.

== Professional boxing career ==
=== British title ===
After returning to England in 1910, Wells boxed an exhibition with Gunner Joe Mills at a gentlemen's club in London's West End. That summer, he knocked out Gunner McMurray at the army garrison in Shoeburyness and Corporal Brown in the third round at Wonderland in Whitechapel. After the Brown bout, Wells gave twice-nightly sparring exhibitions at the Euston Palace and Canterbury music halls.

According to John Harding, Wells's contract with the promoter Hugh D. McIntosh guaranteed him top-of-the-bill status after no more than a dozen contests. McIntosh used King's Hall in Southwark as his base while preparing to stage contests at Olympia. At King's Hall, Wells stopped Sergeant Sunshine in six rounds, Dan Voyles in ten and Seaman Fred Parsons in a little over two minutes. He suffered his first professional defeat in January 1911, when Gunner Moir knocked him out in the third round at Olympia. McIntosh billed the contest as the heavyweight championship of Great Britain. Harding attributes most of the damage to Moir's body punches.

The historian Andrew Horrall connects Wells's rise with the growing prominence of boxers as music-hall celebrities. His defeat by Moir was filmed, and his stage appearances promoted him as a future champion. During the series of London contests leading up to his Lonsdale Belt victory, Wells trained with a bodybuilder and received extensive coverage in the boxing and athletic press.

In March, Wells outpointed Dan "Porky" Flynn over twenty rounds. Shipley regards this victory as establishing his claim to challenge Iron Hague. The National Sporting Club (NSC) offered Wells a contest against Hague for the first heavyweight Lonsdale Belt. Harding notes that the purse was among the smallest offered for a belt contest, below that for the bantamweight title and less than the money put up as side stakes.

On 24 April 1911, Wells knocked Hague out in the sixth round at the NSC in Covent Garden, winning the club's British heavyweight title and becoming the first holder of the heavyweight Lonsdale Belt. (Note: Shipley's bout table gives the date as 24 April 1911. Bettinson and Bennison place the contest towards the end of February.) (Note: Professional boxing was not governed by a single international authority during Wells's career. The NSC systematised British championships through the Lonsdale Belt from 1909, but rules, weight divisions and methods of allocating championships continued to differ between countries. The International Boxing Union sought to become a world federation, but its ambitions were gradually restricted to Europe.) A. F. Bettinson and B. Bennison recorded that Hague went down three times in the final round. Afterwards, Lord Lonsdale and the assembled members congratulated Wells.

=== Proposed Jack Johnson contest ===
The promoter James White arranged for Wells to meet Jack Johnson at the Empress Hall, Earl's Court, on 2 October 1911. Advertised as a world heavyweight championship contest, the bout was scheduled for twenty three-minute rounds, with a purse of £8,000 (1911) (equivalent to £1.11 million or US$1.42 million in 2024). It formed part of the international search for a "white hope" to defeat Johnson, the first black world heavyweight champion.

The Baptist minister Frederick Brotherton Meyer and Charles Brown of the National Free Church Council led a public campaign against the bout. They condemned it as brutal and objected to its racial implications. The campaign drew support from churchmen, local authorities, politicians and sporting figures. The London County Council warned the owners of Earl's Court that staging the contest could jeopardise the renewal of the venue's licence.

The dispute also concerned the unsettled legal status of professional boxing. The historian Matthew Taylor argues that the emphasis on race in accounts of the proposed fight has sometimes obscured the related legal and social objections to commercial prizefighting. The Home Office deemed the contest illegal, describing it as a breach of the peace and contrary to the interests of the nation and empire. On 28 September, the freeholders of Earl's Court obtained a High Court injunction preventing the contest under the terms of the venue's lease. White agreed not to stage it in the British Isles or other British territories, after which the Home Office dropped its proceedings.

The historian Theresa Runstedtler argues that the Wells–Johnson case provided a precedent for banning later interracial contests. She also links it to the development of the colour bar that excluded non-white boxers from British title contests until 1947.

=== Championship years ===
In December 1911, Wells met the South African boxer Fred Storbeck at the NSC in a contest billed for the Empire heavyweight title. The prize money was £1,250 (1911) (equivalent to £173,750 or US$222,068.97 in 2024), with side stakes of £500 (1911) (equivalent to £69,500 or US$88,800 in 2024). Storbeck shook Wells in the fifth round, but Wells recovered and knocked him out in the eleventh.

In May 1912, Wells travelled to New York with Maloney and his brother Sid. He lost to Al Palzer at Madison Square Garden, then knocked out Tom Kennedy in eight rounds three weeks later. He returned to the United States with his wife in 1913. A proposed bout with Luther McCarty failed to materialise, and he instead faced Gunboat Smith, who knocked him out in the second round at Madison Square Garden.

Wells's first contest with Georges Carpentier at Ghent, 1 June 1913

Wells met Georges Carpentier twice in 1913. He was the favourite for their first contest, at Ghent on 1 June, although Carpentier had fought 27 times in 1911–1912 compared with Wells's seven. Carpentier knocked him out in the fourth round. Bettinson and Bennison later argued that Wells's shortcomings had contributed more to Carpentier's reputation in Britain than the Frenchman's own qualities. Before their return contest, Wells stopped Packey Mahoney, Pat O'Keeffe and Gunner Moir in a ten-week period. The three bouts lasted a total of 33 rounds.

The return took place at the NSC on 8 December for the European heavyweight championship, with Eugene Corri as referee. Wells trained at Selsey Bill, where O'Keeffe was among his assistants. Shipley suggests that he may have been fitter and better trained than ever before. Carpentier moved inside Wells's long reach and attacked his body, knocking him out after 73 seconds. The author Kasia Boddy discusses the defeat as part of a debate about British and French boxing styles.

Bettinson and Bennison wrote that the return had been awaited with "feverish impatience", but judged Wells "a beaten man before hostilities began". Wells's later accounts placed different emphasis on his state of mind. In 1914, he recalled expecting Carpentier to rush him and being unsettled when the Frenchman instead waited calmly in the centre of the ring. In 1920, he described being nervous before the contest.

On 16 March 1914, Wells and O'Keeffe boxed before King George V at a 2nd Life Guards tournament in the riding school at Albany Street Barracks. Nearly 1,500 officers and men attended. The Times stated that there was no record of a king of England having previously been present at the ringside. On 30 June, Wells knocked out Colin Bell in the second round at Olympia in a contest billed for the British Empire championship. Charles B. Cochran promoted the event, for which 10,000 seats were available, as "People's Night".

Wells was the NSC's recognised British heavyweight champion from 1911 to 1919 and made fourteen title defences. According to Harding, by the outbreak of war he had held the title for the required three years and beaten all credible opponents. The NSC offered him the Lonsdale Belt outright on the strength of his victories in 1911 and 1913, but Wells insisted on securing ownership in the ring. He did so in December 1916 by stopping Dan Voyles in two rounds. Writing in 1922, Bettinson and Bennison noted that the heavyweight Lonsdale Belt had been contested only four times, with Wells winning three of those contests. They attributed the small number to a shortage of able heavyweights and the financial demands of the division's leading men.

== First World War service ==
Wells was criticised by the press for continuing to box while Carpentier served in the French air force. His brother Alfred, a Rifle Brigade reservist serving with the British Expeditionary Force, was killed on 23 September 1914, aged 25. Wells did not re-enlist until May 1915. Shipley notes that his explanations for the delay changed, but centred on supporting his wife, child, mother and two teenage brothers, and the boxing income he would lose by enlisting.

Wells also took part in wartime charity events. At Ilford, he sparred with O'Keeffe in aid of the Belgian Fund. Corri recalled that the exhibition came close to a genuine fight, prompting O'Keeffe to shout, "Stop it, Billy – I'm not the Kaiser!"

In March 1915, Frank Moran knocked Wells out in the tenth round at the London Opera House. Wells re-enlisted in May while preparing to face Dick Smith at the end of the month. He was promoted to sergeant before Christmas and boxed four times in 1916.

Percy Webb, who trained with the 7th (Reserve) Battalion of the Dorsetshire Regiment at Bovington Camp in 1916, recalled Wells's work as a gymnastic instructor in a 1975 Imperial War Museums oral history interview. Wells took the recruits for physical training, including early-morning runs of four or five miles around the camp. Webb described him as "very regimental": one of the men off parade, but strict on it. He remembered seeing Wells order four men to throw a reluctant recruit over the vaulting horse. Webb was himself put into the ring against a man he knew to be an experienced boxer. When the first punch bloodied Webb's nose, Wells immediately stopped the bout.

Wells went to France in 1917 and did not box professionally again until after the armistice. He served on the Physical Training and Bayonet Fighting Staff and was attached to an Army headquarters. Shipley suggests that his duties included visiting camps to organise bayonet training and physical education, discussing recreation with officers and non-commissioned officers, and refereeing boxing tournaments. Wells also served as an instructor at St Pol, where the Physical Training and Bayonet School had moved in early 1917. The school trained officers and non-commissioned officers to teach physical training and bayonet fighting in their own units. That year, he entered the 2nd Division Boxing Tournament, where Private Fraser described him as "skilful" but "not rugged enough".

Another soldier who received boxing lessons from Wells was Joseph Pickard, a private in the Northumberland Fusiliers. Pickard was wounded in the leg in October 1917 and convalesced at Trouville. In a 1986 Imperial War Museums oral history interview, he recalled being offered a choice between a route march and a boxing lesson. He chose boxing, and Wells showed the men how to defend themselves. Pickard described him as "one of the nicest fellas" he had met.

In June 1918, a British Boxing Board of Control was announced from the NSC's premises. A voting college of all past and present Lonsdale Belt holders selected Wells, Jim Driscoll and O'Keeffe as the first professionals to serve on the board. The three also shared responsibility for administering the newly established Professional Boxers' Benevolent Fund, which assisted former professionals who had fallen on hard times.

By December 1918, Wells had reached the rank of company sergeant major. That month, the Imperial Services Boxing Association staged the British Empire and American Services Boxing Tournament over two days at the Royal Albert Hall. Although the entrants were professionals, the contests were limited to three rounds and decided by three judges. Wells outpointed Leading Seaman Powell, Private Eddie McGoorty and Sergeant Joe Beckett to win the heavyweight competition. The British Army team won the King's Trophy. George V was unable to attend, so Prince Albert presented the trophy on his behalf and conveyed a message from him. The Journal reported that this was the first time George V had accorded boxing his patronage.

== Later career and retirement ==
After demobilisation, Wells resumed his professional career, but Beckett knocked him out in the fifth round at Holborn Stadium on 27 February 1919. Shipley dates the end of Wells's British championship reign to this defeat, although the NSC initially refused to recognise Beckett because the title had changed hands outside Covent Garden. The club instead matched Frank Goddard with Jack Curphey for its version of the championship. (Note: Accounts of the NSC's response differ. Harding writes that the club declared the title vacant and matched Goddard with Curphey for a new belt. Guy Deghy states that the NSC continued to recognise Wells as champion even after Beckett had defeated him twice. Bettinson and Bennison wrote that Beckett, having beaten Wells, "deemed a Lonsdale Belt beneath his dignity; there was not enough money in it for him".)

Wells returned after eight months out of the ring, knocking out Curphey within five minutes at Holborn Stadium in October 1919. The following month, he defeated Arthur Townley at the same venue when Townley's corner threw in the towel in the ninth round. Cochran promoted both contests. In early 1920, Wells knocked out Harry Reeve in the fourth round at the Canterbury Music Hall and defeated Paul Journée in thirteen rounds at the Royal Albert Hall. He then knocked out Eddie McGoorty after sixteen rounds at Holborn Stadium.

On 10 May 1920, Wells faced Beckett again at Olympia in a contest promoted by Cochran as being for the heavyweight title. Beckett knocked him out in the third round. That September, Wells travelled to France and stopped Journée at Deauville during a four-day Anglo-French tournament. He was due to meet Battling Levinsky at the Royal Albert Hall in January 1921, but the contest was cancelled after Levinsky arrived with his arm in a sling following a training injury.

Wells fought three times in 1922. He stopped the Australian Albert Lloyd at the NSC in April, but Frank Goddard knocked him out in the sixth round at Crystal Palace in May. In October, Jack Bloomfield also knocked him out in the sixth round, at the Royal Albert Hall. Wells retired after the Bloomfield defeat, though he was later reported to be training at the NSC gymnasium, where he sparred with and advised the future British heavyweight champion Phil Scott. In January 1924, Corri reported that Wells was opening a boxing school and planned to send lessons by post to pupils unable to attend in person.

Wells made another comeback in November 1924, knocking out Charlie Penwill in the second round at Hoxton Baths. On 15 December, he defeated Gunner Bennett at Liverpool Olympia when Bennett's seconds threw in the towel. (Note: Shipley's bout table records Bennett as retired in the ninth round, while his narrative places the stoppage halfway through the scheduled twenty rounds.) In January 1925, Wells beat Soldier Horace Jones by disqualification in the sixth round at the Brighton Dome. His final professional boxing contest took place on 30 April, when Jack Stanley knocked him out in the third round at the Royal Albert Hall.

Thirteen years later, in December 1938, Wells returned to the ring at Earls Court for a mixed-rules contest against the wrestler Chick Knight. Wells wore boxing gloves and was not allowed to wrestle; Knight could wrestle but was barred from punching. Knight was disqualified for punching after two minutes and fourteen seconds. Pathé News filmed the contest for cinema exhibition. In 1966, Wells was guest of honour at the NSC.

== Boxing style ==
Wells stood 6 ft 3 in (1.91 m) tall and boxed in an orthodox stance. His reach and straight left were his best-known assets. Shipley describes how he could finish a contest with a right hand following one or two left leads, although his vulnerability against powerful opponents made his bouts unpredictable.

Wells had a considerable size advantage over Carpentier, who was three and a half inches shorter and more than a stone lighter according to Boddy. (Note: Shipley describes the difference as several inches in height and a stone in weight.) Carpentier overcame that advantage by getting inside Wells's reach and attacking his body. The historian Jack Williams considered Wells fast and clever for a heavyweight and did not question his courage. He nevertheless judged that Wells lacked the punching power to beat the strongest opponents and was vulnerable to sustained body attacks. Bettinson and Bennison offered a different explanation. They regarded Wells as both a skilled boxer and a hard puncher, attributing his failures to temperament and rejecting the suggestion that he had a physical weakness around the waist.

The writer Bohun Lynch, quoted by Boddy, considered Wells a scientific boxer who did not really like fighting. Harding quotes Bettinson's description of him in The Home of Boxing as "a pleasing young man" who was "hopelessly out of court in any crucial contest".

== Promotion and public image ==
Wells giving a boxing lesson to two Russian performers at the Alhambra music hall in Paris, January 1923

Williams describes Wells as the most popular British sports star of the 1910s, attributing his appeal to his physique, appearance, personable manner and modesty. He also credits Maloney's skill in presenting Wells to the public as a model husband and home-loving man. Shipley makes an even broader comparison, writing that no contemporary footballer or cricketer approached Wells in popularity, and no actor or author was half so well known.

Portraits and action photographs in illustrated newspapers made Wells recognisable to people who had never seen him box. By 1913, Boddy argues, his work as a boxer and music-hall performer was being promoted through an adopted public-school image. Shipley describes Wells and Carpentier as being presented to the public as respectable husbands and sons. Wells endorsed products, including Guy's Tonic, but guarded his private life closely. In Shipley's account, he made little attempt to promote himself as a personality outside his work.

Williams considers Wells the first British professional boxing champion whose appeal extended beyond the male working class to women and middle-class spectators. For the Wells–Bell contest, Cochran advertised "People's Night", offering 10,000 reserved seats at prices ranging from five shillings to five guineas. Tickets could be bought through West End offices and agencies or booked by telephone. Shipley interprets the promotion as an attempt to attract both established boxing supporters and newcomers, including salaried workers. Although women formed only a small part of the audience in his account, he suggests that their acceptance of boxing as respectable recreation helped encourage men to attend.

Wells's defeats by Carpentier prompted debate about national boxing styles. After the second contest, The Times argued that British boxers needed to learn in-fighting to compete with "Americanized experts" such as Carpentier. In January 1914, G. K. Chesterton called it "the contest that proves nothing", rejecting the idea that nations could be judged by their chosen specialists. Other references to Wells appeared in music-hall comedy and wartime slang. The comedian Harry Weldon used the catchphrase "tell 'em what I did to Colin Bell" after Wells's victory over Bell. During the First World War, unreliable British shells were nicknamed "Billy Wells".

Bettinson and Bennison believed that Wells's defeats contributed as much to his popularity as his victories. Shipley also argues that his results alone cannot explain his lasting popularity. He places greater emphasis on the growth of professional boxing before the war and on Wells's heavyweight status, demeanour and appearance.

== Writing and publications ==
Wells's boxing manual Modern Boxing, published in 1911, went through eight editions. His books were:

- Modern Boxing: A Practical Guide to Present-Day Methods (Ewart, Seymour & Co., 1911).
- Physical Energy: Showing How Physical and Mental Energy May Be Developed by Means of the Practice of Boxing (Werner Laurie, undated, possibly 1923).

Shipley also lists an eight-page pamphlet, How a Boxer should Train, which he found in the British Library catalogue. He had not seen a copy, and the catalogue marked it as destroyed.

Wells wrote serialised articles for several periodicals. One series appeared in Answers from 23 May to 27 June 1914, and another in Lloyd's Sunday News from 18 April to 16 May 1920. His "My Life and my Fights" ran across 21 issues of Thomson's Weekly News in 1920, totalling about 50,000 words.

== Film and screen work ==
The British Film Institute lists Wells's screen credits from 1913 to 1957. An advertisement for the 1916 film Kent, the Fighting Man promoted it under Wells's name, emphasising its boxing scenes and "touch" of real life. In October 1918, Pictures and Picturegoer reported that Wells and Judd Green were filming at the Tiger Film Company's studio with the producer A. E. Coleby. It named the production as The Straight Game. The following February, the magazine described him as the star of Tiger's The Great Game and reported that he had been offered a large salary to act in films in the United States.

In 1934, Wells appeared as a blacksmith in the filmed trademark of Hammer Productions, striking a red-hot iron on an anvil. He also appeared in King of the Damned. In January 1935, a Picturegoer columnist reported that Wells was working as a crowd performer in military costume, but doubted that any change of dress could disguise him. In February 1939, the magazine named him among the announced cast of There Ain't No Justice and reported that he had taken part in a stage fight in a play by Sebastian Shaw. In 1945, a Picturegoer writer suggested Wells's life as a subject for a boxing film, and thought it a better theme than the Corbett biography Gentleman Jim.

Wells was also one of several men filmed striking the gong in the trademark sequence shown before Rank films. He mimed the action, while the percussionist James Blades supplied the sound off screen. In September 2006, the quiz contestant Ingram Wilcox won the £1 million prize on Who Wants to Be a Millionaire? by identifying Wells as the boxer famous for striking the Rank gong.

The following credits are listed by the British Film Institute unless otherwise cited.

Film and television credits
Year	Title	Role or notes
1913	Willie versus Bombardier Wells	Bombardier Wells
1916	Kent, the Fighting Man	John Westerley
1918	The Great Game	Lead role
1920	The Silver Lining	Jerrold O'Farrell
1926	The Game Chicken	Hen Pearce
1926	When a Man's a Prince	Commentary in the 1947 reissue version
1927	The Ring	Boxer
1933	Money Talks	Cast member
1935	King of the Damned	Appeared with Helen Vinson
1936	Beloved Impostor	Policeman
1936	Broken Blossoms	Boxing referee, uncredited
1936	Melody of My Heart	Referee in a fight sequence
1936	Excuse My Glove	Cast member; appeared in a promotional trailer reviewing the film
1937	Double Alibi	Constable
1937	Make-up	Ringmaster
1937	Concerning Mr. Martin	Commissionaire
1938	Sailing Along	Role not stated
1939	There Ain't No Justice	Role not stated
1942	The Day Will Dawn	Barman
1942	We'll Smile Again	Publican
1943	Happidrome	Ivan
1953	The Beggar's Opera	Hangman
1957	A Santa for Christmas	On-screen participant

== Personal life and death ==
Wells married Ellen Kilroy at St Nicholas's Church, Tooting Graveney, on 7 September 1912. The register described Wells as a 24-year-old pugilist and Kilroy as a 16-year-old spinster; her father, Luke Kilroy, was a licensed victualler. They married between Wells's two visits to the United States and lived in Mitcham, close to Kilroy's parents. They had five children before separating. Shipley notes that Wells rarely discussed his home life except when writing about training.

In September 1964, Wells's son described him as "extremely fit" at 77 and said that he had marked his birthday by playing a round of golf. Wells died suddenly at his home in Ealing on 11 June 1967, aged 79. His home was The Studio, 1b Florence Road, and he was cremated at Ruislip.

== Boxing record ==
=== Professional boxing record ===
48 fights	37 wins	11 losses
By knockout	34	11
By decision	2	0
By disqualification	1	0

Shipley records 37 wins and 11 losses in Wells's 48 professional contests. Of the wins, 34 came by knockout or stoppage, two on points and one by disqualification. All 11 losses were by knockout. His chronological table includes the contest against Gunner McMurray. His Oxford Dictionary of National Biography (ODNB) entry identifies the Hague contest as Wells's eighth professional bout. The three Imperial Services Boxing Association (ISBA) tournament bouts that Shipley records for December 1918 appear in the separate table below. Dates, venues and result classifications in the professional table follow Shipley.

Professional boxing record
No.	Result	Record	Opponent	Type	Round(s)	Date	Location
48	Loss	37–11	Jack Stanley	KO	3	30 Apr 1925	Royal Albert Hall, Kensington, London, England
47	Win	37–10	Soldier Horace Jones	DQ	6	30 Jan 1925	The Dome, Brighton, England
46	Win	36–10	Gunner Bennett	RTD	9	15 Dec 1924	Olympia Theatre, Liverpool, England
45	Win	35–10	Charles Penwill	KO	2	24 Nov 1924	Hoxton Baths, Hoxton, London, England
44	Loss	34–10	Jack Bloomfield	KO	6	12 Oct 1922	Royal Albert Hall, Kensington, London, England
43	Loss	34–9	Frank Goddard	KO	6	27 May 1922	Crystal Palace, Sydenham, London, England
42	Win	34–8	Albert Lloyd	RTD	10	24 Apr 1922	National Sporting Club, Covent Garden, London, England
41	Win	33–8	Paul Journée	KO	17	7 Sep 1920	Deauville, France
40	Loss	32–8	Joe Beckett	KO	3	10 May 1920	Olympia, Kensington, London, England
39	Win	32–7	Eddie McGoorty	KO	16	8 Apr 1920	Holborn Stadium, London, England
38	Win	31–7	Paul Journée	KO	13	17 Mar 1920	Royal Albert Hall, Kensington, London, England
37	Win	30–7	Harry Reeve	KO	4	27 Jan 1920	Canterbury Music Hall, Lambeth, London, England
36	Win	29–7	Arthur Townley	RSC	9	2 Nov 1919	Holborn Stadium, London, England
35	Win	28–7	Jack Curphey	KO	2	17 Oct 1919	Holborn Stadium, London, England
34	Loss	27–7	Joe Beckett	KO	5	27 Feb 1919	Holborn Stadium, London, England
33	Win	27–6	Dan Voyles	RSC	2	18 Dec 1916	National Sporting Club, Covent Garden, London, England
32	Win	26–6	Dick Smith	RTD	9	26 Aug 1916	St James's Park, Newcastle, England
31	Win	25–6	Petty-Officer Curran	RTD	5	31 Mar 1916	Cosmopolitan, Plymouth, England
30	Win	24–6	Dick Smith	KO	3	21 Feb 1916	Golders Green Hippodrome, London, England
29	Win	23–6	Bandsman Rice	KO	1	27 Dec 1915	The Stadium, Liverpool, England
28	Win	22–6	Dick Smith	KO	9	31 May 1915	The Ring, Blackfriars, London, England
27	Loss	21–6	Frank Moran	KO	10	29 Mar 1915	London Opera House, London, England
26	Win	21–5	Bandsman Rice	KO	6	24 Feb 1915	Grand Opera House, Belfast, Ireland
25	Win	20–5	Dan McGoldrick	RTD	7	12 Feb 1915	Cosmopolitan, Plymouth, England
24	Win	19–5	Colin Bell	KO	2	30 Jun 1914	Olympia, Kensington, London, England
23	Win	18–5	Bandsman Rice	PTS	20	30 Apr 1914	The Stadium, Liverpool, England
22	Win	17–5	Albert Lurie	KO	7	2 Apr 1914	Canterbury Music Hall, Lambeth, London, England
21	Win	16–5	Bandsman Blake	KO	4	2 Mar 1914	London Palladium, London, England
20	Win	15–5	Gaston Pigot	KO	1	24 Jan 1914	Cardiff, Wales
19	Win	14–5	Gunner Rawles	RTD	10	14 Jan 1914	Theatre Royal, Belfast, Ireland
18	Loss	13–5	Georges Carpentier	KO	1	8 Dec 1913	National Sporting Club, Covent Garden, London, England
17	Win	13–4	Gunner Moir	KO	5	10 Sep 1913	Canterbury Music Hall, Lambeth, London, England
16	Win	12–4	Pat O'Keeffe	KO	15	4 Aug 1913	The Ring, Blackfriars, London, England
15	Win	11–4	Packey Mahoney	KO	13	30 Jun 1913	National Sporting Club, Covent Garden, London, England
14	Loss	10–4	Georges Carpentier	KO	4	1 Jun 1913	Ghent, Belgium
13	Loss	10–3	Gunboat Smith	KO	2	14 Mar 1913	Madison Square Garden, New York City, New York, United States
12	Win	10–2	George Rodel	KO	2	6 Dec 1912	King's Hall, Southwark, London, England
11	Win	9–2	Tom Kennedy	KO	8	18 Jul 1912	Madison Square Garden, New York City, New York, United States
10	Loss	8–2	Al Palzer	KO	3	28 Jun 1912	Madison Square Garden, New York City, New York, United States
9	Win	8–1	Fred Storbeck	KO	11	18 Dec 1911	National Sporting Club, Covent Garden, London, England
8	Win	7–1	Iron Hague	KO	6	24 Apr 1911	National Sporting Club, Covent Garden, London, England
7	Win	6–1	Porky Flynn	PTS	20	8 Mar 1911	Olympia, Kensington, London, England
6	Loss	5–1	Gunner Moir	KO	3	11 Jan 1911	Olympia, Kensington, London, England
5	Win	5–0	Seaman Parsons	KO	1	16 Nov 1910	King's Hall, Southwark, London, England
4	Win	4–0	Private Dan Voyles	KO	10	19 Oct 1910	King's Hall, Southwark, London, England
3	Win	3–0	Sergeant Sunshine	KO	6	15 Sep 1910	King's Hall, Southwark, London, England
2	Win	2–0	Corporal Brown	KO	3	23 Jul 1910	Wonderland, Whitechapel, London, England
1	Win	1–0	Gunner McMurray	KO	1	22 Jun 1910	Shoeburyness, England

=== Other recorded bouts ===
BoxRec's record contains 67 entries: 50 wins, 11 losses and six classified as no contest or no decision (NC/ND). The 19 entries below fall outside Shipley's 48-contest professional record. BoxRec marks seven of the early army-contest dates as uncertain. Shipley's table places the contests of September 1909 at Simla and those of February 1910 at Lucknow, with some results differing. The table reproduces BoxRec's dates, classifications and other details, with differences from other sources noted alongside the relevant entries.

Additional entries in BoxRec's record
Result	Opponent	Type	Round(s)	Date	Location	Notes
Win	Joe Beckett	PTS	3	12 Dec 1918	Royal Albert Hall, Kensington, London, England	ISBA King's Trophy final; Shipley also records a three-round points win.
Win	Eddie McGoorty	PTS	3	12 Dec 1918	Royal Albert Hall, Kensington, London, England	BoxRec lists this as an Inter-Allied tournament semi-final in addition to the 11 December semi-final below. Shipley lists one contest against McGoorty in the tournament, on 11 December. A contemporary report describes a single inter-Allied tournament in which Wells beat McGoorty in the semi-finals, and does not state the result method.
Win	Eddie McGoorty	PTS	3	11 Dec 1918	Royal Albert Hall, Kensington, London, England	ISBA King's Trophy semi-final; Shipley also records a three-round points win.
Win	Seaman Powell	PTS	3	11 Dec 1918	Royal Albert Hall, Kensington, London, England	ISBA King's Trophy first series; Shipley also records a three-round points win.
NC/ND	E. V. Chandler	—N/a	3	20 Dec 1915	National Sporting Club, Covent Garden, London, England	
NC/ND	F. Ormered	—N/a	3	11 Sep 1915	Merthyr Rink, Merthyr Tydfil, Wales	
NC/ND	Frank Hagney	—N/a	3	21 Sep 1914	The Ring, Blackfriars, London, England	
NC/ND	Pat O'Keeffe	—N/a	3	7 Sep 1914	Premierland, Whitechapel, London, England	BoxRec names O'Keeffe, but the contemporary report it cites instead describes an exhibition between Wells and Frank S. Hagney.
NC/ND	Jim Sullivan	—N/a	3	3 Oct 1912	The Ring, Blackfriars, London, England	BoxRec displays the round field as "3/3x2".
NC/ND	Jim Maloney	—N/a	3	23 Mar 1911	Garrison Theatre, Tidworth, England	
Win	Gunner Joe Mills	PTS	6	8 Jun 1910	The Wells Club, Bond Street, London, England	Shipley instead records a six-round exhibition in June 1910.
Win	Private Clohessy	RTD	3	13 Feb 1910	Regimental Theatre, Rawalpindi, India	Date marked uncertain by BoxRec.
Win	Drummer Ness	PTS	3	5 Feb 1910	Central Gymnasium, Lucknow, India	BoxRec identifies this as the final of a heavyweight competition. Shipley records a first-round knockout of Ness at Lucknow in February 1910.
Win	Private Clohessy	PTS	3	14 Oct 1909	Regimental Theatre, Rawalpindi, India	Date marked uncertain by BoxRec.
Win	Sergeant Gale	KO	2	29 Sep 1909	Regimental Theatre, Rawalpindi, India	Date marked uncertain by BoxRec.
Win	Corporal Gouldburn	KO	1	28 Sep 1909	Regimental Theatre, Rawalpindi, India	Date marked uncertain by BoxRec.
Win	Private Tansell	KO	2	14 Jul 1909	Shimla, India	BoxRec lists an All-India heavyweight title and marks the date uncertain. Shipley records the All-India championship at Poona in March 1909, with second-round knockouts of Turner and Jarvis followed by a three-round points win over Tansell.
Win	Private Jarvis	KO	1	29 Jun 1909	Regimental Theatre, Rawalpindi, India	Date marked uncertain by BoxRec.
Win	Gunner Turner	KO	1	15 Jun 1909	Regimental Theatre, Rawalpindi, India	Date marked uncertain by BoxRec.

== See also ==
- List of British heavyweight boxing champions
