= John Liddell =

John Liddell may refer to:

- Sir John Liddell (Royal Navy officer) (died 1868), Scottish doctor and Director-General of the Medical Department of the British Royal Navy
- John Liddell (1879–1928), British boxer better known as Jack Palmer
- John Liddell (footballer) (1933–1999), Scottish footballer
- John Aidan Liddell (1888–1915), English pilot and recipient of the Victoria Cross
- John Hellyer Liddell, (1899–1984), Chairman of the Shanghai Municipal Council
- St. John Richardson Liddell (1815–1870), Louisiana planter and Confederate general
- John Liddell (architect) (1831–1922), Scottish architect
- Johnny Liddell (footballer, born 1915) (1915–1986), Scottish footballer
