= Dick Smith (boxer) =

Personal information
- Nationality: British
- Born: 10 February 1886 Woolwich, London, England
- Died: 8 January 1950 (aged 63) Dartford, England
- Weight: Light heavyweight, heavyweight

Boxing career

Boxing record
- Total fights: 18
- Wins: 6
- Win by KO: 1
- Losses: 11
- Draws: 1

Richard Smith (10 February 1886 – 8 January 1950) was a British light heavyweight and heavyweight boxer who was British light heavyweight champion between 1914 and 1916 and again in 1918. He fought under the name Dick Smith.

== Career ==
Born in Woolwich, London, Dick Smith served in the armed forces in India where he won several services boxing championships, and he also won police boxing titles while a member of the police force.

As an amateur he won successive A.B.A heavyweight titles in 1912 and 1913.

He had his first professional fight in January 1914, a challenge to Dennis Haugh for his British light heavyweight title, which he lost in a controversial points decision. He met Haugh again two months later, this time winning on points over 20 rounds to take the title. He was due to fight French champion Georges Carpentier in May 1914 but the fight was postponed after Carpentier was kicked by a horse. They were due to fight in November 1914 but the fight was cancelled.

Smith, then a sergeant in the British Army gymnastic staff, then moved up to the heavyweight division, challenging Bombardier Billy Wells for the British heavyweight title in May 1915; He lost after being knocked out in the ninth round. He met Wells for the title again in February 1916, losing by a third-round knockout.

He returned to light-heavyweight for a successful defence of his British title against Harry Curzon in June 1916.

He challenged Wells for the heavyweight title for a third time in August 1916 in front of 11,800 people at St James' Park, Newcastle, this time being stopped in the ninth round.

He made the second defence of his light-heavyweight title against Harry Reeve in October 1916, with Reeve taking the title on a points decision after 20 rounds. Reeve relinquished the title and Smith fought Joe Beckett in February 1918 for the vacant title; Smith won a 20-round points decision to reclaim the title. By December 1918 Smith had risen to the rank of company sergeant major.

In July 1919 Smith met Carpentier in Paris with the EBU heavyweight and the IBU light heavyweight titles at stake; Carpentier won by a knockout in the 8th round.

In March 1920 he fought Beckett for the British heavyweight title, Beckett winning by a 5th-round knockout. In November 1922 he beat Australian heavyweight champion George Cook. In May 1923 he fought Beckett again for the heavyweight title but lost again after being knocked out in the 17th round while ahead on points.

Smith retired from boxing in 1924, his last fight a defeat to Jack Bloomfield attended by the Prince of Wales, after which he ran a pub in Dartford where he displayed his trophies and his Lonsdale Belt. Smith was described as "one of the most scientific boxers of the day".

He was a keen golfer and also worked as a boxing referee.

Dick Smith died on 8 January 1950 at his home in Dartford, aged 63.

== See also ==
- List of British light-heavyweight boxing champions
