= Jack Bloomfield =

English boxer (1899–1961)

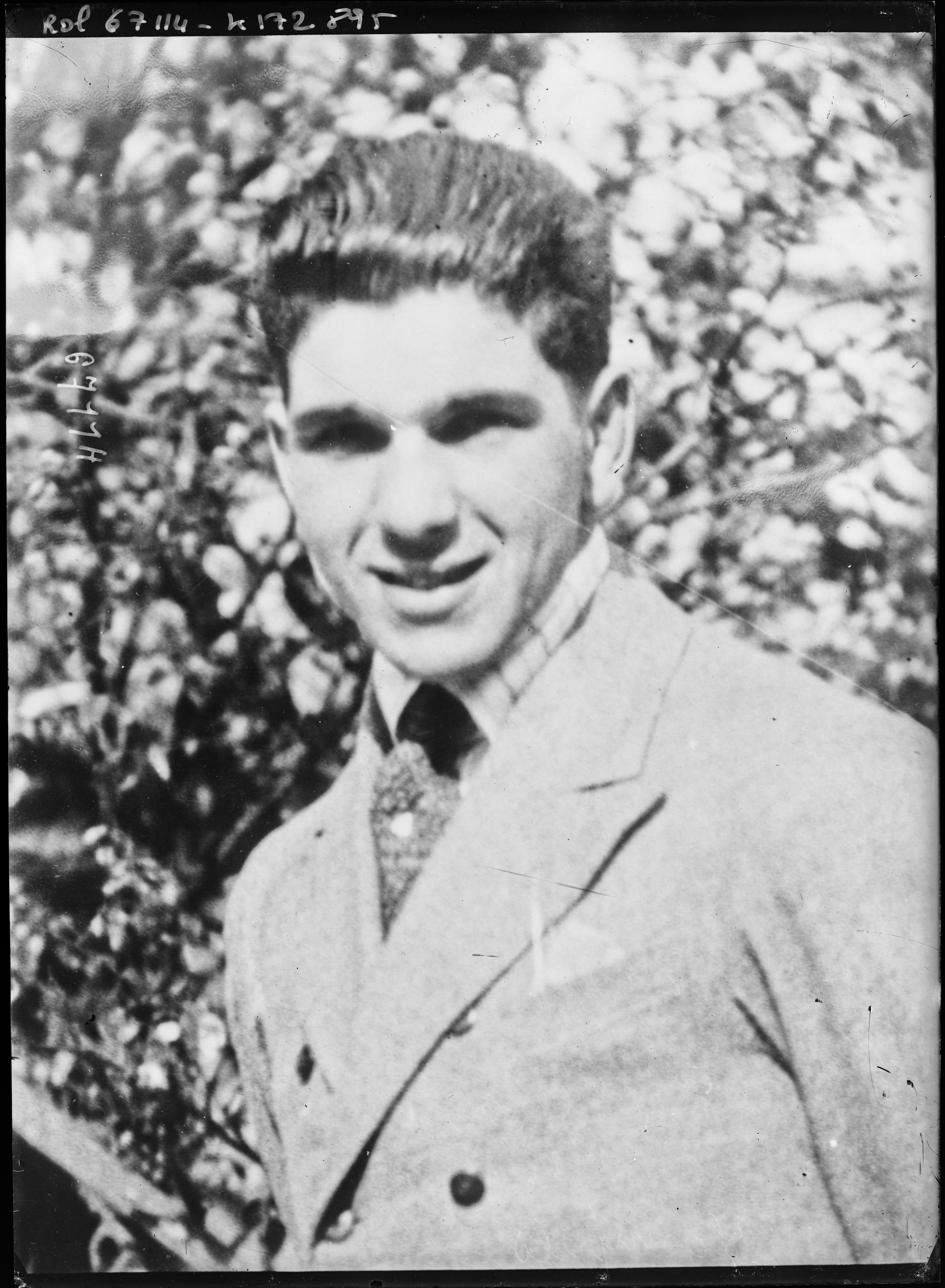

Personal information
- Nickname: "Basking" Jack Bloomfield
- Nationality: English
- Born: Sol Blumenfeld; 20 November 1899 Islington, London, England
- Died: 1961 (aged 61)
- Weight: Light heavyweight

Boxing career
- Stance: Orthodox

Boxing record
- Total fights: 36
- Wins: 28
- Win by KO: 20
- Losses: 5
- Draws: 2
- No contests: 1

Jack Bloomfield (20 November 1899 – 1961) was an English light heavyweight professional boxer, whose birth name was Sol Blumenfeld, and who was also known as "Basking" Jack Bloomfield during his career. He took part in the first ever boxing event to be held at Wembley Stadium. He lived in Islington, London.

== Career ==
=== At middleweight ===
Bloomfield's first professional fight was at middleweight, against fellow Londoner Joe Gannon in Finsbury, London, on 12 March 1918, and he won this by a knockout in the first round.

He entered his first competition on 9 September 1918, when he fought 3 three-round bouts in one day, beating a Sergeant Braddock in the final of the Inter-Allied Middleweight Competition.

In his next tournament, the SBA King's Trophy Middleweight Competition, held on 11 December 1918 at the Royal Albert Hall, he lost on points in the final, again over 3 rounds, to Billy Fullerton.

Staying at middleweight, Bloomfield won his next three fights, which took place between March and June 1919, before suffering a "no contest" decision in the 8th round against Eddie Feathers on 28 July 1919. He was back to winning ways in his last three fights of 1919, and all by technical knockout.

On 23 April 1920, he fought his first bout in the USA, defeating Walter McGirr in a 6-round contest in Jersey City, New Jersey. During the rest of the year, Bloomfield fought six more US and Canadian fighters, winning four, losing one and drawing one. Returning to London in 1921, he won two more fights during February, before challenging the vastly experienced Ted "Kid" Lewis for the vacant British Middleweight Championship at Holland Park Rink in London on 27 June. This was fought over a mammoth 20 rounds, and Bloomfield lost on points. In December, he eased his way back with a 3rd-round knockout win against a Services boxer in Hoxton, London.

=== At light-heavyweight and heavyweight ===
From the beginning of 1922, Bloomfield moved up to the heavyweight division for one fight (which he won), before switching to his eventual weight of choice, light heavyweight, to fight one winning bout prior to his next attempt at a championship belt. This was the BBBofC title vacated by Noel "Boy" McCormick, and Bloomfield was matched with Harry Drake in a 20-round contest in London on 1 May 1922. Drake lost this on a technical decision in the 9th round, to give Bloomfield his first ever universally recognised championship.

Twice defending the title successfully that year, against Albert "Kid" Lloyd and "Bombardier" Billy Wells (both by 6th-round knockouts), he then challenged John "Soldier Jones" Beaudin of Canada for the British Empire Light Heavyweight Championship at the National Sporting Club in London on 26 March 1923, winning by a technical knockout in the 5th round, to add another belt to his collection.

He successfully defended the British Empire title in May of that year, when Northern Irishman Dave Magill quit in the thirteenth round of twenty at Olympia in London. However, for his next title attempt in November of that year, moving up a weight, he was to suffer an embarrassing defeat.

Challenging Frank Goddard for the vacant British Heavyweight Championship at the Royal Albert Hall, Bloomfield was disqualified in the second round for hitting Goddard while he was down.

== First ever boxing match at Wembley ==
After winning one more light heavyweight bout in May 1924, Bloomfield was chosen to take part in the first ever boxing match to be held at the recently built Wembley Stadium, against Tommy Gibbons of the United States in a non-title fight which took place during the British Empire Exhibition on 9 August 1924. This contest was also notable for causing the bankruptcy of Major Arnold Wilson from Preston, who had promoted the fight, but was met with severe financial demands from Gibbons. Bloomfield was knocked out in the 3rd round, and never fought again. He died in 1961.

== See also ==
- List of British light-heavyweight boxing champions
