= Joe Beckett =

English boxer

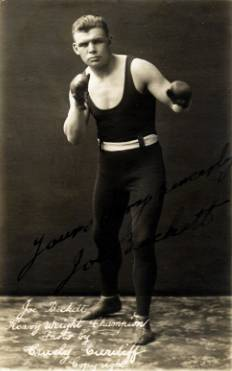

Personal information
- Nationality: English
- Born: Joseph Beckett; 4 April 1892 Wickham, Hampshire, England
- Died: 12 March 1965 (aged 72)
- Height: 5 ft 9 1/2 in (1.77 m)
- Weight: light heavy/cruiser/heavyweight

Boxing career
- Reach: 72 in (183 cm)

Boxing record
- Total fights: 28
- Wins: 19 (KO 15)
- Losses: 9 (KO 7)

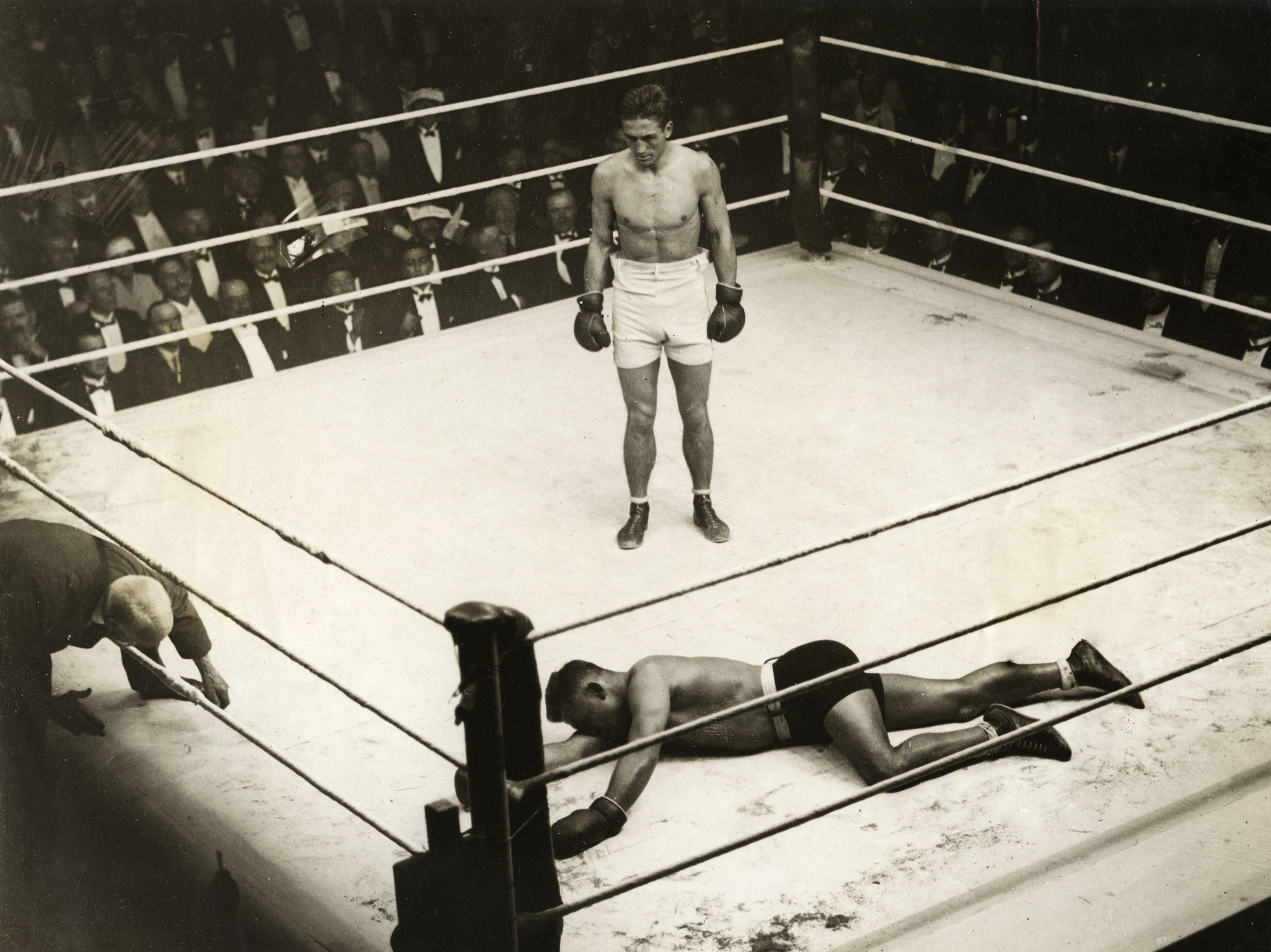
Georges Carpentier knocks out Joe Beckett (1919)

Joseph Beckett (4 April 1892 – 12 March 1965), also known by the nickname of "Joe", born in Wickham, Hampshire was an English professional light heavy/cruiser/heavyweight boxer of the 1910s and early 1920s, who won the National Sporting Club (NSC) (subsequently known as the British Boxing Board of Control (BBBofC)) British heavyweight title, and British Empire heavyweight title, and challenged for the NSC British Light heavyweight title, and European Boxing Union (EBU) heavyweight title.

== Boxing career ==
=== Professional ===
Joe Beckett's first professional boxing bout was a knockout defeat by Packy Mahoney (Ireland) at the National Sporting Club, Covent Garden, London on 18 November 1912. This was followed by fights including; a technical knockout victory over Harry Smith (South Africa), a points victory over Montana Dan Sullivan (US), four wins, two defeats, and then a technical knockout victory over Porky Dan Flynn (US), one defeat, and then a points defeat by Dick Smith for the National Sporting Club British light heavyweight title at the National Sporting Club, Covent Garden, London on 25 February 1918, one win, and then a points defeat by Bombardier Billy Wells for the Imperial Services Boxing Association (ISBA) Kings Trophy heavyweight title at Royal Albert Hall, London on 12 December 1918, one win, and then a knockout victory over Bombardier Billy Wells for the British heavyweight title, and British Empire heavyweight title at Holborn Stadium, London on 27 February 1919, Beckett was not recognised by National Sporting Club so the British heavyweight title was declared vacant, a knockout victory over Frank Goddard for the National Sporting Club British heavyweight title at Olympia, London on 17 June 1919, a knockout victory over Eddie McGoorty (US), a knockout defeat by Georges Carpentier (France) for the European Boxing Union (EBU) heavyweight title at Holborn Stadium, London on 4 December 1919, a knockout victory over Dick Smith defending the British heavyweight title, a knockout victory over Bombardier Billy Wells defending the British heavyweight title, a retirement victory over Tommy Burns (Canada) defending the British Empire heavyweight title, a knockout defeat by Frank Moran (US), a technical knockout victory over Boy McCormick defending the British heavyweight title, a disqualification victory over George Cook (Australia) defending the British Empire heavyweight title, a technical knockout victory over Frank Moran (US), a knockout victory over Dick Smith defending the British heavyweight title, Joe Beckett's final professional boxing bout was a knockout defeat by Georges Carpentier at Olympia, London on 1 October 1923.
