= Bill Lang =

Australian heavyweight boxer and footballer

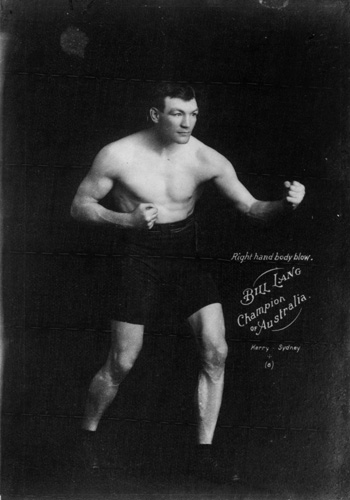
- Born: William Lanfranchi; 6 July 1882; Carlton, Victoria
- Died: 3 September 1952 (aged 70); St Kilda East, Victoria
- Boxing career
- Height: 185 cm (6 ft 1 in)
- Weight: Heavyweight
- Reach: 185 cm (73 in)
- Stance: Orthodox

Boxing record
- Total fights: 43
- Wins: 27
- Win by KO: 21
- Losses: 15
- Draws: 1
- No contests: 1
Australian rules football career
Personal information
- Original teams: Collingwood Juniors, North Fremantle
- Debut: Round 1, 1908, Richmond vs. Melbourne, at Punt Road Oval
- Height: 185 cm (6 ft 1 in)
- Weight: 89 kg (196 lb)
Playing career^{1}
Years	Club	Games (Goals)
1905–1907	Richmond (VFA)	40 (20)
1908–1909	Richmond (VFL)	14 (7)
Total		54 (27)
- ^{1} Playing statistics correct to the end of 1909.

Bill Lang (born William Lanfranchi; 6 July 1882 – 3 September 1952) was an Australian professional boxer who held the national heavyweight title. He was also an Australian rules footballer who played with Richmond in the Victorian Football League (VFL).

== Family ==
The son of a Swiss-French father, and an Irish mother — Joseph Victor Lanfranchi (1838–1922), and Mary Ann Lafranchi (1850–1901), née Power, — William Lanfranchi was born in Carlton on 6 July 1882.

He married Lydia Hudson (1893–1940) on 13 July 1915; they had two children.

== Football ==
=== North Fremantle (WAFA) ===
In 1902, along with Carlton's "Pompey" Elliott, he moved from Victoria and played for North Fremantle Football Club, in the West Australian Football Association (WAFA), for the entire 1902 season.

He made his debut for North Fremantle, in round 3 (24 May 1902), against West Perth. He was suspended for two weeks following a fiery match between North Fremantle and West Perth on 2 August 1902, in which Lang, his team-mate Joe Corkill, and West Perth's Jack Randell were sent off.

During the season's Grand Final on 13 September 1902, in which North Fremantle played Perth (which Perth won, unexpectedly), Lang and Perth's Jack Wells were "sent off" for fighting each other in the third quarter.

The game between Perth and North Fremantle … at Fremantle on Saturday, very nearly ended abruptly in the third quarter.
During a scrimmage on the Press-box wing, Wells, of Perth, and Lang, of North Fremantle, came to blows.
Fraser, the umpire, did not see the first blow struck, and, therefore, could not tell who was the aggressor, but he saw sufficient of the encounter to warrant him in ordering both players to leave the field.
Wells immediately walked off the ground, but Lang refused, claiming provocation as an excuse for his conduct.
The umpire promptly stopped the game, and a heated controversy ensued between the players.
As Lang persisted in remaining on the ground, Fraser decided to end the match, and, calling both teams off the field, he walked towards the pavilion with the ball.
Fortunately, however, better counsels prevailed with Lang, and before the players had reached the gate he expressed his willingness to obey the umpire's ruling.
The game was then resumed, Lang and Wells taking no further part in the contest.
The West Australian, 15 September 1902.

Both players were later found guilty of fighting and were each disqualified for the first two matches of the 1903 season.

=== Richmond (VFA) ===
He played for Richmond in the VFA for three seasons. He played at centre half-back in Richmond's 1905 VFA premiership team.

=== Richmond (VFL) ===
He played 14 games for Richmond in the VFL, primarily as a follower, over two seasons, 1908, and 1909. He played in Richmond's first-ever match in the VFL, on 2 May 1908, in which Richmond defeated Melbourne 8.14 (62) to 7.9 (51). He retired halfway through the 1909 season in order to concentrate on his boxing career.

=== Carlton District (MAFA) ===
In 1913 he was cleared from Richmond to the Carlton District Football Club in the Metropolitan Amateur Football Association (MAFA).

== Boxing ==
External media

Images
- Postcard: Victoria's Champion Bill Lang, Collection of the National Museum of Australia.
- Photograph: Bill Lang, Jack Johnson, and handlers, 1907, Collection of the National Library of Australia.
- Photograph: Bill Lang, ready to deliver a left hook; c.1908, Collection of the State Library of South Australia.
- Poster: Heavyweight championship of Australia, Bill Lang v. Bill Squires on Monday 25th October 1909 at Melbourne Athletic Pavilion, Collection of the National Library of Australia.
- Photograph: Bill Lang and Bill Squires fight for the heavyweight championship of Australia at Brisbane Stadium, 9 August 1911, Collection of the National Library of Australia.
- Advertising card for Bill Lang vs. Arthur Pelkey, 4 April 1914 (recto), Collection of the National Museum of Australia.
- Advertising card for Bill Lang vs. Arthur Pelkey, 4 April 1914 (verso), Collection of the National Museum of Australia.
- Mounted photograph: Jack Johnson, Light Heavy & Heavyweight Champion of Australia (left); Bill Lang, Heavyweight Champion of Australia, 1909–1914 (centre); Jack Dempsey, Heavyweight Champion of the World, 1919–1926 (right), c.1945, Collection of the National Library of Australia.

Video
- Bill Lang vs Bob Fitzsimmons: Sydney Stadium, 27 December 1909, Collection of The Boxing Hall of Fame, Las Vegas.
- Sam Langford vs. Bill Lang: Olympia, West Kensington, London: 21 February 1911.

He fought 43 times over a twelve-year career (1905 to 1916) for 27 wins, 14 losses, and 1 draw. He was the first Australian to fight for a world heavyweight title.

"Lang was the type who looked for advice from his second, round by round.
He never failed to listen attentively, and usually put the advice into practice."
Joe Stokesberry, Lang's former trainer, 21 May 1941.
"For the full ten years of his ring career, Bill Lang fought with his feet in the wrong position and his hands held out the wrong way.
Not until his fighting days were nearly over did he make a discovery that might have given him the world's heavyweight championship, had he realised his error when he was in his prime."
The Adelaide Chronicle, 27 February 1936.

=== 1905 ===
Lang began his professional boxing career in 1905 — when he fought Edward "Starlight" Rollins, at Melbourne's Queen's Hall in Bourke Street, on 9 January 1905, — the same year that he was centre half-back in the Richmond VFA premiership team.

=== 1907 ===
He fought future world champion Jack Johnson at Richmond Race Course on 4 March 1907 for a purse of £500, and lost on a TKO.

On 3 October 1907 — six bouts later (all of which Lang won) — he defeated Peter Felix at the Broken Hill Hippodrome to claim the vacant Australian heavyweight title when Felix, whose leg was badly injured, was unable to rise from the ring before the count of ten.

Lang also fought a title re-match against Felix in Melbourne on 17 February 1908. The boxers, despite Lang's protests, were forced to wear six-ounce gloves, rather than the customary four. Lang won; with a seventh-round TKO (Felix's corner threw in the towel before the eighth round started).

=== 1908 ===
After defending his title five successive times, Lang earned a title bout with reigning world champion Tommy Burns at a specially built stadium on City Road South Melbourne on 3 September 1908. He knocked Burns to the floor with a left hook in the second round, however Burns got up before the end of the count. The Canadian went on to win with a KO in the sixth round.

=== 1909 ===
On 27 December 1909, Lang (aged 26) had a notable knockout win over Bob Fitzsimmons — aged 51, and a former world middleweight champion (1891), a former world light heavyweight champion (1903), and a former world heavyweight champion (1897) — at Sydney Stadium.

=== 1910–1911 (overseas) ===
Lang went overseas in 1910 and fought Al Kaufman in the US, on 5 September 1910, at the Baker Bowl in Philadelphia. Moving to the United Kingdom, he fought three times at the Olympia, West Kensington, London:

- 26 December 1910: against US boxer "Salinas" Jack Burns, which Lang won on a TKO.
- 18 January 1911: against Petty Officer Matthew "Nutty" Curran for the vacant British Empire Heavyweight title. Lang lost the title bout due to an (alleged) foul, due to a mistaken judgement that he had punched his opponent after his opponent's knee had hit the canvas. Lang won both of their (1913) return bouts on points.
- 21 February 1911: against the renowned Canadian, Sam Langford — who, weighing in at 165 lbs (77 kg), was considerably lighter that Lang, who weighed in at 196 lbs (89 kg) — which Lang lost after being (controversially) disqualified.

=== 1911 (Australia) ===
On his return to Australia he defended his national title on two occasions, before losing it to Jack Lester, on 9 September 1911, in a points decision.

- 13 May 1911: Against Jack Lester, at the Sydney Stadium. Lester was disqualified.
- 9 August 1911: Against Bill Squires, at the Sydney Stadium. Lang won on a TKO.

=== 1913–1914 ===
- 3 May 1913: against P.O. Matthew "Nutty" Curran, at Sydney Stadium. Lang won on points.
- 16 August 1913: against P.O. Matthew "Nutty" Curran, at Sydney Stadium. Lang won on points.

He fought three more times, against well-credentialed, strong opponents, before retiring from the ring:

- 5 November 1913: in Melbourne, against New Zealander Dave Smith for the vacant Australian Heavyweight title. Lang lost on points.
- 4 April 1914: in Sydney, against Canadian Arthur Pelkey, a former White Heavyweight Champion of the World. Lang won the bout when Pelkey's corner threw in the towel before the start of the 20th round.
- 5 October 1914: in Sydney, against South African Fred Storbeck, a former Heavyweight Champion of the British Empire. Lang lost when he was disqualified in round 18.

=== 1916 "comeback" ===
- 25 November 1916: a "comeback" bout against the American Tom "Bearcat" McMahon at West Melbourne Stadium. Lang was knocked out in the fifth round.

=== Retirement ===
He retired after his McMahon fight, and began to advertise boxing classes.

In the mid-1930s, he wrote an extensive series of autobiographical reminiscences, that were published in sixteen weekly instalments by The Adelaide Chronicle (between 21 November 1935 and 13 February 1936) under the generic title Old Fights Fought Again.

=== Hall of Fame ===
Lang was inducted into the Australian National Boxing Hall of Fame in 2004.

== Later life ==
For more than fifteen years, he was the owner-licensee of the Victoria Hotel, on the corner of Victoria and Raleigh Streets, in Footscray, Victoria.

== Death ==
He died at his East St Kilda residence on 3 September 1952. Lang was buried at the Melbourne General Cemetery.
