= Georges Carpentier =

French boxer (1894–1975)

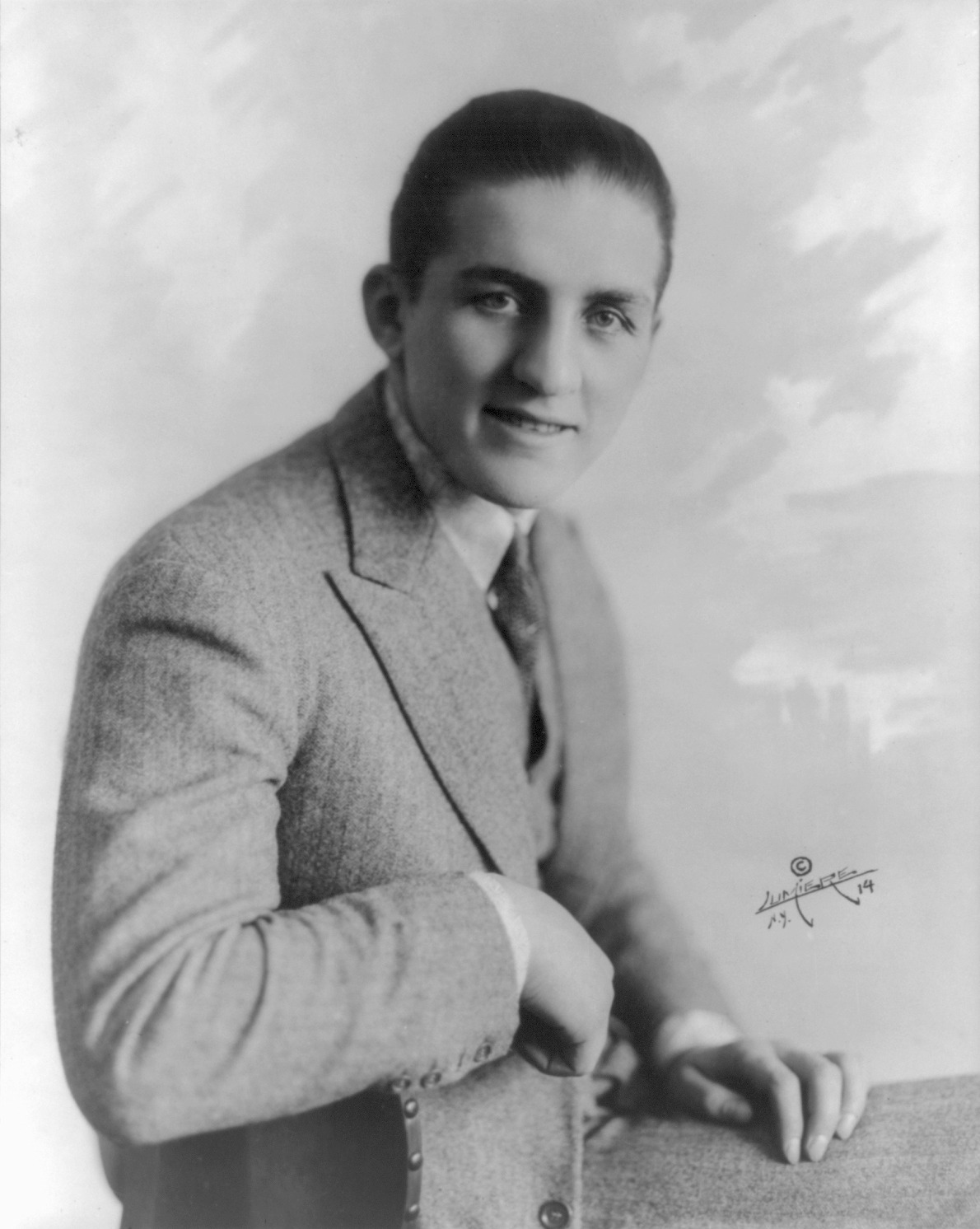

Personal information
- Nickname: The Orchid Man
- Nationality: French
- Born: 12 January 1894 Liévin, France
- Died: 28 October 1975 (aged 81) Paris, France
- Height: 5 ft 11 1/2 in (182 cm)
- Weight: Welterweight; Middleweight; Light heavyweight Heavyweight

Boxing career
- Stance: Orthodox

Boxing record
- Total fights: 112
- Wins: 89
- Win by KO: 57
- Losses: 15
- Draws: 6
- No contests: 1

Georges Carpentier (French pronunciation: [ʒɔʁʒ kaʁpɑ̃tje]; 12 January 1894 – 28 October 1975) was a French boxer, actor and World War I pilot. A precocious pugilist, Carpentier fought in numerous categories. He fought mainly as a light heavyweight and heavyweight in a career lasting from 1908 to 1926. A French professional champion on several occasions, he became the European heavyweight champion before the First World War. A sergeant aviator during the Great War, he was wounded before returning to civilian life. He then discovered rugby union, playing as a winger.

On his return to the ring in 1919, "le grand Georges" ("the great Georges" in English) he was celebrated as a symbol of a sporting powerhouse France, via performances in Great Britain and the United States of America. His knockout victory over Battling Levinsky on 12 October 1920 in Jersey City in the United States earned him the title of world champion. A defeat by Jack Dempsey the following year nevertheless strengthened his legend and brought him worldwide fame. This defeat marked the decline of his career, punctuated by the controversial loss of his titles to Battling Siki.

Nicknamed the "Orchid Man", he stood 5 feet 11 1/2 inches (182 cm) and his fighting weight ranged from 147 to 175 pounds (67 to 79 kg).

Later notable performances included a defeat by Gene Tunney. Carpentier ended his career in 1926, but remained a leading figure in French boxing. Appointed ambassador for French sport abroad after the Second World War, in which he took part in the French Air Force, Carpentier died of a heart attack in 1975. A decade after his death, the Parisian Sports Arena in the 13th arrondissement of Paris was renamed Halle Georges-Carpentier after him. Along with Marcel Cerdan, he remains one of France's best boxers.

== Biography ==
Born in Liévin in Pas-de-Calais, Carpentier began his career by progressing up through the weight divisions, fighting in every division from welterweight upwards. After making his first professional bout at age 14, he was welterweight champion of France and of Europe in 1911, middleweight champion of Europe in 1912, and light heavyweight champion of Europe in 1913. On 1 June 1913, he beat "Bombardier" Billy Wells in Ghent, Belgium to become heavyweight champion of Europe. He defended his title in December against Wells, in January 1914 against Pat O'Keeffe and in London on 16 July he beat Ed "Gunboat" Smith to add the "White Heavyweight Champion of the World" to his European title. The white heavyweight title bout sported a purse worth £9,000 (equivalent to approximately £897,872 today).

Carpentier was also a referee during the early stages of his career, supervising a number of fights including the world title bout between Jack Johnson and Frank Moran in June 1914. Carpentier was a French Air Force aviator during World War I and was awarded two of the highest French military honors, the Croix de Guerre and the Médaille Militaire. This served to heighten his already exceptional popularity, not only in France but also in the United Kingdom and the United States.

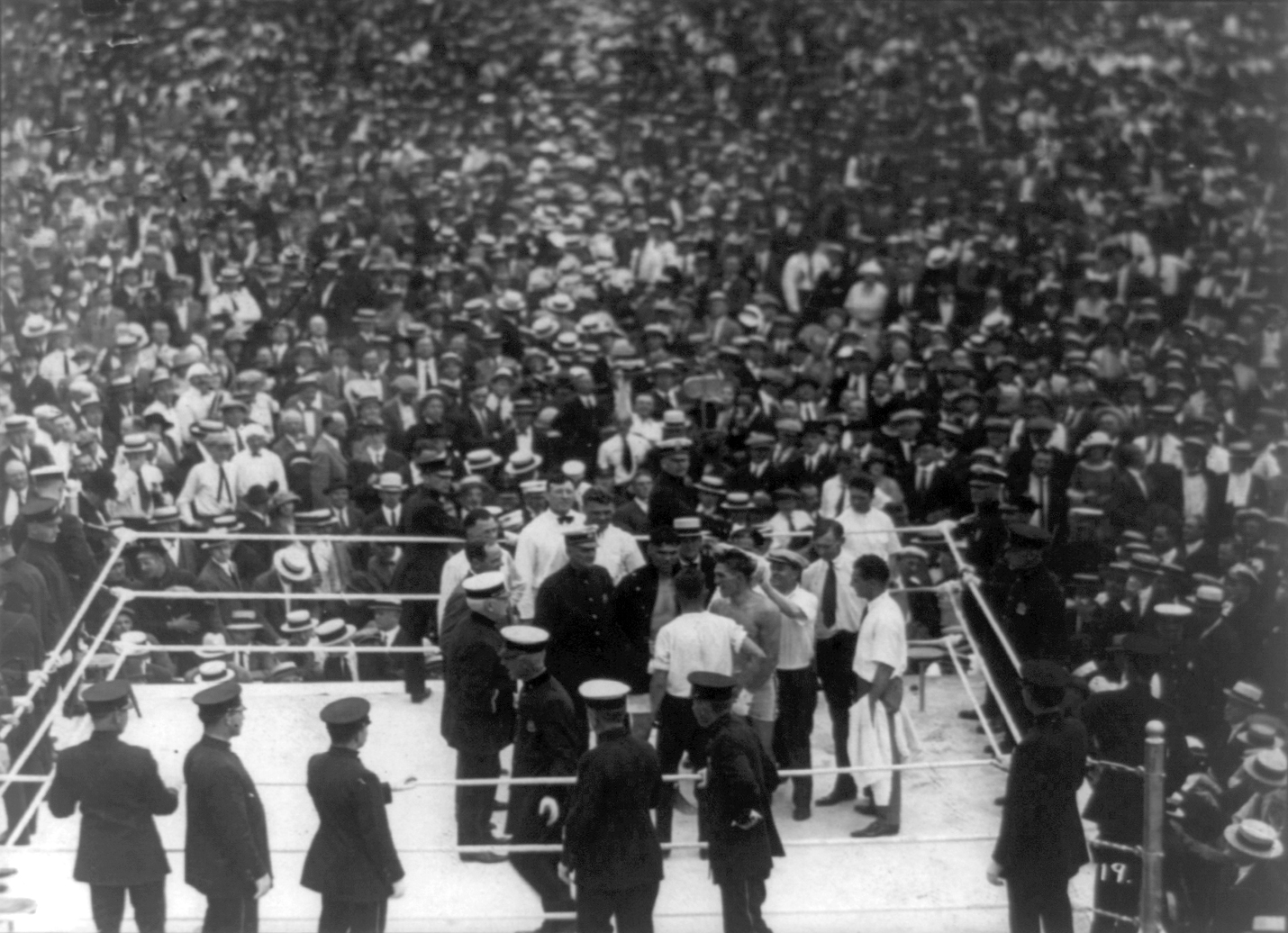
Dempsey and Carpentier in the arena before the fight

Carpentier defended his title twice again in 1919 before dropping down a weight class to challenge Battling Levinsky for the light heavyweight championship of the world. The fight took place on 12 October 1920, in Jersey City and Levinsky was knocked out in the fourth. Carpentier's attempt at the heavyweight Championship of the world came on 2 July 1921, again in Jersey City, when he faced Jack Dempsey in front of boxing's first million dollar gate (approximately $18,000,000 today). Carpentier was badly beaten around before suffering a knockout in the second minute of the fourth round and never fought again for that title. He lost his world light heavyweight title and his European heavyweight and light heavyweight titles the following year, on 24 September 1922, in a controversial bout with Senegalese fighter Battling Siki. His last truly noteworthy fight was on 24 July 1924, with Gene Tunney at the Polo Grounds in Manhattan, New York City. Carpentier lost the bout by TKO after fifteen rounds. He retired from the ring after a final exhibition bout in 1927.

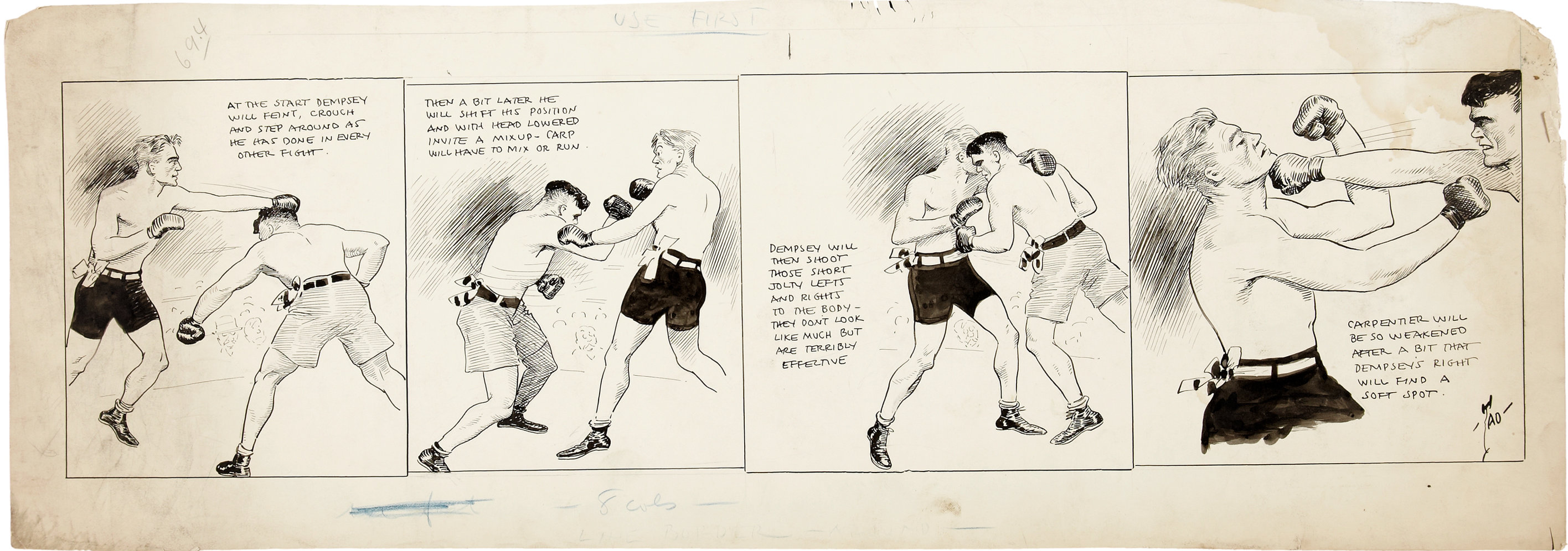
In June 1921, cartoonist Tad Dorgan drew what he expected would occur in the Carpentier-Dempsey fight.

Following his retirement from boxing, Carpentier spent a number of years as a vaudeville song-and-dance man, mostly in the UK and the US. As a singer he cut two sides on a gramophone record in 1927 for Pathé, in the style of French singer Maurice Chevalier. He is the author of a boxing novel, Brothers of the Brown Owl: A Story of the Boxing Ring published c. 1920 by Cassell and Company (being a volume in the uniform Cassell's Empire Library). He also appeared in half a dozen motion pictures, starring in both silent films and talkies. He made three films in Hollywood, US, one for director J. Stuart Blackton in England and two in his native France. His last screen appearance was in 1934. Soon after, he became proprietor of an upmarket bar, Chez Georges Carpentier, in a chic Paris neighbourhood. In several different locations, this is the profession he would exercise until shortly before his death.

From the time they boxed together in 1921, Carpentier remained close friends with Jack Dempsey. They visited each other in New York and Paris, got together to commemorate the anniversary of their famous bout and exchanged birthday greetings.

== Death ==
Carpentier died in Paris at age 81 in 1975 of a heart attack, and was buried in the cimetière de Vaires-sur-Marne, Seine-et-Marne, France.

== Legacy ==
He was elected to the International Boxing Hall of Fame in 1991.

== Selected filmography ==
- The Wonder Man (1920)
- A Gipsy Cavalier (1922)
- The Show of Shows (1929)
- Hold Everything (1930)
- Toboggan (1934)

== Professional boxing record ==
112 fights	89 wins	15 losses
By knockout	57	10
By decision	29	4
By disqualification	3	1
Draws	6	
No contests	1	
Newspaper decisions/draws	1	

All newspaper decisions are officially regarded as “no decision” bouts and are not counted in the win/loss/draw column.

No.	Result	Record	Opponent	Type	Round	Date	Age	Location	Notes
112	Win	89–15–6 (2)	Rocco Stramaglia	KO	3 (12)	15 September 1926	32 years, 246 days	Elks Gym, Coeur d'Alene, Idaho, U.S.	
111	Win	88–15–6 (2)	Jack Burke	KO	2 (4)	7 July 1926	32 years, 176 days	Denver, Colorado, U.S.	
110	Loss	87–15–6 (2)	Tommy Loughran	UD	10	17 June 1926	32 years, 156 days	Sesquicentennial Stadium, Philadelphia, Pennsylvania, U.S.	
109	Draw	87–14–6 (2)	Eddie Huffman	PTS	10	21 May 1926	32 years, 129 days	Madison Square Garden, New York City, New York, U.S.	
108	Loss	87–14–5 (2)	Gene Tunney	TKO	15 (15)	24 July 1924.	30 years, 194 days	Polo Grounds, New York City, New York, U.S.	
107	Loss	87–13–5 (2)	Tommy Gibbons	NWS	10	31 May 1924	30 years, 140 days	Floyd Fitzsimmons' Arena, Michigan City, Indiana, U.S.	
106	Win	87–13–5 (1)	Arthur Townley	KO	2 (10)	1 May 1924	30 years, 110 days	Stadion Hohe Warte, Vienna, Austria	
105	Win	86–13–5 (1)	Joe Beckett	KO	1 (20)	1 October 1923	29 years, 262 days	Olympia, Kensington, London, England	Won vacant IBU heavyweight title
104	Win	85–13–5 (1)	Marcel Nilles	KO	8 (20)	6 May 1923	29 years, 114 days	Stade Buffalo, Montrouge, Hauts-de-Seine, France	Won vacant France heavyweight title
103	Loss	84–13–5 (1)	Battling Siki	KO	6 (20)	24 September 1922	28 years, 255 days	Stade Buffalo, Montrouge, Hauts-de-Seine, France	Lost NBA, NYSAC, and IBU light-heavyweight titles Lost IBU heavyweight title
102	Win	84–12–5 (1)	Ted 'Kid' Lewis	KO	1 (20)	11 May 1922	28 years, 119 days	Olympia, Kensington, London, England	Retained NBA, NYSAC, and IBU light-heavyweight titles
101	Win	83–12–5 (1)	George Cook	KO	4 (10)	12 January 1922	28 years, 0 days	Royal Albert Hall, Kensington, London, England	
100	Loss	82–12–5 (1)	Jack Dempsey	KO	4 (12)	2 Jul 1921	27 years, 171 days	Boyle's Thirty Acres, Jersey City, New Jersey, U.S.	For NYSAC and NBA heavyweight titles
99	Win	82–11–5 (1)	Battling Levinsky	KO	4 (12)	12 October 1920	26 years, 274 days	Westside Ballpark, Jersey City, New Jersey, U.S.	Won world and vacant NYSAC light-heavyweight titles
98	Win	81–11–5 (1)	Georges Grundhoven	KO	2 (15)	21 February 1920	26 years, 40 days	Palais du Soleil, Beausoleil, Alpes-Maritimes, France	
97	Win	80–11–5 (1)	Blink McCloskey	KO	2 (15)	10 January 1920	25 years, 363 days	Alhambra, Bordeaux, Gironde, France	
96	Win	79–11–5 (1)	Joe Beckett	KO	1 (20)	4 December 1919	25 years, 326 days	Holborn Stadium, Holborn, London, England	Retained IBU heavyweight title
95	Win	78–11–5 (1)	Jean Croissilles	KO	2 (20)	29 September 1919	25 years, 260 days	Teatro Bellas Artes, San Sebastian, País Vasco, Spain	
94	Win	77–11–5 (1)	Dick Smith	KO	8 (20)	19 July 1919	25 years, 188 days	Cirque de Paris, Paris, France	Retained IBU light-heavyweight title
93	Win	76–11–5 (1)	Kid Jackson	DQ	4 (15)	26 July 1914	20 years, 195 days	Bordeaux, Gironde, France	Jackson was disqualified for hitting low
92	Win	75–11–5 (1)	Gunboat Smith	DQ	6 (20)	16 July 1914	20 years, 185 days	Olympia, Kensington, London, England	Won 'white' world heavyweight title
91	Win	74–11–5 (1)	Battling Robinson	KO	3 (?)	14 June 1914	20 years, 153 days	Place du Champ-de-Mars, Beziers, Hérault, France	
90	Win	73–11–5 (1)	Hubert Roc	KO	2 (12)	31 May 1914	20 years, 139 days	Hippodrome, Valenciennes, Nord, France	
89	Win	72–11–5 (1)	George Mitchell	TKO	1 (6)	14 April 1914	20 years, 92 days	Salle Lerda, Paris, France	
88	Win	71–11–5 (1)	Irish O'Mara	KO	2 (15)	13 April 1914	20 years, 91 days	Blois, Loir-et-Cher, France	
87	Loss	70–11–5 (1)	Joe Jeannette	PTS	15	21 March 1914	20 years, 68 days	Luna Parc, Porte Maillot, Paris, France	
86	Win	70–10–5 (1)	Pat O'Keeffe	KO	2 (15)	19 January 1914	20 years, 7 days	Eldorado-Casino, Nice, Alpes-Maritimes, France	
85	Win	69–10–5 (1)	Bombardier Billy Wells	KO	1 (20)	8 December 1913	19 years, 330 days	National Sporting Club, Covent Garden, London, England	Retained IBU heavyweight title
84	Win	68–10–5 (1)	Max Abbat	KO	3 (12)	31 October 1913	19 years, 292 days	Kursaal de Genève, Geneva, Switzerland	
83	Win	67–10–5 (1)	Jeff Smith	PTS	20	11 October 1913	19 years, 272 days	Luna Park Arena, Paris, France	
82	Win	66–10–5 (1)	Ashley Williams	KO	4 (12)	6 August 1913	19 years, 206 days	Casino-Kursaal, Vichy, Allier, France	
81	Win	65–10–5 (1)	Albert Lurie	TKO	3 (?)	29 June 1913	19 years, 168 days	Arènes de la Benatte, Bordeaux, Gironde, France	
80	Win	64–10–5 (1)	Bombardier Billy Wells	KO	4 (20)	1 June 1913	19 years, 140 days	Feestpaleis, Ghent, Oost-Vlaanderen, Belgium	Won inaugural IBU heavyweight title
79	Win	63–10–5 (1)	George Gunther	PTS	15	17 March 1913	19 years, 64 days	Eldorado-Casino, Nice, Alpes-Maritimes, France	
78	Win	62–10–5 (1)	Willy Schoot	KO	2 (10)	8 March 1913	19 years, 55 days	Casino-Palace, Roubaix, Nord, France	
77	Win	61–10–5 (1)	Cyclone Smith	KO	3 (20)	1 March 1913	19 years, 48 days	Eldorado-Casino, Nice, Alpes-Maritimes, France	
76	Win	60–10–5 (1)	Bandsman Dick Rice	KO	2 (20)	12 February 1913	19 years, 31 days	Grand Hall des Magasins Généraux, Dieppe, Seine-Maritime, France	Won inaugural IBU light-heavyweight title
75	Win	59–10–5 (1)	Marcel Moreau	TKO	8 (20)	8 January 1913	18 years, 362 days	Grand Hall des Magasins Généraux, Dieppe, Seine-Maritime, France	
74	Loss	58–10–5 (1)	Billy Papke	TKO	18 (20)	23 October 1912	18 years, 285 days	Grand Hall des Magasins Généraux, Dieppe, Seine-Maritime, France	For world middlweight title claim
73	Loss	58–9–5 (1)	Frank Klaus	DQ	19 (20)	24 June 1912	18 years, 164 days	Grand Hall des Magasins Généraux, Dieppe, Seine-Maritime, France	Lost world middleweight title claim For world middleweight title
72	Win	58–8–5 (1)	Willie Lewis	PTS	20	22 May 1912	18 years, 131 days	Cirque de Paris, Paris, France	Retained IBU and world middleweight title claim
71	Win	57–8–5 (1)	Hubert Roc	KO	6 (?)	10 May 1912	18 years, 119 days	Apollo-Théâtre, Marseille, Bouches-du-Rhône, France	
70	Win	56–8–5 (1)	George Gunther	PTS	20	3 April 1912	18 years, 82 days	Cirque de Paris, Paris, France	Retained IBU and world middleweight title claim
69	Win	55–8–5 (1)	Jim Sullivan	KO	2 (20)	29 February 1912	18 years, 48 days	Stand de la Condamine, Monte Carlo, Monaco	Retained world middlweight title claim Won inaugural IBU middleweight title
68	Win	54–8–5 (1)	Charles Bradley	KO	2 (?)	27 January 1912	18 years, 15 days	Hippodrome Lillois, Lille, Nord, France	
67	Win	53–8–5 (1)	Battling Lacroix	TKO	6 (15)	17 January 1912	18 years, 5 days	Salle du Grand Skating-Rouennais, Rouen, Seine-Maritime, France	
66	Win	52–8–5 (1)	Battling Taylor	KO	4 (?)	13 January 1912	18 years, 1 day	Hippodrome Lillois, Lille, Nord, France	
65	Win	51–8–5 (1)	Harry Lewis	PTS	20	13 December 1911	17 years, 335 days	Cirque de Paris, Paris, France	
64	Win	50–8–5 (1)	Battling Lacroix	KO	9 (15)	25 November 1911	17 years, 317 days	Hippodrome Lillois, Lille, Nord, France	
63	Win	49–8–5 (1)	Theo Gray	KO	9 (?)	17 November 1911	17 years, 309 days	Boulogne-sur-Mer, Pas-de-Calais, France	
62	Win	48–8–5 (1)	Young Joseph	RTD	10 (20)	23 October 1911	17 years, 284 days	Empress Rink, Earl's Court, London, England	Won inaugural IBU welterweight title
61	Win	47–8–5 (1)	Sid Burns	PTS	15	2 October 1911	17 years, 263 days	Empress Rink, Earl's Court, London, England	
60	Loss	46–8–5 (1)	Dixie Kid	TKO	5 (15)	19 August 1911	17 years, 219 days	Trouville, Calvados, France	
59	Win	46–7–5 (1)	Arthur Evernden	PTS	15	14 August 1911	17 years, 214 days	Cabourg, Calvados, France	
58	Win	45–7–5 (1)	Jack Goldswain	KO	4 (15)	23 June 1911	17 years, 162 days	Skating de la Rue Edinbourg, Paris, France	
57	Win	44–7–5 (1)	Robert Eustache	TKO	16 (20)	10 June 1911	17 years, 149 days	Cirque de Paris, Paris, France	Won vacant France welterweight title
56	Win	43–7–5 (1)	Frank Loughrey	PTS	15	20 May 1911	17 years, 128 days	Cirque de Paris, Paris, France	
55	Win	42–7–5 (1)	Henri Marchand	KO	6 (15)	23 April 1911	17 years, 101 days	Arras, Pas-de-Calais, France	
54	Win	41–7–5 (1)	George Colbourne	PTS	10	8 April 1911	17 years, 86 days	Palais Baudouin, Brussels, Bruxelles-Capitale, Belgium	
53	Win	40–7–5 (1)	Sid Stagg	PTS	10	1 April 1911	17 years, 79 days	Franco-American Skating Rink, Roubaix, Nord, France	
52	Win	39–7–5 (1)	Jack Meekins	PTS	10	25 March 1911	17 years, 72 days	Wonderland, Paris, France	
51	Win	38–7–5 (1)	Henri Marchand	KO	6 (?)	15 March 1911	17 years, 62 days	Liege, Belgium	
50	Win	37–7–5 (1)	Harry Staessens	KO	1 (10)	12 March 1911	17 years, 59 days	Théâtre des Associations, Lens, Pas-de-Calais, France	
49	Win	36–7–5 (1)	Young Nipper	PTS	8	1 March 1911	17 years, 48 days	Hippodrome, Paris, Paris, France	
48	Loss	35–7–5 (1)	Henri Piet	PTS	10	27 January 1911	17 years, 15 days	Cirque de Paris, Paris, France	
47	Win	35–6–5 (1)	George Randall	KO	5 (15)	14 January 1911	17 years, 2 days	Wonderland, Paris, France	
46	Win	34–6–5 (1)	Edouard Brochet	KO	7 (15)	8 January 1911	16 years, 361 days	Théâtre des Associations, Lens, Pas-de-Calais, France	
45	Win	33–6–5 (1)	Jack Daniels	PTS	10	17 December 1910	16 years, 339 days	Wonderland, Paris, France	
44	Win	32–6–5 (1)	Henri Demlen	PTS	10	3 December 1910	16 years, 325 days	Theatre Lyrique, Schaerbeek, Bruxelles-Capitale, Belgium	
43	Win	31–6–5 (1)	George Randall	TKO	10 (10)	19 November 1910	16 years, 311 days	Wonderland, Paris, France	
42	Win	30–6–5 (1)	Young Williams	KO	7 (?)	6 November 1910	16 years, 298 days	Arras, Pas-de-Calais, France	
41	Win	29–6–5 (1)	Jim Campbell	KO	5 (10)	22 October 1910	16 years, 283 days	Wonderland, Paris, France	
40	Win	28–6–5 (1)	Percy Wilson	PTS	10	15 October 1910	16 years, 276 days	Wonderland, Paris, France	
39	Draw	27–6–5 (1)	Jean Audouy	PTS	10	8 October 1910	16 years, 269 days	Theatre Lyrique, Schaerbeek, Bruxelles-Capitale, Belgium	
38	Win	27–6–4 (1)	Fernand Cuny	TKO	8 (?)	13 August 1910	16 years, 213 days	Cabourg, Calvados, France	
37	Win	26–6–4 (1)	Hubert Baelen	KO	2 (?)	17 July 1910	16 years, 186 days	Lille, Nord, France	
36	Draw	25–6–4 (1)	Paul Til	PTS	15	8 July 1910	16 years, 177 days	Pepiniere, Paris, France	
35	Win	25–6–3 (1)	Louis Achille	KO	6 (10)	11 June 1910	16 years, 150 days	Salon de l'Alcazar, Lievin, Pas-de-Calais, France	
34	Loss	24–6–3 (1)	Fernand Cuny	TKO	13 (?)	16 April 1910	16 years, 94 days	Bordeaux, Gironde, France	
33	Loss	24–5–3 (1)	Ted Broadribb	TKO	4 (?)	9 April 1910	16 years, 87 days	Wonderland, Paris, France	
32	Win	24–4–3 (1)	Georges Gloria	KO	8 (?)	3 April 1910	16 years, 81 days	Lens, Pas-de-Calais, France	
31	Win	23–4–3 (1)	Fernand Cuny	PTS	10	26 March 1910	16 years, 73 days	Nouvel-Alcazar, Lyon, Rhône, France	
30	Win	22–4–3 (1)	Louis Achille	KO	5 (10)	20 March 1910	16 years, 67 days	Hippodrome Municipal, Douai, Nord, France	
29	Loss	21–4–3 (1)	Buck Shine	PTS	10	12 March 1910	16 years, 59 days	Palais Baudouin, Brussels, Bruxelles-Capitale, Belgium	
28	Win	21–3–3 (1)	Wally Pickard	KO	8 (10)	5 February 1910	16 years, 24 days	Palais Baudouin, Brussels, Bruxelles-Capitale, Belgium	
27	NC	20–3–3 (1)	Paul Til	NC	8 (15)	14 January 1910	16 years, 2 days	Élysée Montmartre, Paris, France	No decision was given after an accidental clash of heads left Til unable to continue
26	Win	20–3–3	Georges Gaillard	PTS	10	8 January 1910	15 years, 361 days	Théâtre des Associations, Lens, Pas-de-Calais, France	
25	Win	19–3–3	Young Warner	DQ	7 (10)	5 January 1910	15 years, 358 days	Tivoli Boxing-Hall, Paris, France	
24	Win	18–3–3	Paul Til	PTS	10	22 December 1909	15 years, 344 days	Tivoli Boxing-Hall, Paris, France	
23	Win	17–3–3	Georges Gaillard	PTS	6	8 December 1909	15 years, 330 days	Tivoli Boxing-Hall, Paris, France	
22	Loss	16–3–3	Paul Til	TKO	8 (20)	27 November 1909	15 years, 319 days	Hippodrome Lillois, Lille, Nord, France	For vacant France bantamweight title
21	Win	16–2–3	Charles Ledoux	PTS	15	24 November 1909	15 years, 316 days	Tivoli Boxing-Hall, Paris, France	
20	Win	15–2–3	Joseph Lampin	KO	7 (?)	8 November 1909	15 years, 300 days	Henin-Beaumont, Pas-de-Calais, France	
19	Win	14–2–3	Lucien Dorgueille	PTS	10	23 October 1909	15 years, 284 days	Wonderland, Paris, France	
18	Draw	13–2–3	Paul Til	PTS	10	16 October 1909	15 years, 277 days	Hippodrome Lillois, Lille, Nord, France	For vacant France bantamweight title
17	Win	13–2–2	Omer Hellebout	TKO	5 (10)	11 October 1909	15 years, 272 days	Salle Desruelles, Roubaix, Nord, France	
16	Win	12–2–2	Joseph Lampin	KO	5 (10)	28 August 1909	15 years, 75 days	Théâtre du Café Dubois, Denain, Nord, France	
15	Win	11–2–2	Lucien Dorgueille	KO	11 (15)	21 August 1909	15 years, 221 days	Salle Beudaert, Lille, Nord, France	
14	Win	10–2–2	Emile Wetinck	KO	1 (?)	26 June 1909	15 years, 165 days	Lille, Nord, France	
13	Win	9–2–2	Joseph Lampin	KO	10 (10)	20 May 1909	15 years, 128 days	Valenciennes, Nord, France	
12	Win	8–2–2	Auguste Relinger	PTS	6	17 May 1909	15 years, 125 days	Hippodrome-Théâtre, Roubaix, Nord, France	
11	Win	7–2–2	F. Cheveau	PTS	6	25 April 1909	15 years, 103 days	Vélodrome Roubaisien, Roubaix, Nord, France	
10	Win	6–2–2	Achalme	PTS	10	18 March 1909	15 years, 65 days	Lens, Pas-de-Calais, France	
9	Draw	5–2–2	Charles Legrand	PTS	20	28 February 1909	15 years, 47 days	Théâtre des Associations, Lens, Pas-de-Calais, France	
8	Win	5–2–1	Gaston Simon	PTS	10	25 February 1909	15 years, 44 days	Paris, France	
7	Loss	4–2–1	Georges Gloria	KO	6 (?)	19 February 1909	15 years, 38 days	Paris, France	
6	Win	4–1–1	Charles Legrand	PTS	15	10 January 1909	14 years, 364 days	Théâtre des Associations, Lens, Pas-de-Calais, France	
5	Draw	3–1–1	Charles Legrand	PTS	6	5 December 1908	14 years, 328 days	Bethune, Pas-de-Calais, France	
4	Win	3–1	Gaston Simon	PTS	6	3 December 1908	14 years, 326 days	Tivoli Boxing-Hall, Paris, France	
3	Win	2–1	Louis Lépine	PTS	6	3 December 1908	14 years, 326 days	Tivoli Boxing-Hall, Paris, France	
2	Loss	1–1	Ed Salmon	TKO	18 (20)	30 November 1908	14 years, 323 days	Cafe de Paris, Maisons-Lafitte, Val-de-Marne, France	
1	Win	1–0	Ed Salmon	DQ	13 (20)	1 November 1908	14 years, 294 days	Cafe de Paris, Maisons-Lafitte, Val-de-Marne, France	

== Titles in boxing ==
=== Major world titles ===
- World light heavyweight champion (Note: As the NBA (WBA) was not yet formed until 1921, Carpentier was considered the "World" light heavyweight champion along with winning the vacant NYSAC title after defeating Battling Levinsky on 12 October 1920.) (175 lbs)
- NYSAC light heavyweight champion (175 lbs)
- NBA (WBA) light heavyweight champion (Note: Awarded inaugural title in January 1921.) (175 lbs)

=== Regional/International titles ===
- France welterweight champion (147 lbs)
- European welterweight champion (Note: Inaugural champion.) (147 lbs)
- European middleweight champion (160 lbs)
- European light heavyweight champion (175 lbs)
- European heavyweight champion (200+ lbs) (2×)
- France heavyweight champion (200+ lbs)

=== Undisputed titles ===
- Undisputed light heavyweight champion (Note: Became the first ever undisputed light heavyweight champion after being awarded the inaugural NBA light heavyweight title in January 1921.)

== See also ==
- List of light heavyweight boxing champions

== Notes and references ==
=== References ===
Achievements
Regional boxing titles
New title	European Light Heavyweight Champion; 12 February 1913 – 24 September 1922	Succeeded by Battling Siki
World boxing titles
Preceded by Battling Levinsky	World Light Heavyweight Champion; 12 October 1920 – 24 September 1922	Succeeded by Battling Siki
Titles in pretence
Vacant	World Middleweight Champion; 29 February 1912 - 24 June 1912	claim unified by Frank Klaus
Preceded by Gunboat Smith	World White Heavyweight Champion; 16 July 1914 - 5 April 1915	Title defunct when Jess Willard wins World Championship
