= Fred Storbeck =

South African boxer

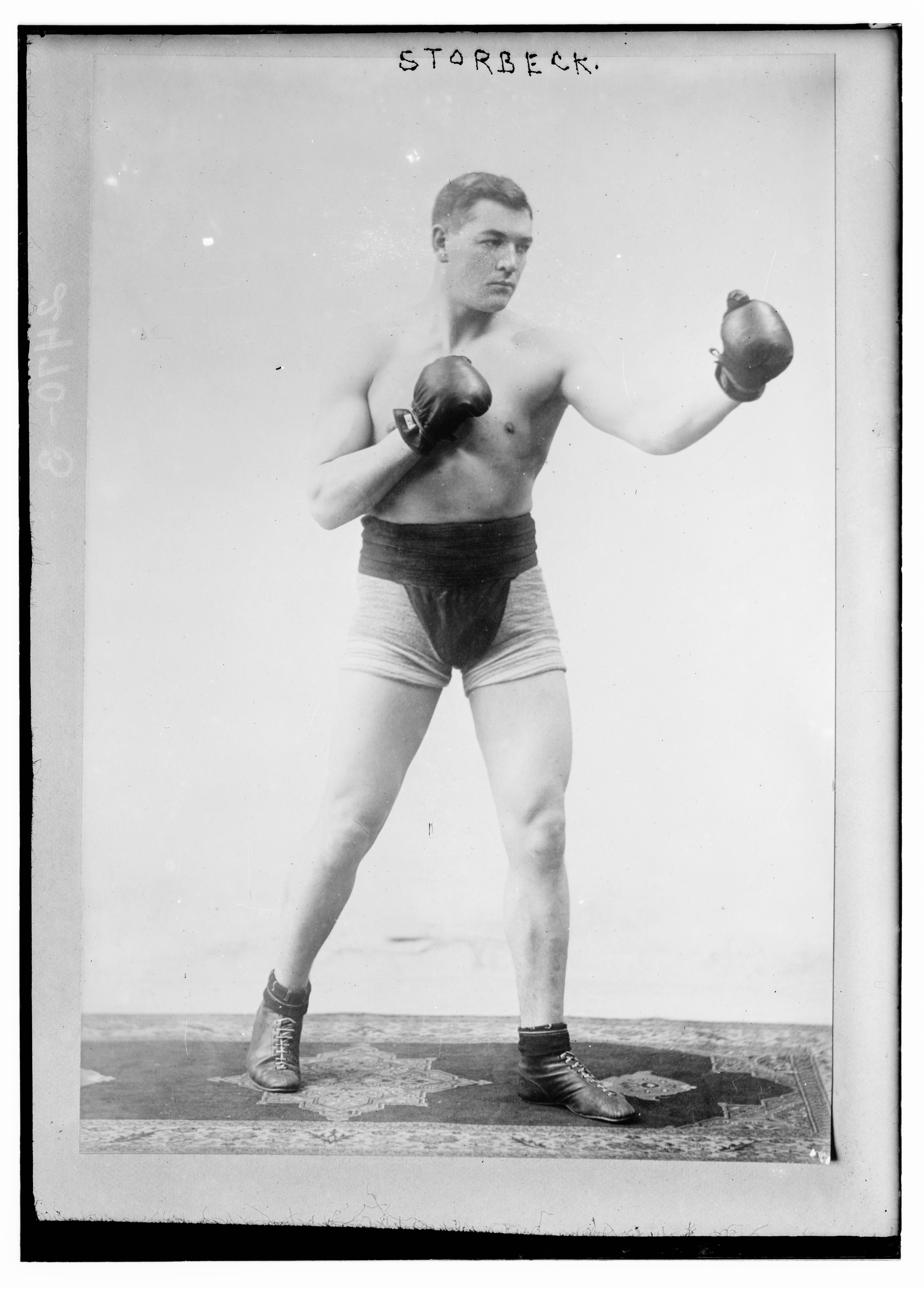

Personal information
- Nationality: South African
- Born: Fred Storbeck; 10 August 1889 Pretoria, South African Republic
- Died: 7 December 1970 (aged 81)
- Height: 6 ft 0 in (1.83 m)
- Weight: heavyweight

Boxing career

Boxing record
- Total fights: 24
- Wins: 10 (KO 3)
- Losses: 13 (KO 6)
- No contests: 1

Fred Storbeck (10 August 1889 – 7 December 1970 (aged 81)) born in Pretoria was a South African Boer blacksmith, and amateur and professional heavyweight boxer of the 1910s, and 1920s, who won the South African heavyweight title, and British Empire heavyweight title.

== Boxing career ==
=== Amateur ===
Early in 1910 the Transvaal Province amateur boxing authorities sent three representatives to compete in the British championships. Heavyweight Fred Storbeck, lightweight Jim Fennessy and featherweight Joe Thomas, with George Twomey as the manager of the first-ever team of South African amateur boxers to compete overseas. In the British championships Storbeck won all his fights on knockouts and became the 1910 British amateur heavyweight champion. Fennessy reached the semi-final and Thomas was eliminated in the second round of the competition.

=== Professional ===
Fred Storbeck's first professional boxing bout was a knockout victory over Bill Chase at the National Sporting Club, London on 29 May 1911, this was followed by fights including; a no contest with Matthew Curran for the British Empire heavyweight title, a knockout defeat by Bombardier Billy Wells for the British Empire heavyweight title, "during the contest, Storbeck offended Wells by swearing at him. This reaction betrays perhaps unexpected sensitivity in a former ranker, but the English heavyweight almost literally made the South African eat his words by repeatedly ramming a straight left like a telegraph pole into Storbeck's mouth for the remainder of the fight", a disqualification defeat by Frank Moran (US) at The Ring, Blackfriars Road, London on 1 January 1912, a disqualification victory over Matthew Curran for the British Empire heavyweight title, a knockout defeat by Frank Moran (USA) at The Ring, Blackfriars Road, London on 5 February 1912, one win, a points victory over "Battling" Jim Johnson (USA) at Liverpool Stadium on 4 April 1912, this bout was unusual in that "Battling" Jim Johnson was an African American boxer and the colour bar was still generally upheld, following two wins, Storbeck then travelled to the United States, with a technical knockout defeat by Jim Stewart at Madison Square Garden, New York City on 8 July 1912, Storbeck then travelled home to South Africa, with a disqualification defeat by Mike Williams for the South African heavyweight title, a disqualification defeat by Jack Lalor for the South African heavyweight title, a knockout victory over Mike Williams for the South African heavyweight title, a disqualification defeat by Jack Lalor defending the South African heavyweight title, Storbeck then travelled to Australia, with a disqualification victory over Bill Lang at Sydney Sports Ground on 5 October 1914, a technical knockout defeat by Ben Doyle at Sydney Stadium on 31 October 1914, a disqualification defeat by Pat Doran at Baker's Pavilion, Melbourne on 28 November 1914, a disqualification victory over Arthur Brown at Sydney Stadium on 15 February 1915, a disqualification defeat by Jerry Jerome at Baker's Pavilion, Melbourne on 6 March 1915, a knockout defeat by Sid Neilson at Adelphi Hall, Maitland, New South Wales on 1 May 1915, Storbeck then travelled home to South Africa, with a points victory over Johnny Rutherford for the vacant South African heavyweight title, a disqualification defeat by Nick van den Bergh for the South African heavyweight title, Fred Storbeck's final professional boxing bout was a knockout defeat by Johnny Squires at City Hall, Johannesburg on 29 August 1921.
