= The Silver Lining (1919 film) =

- Directed by: A. E. Coleby
- Starring: Billy Wells; Ella Milne; Richard Buttery
- Production company: I. B. Davidson
- Distributed by: Gaumont British Distributors
- Release date: November 1919
- Country: United Kingdom
- Languages: Silent; English intertitles

The Silver Lining is a 1919 British silent sports film directed by A. E. Coleby and starring Billy Wells, Ella Milne and Richard Buttery. It is set in the world of horseracing.

== Cast ==
- Billy Wells as Jerrold O'Farrell
- Ella Milne as Pamela Hillsbury
- Richard Buttery as Jack Hillsbury
- Warwick Ward as Mark Cathcart
- Ralph Forster as Sir Thomas Hillsbury
- George Harrington as Mr. Hamilton
- Doris Paxman as Sybil Harrington
- Henry Nicholls-Bates as Mr. Spagnoli
- Olive Bell as Mrs. Spagnoli

== Bibliography ==
- Low, Rachel. The History of British Film: Volume IV, 1918–1929. Routledge, 1997.
