= Gunner Moir =

English boxer

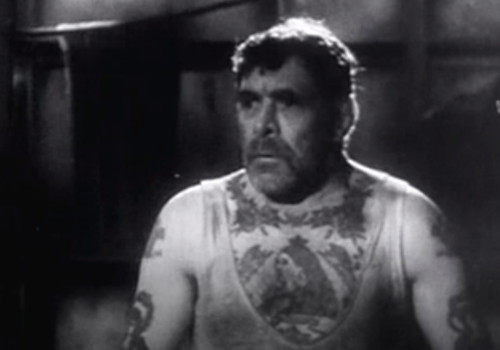
- Moir in the 1936 Hammer Films production Phantom Ship

Personal information
- Nationality: British
- Born: James Moir; 17 April 1879 Lambeth, London, England
- Died: 12 June 1939 (aged 60) Sutton, Surrey, England
- Weight: Heavyweight

Boxing career

Boxing record
- Total fights: 25
- Wins: 14
- Win by KO: 10
- Losses: 11
- Draws: 0

James Moir (17 April 1879 – 12 June 1939), better known as Gunner Moir and sometimes as "Ex Gunner" James Moir, was an English heavyweight boxer. He was British champion from 1906 to 1909 and challenged Tommy Burns for the world title. After retiring from boxing he took up acting, appearing in several films in the 1930s.

== Career ==
Born in Lambeth, London, Moir began his boxing career whilst serving in the British Army in India. He was trained by the trainer Dai Dollings and the wrestler Sid Grumley from Shepherds Bush. When he returned to England in 1903 he was the Heavyweight Champion of the British Army in India. His first recorded professional fight took place in 1903, a win over Fred Barrett. After losing his next three fights he won his next eight, including a win over former Australian champion Peter Felix in 1905, which led to him challenging for the title of British Champion, which he won by defeating defending champion Jack Palmer in 1906.

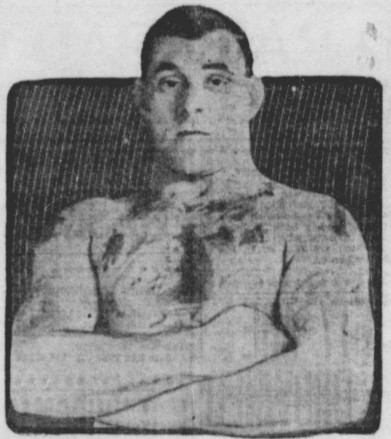
Mior, circa 1907

Moir's success led to commercial ventures such as the Gunner Moir boxing glove, and he appeared in a newspaper advertising campaign for Phosferine tonic, which continued for several years. He also trained the wrestler George Hackenschmidt. He successfully defended the title against Tiger Jack Smith, leading to a fight for Tommy Burns' world title on 2 December 1907 at the National Sporting Club — the first world heavyweight title fight to be held outside the US; Burns retained his title in 10 rounds after knocking down the taller and heavier Moir twice in the first two rounds. Burns subsequently claimed to have prolonged the fight in order to increase the value of the film rights to the fight, which he held.

Moir lost his national title to "Iron" Hague in his next fight in 1909, which also had the EBU European title at stake. In February 1910 Moir defeated former Australian heavyweight champion Arthur Cripps. This earned Moir a fight against P.O. Matthew Curran in May 1910 for the British Heavyweight title which he lost via disqualification for hitting after the bell. Moir was given another shot at the British title against Bombardier Billy Wells in January 1911 with Moir winning and regaining the title.

In March 1911 Moir fought Porky Dan Flynn losing by disqualification after throwing Flynn. In September 1912 Moir was given another shot at the British title in a rematch against Matthew Curran, but was defeated. Moir retired from boxing in 1913 after unsuccessfully challenging Bombardier Billy Wells whom he had beaten three years earlier.

In 1922 he was fined £500 for slander after allegations regarding motor-lamp maker William Nelson and Moir's son, James. Moir unsuccessfully appealed the verdict in 1923. He failed to pay, and was taken to court by Nelson in 1924, where he stated that he was unable to pay, now earning only £7 a week and with a wife and six children to support; He was ordered to pay the money at £4 a month.

Moir went on to work as manager of the Canterbury Music Hall in London. He wrote an instructional book, The Complete Boxer, which was published in 1930, and subsequently took up acting, appearing in films such as Third Time Lucky (1931), Madame Guillotine (1931), and The Mystery of the Mary Celeste (1935).

He died on 12 June 1939 in hospital in Sutton, Surrey after a long illness, aged 60.
