= Johnny Liddell (footballer, born 1915) =

Scottish footballer (1915–1986)

Personal information
- Full name: John Gilbert Hay Liddell
- Date of birth: 17 April 1915
- Place of birth: Edinburgh, Scotland
- Date of death: March 1986 (aged 70)
- Place of death: Greenwich, England
- Height: 5 ft 10 1/2 in (1.79 m)
- Position: Inside forward

Senior career*
Years	Team	Apps	(Gls)
–1939	Dunbar United		
1939–1944	Airdrieonians	0	(0)
1944–1946	Leyton Orient	0	(0)
1946–1947	Bolton Wanderers	0	(0)
1947	Brighton & Hove Albion	4	(1)
- Gravesend & Northfleet
- Hastings United
- * Club domestic league appearances and goals

John Gilbert Hay Liddell (17 April 1915 – March 1986) was a Scottish professional footballer who played in the Football League for Brighton & Hove Albion as an inside forward. He began his career with Dunbar United and is the club's second-leading all-time goalscorer, with 155 (scored in 146 appearances).
