= Holborn Theatre =

Former theatre in central London

Coordinates: 51.5179°N 0.1178°W

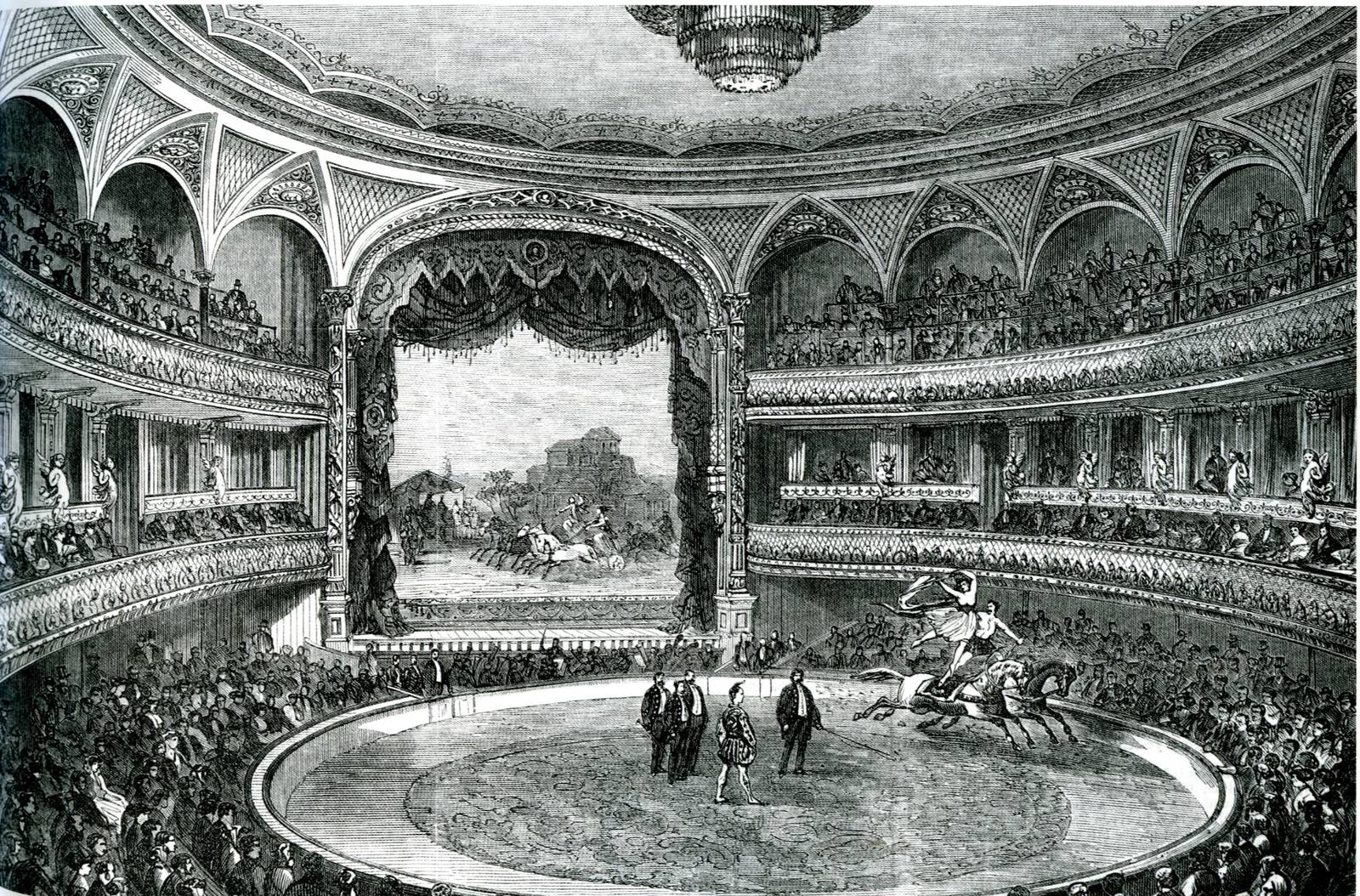
The New Royal Amphitheatre in The Illustrated London News (June 1867) showing the equestrian ring with the small stage behind

The Holborn Theatre was a theatre on High Holborn in London which opened in 1867 as the New Royal Amphitheatre and operated as an equestrian ring and theatre until 1886. During its short existence the theatre underwent numerous name changes, becoming the Holborn Theatre in 1884.

== Design ==
Located at 85 High Holborn, the venue opened on 25 May 1867 as the New Royal Amphitheatre under the management of Thomas M'Collum (or McCollum, 1828 - 1872), a much admired American-born two horse rider and circus owner. M'Collum took out a 55-year lease on the new venue with his business partner William Charmen. The theatre was built by Thomas Ennor and designed by architect Thomas Smith. In its May 1867 edition The Building News and Engineering Journal commented on the construction of the new theatre, stating: 'A spirited attempt is about to be made to revive the glories of the peaceful sawdust ring. On the site of the Metropolitan Horse Bazaar, Holborn (nearly opposite the Inns of Court Hotel), is now rapidly progressing towards completion an amphitheatre, which will vie with any building in London in the beauty and elegance of its decorations and its admirable arrangements for the safety and comfort of the public. The Royal Amphitheatre, which will be under the management of Mr. Thomas M'Collum, is announced to be opened on the 25th inst.'

The curve of the amphitheatre was extremely imposing with its ceiling constructed of stretched and illuminated canvas with a large centre flower radiating from the sunlight. There were two separate sets of stables for the equestrian events and sixteen dressing rooms for use by both the equestrians artistes and the actors. The opening night audience saw a variety of equestrian, vaudeville and dramatic performances.

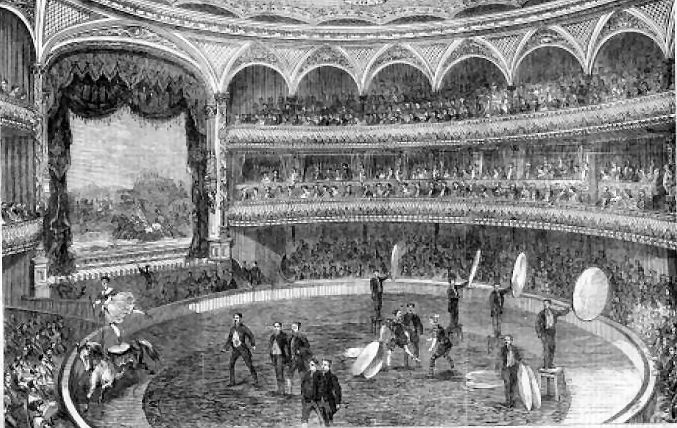
An equestrian act performing at The New Royal Amphitheatre - The Illustrated London News (June 1867)

The theatre was 76 ft wide and 130 ft in length and had three entrances: the Grand entrance was wide and roomy with arches to support the ceiling and was decorated in the Pompeian style. An 'extremely handsome stone staircase' with carved balustrades lead to the boxes. All three entrances were fireproof and all the staircases were constructed of stone; especial care was taken to provide facilities for clearing the building in a few minutes in case of fire, while various doorways and entrances were also fitted with steel shutters. Inside, the width across the auditorium from box to box was 60 ft, while the Royal Box was located in the centre of the house facing the stage, with its retiring room immediately behind. There were no stage boxes as the architect discovered that anyone seated in the second row in a stage box would not be able to see the stage or the ring of the amphitheatre. Instead, Smith used a different design, placing the dress circle at the side where the private boxes would normally have been placed, and put the private boxes in front of the house. Also, Smith placed one row of stalls holding 200 patrons with flip-up seats in front of the 26 private boxes which ran entirely round the house. The amphitheatre held about 700 people. The front row in the gallery held 150 stalls, with each seat having a stuffed cushion with a comfortable back. The remainder of the gallery seated about 550 people with standing room for about 200 more and had a large promenade fifteen feet wide behind. The stage was only 20 feet deep, but the owners considered this adequate for the type of plays they intended to stage. Before the stage was the orchestra pit from which music could be provided for both dramatic performances on the stage and equestrian displays in the ring. A crystal sunlight 9 feet in diameter and holding 900 gas burners was designed to illuminate the whole auditorium.

== Performances ==
The operetta La Vie parisienne by Offenbach received its English premiere at the theatre in March 1872 in an adaptation by F. C. Burnand and with a cast that included Lionel Brough. During its existence the venue offered a wide mixture of performances, starting with circus style acts and from 1873 presenting farce, ballet and dramas. In 1884 the theatre closed after a riot and reopened the following year after being redecorated and receiving new seating - with capacity increased to 1,000 gallery seats and 1,000 pit seats.

The venue closed as a theatre in 1886 and was from the 1930s until the second world war the Stadium boxing and sports club owned by mayor of Holdborn Fred Howard.

The building was damaged by bombing in February 1941 during World War II and was later demolished and the site cleared.

== Other names ==
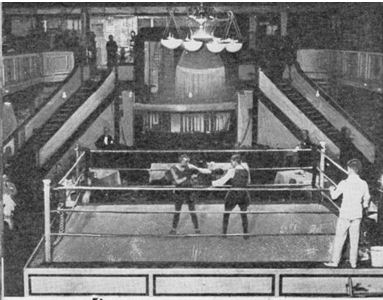
A boxing match in the Holborn Stadium c1905

At various times the theatre was known as: The New Royal Amphitheatre (1867); the Royal Amphitheatre and Circus (1867); the Grand Cirque & Amphitheatre (1873); the National Amphitheatre (1873); Newsome's Circus (1874); the Holborn Amphitheatre (1874) - under the management of John Hollingshead; the Grand Central Skating Rink (1876-7); Hamilton's Royal Amphitheatre (1878); the Royal Connaught Theatre (1879); the Alcazar Theatre (1882); The International Theatre (1883), and the Holborn Theatre (1884). The venue ceased to perform live theatre in 1886, after which it was variously called The West Central Hall; Holborn Stadium, the National Sporting Club and The Stadium Club. It was here at the Holborn Stadium in 1907 during the Tommy Burns-Gunner Moir fight that Eugene Corri became the first British referee to officiate inside the boxing ring, while as The Stadium Club the venue became a popular boxing venue and was the setting for a match in Hitchcock's film The Ring (1927), although the scene was probably filmed on a set at Elstree Studios.
