= Frank Goddard =

British boxer (1891–1957)

Percy Frank Goddard (27 November 1891- 8 December 1957) was a British boxer who became the heavyweight boxing champion in 1923. Goddard's career begin in 1914 and it soon became apparent that he was one of the best boxers in the UK. He became the British heavyweight boxing champion on 26 May 1919 having beaten Jack Curphey for the vacant British Boxing Board of Control (BBBofC) British heavyweight title. Goddard lost the British heavyweight championship on 17 June 1919 to Joe Beckett.

Goddard won back the title on 21 November 1923, beating Jack Bloomfield to win the vacant BBBofC British heavyweight title. On 29 May 1924, Goddard made a successful defence of the title against Jack Stanley at the Royal Albert Hall. He fought his last fight against Phil Scott on 18 March 1926, losing his title and ending his career. After his retirement he lived in The Cross Inn, Great Bromley, Essex. It was detailed on his death certificate that he was "formerly a publican".
