= William Hague (boxer) =

James William "Iron" Hague (6 November 1885 – 18 August 1951) was a boxer born in Mexborough, West Riding of Yorkshire. He was the British heavyweight champion between 1909 and 1911.

== Family and early life ==
James William "Iron" Hague was the oldest of six children of John Hague and Ann (Annie) Bennet Hague, who were married on 30 August 1885. John was a coal miner, and Ann was the daughter of a barman. Ann's father, William Bennet, was known in cricket circles, and her brother, William 'Mickey' Bennet, was center forward for Sheffield. James was baptized on 20 June 1886.

Hague earned his nickname after a schoolyard spat left him bleeding from a head wound. He tried to cover it with his scarf and cap, but his teacher asked him to remove the wraps, and upon seeing the wound said, "you must be made of iron, lad!"

Hague first worked at a colliery, and then at a glassworks before being scouted in 1904. He had previously won several pickup fights at fair days, beginning in 1899.

Hague married Lucy Law (11 September 1886 - 16 May 1946) on 27 October 1909 in Mexborough, Yorkshire (West Riding), England. They had at least two children, Jane and Agnes Ann.

== Boxing career ==
Hague began his professional boxing career in 1904 at the Volunteer Drill Hall in Doncaster. He went on to win his heavyweight title in 1909, lost it in 1911, and retired from boxing in 1915.

=== Heavyweight championship ===
Hague fought for the Yorkshire heavyweight title against Dick Parkes at Doncaster on 8 April 1905, winning in the fifth round. He went on to beat a steady stream of English heavyweights, many by knockouts. He was invited to enter the Heavyweight Novice competition held at the National Sporting Club, London in January 1908. This was a series of fights of three rounds only. He won this with a series of knockouts. After a few more wins he was invited to fight Gunner Jim Moir for the English Heavyweight title on 19 April 1909. He won this in the first round with a knockout in 2 minutes and 47 seconds, creating a new boxing record for the fastest victory of a title. His homecoming was a splendid affair, with thousands lining the streets of his home town.

=== Match with Sam Langford ===
On 24 May 1909, shortly after winning the title, Hague agreed to fight Sam Langford, the Black boxer from Canada at the National Sporting Club in Covent Garden, London. Langford is rated as being in the top 10 fighters of all time. Hague, controversially at the time, did not believe in a 'colour bar' for boxing. He was quoted as saying that "unless all men are allowed to freely compete, how can you ever find the true champion?" Hague weighed in at about 196 pounds, while Langford weighed about 158 pounds. The match lasted four rounds, with Langford knocking Hague out one minute and forty-nine seconds into the fourth round. Langford said in later years that in all his time in boxing no one hit him as hard as the punch he took from "Iron" Hague in the second round, which knocked him over. This huge left from Hague knocked Langford down and he only just managed to rally. Hague had broken his hand with the punch, which marred his performance thereafter.

=== Defending championship ===
He defended the title once against Bill Chase, knocking him out in the sixth round. Hague lost his title on 24 April 1911 to the up-and-coming Bombardier Billy Wells for the first Lonsdale Belt. For this fight Hague weighed in at about 196 pounds, and lasted into the sixth round. Wells took Hague down in the fourth round, and finished with multiple right hooks to Hague's jaw in the sixth.

=== Post-championship ===
Hague boxed irregularly from 1912 through 1915. Hague joined the Grenadier Guards in 1914, and began boxing again during his time in the military. One was against Henry Curzon at the Chelsea Football Fields in 1915. His last match was against Joe Mills (Joe Tampling) at the Artillery Depot, Harfleur, at the end of 1915. The match ended with Mills dying in hospital from concussion. Hague vowed afterwards never again to lace on a glove and so ended his career.

== Retirement ==
After retiring from boxing, Hague continued to serve in the military through 1919 and went on to become a Publican. He took the King's shilling in the First World War and joined the Grenadier Guards. He saw military action in several battles such as the Somme and Passchendaele.

He also did work as a film extra.

Hague died in his daughter's arms in Mexborough aged 65 on 18 August 1951. He is buried in Mexborough Cemetery.
