= Jack Palmer (boxer) =

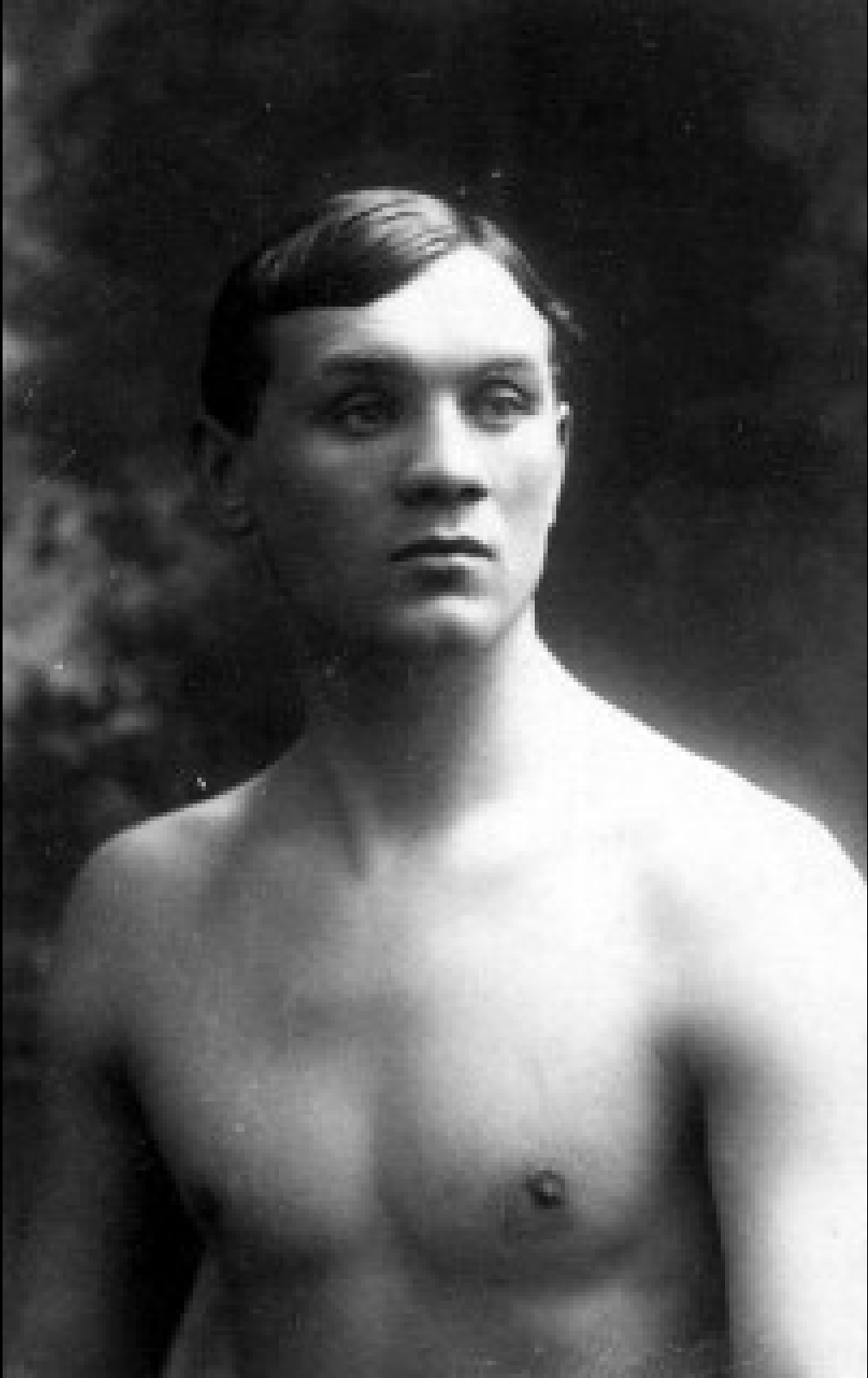

Personal information
- Nationality: British
- Born: John Liddell; 31 March 1879 Newcastle upon Tyne, England
- Died: 20 February 1928 (aged 48) Newcastle upon Tyne, England
- Height: 5 ft 10 in (178 cm)
- Weight: Heavyweight

Boxing career
- Stance: Orthodox

Boxing record
- Total fights: 42
- Wins: 23
- Win by KO: 16
- Losses: 11
- Draws: 3
- No contests: 6

John Liddell (31 March 1879 – 20 February 1928), better known as Jack Palmer, was an English heavyweight boxer. He was British champion from 1905 to 1906 and challenged Tommy Burns for the world title.

== Career ==
Born in Newcastle upon Tyne, Palmer was a miner before taking up boxing professionally. His first recorded professional fight took place in 1896, a win over George Bell. He challenged Jack Scales for the English title in 1901, losing by a 10th-round knockout. In April 1902 he beat Joe White to take the English 158 lbs middleweight title. He successfully defended the title against Dave Peters, and Tom Smith, and beat Ben Taylor in May 1903 in an English heavyweight title fight. He fought Jack Twin Sullivan later that month in a bout billed as a 158 lbs world heavyweight title fight, drawing over 15 rounds. He travelled to South Africa in 1904, beating Jack Lalor to take the South African middleweight title and Mike Williams to take the South African heavyweight title. He returned to England in 1905, and beat Geoff Thorne by a first-round knockout to become the first holder of the National Sporting Club British heavyweight title, the forerunner of the BBBofC heavyweight title. He lost that title the following year to Gunner Moir. In February 1908 he fought Tommy Burns for the World Heavyweight title, losing to a fourth-round knockout. It was over a year before his next fight, a draw with Bartley Connolly, and a further seven years before his next and final fight, a defeat to Fank Ray.

Jack Palmer died in a Newcastle nursing home on 20 February 1928.
