= Bob Moha =

American boxer

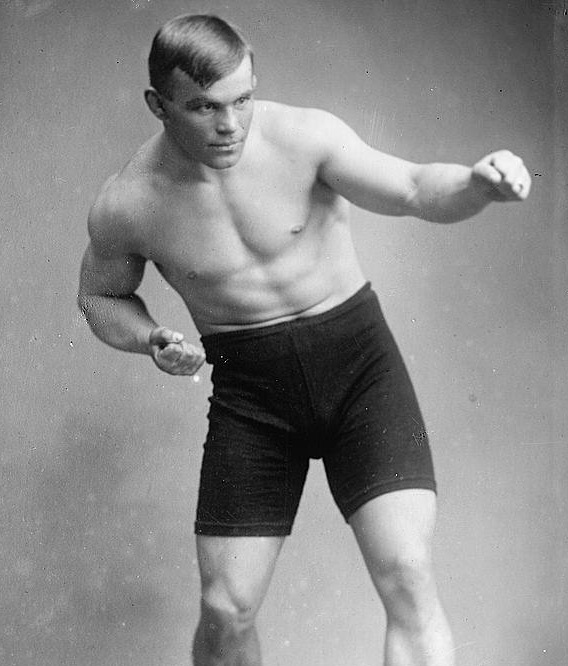
circa 1910-1915

Bob Moha (1890–1959) (birth name Robert Mucha) was a Milwaukee-based middleweight and light-heavyweight boxer, nicknamed the "Milwaukee Caveman". He was awarded the inaugural NYSAC light-heavyweight title in 1913, a belt he held for one year before losing it to world title claimaint Jack Dillon.

== Career ==
His decisive defeat of Billy Papke (then considered the lead contender for the middleweight title vacant in the wake of Stanley Ketchel's murder) at a bout in Boston on October 31, 1910, caused Papke to retire briefly from the ring.

On December 4, 1914, in a fight against Mike Gibbons of St. Paul, Minnesota held in Hudson, Wisconsin, Moha was disqualified in the second round for a blow below the belt. The sponsoring club denied him a share of the purse, since the fight did not go to a decision, and Moha sued them. The case eventually went to the Wisconsin Supreme Court, which, in a 1916 ruling, agreed with the original jury that he had failed to fulfill his contractual obligation. Moha was not permitted to introduce testimony that it was customary in such cases for the fouling fighter to receive his contractual share.

== Professional boxing record ==
All information in this section is derived from BoxRec, unless otherwise stated.

=== Official Record ===
| 80 fights | 14 wins | 9 losses |
|---|---|---|
| By knockout | 8 | 2 |
| By decision | 6 | 5 |
| By disqualification | 0 | 2 |
| Draws | 3 | |
| Newspaper decisions/draws | 54 | |

All newspaper decisions are officially regarded as “no decision” bouts and are not counted in the win/loss/draw column.

| No. | Result | Record | Opponent | Type | Round | Date | Age | Location | Notes |
|---|---|---|---|---|---|---|---|---|---|
| 80 | Loss | 14–9–3 (54) | Jeff Smith | NWS | 10 | Jun 19, 1922 | 32 years, 13 days | Empress Theater, Milwaukee, Wisconsin, U.S. | |
| 79 | Loss | 14–9–3 (53) | Jeff Smith | TKO | 7 (12) | May 3, 1922 | 31 years, 331 days | Oak Hill Auditorium, Youngstown, Ohio, U.S. | |
| 78 | Draw | 14–8–3 (53) | Bud Gorman | NWS | 10 | Apr 21, 1922 | 31 years, 319 days | Kenosha, Wisconsin, U.S. | |
| 77 | Win | 14–8–3 (52) | Ted Jamieson | NWS | 10 | Feb 20, 1922 | 31 years, 259 days | Empress Theater, Milwaukee, Wisconsin, U.S. | |
| 76 | Draw | 14–8–3 (51) | Ted Jamieson | NWS | 10 | Nov 7, 1921 | 31 years, 154 days | Auditorium, Milwaukee, Wisconsin, U.S. | |
| 75 | Loss | 14–8–3 (50) | Johnny Klesch | PTS | 12 | Mar 28, 1921 | 30 years, 295 days | Columbus, Ohio, U.S. | |
| 74 | Loss | 14–7–3 (50) | Bud Gorman | NWS | 12 | Mar 8, 1921 | 30 years, 275 days | Kenosha, Wisconsin, U.S. | |
| 73 | Win | 14–7–3 (49) | Eddie Rinderle | NWS | 12 | Feb 28, 1921 | 30 years, 267 days | Madison, Wisconsin, U.S. | |
| 72 | Loss | 14–7–3 (48) | Harry Greb | NWS | 12 | Nov 22, 1920 | 30 years, 169 days | Auditorium, Milwaukee, Wisconsin, U.S. | |
| 71 | Win | 14–7–3 (47) | Jack Herrick | NWS | 12 | Sep 14, 1920 | 30 years, 100 days | Empress Theater, Milwaukee, Wisconsin, U.S. | |
| 70 | Loss | 14–7–3 (46) | Harry Greb | NWS | 12 | Aug 14, 1920 | 30 years, 69 days | Cedar Point Arena, Sandusky, Ohio, U.S. | |
| 69 | Loss | 14–7–3 (45) | Harry Greb | NWS | 12 | Jul 5, 1920 | 30 years, 29 days | Canton Auditorium, Canton, Ohio, U.S. | |
| 68 | Loss | 14–7–3 (44) | Chuck Wiggins | NWS | 10 | Jun 7, 1920 | 30 years, 1 day | Vine Street Arena, Cincinnati, Ohio, U.S. | |
| 67 | Loss | 14–7–3 (43) | Happy Littleton | PTS | 15 | Apr 30, 1920 | 29 years, 329 days | Tulane Arena, New Orleans, Louisiana, U.S. | |
| 66 | Win | 14–6–3 (43) | Paul Samson-Körner | NWS | 10 | Apr 5, 1920 | 29 years, 304 days | Empress Theater, Milwaukee, Wisconsin, U.S. | |
| 65 | Draw | 14–6–3 (42) | Ted Jamieson | NWS | 10 | Jan 12, 1920 | 29 years, 220 days | Empress Theater, Milwaukee, Wisconsin, U.S. | |
| 64 | Win | 14–6–3 (41) | Steve Choynski | NWS | 10 | Nov 21, 1919 | 29 years, 168 days | Detroit, Michigan, U.S. | |
| 63 | Win | 14–6–3 (40) | Tommy Murphy | KO | 3 (10) | Aug 22, 1919 | 29 years, 77 days | Empress Theater, Milwaukee, Wisconsin, U.S. | |
| 62 | Loss | 13–6–3 (40) | Chuck Wiggins | NWS | 10 | Jun 18, 1919 | 29 years, 12 days | Hague Park, Jackson, Michigan, U.S. | |
| 61 | Loss | 13–6–3 (39) | George K.O. Brown | NWS | 10 | May 2, 1919 | 28 years, 330 days | John Wagner's Arena, Racine, Wisconsin, U.S. | |
| 60 | Loss | 13–6–3 (38) | Harry Greb | NWS | 10 | Jul 4, 1918 | 28 years, 28 days | Douglas Park, Rock Island, Illinois, U.S. | |
| 59 | Win | 13–6–3 (37) | Gus Christie | NWS | 10 | Jun 13, 1918 | 28 years, 7 days | Auditorium, Milwaukee, Wisconsin, U.S. | |
| 58 | Win | 13–6–3 (36) | Phil Harrison | NWS | 10 | May 20, 1918 | 27 years, 348 days | Racine, Wisconsin, U.S. | |
| 57 | Loss | 13–6–3 (35) | Harry Greb | PTS | 10 | Feb 18, 1918 | 27 years, 257 days | People's Theater, Cincinnati, Ohio, U.S. | |
| 56 | Loss | 13–5–3 (35) | George Chip | TKO | 4 (12) | Mar 12, 1917 | 26 years, 279 days | Youngstown, Ohio, U.S. | |
| 55 | Loss | 13–4–3 (35) | Tommy Gibbons | NWS | 10 | Feb 6, 1917 | 26 years, 245 days | Elite Rink, Milwaukee, Wisconsin, U.S. | |
| 54 | Win | 13–4–3 (34) | George K.O. Brown | NWS | 10 | Jan 22, 1917 | 26 years, 230 days | Racine, Wisconsin, U.S. | |
| 53 | Loss | 13–4–3 (33) | Battling Levinsky | NWS | 12 | Jan 17, 1917 | 26 years, 225 days | Grand Opera House, Youngstown, Ohio, U.S. | |
| 52 | Loss | 13–4–3 (32) | Jack Dillon | PTS | 15 | Jan 1, 1917 | 26 years, 209 days | Miami Club, Dayton, Ohio, U.S. | |
| 51 | Loss | 13–3–3 (32) | Harry Greb | NWS | 10 | Dec 26, 1915 | 25 years, 203 days | Broadway Auditorium, Buffalo, New York, U.S. | |
| 50 | Loss | 13–3–3 (31) | George K.O. Brown | NWS | 10 | Dec 5, 1915 | 25 years, 182 days | Broadway Arena, New York City, New York, U.S. | |
| 49 | Win | 13–3–3 (30) | Bartley Madden | NWS | 10 | Nov 30, 1915 | 25 years, 177 days | Pioneer Sporting Club, New York City, New York, U.S. | |
| 48 | Loss | 13–3–3 (29) | Billy Miske | NWS | 10 | Nov 17, 1915 | 25 years, 164 days | Broadway Arena, New York City, New York, U.S. | |
| 47 | Win | 13–3–3 (28) | Joe Cox | NWS | 10 | Aug 28, 1915 | 25 years, 83 days | Manhattan A.C., New York City, New York, U.S. | |
| 46 | Win | 13–3–3 (27) | Tony Caponi | KO | 5 (?) | Apr 27, 1915 | 24 years, 325 days | Beloit, Wisconsin, U.S. | |
| 45 | Win | 12–3–3 (27) | Dick Gilbert | NWS | 10 | Mar 22, 1915 | 24 years, 289 days | Hot Springs, Arkansas, U.S. | |
| 44 | Win | 12–3–3 (26) | Gus Christie | NWS | 10 | Feb 8, 1915 | 24 years, 247 days | Elite Rink, Milwaukee, Wisconsin, U.S. | |
| 43 | Loss | 12–3–3 (25) | Mike Gibbons | DQ | 2 (10) | Dec 4, 1914 | 24 years, 181 days | Arena, Hudson, Wisconsin, U.S. | |
| 42 | Loss | 12–2–3 (25) | Jack Dillon | PTS | 12 | Jun 15, 1914 | 24 years, 9 days | Holland Arena, Butte, Montana, U.S. | Lost NYSAC light heavyweight title; For Dillon's world light heavyweight title claim |
| 41 | Draw | 12–1–3 (25) | Al Norton | NWS | 10 | May 15, 1914 | 23 years, 343 days | 15th Street Garage, Kansas City, Missouri, U.S. | |
| 40 | Win | 12–1–3 (24) | Frank Mantell | NWS | 10 | May 11, 1914 | 23 years, 339 days | Hippodrome, Milwaukee, Wisconsin, U.S. | |
| 39 | Win | 12–1–3 (23) | Battling Levinsky | NWS | 10 | Mar 23, 1914 | 23 years, 290 days | Southside A.A., Milwaukee, Wisconsin, U.S. | |
| 38 | Win | 12–1–3 (22) | Jack Driscoll | NWS | 10 | Feb 10, 1914 | 23 years, 249 days | Broadway A.C., New York City, New York, U.S. | |
| 37 | Win | 12–1–3 (21) | Jack Fitzgerald | PTS | 15 | Jan 7, 1914 | 23 years, 215 days | Providence, Rhode Island, U.S. | Retained NYSAC light heavyweight title |
| 36 | Win | 11–1–3 (21) | Freddie Hicks | KO | 5 (10) | Jan 1, 1914 | 23 years, 209 days | Irving A.C., New York City, New York, U.S. | Retained NYSAC light heavyweight title |
| 35 | Draw | 10–1–3 (21) | Johnny Howard | NWS | 10 | Dec 20, 1913 | 23 years, 197 days | Irving A.C., New York City, New York, U.S. | |
| 34 | Win | 10–1–3 (20) | Tom McMahon | NWS | 6 | Nov 29, 1913 | 23 years, 176 days | Old City Hall, Pittsburgh, Pennsylvania, U.S. | |
| 33 | Loss | 10–1–3 (19) | Jack Dillon | NWS | 10 | Apr 28, 1913 | 22 years, 326 days | Southside A.C., Milwaukee, Wisconsin, U.S. | |
| 32 | Draw | 10–1–3 (18) | Eddie McGoorty | NWS | 10 | Mar 24, 1913 | 22 years, 291 days | Southside A.C., Milwaukee, Wisconsin, U.S. | |
| 31 | Win | 10–1–3 (17) | Cyclone Johnny Thompson | NWS | 10 | Feb 17, 1913 | 22 years, 267 days | Southside A.A., Milwaukee, Wisconsin, U.S. | Inaugural NYSAC light heavyweight title claim at stake; (via KO only) |
| 30 | Loss | 10–1–3 (16) | Eddie McGoorty | NWS | 10 | May 28, 1912 | 21 years, 357 days | St. Nicholas Arena, New York City, New York, U.S. | |
| 29 | Win | 10–1–3 (15) | Charley Hitte | NWS | 10 | May 6, 1912 | 21 years, 335 days | Knickerbocker A.C., Albany, New York, U.S. | |
| 28 | Win | 10–1–3 (14) | Bill MacKinnon | NWS | 10 | Apr 30, 1912 | 21 years, 329 days | St. Nicholas Arena, New York City, New York, U.S. | |
| 27 | Loss | 10–1–3 (13) | Leo Florian Hauck | NWS | 6 | Apr 20, 1912 | 21 years, 319 days | National A.C., Philadelphia, Pennsylvania, U.S. | |
| 26 | Draw | 10–1–3 (12) | Harry Ramsey | NWS | 6 | Apr 13, 1912 | 21 years, 312 days | National A.C., Philadelphia, Pennsylvania, U.S. | |
| 25 | Win | 10–1–3 (11) | Freddie Hicks | NWS | 10 | Apr 9, 1912 | 21 years, 308 days | Madison A.C., New York City, New York, U.S. | |
| 24 | Win | 10–1–3 (10) | Jim Smith | TKO | 8 (10) | Apr 3, 1912 | 21 years, 302 days | National S.C., New York City, New York, U.S. | |
| 23 | Win | 9–1–3 (10) | Sailor Burke | NWS | 10 | Mar 21, 1912 | 21 years, 289 days | National S.C., New York City, New York, U.S. | |
| 22 | Win | 9–1–3 (9) | Billy Papke | PTS | 12 | Oct 31, 1911 | 21 years, 147 days | Arena (Armory A.A.), Boston, Massachusetts, U.S. | |
| 21 | Win | 8–1–3 (9) | Billy Berger | PTS | 12 | Sep 5, 1911 | 21 years, 91 days | Armory, Boston, Massachusetts, U.S. | |
| 20 | Draw | 7–1–3 (9) | Jack Dillon | NWS | 10 | Jul 3, 1911 | 21 years, 27 days | International A.C., Buffalo, New York, U.S. | |
| 19 | Win | 7–1–3 (8) | Terry Martin | TKO | 6 (10) | May 12, 1911 | 20 years, 340 days | Star Theater, Milwaukee, Wisconsin, U.S. | |
| 18 | Loss | 6–1–3 (8) | Jack Dillon | NWS | 10 | May 3, 1911 | 20 years, 331 days | Auditorium (Virginia Ave.), Indianapolis, Indiana, U.S. | |
| 17 | Win | 6–1–3 (7) | Mike "Twin" Sullivan | NWS | 10 | Mar 10, 1911 | 20 years, 277 days | Shubert Theater, Milwaukee, Wisconsin, U.S. | |
| 16 | Win | 6–1–3 (6) | Dixie Kid | NWS | 10 | Feb 10, 1911 | 20 years, 249 days | Miller's Hall, Buffalo, New York, U.S. | |
| 15 | Win | 6–1–3 (5) | Guy Buckles | NWS | 10 | Feb 8, 1911 | 20 years, 247 days | Shubert Theater, Milwaukee, Wisconsin, U.S. | |
| 14 | Win | 6–1–3 (4) | Tommy Quill | NWS | 10 | Dec 26, 1910 | 20 years, 203 days | Shubert Theater, Milwaukee, Wisconsin, U.S. | |
| 13 | Win | 6–1–3 (3) | Young Loughrey | NWS | 10 | Nov 3, 1910 | 20 years, 150 days | Shubert Theater, Milwaukee, Wisconsin, U.S. | |
| 12 | Win | 6–1–3 (2) | Hilliard Lang | KO | 1 (?) | Sep 26, 1910 | 20 years, 112 days | Miller's Hall, Buffalo, New York, U.S. | |
| 11 | Win | 5–1–3 (2) | Jimmy Clabby | NWS | 10 | Jun 2, 1910 | 19 years, 361 days | Milwaukee, Wisconsin, U.S. | |
| 10 | Win | 5–1–3 (1) | Jerry Gaines | KO | 2 (?) | May 13, 1910 | 19 years, 341 days | Milwaukee A.C., Milwaukee, Wisconsin, U.S. | |
| 9 | Win | 4–1–3 (1) | Harry Mansfield | NWS | 10 | Dec 21, 1909 | 19 years, 198 days | Badger A.C., Milwaukee, Wisconsin, U.S. | |
| 8 | Draw | 4–1–3 | Jack Robinson | PTS | 8 | Oct 4, 1909 | 19 years, 120 days | Phoenix A.C., Memphis, Tennessee, U.S. | |
| 7 | Win | 4–1–2 | Jack Dougherty | PTS | 8 | Sep 24, 1908 | 18 years, 110 days | Badger A.C., Milwaukee, Wisconsin, U.S. | |
| 6 | Win | 3–1–2 | Joe Gregg | PTS | 8 | May 6, 1908 | 17 years, 335 days | Green Valley A.C., Milwaukee, Wisconsin, U.S. | |
| 5 | Draw | 2–1–2 | Joe Gregg | PTS | 8 | Jan 31, 1908 | 17 years, 239 days | Schlitz Park, Milwaukee, Wisconsin, U.S. | |
| 4 | Draw | 2–1–1 | Mickey Riley | PTS | 3 | Jan 25, 1908 | 17 years, 233 days | Gayety Theater, Milwaukee, Wisconsin, U.S. | |
| 3 | Win | 2–1 | Jack Purtell | PTS | 6 | Oct 15, 1907 | 17 years, 131 days | Green Valley A.C., Milwaukee, Wisconsin, U.S. | |
| 2 | Loss | 1–1 | Mickey Riley | DQ | 4 (6) | Dec 21, 1906 | 16 years, 198 days | Schlitz Park, Milwaukee, Wisconsin, U.S. | Moha disqualified for hitting Riley after a knockdown |
| 1 | Win | 1–0 | Henry Beckwith | KO | 6 (6) | Nov 2, 1906 | 16 years, 149 days | Badger A.C., Milwaukee, Wisconsin, U.S. | |

=== Unofficial record ===
| 80 fights | 42 wins | 27 losses |
|---|---|---|
| By knockout | 8 | 2 |
| By decision | 34 | 23 |
| By disqualification | 0 | 2 |
| Draws | 11 | |

Record with the inclusion of newspaper decisions in the win/loss/draw column.

| No. | Result | Record | Opponent | Type | Round(s) | Date | Age | Location | Notes |
|---|---|---|---|---|---|---|---|---|---|
| 80 | Loss | 43–26–11 | Jeff Smith | NWS | 10 | Jun 19, 1922 | 32 years, 13 days | Empress Theater, Milwaukee, Wisconsin, U.S. | |
| 79 | Loss | 43–25–11 | Jeff Smith | TKO | 7 (12) | May 3, 1922 | 31 years, 331 days | Oak Hill Auditorium, Youngstown, Ohio, U.S. | |
| 78 | Draw | 42–25–11 | Bud Gorman | NWS | 10 | Apr 21, 1922 | 31 years, 319 days | Kenosha, Wisconsin, U.S. | |
| 77 | Win | 42–25–10 | Ted Jamieson | NWS | 10 | Feb 20, 1922 | 31 years, 259 days | Empress Theater, Milwaukee, Wisconsin, U.S. | |
| 76 | Draw | 41–25–10 | Ted Jamieson | NWS | 10 | Nov 7, 1921 | 31 years, 154 days | Auditorium, Milwaukee, Wisconsin, U.S. | |
| 75 | Loss | 41–25–9 | Johnny Klesch | PTS | 12 | Mar 28, 1921 | 30 years, 295 days | Columbus, Ohio, U.S. | |
| 74 | Loss | 41–24–9 | Bud Gorman | NWS | 12 | Mar 8, 1921 | 30 years, 275 days | Kenosha, Wisconsin, U.S. | |
| 73 | Win | 41–23–9 | Eddie Rinderle | NWS | 12 | Feb 28, 1921 | 30 years, 267 days | Madison, Wisconsin, U.S. | |
| 72 | Loss | 40–23–9 | Harry Greb | NWS | 12 | Nov 22, 1920 | 30 years, 169 days | Auditorium, Milwaukee, Wisconsin, U.S. | |
| 71 | Win | 40–22–9 | Jack Herrick | NWS | 12 | Sep 14, 1920 | 30 years, 100 days | Empress Theater, Milwaukee, Wisconsin, U.S. | |
| 70 | Loss | 39–22–9 | Harry Greb | NWS | 12 | Aug 14, 1920 | 30 years, 69 days | Cedar Point Arena, Sandusky, Ohio, U.S. | |
| 69 | Loss | 39–21–9 | Harry Greb | NWS | 12 | Jul 5, 1920 | 30 years, 29 days | Canton Auditorium, Canton, Ohio, U.S. | |
| 68 | Loss | 39–20–9 | Chuck Wiggins | NWS | 10 | Jun 7, 1920 | 30 years, 1 day | Vine Street Arena, Cincinnati, Ohio, U.S. | |
| 67 | Loss | 39–19–9 | Happy Littleton | PTS | 15 | Apr 30, 1920 | 29 years, 329 days | Tulane Arena, New Orleans, Louisiana, U.S. | |
| 66 | Win | 39–18–9 | Paul Samson-Körner | NWS | 10 | Apr 5, 1920 | 29 years, 304 days | Empress Theater, Milwaukee, Wisconsin, U.S. | |
| 65 | Draw | 38–18–9 | Ted Jamieson | NWS | 10 | Jan 12, 1920 | 29 years, 220 days | Empress Theater, Milwaukee, Wisconsin, U.S. | |
| 64 | Win | 38–18–8 | Steve Choynski | NWS | 10 | Nov 21, 1919 | 29 years, 168 days | Detroit, Michigan, U.S. | |
| 63 | Win | 37–18–8 | Tommy Murphy | KO | 3 (10) | Aug 22, 1919 | 29 years, 77 days | Empress Theater, Milwaukee, Wisconsin, U.S. | |
| 62 | Loss | 36–18–8 | Chuck Wiggins | NWS | 10 | Jun 18, 1919 | 29 years, 12 days | Hague Park, Jackson, Michigan, U.S. | |
| 61 | Loss | 36–17–8 | George K.O. Brown | NWS | 10 | May 2, 1919 | 28 years, 330 days | John Wagner's Arena, Racine, Wisconsin, U.S. | |
| 60 | Loss | 36–16–8 | Harry Greb | NWS | 10 | Jul 4, 1918 | 28 years, 28 days | Douglas Park, Rock Island, Illinois, U.S. | |
| 59 | Win | 36–15–8 | Gus Christie | NWS | 10 | Jun 13, 1918 | 28 years, 7 days | Auditorium, Milwaukee, Wisconsin, U.S. | |
| 58 | Win | 35–15–8 | Phil Harrison | NWS | 10 | May 20, 1918 | 27 years, 348 days | Racine, Wisconsin, U.S. | |
| 57 | Loss | 34–15–8 | Harry Greb | PTS | 10 | Feb 18, 1918 | 27 years, 257 days | People's Theater, Cincinnati, Ohio, U.S. | |
| 56 | Loss | 34–14–8 | George Chip | TKO | 4 (12) | Mar 12, 1917 | 26 years, 279 days | Youngstown, Ohio, U.S. | |
| 55 | Loss | 34–13–8 | Tommy Gibbons | NWS | 10 | Feb 6, 1917 | 26 years, 245 days | Elite Rink, Milwaukee, Wisconsin, U.S. | |
| 54 | Win | 34–12–8 | George K.O. Brown | NWS | 10 | Jan 22, 1917 | 26 years, 230 days | Racine, Wisconsin, U.S. | |
| 53 | Loss | 33–12–8 | Battling Levinsky | NWS | 12 | Jan 17, 1917 | 26 years, 225 days | Grand Opera House, Youngstown, Ohio, U.S. | |
| 52 | Loss | 33–11–8 | Jack Dillon | PTS | 15 | Jan 1, 1917 | 26 years, 209 days | Miami Club, Dayton, Ohio, U.S. | |
| 51 | Loss | 33–10–8 | Harry Greb | NWS | 10 | Dec 26, 1915 | 25 years, 203 days | Broadway Auditorium, Buffalo, New York, U.S. | |
| 50 | Loss | 33–9–8 | George K.O. Brown | NWS | 10 | Dec 5, 1915 | 25 years, 182 days | Broadway Arena, New York City, New York, U.S. | |
| 49 | Win | 33–8–8 | Bartley Madden | NWS | 10 | Nov 30, 1915 | 25 years, 177 days | Pioneer Sporting Club, New York City, New York, U.S. | |
| 48 | Loss | 32–8–8 | Billy Miske | NWS | 10 | Nov 17, 1915 | 25 years, 164 days | Broadway Arena, New York City, New York, U.S. | |
| 47 | Win | 32–7–8 | Joe Cox | NWS | 10 | Aug 28, 1915 | 25 years, 83 days | Manhattan A.C., New York City, New York, U.S. | |
| 46 | Win | 31–7–8 | Tony Caponi | KO | 5 (?) | Apr 27, 1915 | 24 years, 325 days | Beloit, Wisconsin, U.S. | |
| 45 | Win | 30–7–8 | Dick Gilbert | NWS | 10 | Mar 22, 1915 | 24 years, 289 days | Hot Springs, Arkansas, U.S. | |
| 44 | Win | 29–7–8 | Gus Christie | NWS | 10 | Feb 8, 1915 | 24 years, 247 days | Elite Rink, Milwaukee, Wisconsin, U.S. | |
| 43 | Loss | 28–7–8 | Mike Gibbons | DQ | 2 (10) | Dec 4, 1914 | 24 years, 181 days | Arena, Hudson, Wisconsin, U.S. | |
| 42 | Loss | 28–6–8 | Jack Dillon | PTS | 12 | Jun 15, 1914 | 24 years, 9 days | Holland Arena, Butte, Montana, U.S. | Lost NYSAC light-heavyweight title; For Dillon's world light-heavyweight title claim |
| 41 | Draw | 28–5–8 | Al Norton | NWS | 10 | May 15, 1914 | 23 years, 343 days | 15th Street Garage, Kansas City, Missouri, U.S. | |
| 40 | Win | 28–5–7 | Frank Mantell | NWS | 10 | May 11, 1914 | 23 years, 339 days | Hippodrome, Milwaukee, Wisconsin, U.S. | |
| 39 | Win | 27–5–7 | Battling Levinsky | NWS | 10 | Mar 23, 1914 | 23 years, 290 days | Southside A.A., Milwaukee, Wisconsin, U.S. | |
| 38 | Win | 26–5–7 | Jack Driscoll | NWS | 10 | Feb 10, 1914 | 23 years, 249 days | Broadway A.C., New York City, New York, U.S. | |
| 37 | Win | 25–5–7 | Jack Fitzgerald | PTS | 15 | Jan 7, 1914 | 23 years, 215 days | Providence, Rhode Island, U.S. | Retained NYSAC light-heavyweight title |
| 36 | Win | 24–5–7 | Freddie Hicks | KO | 5 (10) | Jan 1, 1914 | 23 years, 209 days | Irving A.C., New York City, New York, U.S. | Retained NYSAC light-heavyweight title |
| 35 | Draw | 23–5–7 | Johnny Howard | NWS | 10 | Dec 20, 1913 | 23 years, 197 days | Irving A.C., New York City, New York, U.S. | |
| 34 | Win | 23–5–6 | Tom McMahon | NWS | 6 | Nov 29, 1913 | 23 years, 176 days | Old City Hall, Pittsburgh, Pennsylvania, U.S. | |
| 33 | Loss | 22–5–6 | Jack Dillon | NWS | 10 | Apr 28, 1913 | 22 years, 326 days | Southside A.C., Milwaukee, Wisconsin, U.S. | |
| 32 | Draw | 22–4–6 | Eddie McGoorty | NWS | 10 | Mar 24, 1913 | 22 years, 291 days | Southside A.C., Milwaukee, Wisconsin, U.S. | |
| 31 | Win | 22–4–5 | Cyclone Johnny Thompson | NWS | 10 | Feb 17, 1913 | 22 years, 267 days | Southside A.A., Milwaukee, Wisconsin, U.S. | Inaugural NYSAC light-heavyweight title claim at stake; (via KO only) |
| 30 | Loss | 21–4–5 | Eddie McGoorty | NWS | 10 | May 28, 1912 | 21 years, 357 days | St. Nicholas Arena, New York City, New York, U.S. | |
| 29 | Win | 21–3–5 | Charley Hitte | NWS | 10 | May 6, 1912 | 21 years, 335 days | Knickerbocker A.C., Albany, New York, U.S. | |
| 28 | Win | 20–3–5 | Bill MacKinnon | NWS | 10 | Apr 30, 1912 | 21 years, 329 days | St. Nicholas Arena, New York City, New York, U.S. | |
| 27 | Loss | 19–3–5 | Leo Florian Hauck | NWS | 6 | Apr 20, 1912 | 21 years, 319 days | National A.C., Philadelphia, Pennsylvania, U.S. | |
| 26 | Draw | 19–2–5 | Harry Ramsey | NWS | 6 | Apr 13, 1912 | 21 years, 312 days | National A.C., Philadelphia, Pennsylvania, U.S. | |
| 25 | Win | 19–2–4 | Freddie Hicks | NWS | 10 | Apr 9, 1912 | 21 years, 308 days | Madison A.C., New York City, New York, U.S. | |
| 24 | Win | 18–2–4 | Jim Smith | TKO | 8 (10) | Apr 3, 1912 | 21 years, 302 days | National S.C., New York City, New York, U.S. | |
| 23 | Win | 17–2–4 | Sailor Burke | NWS | 10 | Mar 21, 1912 | 21 years, 289 days | National S.C., New York City, New York, U.S. | |
| 22 | Win | 16–2–4 | Billy Papke | PTS | 12 | Oct 31, 1911 | 21 years, 147 days | Arena (Armory A.A.), Boston, Massachusetts, U.S. | |
| 21 | Win | 15–2–4 | Billy Berger | PTS | 12 | Sep 5, 1911 | 21 years, 91 days | Armory, Boston, Massachusetts, U.S. | |
| 20 | Draw | 14–2–4 | Jack Dillon | NWS | 10 | Jul 3, 1911 | 21 years, 27 days | International A.C., Buffalo, New York, U.S. | |
| 19 | Win | 14–2–3 | Terry Martin | TKO | 6 (10) | May 12, 1911 | 20 years, 340 days | Star Theater, Milwaukee, Wisconsin, U.S. | |
| 18 | Loss | 13–2–3 | Jack Dillon | NWS | 10 | May 3, 1911 | 20 years, 331 days | Auditorium (Virginia Ave.), Indianapolis, Indiana, U.S. | |
| 17 | Win | 13–1–3 | Mike "Twin" Sullivan | NWS | 10 | Mar 10, 1911 | 20 years, 277 days | Shubert Theater, Milwaukee, Wisconsin, U.S. | |
| 16 | Win | 12–1–3 | Dixie Kid | NWS | 10 | Feb 10, 1911 | 20 years, 249 days | Miller's Hall, Buffalo, New York, U.S. | |
| 15 | Win | 11–1–3 | Guy Buckles | NWS | 10 | Feb 8, 1911 | 20 years, 247 days | Shubert Theater, Milwaukee, Wisconsin, U.S. | |
| 14 | Win | 10–1–3 | Tommy Quill | NWS | 10 | Dec 26, 1910 | 20 years, 203 days | Shubert Theater, Milwaukee, Wisconsin, U.S. | |
| 13 | Win | 9–1–3 | Young Loughrey | NWS | 10 | Nov 3, 1910 | 20 years, 150 days | Shubert Theater, Milwaukee, Wisconsin, U.S. | |
| 12 | Win | 8–1–3 | Hilliard Lang | KO | 1 (?) | Sep 26, 1910 | 20 years, 112 days | Miller's Hall, Buffalo, New York, U.S. | |
| 11 | Win | 7–1–3 | Jimmy Clabby | NWS | 10 | Jun 2, 1910 | 19 years, 361 days | Milwaukee, Wisconsin, U.S. | |
| 10 | Win | 6–1–3 | Jerry Gaines | KO | 2 (?) | May 13, 1910 | 19 years, 341 days | Milwaukee A.C., Milwaukee, Wisconsin, U.S. | |
| 9 | Win | 5–1–3 | Harry Mansfield | NWS | 10 | Dec 21, 1909 | 19 years, 198 days | Badger A.C., Milwaukee, Wisconsin, U.S. | |
| 8 | Draw | 4–1–3 | Jack Robinson | PTS | 8 | Oct 4, 1909 | 19 years, 120 days | Phoenix A.C., Memphis, Tennessee, U.S. | |
| 7 | Win | 4–1–2 | Jack Dougherty | PTS | 8 | Sep 24, 1908 | 18 years, 110 days | Badger A.C., Milwaukee, Wisconsin, U.S. | |
| 6 | Win | 3–1–2 | Joe Gregg | PTS | 8 | May 6, 1908 | 17 years, 335 days | Green Valley A.C., Milwaukee, Wisconsin, U.S. | |
| 5 | Draw | 2–1–2 | Joe Gregg | PTS | 8 | Jan 31, 1908 | 17 years, 239 days | Schlitz Park, Milwaukee, Wisconsin, U.S. | |
| 4 | Draw | 2–1–1 | Mickey Riley | PTS | 3 | Jan 25, 1908 | 17 years, 233 days | Gayety Theater, Milwaukee, Wisconsin, U.S. | |
| 3 | Win | 2–1 | Jack Purtell | PTS | 6 | Oct 15, 1907 | 17 years, 131 days | Green Valley A.C., Milwaukee, Wisconsin, U.S. | |
| 2 | Loss | 1–1 | Mickey Riley | DQ | 4 (6) | Dec 21, 1906 | 16 years, 198 days | Schlitz Park, Milwaukee, Wisconsin, U.S. | Moha disqualified for hitting Riley after a knockdown |
| 1 | Win | 1–0 | Henry Beckwith | KO | 6 (6) | Nov 2, 1906 | 16 years, 149 days | Badger A.C., Milwaukee, Wisconsin, U.S. | |
