= Madison Square Garden (film) =

1932 film

- Directed by: Harry Joe Brown
- Screenplay by: Thomson Burtis; Allen Rivkin; P.J. Wolfson
- Produced by: Charles R. Rogers
- Starring: Jack Oakie; Thomas Meighan; Marian Nixon; William Collier, Sr. ZaSu Pitts; Lew Cody; William "Stage" Boyd
- Cinematography: Henry Sharp
- Music by: Harold Lewis
- Production company: Paramount Pictures
- Distributed by: Paramount Pictures
- Release date: November 4, 1932
- Running time: 74 minutes
- Country: United States
- Language: English

Madison Square Garden is a 1932 American Pre-Code drama film directed by Harry Joe Brown and written by Thomson Burtis, Allen Rivkin and P.J. Wolfson.

The film stars Jack Oakie, Thomas Meighan, Marian Nixon, William Collier, Sr., ZaSu Pitts, Lew Cody and William "Stage" Boyd. The film was released on November 4, 1932, by Paramount Pictures.

Actual boxers like Jack Johnson, Billy Papke and Tom Sharkey and actual sports journalists like Paul Gallico, Grantland Rice and Damon Runyon appear in the story as themselves.

== Plot ==
Middleweight contender Eddie Burke needs to change managers after his, Doc Williams, sets up a big fight at Madison Square Garden for him. Eddie becomes distracted by too much partying and girlfriend Bee, who is understandably worried about him.

Eddie falls into the hands of a crooked trainer, "Honest John" Miller, who works for a racketeer, Sloane. He is made to lose the fight, Miller wrapping his opponent's hands in plaster, and takes a terrible beating. But when the truth comes to light, some of Eddie's fellow boxers go after the crooks with their fists.

== Cast ==
- Jack Oakie as Eddie Burke
- Thomas Meighan as Bill Carley
- Marian Nixon as Bee
- William Collier, Sr. as Doc Williams
- ZaSu Pitts as Florrie
- Lew Cody as Rourke
- William "Stage" Boyd as Sloane
- Warren Hymer as Brassie Randall
- Robert Elliott as Honest John Miller
- Joyce Compton as Joyce
- Bert Gordon as Izzy
- Noel Francis as himself
- Sailor Sharkey as himself
- Tommy Ryan as himself
- Wrestler Stanislaus Zbyszko as himself
- Billy Papke as himself
- Mike Donlin (referee) as himself
- Tod Sloan as himself
- Damon Runyon as himself
- Grantland Rice as himself
- Jack Lait as himself
- Westbrook Pegler as himself
- Paul Gallico as himself
- Jack Johnson (boxer) as himself
- Ed W. Smith as himself
- Teddy Hayes as himself
- Lou Magnolia as himself
- W. C. Robinson as himself

== See also ==
- List of boxing films
