= Billy Papke =

American boxer (1886–1936)

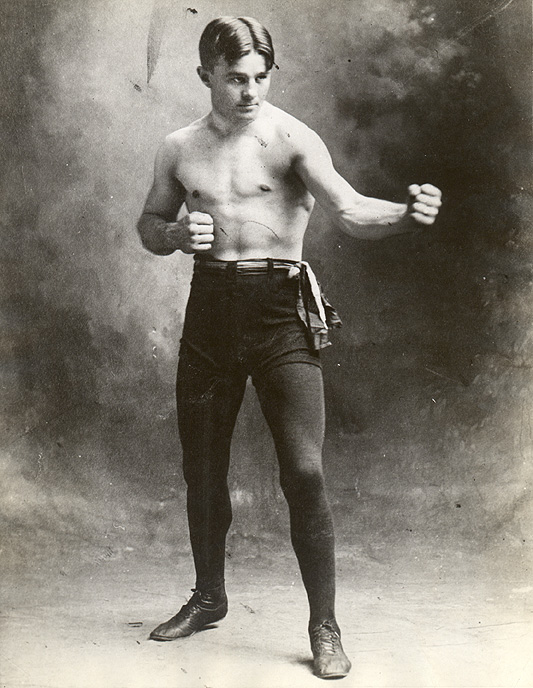
- Papke in 1910

Personal information
- Nickname: The Illinois Thunderbolt
- Born: William Herman Papke, Sr. September 17, 1886 Spring Valley, Illinois, US
- Died: November 26, 1936 (aged 50) Newport Beach, California, US
- Height: 5 ft 9 in (1.75 m)
- Weight: Middleweight

Boxing career
- Stance: Orthodox

Boxing record
- Total fights: 63
- Wins: 39
- Win by KO: 31
- Losses: 17
- Draws: 7

Billy Papke (born William Papke, and known as "The Illinois Thunderbolt") (September 17, 1886 – November 26, 1936) was an American boxer who held the World Middleweight Championship from September 7 to November 26, 1908. In 1910-12, he also took the Australian and British versions of the World Middleweight Championship, though American boxing historians generally take less note of these titles. With a solid and efficient punch, 70 percent of his better publicized career wins by decision were from knockouts, and roughly 40% of his reported fights were as well. Papke was inducted into the International Boxing Hall of Fame in 2001. Sportswriter Nat Fleischer, original owner of "Ring" Magazine, ranked Papke as the seventh best middleweight of all time. Announcer Charley Rose ranked him as the tenth greatest middleweight in boxing history. He was elected to the Ring Boxing Hall of Fame in 1972.

== Early life and career ==
Papke was born on September 17, 1886, in Spring Valley, Illinois. He began his boxing career in 1906, eventually winning 40 fights by decision and drawing six times. He worked as a miner during his years in Illinois and occasionally boxed with fellow miners. His earliest fights in 1906 took place near Spring Valley or Peoria where he had moved by 1907, though he traveled frequently North to box in the next few years.

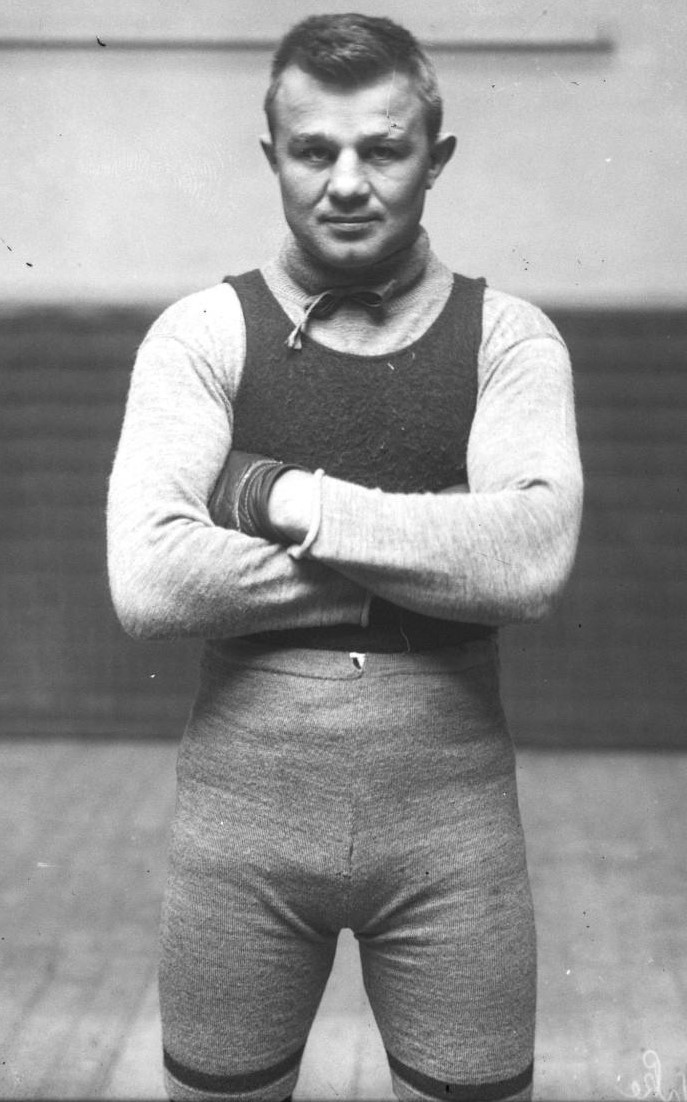
Portrait of Papke taken in France

In an important early bout on September 14, 1907, Papke knocked out Terry Martin in the third round at the National Athletic Club in Philadelphia. The win led several reporters to view Papke as a middleweight title contender.

On November 22, 1907, Papke defeated Bartley Connolly in a fourth round technical knockout. In a one sided bout, Papke floored his opponent once in the first and five times in the third. Connolly tried to clinch in the early rounds to avoid his aggressive and better skilled opponent. In his career, Connolly would defeat the great Joe Walcott, and box in Great Britain.

In a well publicized bout On November 14, 1907, Papke defeated Tony Caponi in their first bout in a second round knockout at the Peoria Club in Peoria, Illinois. After only two minutes and ten seconds of fighting in the second, Papke put Caponi down for the count with a strong right uppercut to the jaw immediately after breaking from a clinch. Caponi tried to rise, but went back down and stayed on the mat. The two had fought two draws the previous May and June, with Papke holding a slight lead during the more recent match. Adding to the interest in the contest was Caponi's unsuccessful attempt at Hugo Kelly's World and American 158 lb. middleweight championship the previous August.

=== American middleweight championship bout with Hugo Kelly, March, 1908 ===
On March 16, 1908, Papke defeated Hugo Kelly at the Hippodrome in Milwaukee in a ten round points decision that was billed as the world and American 158 pound middleweight championship, though it was not a universally sanctioned bout. There was a significant amount of clinching, and some butting in the match mostly attributed to Papke. Papke put Kelly on the mat in the first round with a blow to the jaw, but Kelly recovered quickly and fought well defensively. There was a shower of blows in the fourth, followed by more clinching in the fifth, as the boxers recovered from fatigue. The final four rounds were close, but the referee decided in favor of Papke at the bell in the tenth. Papke's management successfully used the win as a stepping stone to a world middleweight title match with Stanley Ketchel ten weeks later. On May 15, 1909, Papke would defeat Kelly more decisively in a first round knockout in Colma, California.

== Rivalry with middleweight champion Stanley Ketchel ==
Papke's first meeting with Stanley Ketchel resulted in loss by 10-round points decision, on June 4, 1908, in Milwaukee, Wisconsin. It was the first of Papke's four fights with the reigning Middleweight champion.

=== World middleweight championship win, September, 1908 ===
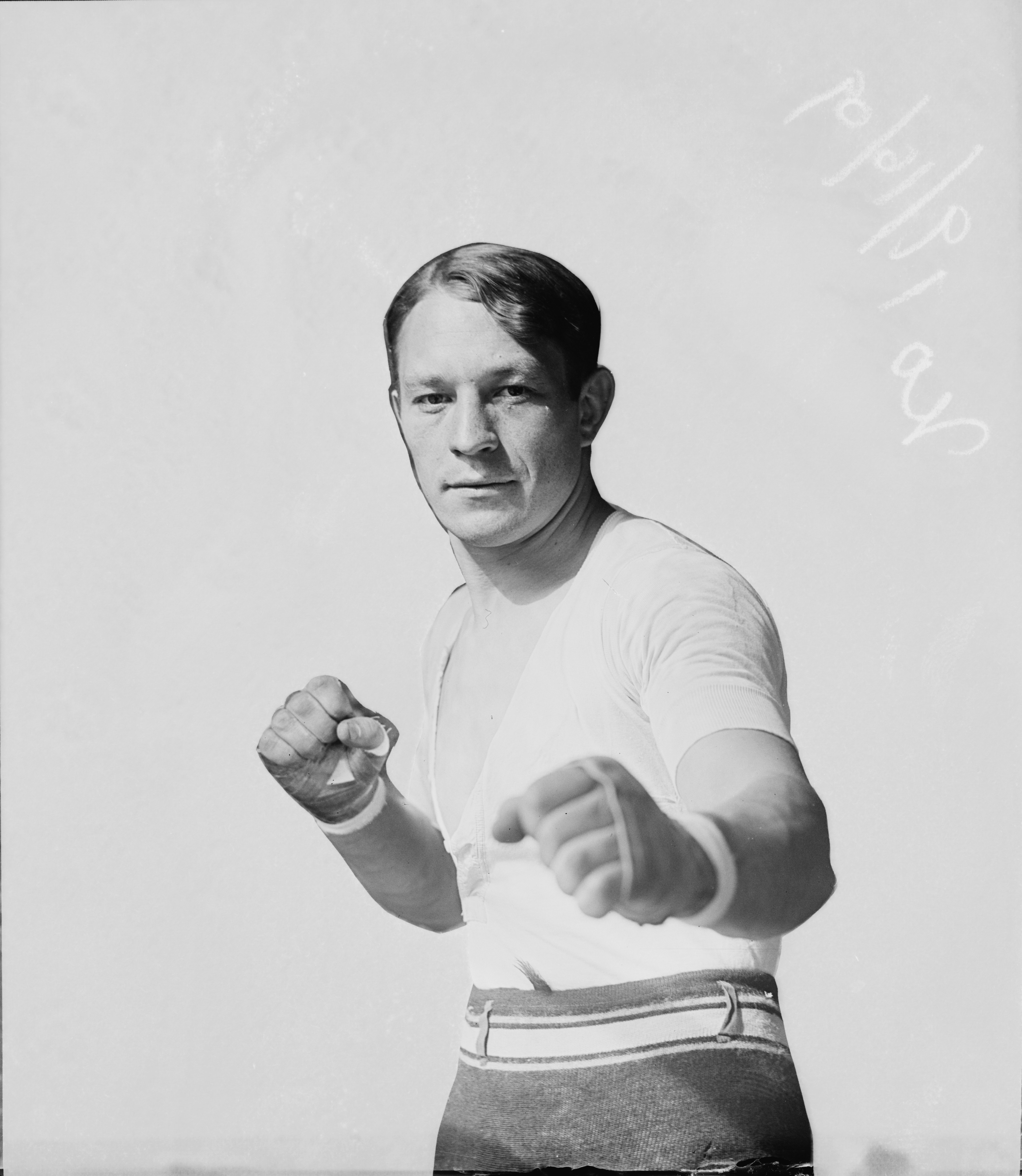
Ketchel in fighting pose

Papke won the second fight with Ketchel in an upset at Jeffrie's Arena in Vernon, near Los Angeles, on September 7, 1908, in a convincing twelve round technical knockout, and impressively took the world middleweight title from the reigning champion. The referee was the thirty-three year old boxing legend and former heavyweight champion James J. Jeffries.

According to legend, Papke helped his chances of winning the fight by punching Ketchel in the face or throat unexpectedly when Ketchel stepped forward with his right hand extended to shake at the beginning of the bout. This legend has been dis-proven by boxing historians, as neither the combatants, nor ringside newspaper reporters, corner men, or other eyewitnesses ever attested to or made record of the incident. A few newspapers including the Record Argus of Greenville, Pennsylvania, perpetuated the legend of the sucker punch at the handshake, though the myth may have had its origin in Papke's furious attack very early in the first round and the not infrequent habit of a few boxing reporters of the era to embellish their reporting. Even reporting on his death in 1936, a newspaper perpetuated the myth of Papke's first blow coming as Ketchel extended his hand to shake.

A California newspaper, likely using the account of a ringside reporter, inferred the fighting did not commence until after the opening bell, and that both men entered the ring in perfect condition, but that within one minute and twenty seconds, Papke had mounted an attack that determined the outcome of the bout. Ketchel was down three times in the first round, and Papke seemed to have the upper hand throughout the fierce and furious bout. The match became so one-sided in favor of Papke by the close, that the crowd yelled for referee Jeffries to stop the fight. Papke dealt the final blows in the twelfth delivering a right swing followed by a powerful hook.

=== Loss of world middleweight championship, November, 1908 ===
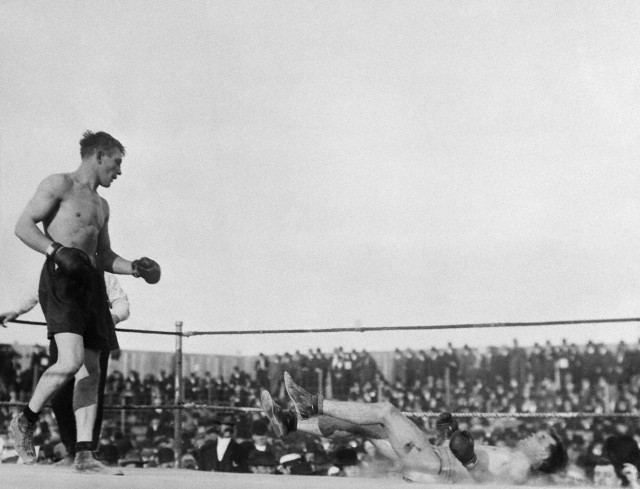
Ketchel standing over Papke in their third fight, Nov. 1908

In their third meeting, two months later on November 26, 1908, Papke lost his title to Ketchel in an eleventh round knockout in Colma, California, and received a terrific beating in the process. Papke's own wife did not recognize him after the bout was over. Ketchel led the bout through most of the first ten rounds. Papke went down in the eleventh for a count of nine, and not long after arising was struck by a left to the chin that ended the bout.

Papke lost the fourth and final meeting by unanimous decision before a large crowd in Colma, California, near San Francisco, on July 5, 1909. It was a particularly savage encounter and lasted 20 rounds. One source wrote that of all their fights it was "the bloodiest and most grueling". Ketchel was reported to have broken his right hand in the sixth, and Papke a bone in his left.

=== Impressive wins over welterweight contender Willie Lewis, 1909-10 ===
On October 8, 1909, and March 19, 1910, Papke impressively defeated American welterweight contender Willie Lewis in Pittsburgh in a six round newspaper decision, and in France's Cirque de Paris in a third round knockout. In their well attended Pittsburgh match, Lewis was down for a nine count as early as the second from a right to the jaw and continued receiving blows to the jaw in the third. Lewis came back only briefly in the fifth, and with a broken nose hung on barely til the closing bell in the sixth. In their heavily attended world welterweight championship bout in Paris, Papke demonstrated superior hitting ability, speed, and defense throughout the match, and was the aggressor through all three rounds. Papke tried to have his agent arrange a match with Ketchel after the bout, but it was never to be.

== Mid career ==
After Ketchel's murder at age 24, on October 15, 1910, while training at a Cattle Ranch in Conway, Missouri, Papke became one of several middleweights contesting the world middleweight title.

=== Four important bouts at Sydney Stadium ===
On February 11, 1911, Papke lost to Cyclone Johnny Thompson in Sydney, Australia in a twenty round points decision, with Thompson subsequently claiming Papke's world middleweight title. The bout was one of four well-attended bouts he fought for the Australian version of the Middleweight Championship at Sydney Stadium, which included a win against Ed Williams as well as a win by TKO and a loss by DQ to Dave Smith. In Papke's TKO victory against Smith, Smith led through six rounds, but went down three times before his seconds threw in the towel. Smith would later take the Australian Light Heavyweight and Heavyweight Championships, as well as compete for the Australian Middleweight Championship.

On August 22, 1911, Papke had a surprising loss to Sailor Burke, at St. Nicholas Arena in New York City in a newspaper decision of the New York Times. Papke was defending his World Middleweight title which he took at London's Palladium in a ninth round knockout from Jim Sullivan two months earlier on June 8, 1911. Burke battered Papke, but used little science in his approach. Attending the fight, and likely disappointed, was the Scottish reporter Percy Douglas, 10th Marquess of Queensberry, a member of the royal line and son of the 9th Marquess, who had endorsed the modern boxing rules published by Welshman John Graham Chambers in 1867. The title did not pass hands as both men were over the middleweight weight limit of 160, and weighing nearer 165.

After an October, 1911 loss in Boston to Bob Moha, he briefly retired, but he would soon return to the ring.

=== Loss to Frank Mantel, middleweight contender, February, 1912 ===
On February 22, 1912, Papke lost to American world middleweight contender Frank Mantell in Sacramento in a twenty round points decision. It was a slow bout with much vertical wrestling while the contestants weakly attempted to score blows during the clinches. After the bout, Mantell tried to claim Papke's former British world middleweight title of June 11, 1911, taken from Jim Sullivan in London. Mantell's claim was weak, however, as Papke claimed he did not make weight for the match.

=== Win over Marcel Moreau in Paris, June, 1912 ===
On June 29, 1912, Papke, defending his June, 1911 world middleweight title, defeated Marcel Moreau at France's Cirque de Paris in a sixteenth round technical knockout. Papke was down in the first, while Moreau was knocked down twice in the fifteenth by left and right hooks before failing to show for the final round.

Papke lost to middle and welterweight contender Leo Houck in the third week of September 1912 at the Olympia Athletic Club in Philadelphia in a six round newspaper decision. The first two rounds were slow, with Papke staging a comeback in the third which was marred by his tossing Houck around in the clinches and refusing to break at the referee's request. His clinching may have signaled his fatigue from the repeated blows of his opponent. In the final three rounds, Houck dominated, throwing several swift blows with no return in the fourth, and sending Papke through the ropes in the sixth.

=== Win over European middleweight champion Georges Carpentier, October 1912 ===
Papke traveled to Paris where he beat future champion Georges Carpentier in an eighteenth round technical knockout on October 23, 1912. It became a non-championship fight when Papke exceeded the middle-weight limit at the pre-fight weigh-in. Papke's infighting or close range techniques baffled the skilled Carpentier. At the end of the eighth, Carpentier's right eye was closed, and he fought more cautiously. Though staging a comeback in the fifteenth and sixteenth, Carpentier was floored in the opening of the seventeenth round, when Papke struck him with a left hook, likely taking advantage of the reduced vision on his opponent's right side. Carpentier attempted to fight on but gave up after consulting with his corner men, and did not return for the eighteenth round.

=== Final loss of the world middleweight championship to Frank Klaus, March 1913 ===
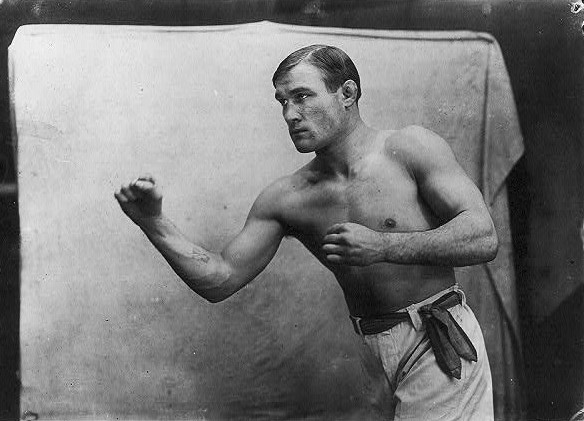
Frank Klaus c. 1910-15

Papke was beaten by an American, Pennsylvania middleweight Frank Klaus on March 5, 1913, at France's Cirque de Paris. The referee warned Papke and called fouls and breaks repeatedly in the late rounds for wrestling, head-butting, and low blows. In frustration, the referee called his last foul in the fifteenth round for a low blow which Papke had been called on in the previous two rounds, disqualifying Papke and ending both the match and Papke's title hopes.

After his October 14, 1913, loss to Marty Rowan in St. Louis, Papke took a three year hiatus from the ring, before returning in 1916, and facing his last few opponents.

He continued fighting until 1919, losing a four rounder to the prolific boxer and contender Soldier Bartfield in San Francisco in April 1919.

== Boxing retirement, death and legacy ==
On November 22, 1932, Papke came out of his 1919 boxing retirement to stage a three round exhibition with heavyweight "Fireman" Jim Flynn, the only boxer who ever knocked out Jack Dempsey. He had lost to Flynn earlier in a newspaper decision in March 1909 in Pasadena.

=== Appearances in boxing movies ===
In his retirement near Los Angeles, he benefited from his real estate investments. He appeared in at least three boxing-themed movies; The Prince of Broadway (1926) which featured boxers Leach Cross, Frankie Genaro, and Ad Wolgast, Madison Square Garden (1932), where he appeared as himself as did other boxers and sports writers, and The Prizefighter and the Lady (1933), which starred heavyweight champion Max Baer (boxer).

=== Death ===
Near the time of his death, he was working as a "host" at Jim Flynn's Cafe in Los Angeles, a beer hall named after the heavyweight boxer. He had recently refereed a boxing match.

Papke died on November 27, 1936, by suicide, after first killing his ex-wife. The violent incident may have been a result of undiagnosed brain dementia suffered from years of trauma in the ring. It occurred at his ex-wife Edna's residence on Balboa Island, part of Newport Beach, south of Los Angeles in Southern California. Papke was disappointed about his recent divorce and was hoping for a reconciliation. Both he and his former wife were buried at Mt. View Cemetery in Altadena, California, slightly North of Pasadena and Los Angeles. He left three sons with whom he lived, Robert, Clifford, and William A. Papke Jr.

He is a primary character in the novel, The Killings of Stanley Ketchel, (2005), by James Carlos Blake.

== Professional boxing record ==
All information in this section is derived from BoxRec, unless otherwise stated.

=== Official record ===
63 fights	37 wins	11 losses
By knockout	31	1
By decision	5	8
By disqualification	1	2
Draws	6	
Newspaper decisions/draws	9	

All newspaper decisions are officially regarded as “no decision” bouts and are not counted to the win/loss/draw column.

No.	Result	Record	Opponent	Type	Round	Date	Location	Notes
63	Loss	37–11–6 (9)	Jimmy Darcy	PTS	4	May 14, 1919	Dreamland Arena, San Diego, California, U.S.	
62	Loss	37–10–6 (9)	Jakob "Soldier" Bartfield	PTS	4	Apr 8, 1919	Coliseum, San Francisco, California, U.S.	
61	Loss	37–9–6 (9)	Jack Smith	NWS	10	Jun 1, 1916	Clermont Avenue Rink, Brooklyn, New York City, New York, U.S.	
60	Loss	37–9–6 (8)	Marty Rowan	PTS	8	Oct 14, 1913	Future City A.C., Saint Louis, Missouri, U.S.	
59	Loss	37–8–6 (8)	Frank Klaus	RTD	6 (20)	Mar 5, 1913	Cirque de Paris, Paris, France	Lost world middleweight title claim; For Klaus' world middleweight title claim
58	Win	37–7–6 (8)	Georges Bernard	RTD	6 (20)	Dec 4, 1912	Cirque de Paris, Paris, France	Retained world middleweight title claim
57	Win	36–7–6 (8)	Georges Carpentier	TKO	18 (20)	Oct 23, 1912	Cirque de Paris, Paris, France	Retained world middleweight title claim
56	Loss	35–7–6 (8)	Leo Houck	NWS	6	Sep 27, 1912	Olympia A.C., Philadelphia, Pennsylvania, U.S.	
55	Loss	35–7–6 (7)	Jack Denning	NWS	10	Sep 25, 1912	St. Nicholas Arena, New York City, New York, U.S.	
54	Win	35–7–6 (6)	Marcel Moreau	TKO	16 (20)	Jun 29, 1912	Cirque de Paris, Paris, France	Retained world middleweight title claim
53	Win	34–7–6 (6)	Billy Leitch	TKO	2 (10)	May 2, 1912	New Amsterdam Opera House, New York City, New York, U.S.	
52	Loss	33–7–6 (6)	Frank Mantell	PTS	20	Feb 22, 1912	Sacramento, California, U.S.	Mantell claimed the world middleweight title; Papke continued to claim the title because he failed to make weight
51	Loss	33–6–6 (6)	Bob Moha	PTS	12	Oct 31, 1911	Arena (Armory A.A.), Boston, Massachusetts, U.S.	
50	Loss	33–5–6 (6)	Sailor Burke	NWS	10	Aug 22, 1911	St. Nicholas Arena, New York City, New York, U.S.	World middleweight title claim at stake; (via KO only)
49	Win	33–5–6 (5)	Jim Sullivan	KO	9 (20)	Jun 8, 1911	London Palladium, Argyle Street, Soho, London, England, U.K.	Won British world middleweight title
48	Win	32–5–6 (5)	Dave Smith	TKO	7 (20)	Mar 11, 1911	Sydney Stadium, Sydney, New South Wales, Australia	
47	Loss	31–5–6 (5)	Cyclone Johnny Thompson	PTS	20	Feb 11, 1911	Sydney Stadium, Sydney, New South Wales, Australia	Lost world middleweight title claim
46	Loss	31–4–6 (5)	Dave Smith	DQ	10 (20)	Dec 26, 1910	Sydney Stadium, Sydney, New South Wales, Australia	
45	Win	31–3–6 (5)	Ed Williams	TKO	6 (20)	Oct 26, 1910	Sydney Stadium, Sydney, New South Wales, Australia	Retained world middleweight title (Australian version)
44	Win	30–3–6 (5)	Jack "Twin" Sullivan	PTS	12	Jun 21, 1910	Armory, Boston, Massachusetts, U.S.	
43	Win	29–3–6 (5)	Al Goodale	DQ	2 (10)	Jun 14, 1910	Hippodrome, Kansas City, Missouri, U.S.	
42	Win	28–3–6 (5)	Joe Thomas	KO	16 (20)	May 19, 1910	Dreamland Rink, San Francisco, California, U.S.	
41	Win	27–3–6 (5)	Willie Lewis	KO	3 (15)	Mar 19, 1910	Cirque de Paris, Paris, France	Thinking Ketchel had relinquished the world middleweight title, Papke claimed it
40	Loss	26–3–6 (5)	Frank Klaus	NWS	6	Nov 11, 1909	Duquesne Garden, Pittsburgh, Pennsylvania, U.S.	
39	Win	26–3–6 (4)	Willie Lewis	NWS	6	Oct 8, 1909	Duquesne Garden, Pittsburgh, Pennsylvania, U.S.	
38	Draw	26–3–6 (3)	Fireman Jim Flynn	NWS	10	Jul 14, 1909	Naud Junction Pavilion, Los Angeles, California, U.S.	
37	Loss	26–3–6 (2)	Stanley Ketchel	UD	20	Jul 5, 1909	Mission Street Arena, Colma, California, U.S.	For world middleweight title
36	Win	26–2–6 (2)	Hugo Kelly	KO	1 (45)	May 15, 1909	Mission Street Arena, Colma, California, U.S.	
35	Loss	25–2–6 (2)	Fireman Jim Flynn	NWS	10	Mar 19, 1909	McCarey's Pavilion, Los Angeles, California, U.S.	
34	Draw	25–2–6 (1)	Hugo Kelly	PTS	25	Dec 15, 1908	Jeffries' Arena, Vernon, California, U.S.	
33	Loss	25–2–5 (1)	Stanley Ketchel	KO	11 (20)	Nov 26, 1908	Mission Street Arena, Colma, California, U.S.	Lost world middleweight title
32	Win	25–1–5 (1)	Stanley Ketchel	TKO	12 (25)	Sep 7, 1908	Jeffries' Arena, Vernon, California, U.S.	Won world middleweight title
31	Win	24–1–5 (1)	Sailor Burke	NWS	6	Aug 18, 1908	National A.C., New York City, New York, U.S.	
30	Win	24–1–5	Frank Mantell	TKO	1 (6)	Aug 13, 1908	Armory A.A., Boston, Massachusetts, U.S.	
29	Win	23–1–5	Johnny Carroll	TKO	2 (6)	Aug 13, 1908	Armory A.A., Boston, Massachusetts, U.S.	
28	Loss	22–1–5	Stanley Ketchel	PTS	10	Jun 4, 1908	Hippodrome, Milwaukee, Wisconsin, U.S.	Lost world middleweight title claim; For Ketchel's world middleweight title claim
27	Win	22–0–5	Hugo Kelly	PTS	10	Mar 16, 1908	Hippodrome, Milwaukee, Wisconsin, U.S.	Won American and world middleweight title claims
26	Win	21–0–5	Walter Stanton	TKO	4 (12)	Jan 21, 1908	Armory A.A., Boston, Massachusetts, U.S.	
25	Draw	20–0–5	Hugo Kelly	PTS	10	Dec 30, 1907	Schlitz Park, Milwaukee, Wisconsin, U.S.	For American and world middleweight title claims
24	Win	20–0–4	Bartley Connolly	TKO	4 (10)	Nov 22, 1907	Winnisimmet A.C., Chelsea, Massachusetts, U.S.	
23	Win	19–0–4	Charlie Haghey	TKO	1 (10)	Nov 22, 1907	Winnisimmet A.C., Chelsea, Massachusetts, U.S.	
22	Win	18–0–4	Tony Caponi	KO	2 (10)	Nov 14, 1907	Peoria A.C., Peoria, Illinois, U.S.	
21	Draw	17–0–4	Pat O'Keefe	PTS	6	Nov 9, 1907	National A.C., Philadelphia, Pennsylvania, U.S.	
20	Win	17–0–3	Cy Flynn	TKO	3 (10)	Oct 30, 1907	Pavillion, Brazil, Indiana, U.S.	
19	Win	16–0–3	Terry Martin	KO	3 (6)	Sep 14, 1907	National A.C., Philadelphia, Pennsylvania, U.S.	
18	Win	15–0–3	Tommy Sullivan	KO	1 (15)	Sep 2, 1907	Glen Forest Park, Methuen, Massachusetts, U.S.	
17	Draw	14–0–3	Tony Caponi	PTS	10	Jun 20, 1907	Spring Valley, Illinois, U.S.	
16	Win	14–0–2	Foster Walker	KO	2 (10)	Jun 14, 1907	Light Guard Armory, Detroit, Michigan, U.S.	
15	Win	13–0–2	Jack Morgan	KO	7 (10)	Jun 6, 1907	Peoria, Illinois, U.S.	
14	Draw	12–0–2	Tony Caponi	PTS	15	May 21, 1907	Davenport A.C., Davenport, Iowa, U.S.	
13	Win	12–0–1	Johnny Carroll	KO	4 (10)	Apr 30, 1907	Peoria A.C., Peoria, Illinois, U.S.	
12	Draw	11–0–1	Billy Rhodes	PTS	15	Mar 26, 1907	Davenport A.C., Davenport, Iowa, U.S.	
11	Win	11–0	Billy Rhodes	PTS	10	Mar 6, 1907	Peoria A.C., Peoria, Illinois, U.S.	
10	Win	10–0	Carl Anderson	KO	1 (10)	Feb 14, 1907	Spring Valley A.C., Spring Valley, Illinois, U.S.	
9	Win	9–0	Dick Fitzpatrick	PTS	10	Jan 29, 1907	Peoria A.C., Peoria, Illinois, U.S.	
8	Win	8–0	Tommy Wallace	KO	3 (10)	Jan 15, 1907	Riverside A.C., Peoria, Illinois, U.S.	
7	Win	7–0	Kid Farmer	KO	6 (10)	Dec 17, 1906	Riverside A.C., Peoria, Illinois, U.S.	
6	Win	6–0	Milt Kinney	KO	3 (10)	Nov 27, 1906	Peoria A.C., Peoria, Illinois, U.S.	
5	Win	5–0	Carl Purdy	TKO	7 (10)	Jul 4, 1906	La Salle, Illinois, U.S.	
4	Win	4–0	Jack Denny	KO	1 (6)	Jun 1, 1906	Peru, Illinois, U.S.	
3	Win	3–0	Buster Teegan	KO	3 (6)	May 30, 1906	Turn Hall, La Salle, Illinois, U.S.	
2	Win	2–0	Red Morrisey	KO	3 (4)	Apr 30, 1906	Jones's Club, La Salle, Illinois, U.S.	
1	Win	1–0	Mexican Wonder	PTS	4	Mar 24, 1906	La Salle, Illinois, U.S.	

=== Unofficial record ===
63 fights	39 wins	17 losses
By knockout	31	1
By decision	7	14
By disqualification	1	2
Draws	7	

Record with the inclusion of newspaper decisions to the win/loss/draw column.

No.	Result	Record	Opponent	Type	Round	Date	Location	Notes
63	Loss	39–17–7	Jimmy Darcy	PTS	4	May 14, 1919	Dreamland Arena, San Diego, California, U.S.	
62	Loss	39–16–7	Jakob "Soldier" Bartfield	PTS	4	Apr 8, 1919	Coliseum, San Francisco, California, U.S.	
61	Loss	39–15–7	Jack Smith	NWS	10	Jun 1, 1916	Clermont Avenue Rink, Brooklyn, New York City, New York, U.S.	
60	Loss	39–14–7	Marty Rowan	PTS	8	Oct 14, 1913	Future City A.C., Saint Louis, Missouri, U.S.	
59	Loss	39–13–7	Frank Klaus	RTD	6 (20)	Mar 5, 1913	Cirque de Paris, Paris, France	Lost world middleweight title claim; For Klaus' world middleweight title claim
58	Win	39–12–7	Georges Bernard	RTD	6 (20)	Dec 4, 1912	Cirque de Paris, Paris, France	Retained world middleweight title claim
57	Win	38–12–7	Georges Carpentier	TKO	18 (20)	Oct 23, 1912	Cirque de Paris, Paris, France	Retained world middleweight title claim
56	Loss	37–12–7	Leo Houck	NWS	6	Sep 27, 1912	Olympia A.C., Philadelphia, Pennsylvania, U.S.	
55	Loss	37–11–7	Jack Denning	NWS	10	Sep 25, 1912	St. Nicholas Arena, New York City, New York, U.S.	
54	Win	37–10–7	Marcel Moreau	TKO	16 (20)	Jun 29, 1912	Cirque de Paris, Paris, France	Retained world middleweight title claim
53	Win	36–10–7	Billy Leitch	TKO	2 (10)	May 2, 1912	New Amsterdam Opera House, New York City, New York, U.S.	
52	Loss	35–10–7	Frank Mantell	PTS	20	Feb 22, 1912	Sacramento, California, U.S.	Mantell claimed the world middleweight title; Papke continued to claim the title because he failed to make weight
51	Loss	35–9–7	Bob Moha	PTS	12	Oct 31, 1911	Arena (Armory A.A.), Boston, Massachusetts, U.S.	
50	Loss	35–8–7	Sailor Burke	NWS	10	Aug 22, 1911	St. Nicholas Arena, New York City, New York, U.S.	World middleweight title claim at stake; (via KO only)
49	Win	35–7–7	Jim Sullivan	KO	9 (20)	Jun 8, 1911	London Palladium, Argyle Street, Soho, London, England, U.K.	Won British world middleweight title
48	Win	34–7–7	Dave Smith	TKO	7 (20)	Mar 11, 1911	Sydney Stadium, Sydney, New South Wales, Australia	
47	Loss	33–7–7	Cyclone Johnny Thompson	PTS	20	Feb 11, 1911	Sydney Stadium, Sydney, New South Wales, Australia	Lost world middleweight title claim
46	Loss	33–6–7	Dave Smith	DQ	10 (20)	Dec 26, 1910	Sydney Stadium, Sydney, New South Wales, Australia	
45	Win	33–5–7	Ed Williams	TKO	6 (20)	Oct 26, 1910	Sydney Stadium, Sydney, New South Wales, Australia	Retained world middleweight title (Australian version)
44	Win	32–5–7	Jack "Twin" Sullivan	PTS	12	Jun 21, 1910	Armory, Boston, Massachusetts, U.S.	
43	Win	31–5–7	Al Goodale	DQ	2 (10)	Jun 14, 1910	Hippodrome, Kansas City, Missouri, U.S.	
42	Win	30–5–7	Joe Thomas	KO	16 (20)	May 19, 1910	Dreamland Rink, San Francisco, California, U.S.	
41	Win	29–5–7	Willie Lewis	KO	3 (15)	Mar 19, 1910	Cirque de Paris, Paris, France	Thinking Ketchel had relinquished the world middleweight title, Papke claimed it
40	Loss	28–5–7	Frank Klaus	NWS	6	Nov 11, 1909	Duquesne Garden, Pittsburgh, Pennsylvania, U.S.	
39	Win	28–4–7	Willie Lewis	NWS	6	Oct 8, 1909	Duquesne Garden, Pittsburgh, Pennsylvania, U.S.	
38	Draw	27–4–7	Fireman Jim Flynn	NWS	10	Jul 14, 1909	Naud Junction Pavilion, Los Angeles, California, U.S.	
37	Loss	27–4–6	Stanley Ketchel	UD	20	Jul 5, 1909	Mission Street Arena, Colma, California, U.S.	For world middleweight title
36	Win	27–3–6	Hugo Kelly	KO	1 (45)	May 15, 1909	Mission Street Arena, Colma, California, U.S.	
35	Loss	26–3–6	Fireman Jim Flynn	NWS	10	Mar 19, 1909	McCarey's Pavilion, Los Angeles, California, U.S.	
34	Draw	26–2–6	Hugo Kelly	PTS	25	Dec 15, 1908	Jeffries' Arena, Vernon, California, U.S.	
33	Loss	26–2–5	Stanley Ketchel	KO	11 (20)	Nov 26, 1908	Mission Street Arena, Colma, California, U.S.	Lost world middleweight title
32	Win	26–1–5	Stanley Ketchel	TKO	12 (25)	Sep 7, 1908	Jeffries' Arena, Vernon, California, U.S.	Won world middleweight title
31	Win	25–1–5	Sailor Burke	NWS	6	Aug 18, 1908	National A.C., New York City, New York, U.S.	
30	Win	24–1–5	Frank Mantell	TKO	1 (6)	Aug 13, 1908	Armory A.A., Boston, Massachusetts, U.S.	
29	Win	23–1–5	Johnny Carroll	TKO	2 (6)	Aug 13, 1908	Armory A.A., Boston, Massachusetts, U.S.	
28	Loss	22–1–5	Stanley Ketchel	PTS	10	Jun 4, 1908	Hippodrome, Milwaukee, Wisconsin, U.S.	Lost world middleweight title claim; For Ketchel's world middleweight title claim
27	Win	22–0–5	Hugo Kelly	PTS	10	Mar 16, 1908	Hippodrome, Milwaukee, Wisconsin, U.S.	Won American and world middleweight title claims
26	Win	21–0–5	Walter Stanton	TKO	4 (12)	Jan 21, 1908	Armory A.A., Boston, Massachusetts, U.S.	
25	Draw	20–0–5	Hugo Kelly	PTS	10	Dec 30, 1907	Schlitz Park, Milwaukee, Wisconsin, U.S.	For American and world middleweight title claims
24	Win	20–0–4	Bartley Connolly	TKO	4 (10)	Nov 22, 1907	Winnisimmet A.C., Chelsea, Massachusetts, U.S.	
23	Win	19–0–4	Charlie Haghey	TKO	1 (10)	Nov 22, 1907	Winnisimmet A.C., Chelsea, Massachusetts, U.S.	
22	Win	18–0–4	Tony Caponi	KO	2 (10)	Nov 14, 1907	Peoria A.C., Peoria, Illinois, U.S.	
21	Draw	17–0–4	Pat O'Keefe	PTS	6	Nov 9, 1907	National A.C., Philadelphia, Pennsylvania, U.S.	
20	Win	17–0–3	Cy Flynn	TKO	3 (10)	Oct 30, 1907	Pavillion, Brazil, Indiana, U.S.	
19	Win	16–0–3	Terry Martin	KO	3 (6)	Sep 14, 1907	National A.C., Philadelphia, Pennsylvania, U.S.	
18	Win	15–0–3	Tommy Sullivan	KO	1 (15)	Sep 2, 1907	Glen Forest Park, Methuen, Massachusetts, U.S.	
17	Draw	14–0–3	Tony Caponi	PTS	10	Jun 20, 1907	Spring Valley, Illinois, U.S.	
16	Win	14–0–2	Foster Walker	KO	2 (10)	Jun 14, 1907	Light Guard Armory, Detroit, Michigan, U.S.	
15	Win	13–0–2	Jack Morgan	KO	7 (10)	Jun 6, 1907	Peoria, Illinois, U.S.	
14	Draw	12–0–2	Tony Caponi	PTS	15	May 21, 1907	Davenport A.C., Davenport, Iowa, U.S.	
13	Win	12–0–1	Johnny Carroll	KO	4 (10)	Apr 30, 1907	Peoria A.C., Peoria, Illinois, U.S.	
12	Draw	11–0–1	Billy Rhodes	PTS	15	Mar 26, 1907	Davenport A.C., Davenport, Iowa, U.S.	
11	Win	11–0	Billy Rhodes	PTS	10	Mar 6, 1907	Peoria A.C., Peoria, Illinois, U.S.	
10	Win	10–0	Carl Anderson	KO	1 (10)	Feb 14, 1907	Spring Valley A.C., Spring Valley, Illinois, U.S.	
9	Win	9–0	Dick Fitzpatrick	PTS	10	Jan 29, 1907	Peoria A.C., Peoria, Illinois, U.S.	
8	Win	8–0	Tommy Wallace	KO	3 (10)	Jan 15, 1907	Riverside A.C., Peoria, Illinois, U.S.	
7	Win	7–0	Kid Farmer	KO	6 (10)	Dec 17, 1906	Riverside A.C., Peoria, Illinois, U.S.	
6	Win	6–0	Milt Kinney	KO	3 (10)	Nov 27, 1906	Peoria A.C., Peoria, Illinois, U.S.	
5	Win	5–0	Carl Purdy	TKO	7 (10)	Jul 4, 1906	La Salle, Illinois, U.S.	
4	Win	4–0	Jack Denny	KO	1 (6)	Jun 1, 1906	Peru, Illinois, U.S.	
3	Win	3–0	Buster Teegan	KO	3 (6)	May 30, 1906	Turn Hall, La Salle, Illinois, U.S.	
2	Win	2–0	Red Morrisey	KO	3 (4)	Apr 30, 1906	Jones's Club, La Salle, Illinois, U.S.	
1	Win	1–0	Mexican Wonder	PTS	4	Mar 24, 1906	La Salle, Illinois, U.S.	

== Primary boxing achievements and honors ==
Achievements
Preceded by Stanley Ketchel	World Middleweight Champion; September 7, 1908 – November 26, 1908	Succeeded by Stanley Ketchel

== See also ==
- List of middleweight boxing champions
