= Sailor Burke =

American boxer (1885–1960)

Charles Presser
- Presser in 1911

Personal information
- Nickname: Sailor Burke
- Nationality: American
- Born: 1885 Brooklyn, New York
- Died: 1960 (age 75)
- Height: 5 ft 9.5 in (1.77 m)
- Weight: Welterweight

Boxing career
- Stance: Orthodox

Boxing record
- Total fights: 59
- Wins: 24
- Win by KO: 19
- Losses: 7
- Draws: 3
- No contests: 0

Charles Presser (1885–1960), who fought under the name Sailor Burke, was an accomplished New York welter and middleweight boxer who often competed against light heavyweights including several contenders and champions. These included controversial black heavyweight champion Jack Johnson, American welterweight contender and European champion Willie Lewis, and British world middleweight champion Billy Papke.

On August 22, 1911, Burke defeated world welterweight claimant Billy Papke, at St. Nicholas Arena in New York City, but could not claim the title as both men were fighting over the middleweight limit of 160. Papke was defending his World Middleweight title which he claimed from Jim Sullivan in a British World Middleweight Championship match, in a winning ninth round knockout two months earlier on June 8, 1911 at London's Palladium.

== Early life and career ==
Charles Presser, known by the ringname "Sailor Burke" was born in 1885 in New York city. He began his career by 1904, focusing first in Philadelphia, and then primarily the New York City area, featuring many short 3-6 round bouts in well known clubs. According to one boxing history, he lost only seven of his first 29 reported fights.

== Professional career ==
=== Burke's rare knockout of Philadelphia boxer Joe Grim, 1906 ===
On May 21, 1906, Burke became one of the only men to knock out Philadelphia boxer Joe Grim in the third round of four at Remson Athletic Club in New York. The Brooklyn Daily Eagle wrote that Grim was down once in the second and three times in the third. He defeated Grim again easily on June 21, 1906, and April 4, 1906 in two six round newspaper decisions in Philadelphia.

=== Burke's historic bout with world heavyweight champion Jack Johnson, 1907 ===
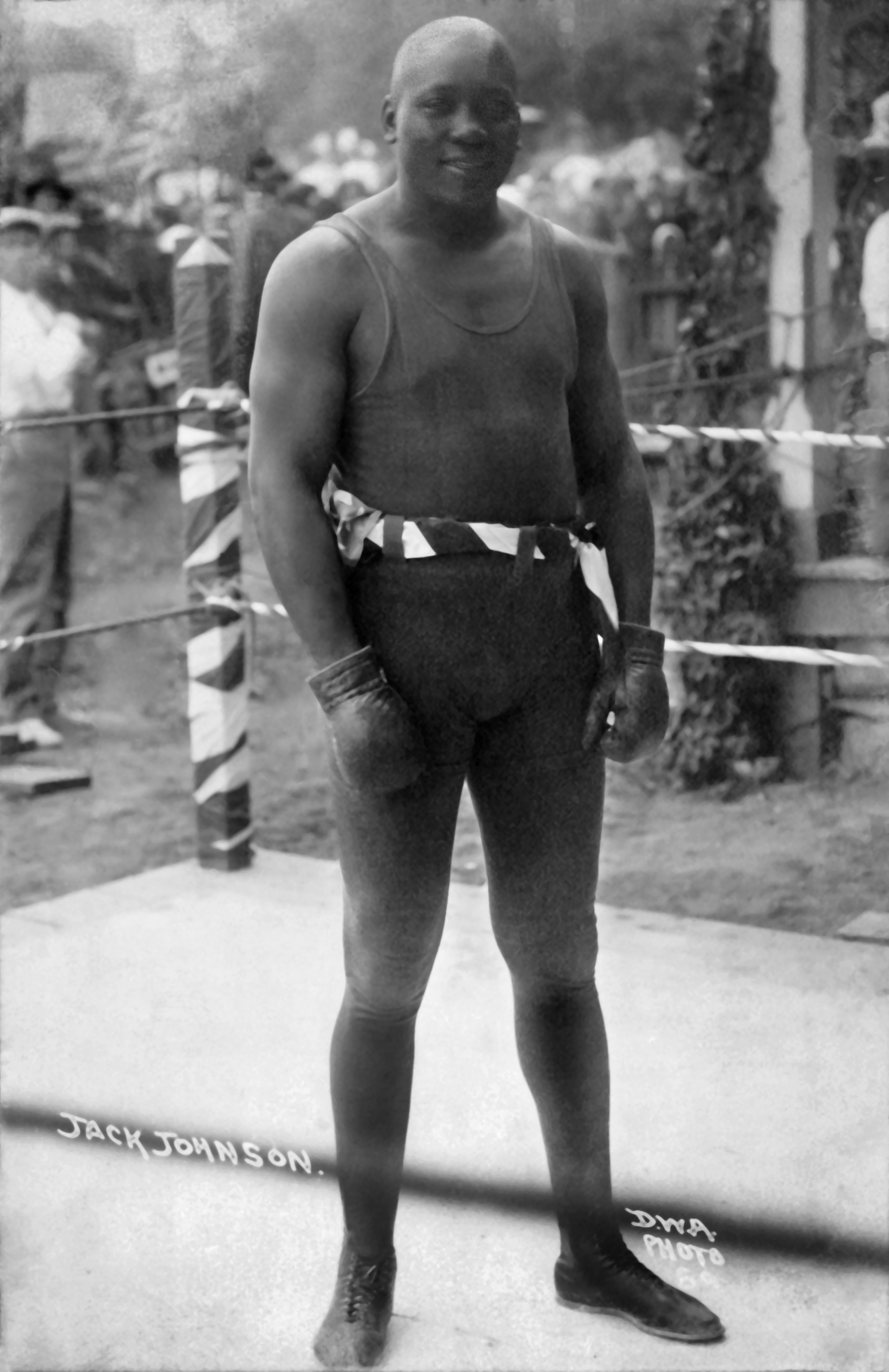
Heavyweight Jack Johnson circa 1910

Before a sizable crowd of 5000, on September 12, 1907, Burke fought black heavyweight champion Jack Johnson at Smith's Theatre in Bridgeport, Connecticut, losing decisively in a one-sided six round newspaper decision. Clearly outmatched, Burke was knocked down at least once in every round. Johnson's dominance aroused suspicion among some in the crowd that the bout was fixed. Burke fought with a 23 pound disadvantage in weight, though only a two inch disadvantage in height.

As expected, the heavier Johnson showed superior strength, but his scientific boxing skills, and hitting accuracy dominated in a bout where Burke was knocked to the floor fourteen times in the six rounds. After the third round, Burke hugged and clinched frequently to avoid the blows of Johnson. In the fifth, Burke was down three times. The Buffalo Evening News praised Burke for lasting six rounds with such a superior opponent and avoiding a loss by knockout, particularly in the sixth when Johnson worked hardest to achieve one. Burke's bout with the black heavyweight champion Johnson attracted more attention and probably had more press coverage than any of Burke's other matches.

=== First bout with future world middleweight champion Billy Papke, 1908 ===
On August 18, 1908, he lost to the great Billy Papke in a six round newspaper decision at the National Athletic Club in New York. Papke would wrest the world middleweight championship from Stanley Ketchell only three weeks later. According to the Decatur Daily Review, "Papke's lead at the end was too clear to make any decision necessary".

On August 31, 1909 he lost to Jim Flynn of Boston, in twelve rounds of tough fighting at Boston's Armory Athletic Club. Burke received a warning from the referee for hitting on the breaks. The final rounds belonged to Flynn with Burke having to clinch often to protect himself.

=== Three matches with world welterweight contender and European champion Willie Lewis, 1909-11 ===
Burke fought the outstanding American welterweight contender Willie Lewis three times, though lost each bout in the opinion of most newspapers or by points or knockout. His first loss on August 13, 1909 ended in a third round knockout at the Fairmont Athletic Club in the Bronx. The first three rounds revealed each fighter down at least once, with both fighters down simultaneously in the third. In their second meeting on October 21, 1910, in New York, Burke lost in a ten round points decision.

In their final meeting on March 9, 1911, Burke lost in a ten round newspaper decision of the New York Times to the skilled Lewis who was then boxing as a middleweight. The early part of the bout included a great deal of clinching and was fought at a slow pace. In the last five rounds, Lewis dominated but Burke managed to stay on his feet against his skilled opponent. Lewis's most telling punch was his stinging left to the head. A formidable opponent, Lewis contended three times for the World Welterweight Title in Europe from 1909–10, twice with the great Harry Lewis in Paris. On May 2, 1908, Lewis defeated Walter Stanton in Paris in a match billed as the World 150 lbs Welterweight Title.

He defeated Jack "Twin" Sullivan, brother of 1907 world welterweight champion Mike "Twin" Sullivan, on April 4, 1910 at the Marathon Athletic Club in Brooklyn, in a ten round newspaper decision of the New York Times.

=== Bout with world welterweight contender Frank Mantell, 1910 ===
On December 2, 1910, Burke lost a well-publicized ten round newspaper decision to Frank Mantell, a former world welterweight contender, at the New Amsterdam Opera House in New York. Burke took a great deal of punishment in the bout from his accomplished opponent, and was fighting as a heavyweight at this late point in his career. Burke got in several good jabs in the fourth, but then retreated and fought from a distance. As was his habit with superior opponents, he clinched frequently, though Mantell often dealt some of his best blows during clinches. Mantell had previously fought welterweight champions Harry Lewis and Honey Mellody in November 1907 and January 1908 in bouts billed but not sanctioned as world championships. Mantell defeated Mellody in a fifteenth round knockout in their January bout, though no title was passed to him.

On April 10, 1911 he fought Dan Sullivan of Montana at the New York Athletic Club and won. On May 9, 1911 he lost to Dan's brother, Montana Jack Sullivan, at the Olympic Athletic Club.

=== Later career, and boxing retirement ===
==== Win over World Middleweight claimant Billy Papke, 1911 ====
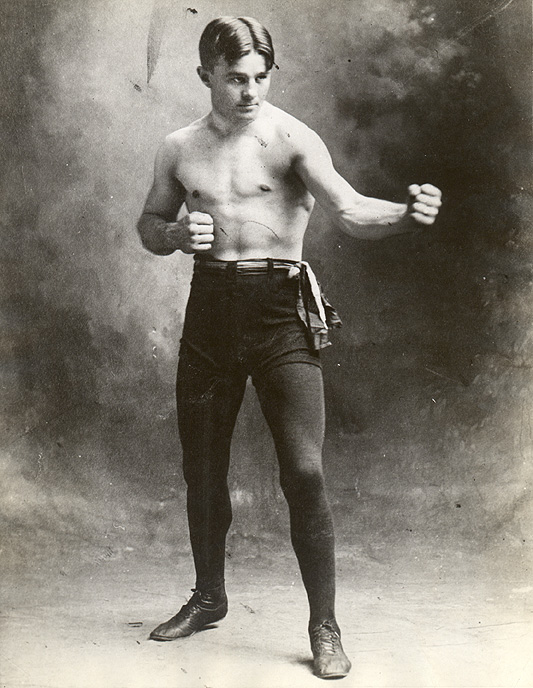
Middleweight champion Billy Papke circa 1910

On August 22, 1911, he defeated Billy Papke, two time World Middleweight contender, at St. Nicholas Arena in New York City in a newspaper decision of the New York Times. Papke was defending his World Middleweight title which he claimed from Jim Sullivan in a British World Middleweight Championship match, in a winning ninth round knockout two months earlier on June 8, 1911 at London's Palladium. Despite Papke's claim, the title did not pass hands as both men were over the middleweight weight limit of 160, and weighing nearer 165. Papke had no claim to the American title that August, as it was not recognized by boxing authorities, who credited Papke with the title only from September 7 to November 1908, when he defeated and then again lost to reigning champion Stanley Ketchell.

Burke battered Papke, but used little science in his approach. Attending the fight was the Marquis of Queensbury, credited with the invention of modern boxing rules.

On October 17, 1911, he knocked out heavyweight Alfred "Soldier" Kearns in the second round in New York. The bout included both clinching and wrestling in clinches, and Kearns did not appear in top form. Burke dropped Kearns to the mat in the second round and after an aggressive flurry of punches dropped him again. While Kearns remained there, many in the dissatisfied crowd filed out.

His last fight was in 1912 against Bob Moha. Sailor Burke died in 1960.
