= In Old Oklahoma =

1943 film by Albert S. Rogell

- Theatrical poster
- Directed by: Albert S. Rogell
- Screenplay by: Ethel Hill; Eleanore Griffin
- Based on: story and adaptation by Thomson Burtis
- Produced by: Robert North
- Starring: John Wayne; Martha Scott; Albert Dekker; Marjorie Rambeau; George "Gabby" Hayes; Grant Withers
- Cinematography: Jack A. Marta
- Edited by: Ernest J. Nims
- Music by: Walter Scharf
- Production company: Republic Pictures
- Distributed by: Republic Pictures
- Release date: December 6, 1943 (United States)
- Running time: 102 minutes
- Country: United States
- Language: English
- Box office: $2.5 million (US rentals)

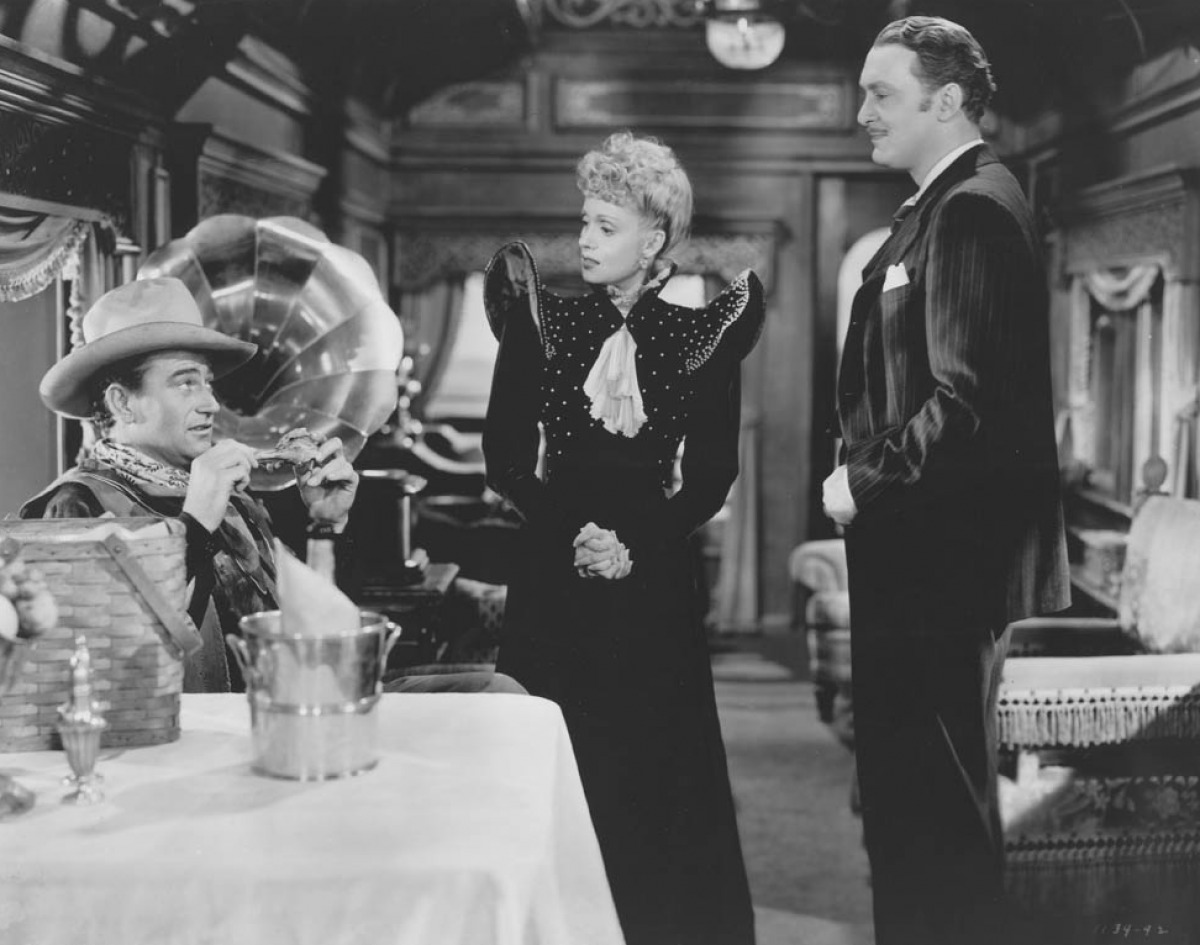
John Wayne, Martha Scott & Albert Dekker

In Old Oklahoma (reissued as War of the Wildcats) is a 1943 American Western film directed by Albert S. Rogell starring John Wayne and Martha Scott. The film was nominated for two Academy Awards, one for Music Score of a Dramatic or Comedy Picture and the other for Sound Recording (Daniel J. Bloomberg). The supporting cast features George "Gabby" Hayes, Marjorie Rambeau, Dale Evans, Sidney Blackmer as Theodore Roosevelt, and Paul Fix.

== Plot ==
Eastern school teacher Catherine Allen becomes notorious in 1906 when it is learned that she has authored a romance novel. She decides to move west and begin a new life.

On the train, oil man Jim Gardner makes a pass at her. Catherine asks a cowboy, Dan Somers, to sit nearby as a safety measure. Both are on their way to Oklahoma, with stagecoach driver Despirit Dean tagging along with his friend Dan.

Many people in Sapulpa are upset with Jim's business tactics. A farmer feels he was paid too little for his property after Jim discovers oil there. Jim is furious when Dan strongly discourages Chief Big Tree from selling Indian land at too low an offer.

Dan travels to Washington, D.C., to ask President Theodore Roosevelt about oil rights. He fought for Teddy and the Rough Riders a few years before. Teddy offers him a chance to transport thousands of barrels of oil to a Tulsa refinery to win the rights over Jim, which leads to Jim's hired man, the Cherokee Kid, setting off an explosion and sabotaging the trip.

Catherine and Dan fall in love, with hotel owner Bessie Baxter playing matchmaker. A final fistfight between Dan and Jim settles matters once and for all.

== Cast ==
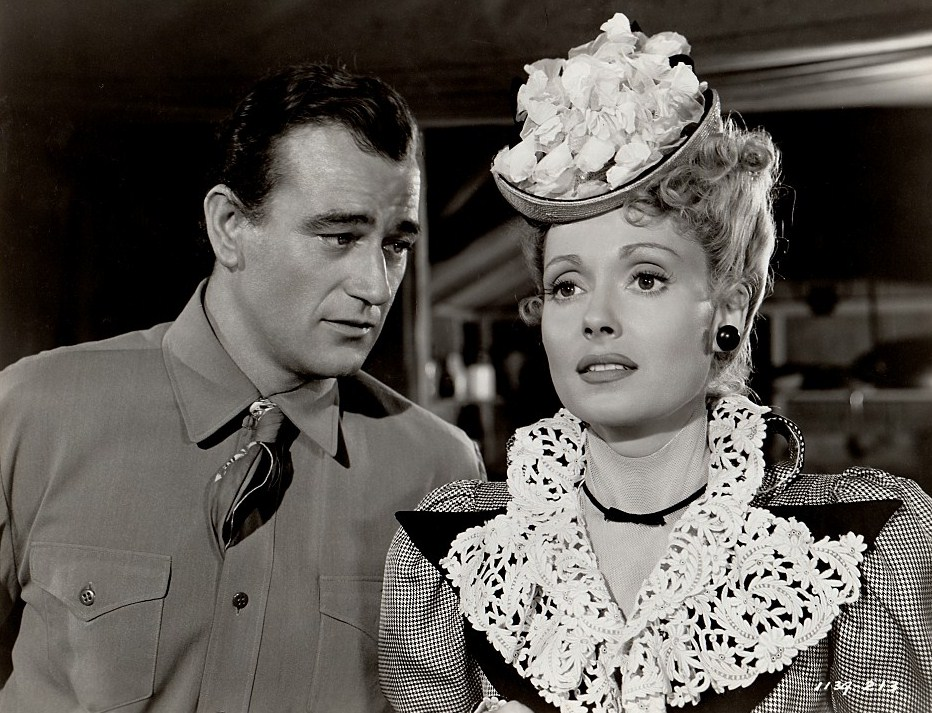
John Wayne and Martha Scott, promotional still

- John Wayne as Daniel F. Somers
- Martha Scott as Catherine Elizabeth Allen
- Albert Dekker as Jim "Hunk" Gardner
- George "Gabby" Hayes as Despirit Dean
- Marjorie Rambeau as Bessie Baxter
- Dale Evans as Cuddles Walker
- Grant Withers as Richardson
- Sidney Blackmer as Theodore Roosevelt
- Paul Fix as the Cherokee Kid
- Cecil Cunningham as Mrs. Ames
- Irving Bacon as Ben
- Byron Foulger as Wilkins
- Anne O'Neal as Mrs. Peabody
- Richard Graham as Walter Ames
- Tom London as Tom (uncredited)
- Robert Warwick as Chief Big Tree (uncredited)

== Production ==
=== Development ===
In December 1941 it was announced Republic Pictures had bought an "oilfield story" War of the Wildcats by Thomson Burtis, as a vehicle for Ray Middleton. They announced it for production in 1942. In December 1942, it was announced Frances Hyland was working on the script and that the film would be a vehicle for John Wayne.

The film still took a number of months to move into production. Eleanor Griffin and Ethel Hill were hired to work on the script "which puts the feature in the big league class" according to the Los Angeles Times. They were "to give the story the epic flavor."

The movie was retitled In Old Oklahoma and filming was to start 15 June 1943. Martha Scott was signed for the female lead, which was seen as a coup for Republic because she was associated with prestigious films such as Our Town (1940).

The film was allocated a bigger budget than usual for a Republic Pictures film.

=== Shooting ===
Filming took place near Bakersfield.

Parts of the film were shot in Johnson Canyon, Paria, Utah, Cedar City, and Virgin, Utah.

== Release ==
Republic Pictures released it on December 6, 1943.

The film did extremely well at the box office and encouraged Republic to make more bigger budgeted films.

The movie was reissued in 1947 as War of the Wildcats.

=== Lawsuit ===
Screenwriter Griffin's ex-husband, William Rankin, later launched a $115,000 lawsuit against Griffin, Hill, Burtis and Republic, alleging the script included elements in three original scripts of his that he submitted to Republic: Indian Territory, Gasoline War, and Fire in Heaven. He alleged that the writers were hired to combine his scripts into the story of In Old Oklahoma but that he received no compensation.

== See also ==
- John Wayne filmography
- Public domain film
- List of American films of 1943
- List of films in the public domain in the United States
