= Stanley Ketchel =

American boxer (1886–1910)

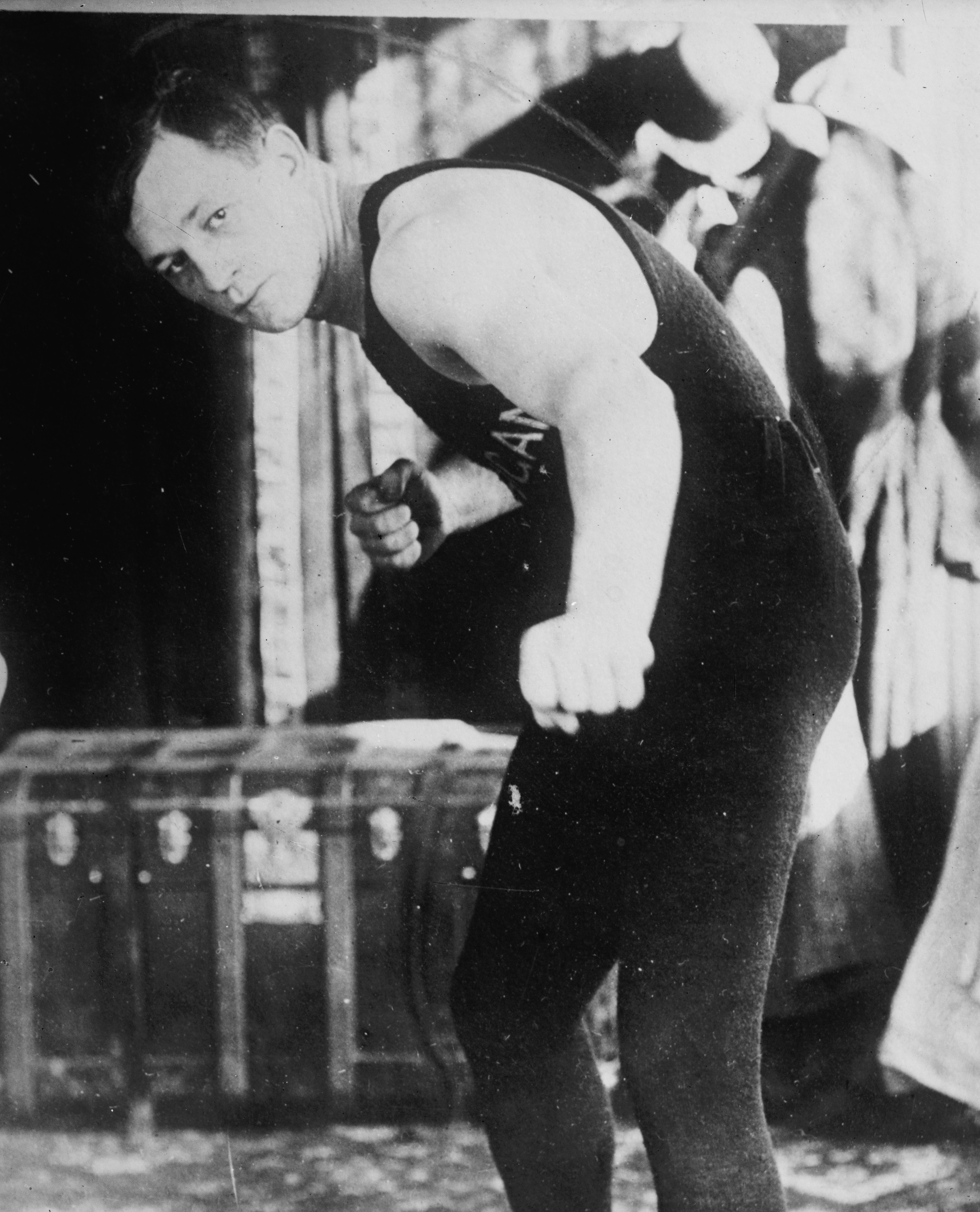
- c. 1910

Personal information
- Nickname: Michigan Assassin
- Born: Stanisław Kiecal; September 14, 1886 Grand Rapids, Michigan, U.S.
- Died: October 15, 1910 (aged 24) Springfield, Missouri, U.S.
- Height: 5 ft 9 in (175 cm)
- Weight: Middleweight; Heavyweight

Boxing career
- Reach: 70 in (178 cm)

Boxing record
- Total fights: 62
- Wins: 51
- Win by KO: 46
- Losses: 7
- Draws: 3
- No contests: 1

Stanisław Kiecal (September 14, 1886 – October 15, 1910), better known in the boxing world as Stanley Ketchel, was an American professional boxer who became one of the greatest World Middleweight Champions in history. He was nicknamed "The Michigan Assassin." He was murdered at a ranch in Conway, Missouri, at the age of 24.

== Biography ==
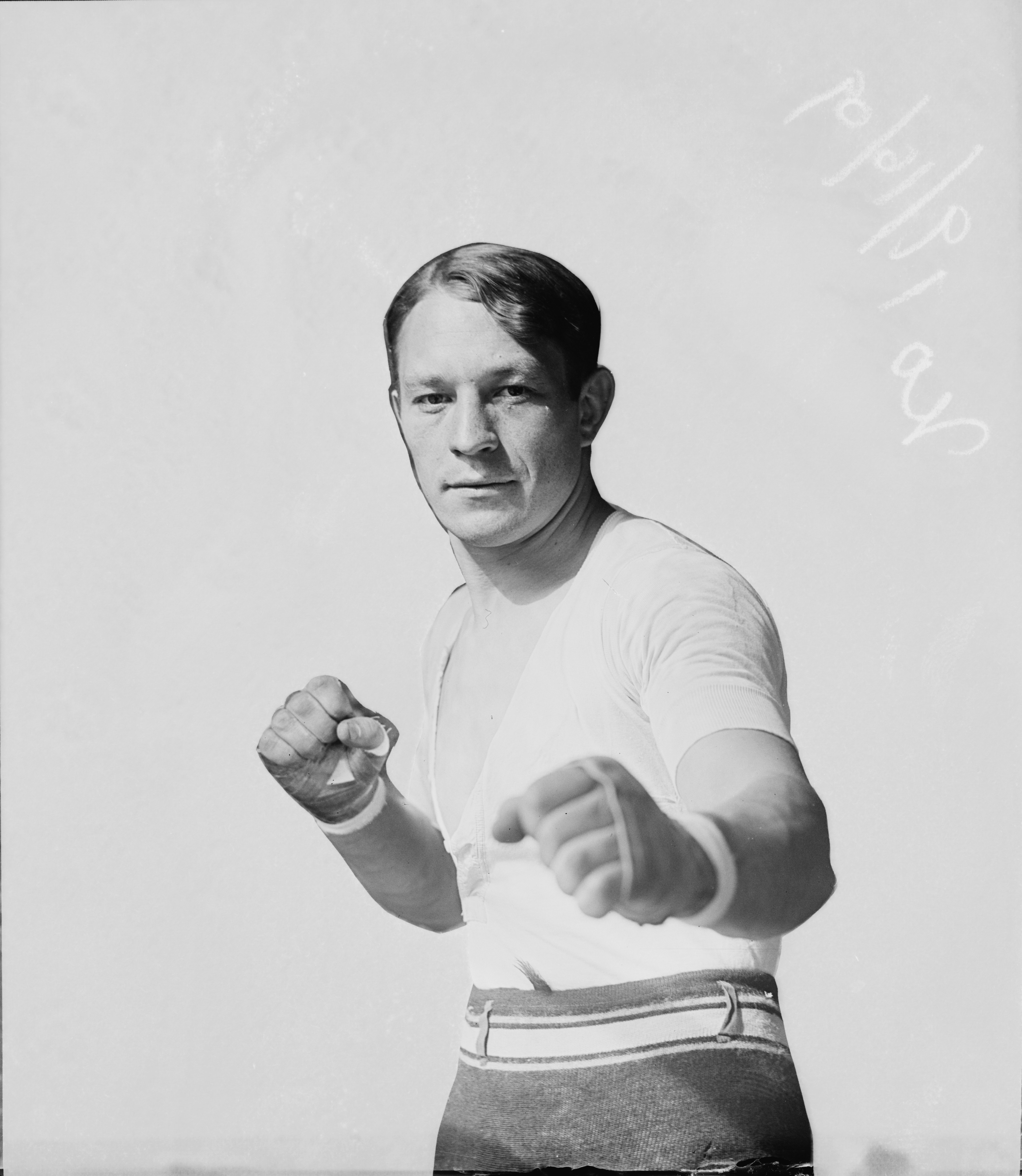
Ketchel in fighting pose

He was born in 1886 in Grand Rapids, Michigan, to Tomasz and Julia (née Olbinska) Kiecal, whose family immigrated from the village of Sulmierzyce in Piotrków Governorate, in modern-day central Poland.

He avoided school, instead falling in with a gang of street kids and often getting into fist fights. At twelve years old, he ran away from home, becoming a child hobo. As a teenager he lived in Butte, Montana, where he found employment first as a hotel bellhop and then as a bouncer. This profession obviously led to many scraps that established his reputation as the best fist fighter in town. Soon enough sixteen-year-old Stanley was performing in backroom boxing matches with older locals for twenty dollars a week. He began traveling throughout Montana, offering to take on any man brave enough to face him. Between 1903 and 1906, he lost just twice in thirty-nine contests and, in 1907, moved to California, where he knew most of boxing's big names and big fights waited for him.

== Professional boxing career ==
Only a middleweight, Ketchel was also known for taking on heavyweights, who sometimes outweighed him by more than 30 pounds (14 kg). According to hearsay, before each of his fights, he would imagine that his opponent had insulted his mother, with whom he had a very close relationship; thus, his anger would motivate him to fight with fury.

He started boxing professionally in 1903, at 16, in Butte, Montana. In his first fight, Ketchel knocked out Kid Tracy in one round. In his second fight, he was beaten by decision in six rounds by Maurice Thompson. He boxed his first 41 bouts in Montana, and had a record of 36 wins, two losses, and three draws during that span. He lost once more to Thompson in their rematch and then controversially drew with him in their rubber match, in a bout that many people thought Ketchel had won. Afterwards, he went on to beat Tom Kingsley, among others, before moving his campaign on to California in 1907.

There, he won three fights that year, and drew one in Marysville against the man many considered the World Middleweight Champion, Joe Thomas. In his next bout, Thomas and he had a rematch and Ketchel won, by knockout in 32 rounds. Ketchel was then recognized by many as the World Middleweight Champion. He finished the year by beating Thomas again, this time by decision.

== Middleweight champion ==
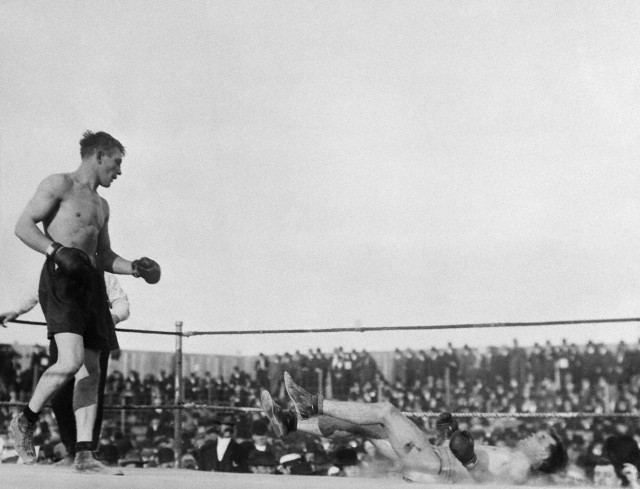
Ketchel standing over a downed Billy Papke during their third fight

On February 8, 1908, Ketchel met the man who was generally recognized as the World Welterweight Champion and one of the leading middleweights of the era, Mike "Twin" Sullivan, knocking him out in the first round and winning general recognition as World Middleweight Champion. Sullivan often fought above the welterweight limit, making him a light middleweight. Whether Ketchel became world champion when he defeated Thomas or Mike Sullivan has always been up to debate, but the fact remains that Mike Sullivan and not Thomas is historically remembered as a world champion.

He proceeded to retain the title against Mike's twin brother, Jack "Twin" Sullivan, also a former world champion, by a knockout in 20 rounds; against future world champion Billy Papke by decision in 10; against Hugo Kelly by a knockout in three and against Thomas, by a knockout in two.

Then, he lost the belt to Papke by a knockout in 12, but Papke and he had an immediate rematch and Ketchel regained the title when he beat Papke by a knockout in 11 in their third match.

Ketchel began 1909 by fighting former Light Heavyweight Champion Philadelphia Jack O'Brien. Ketchel survived a terrible beating at the hand of the slick, quick O'Brien in the early rounds, only to mount a terrific comeback and score four knockdowns in the ninth and tenth rounds. When the final bell rang at the end of the 10th round, O'Brien was lying unconscious on the mat, his head in a resin box in his corner. Under New York rules at the time, though, O'Brien had been saved by the bell and because official decisions were outlawed in New York boxing, the fight was declared a "no decision". A few weeks later, Ketchel had a rematch with O' Brien, knocking out Philadelphia Jack in three rounds.

A fourth fight with Billy Papke followed. Ketchel again won in a tumultuous slugfest to defend his championship and end their series of fights with a record of 3-1 in their four encounters. This (fourth) fight took place in the outdoor Mission Street Arena in Colma, California, during a terrible thunderstorm, yet neither fighter relented in his pursuit of victory until Stanley took the 20-round decision.

Ketchel fought Sam Langford on April 27, 1910. It was a hard-pressed fight by both men, each displaying terrific hitting power for all six rounds of the short bout. No knock downs were scored and both had plenty of energy in the end. Langford won by decision. A longer rematch bout was rumored, but never happened. Some disputed the decision, although a majority of people felt that Langford had won the bout, which following a decision-appealing vote, it was decided (in an uncontroversial manner) that it would stand as a decision win for Langford.

=== Ketchel vs. Johnson ===
Ketchel's 1909 battle with Jack Johnson has been called by many a modern-day "David and Goliath". In the 12th round, Ketchel floored Johnson with a right hand. Johnson got up and knocked out Ketchel with a right uppercut.

Ketchel and Johnson were rumored to have been friends and to have gone gambling, as well as hit the brothels, together; they shared a love for women. Ketchel and Johnson planned to fight together. Because Ketchel was shorter than Johnson, he wore long coats to conceal the platform shoes he had worn to make him look taller at a publicity event. They set up a script for their fight to stretch it to 20 rounds, as a 20-round fight would guarantee boxing fans would pay to go to local theaters to watch the replay of the fight. After 12 rounds, Ketchel swung a surprise punch that knocked Johnson down. Regaining his feet, Johnson then knocked out Ketchel with a swift combination to Ketchel's head and jaw. Ketchel did not wake up for many minutes and some of his teeth were knocked out by the blow, with a few remaining embedded in Johnson's glove.

== Murder ==
The following year, 1910, Ketchel fought six times (including one exhibition), but his fast living had worn him down. Hoping to regain his strength before a rematch with Jack Johnson, Ketchel moved to the ranch of his friend R. P. Dickerson, on what is now referred to as Dickerson Ranch Road, near Conway, Missouri. Dickerson had just hired a cook, Goldie Smith, and a ranch hand, who Smith said was her husband, Walter Kurtz. Walter Kurtz turned out to be Walter Dipley. Walter Dipley and Goldie Smith were not married, and in fact, had just met each other a month before Dickerson had hired them.

After being upbraided by Ketchel for beating a horse on the morning of October 14, Dipley decided to get even by robbing him. The following morning, Smith seated Ketchel at the breakfast table with his back to the door and Dipley, armed with a .22 caliber rifle, came up behind him and shouted, "Get your hands up!" Ketchel stood up, and as he turned around, Dipley shot him. The bullet traveled from his shoulder into his lung and Ketchel fell to the floor mortally wounded. Dipley then took Ketchel's handgun and smashed Ketchel in the face with it. At the same time, Smith rifled Ketchel's pockets for his money. After promising to meet Goldie Smith later that night, Dipley ran from the ranch.

As he lay dying, Ketchel told the former ranch foreman, C. E. Bailey, that Goldie Smith had robbed him, she told police officers that Ketchel had raped her and that that was the reason why Dipley had shot him. Her story fell apart and she admitted her complicity in the robbery, but stated she did not know Dipley was going to kill the reigning champion.

In an effort to save the young fighter's life, R. P. Dickerson chartered a special train to take Stanley Ketchel to a hospital in Springfield, Missouri, but Ketchel died around 7 o'clock that night. His last words were: "I'm so tired. Take me home to mother."

Dickerson also offered a $5,000 dead or alive reward (preferably dead) for Dipley, who was captured at a neighboring farmhouse the next day. Upon being informed of Ketchel's death, his manager Wilson Mizner reportedly said, "Tell them to start counting ten over him. He'll get up."

=== Aftermath ===
Both Walter Dipley and Goldie Smith were convicted of murder and robbery at a jury trial in January 1911, and were given life sentences. Smith had her murder conviction overturned and she served 17 months for the robbery. Walter Dipley served 23 years before he was paroled. He died in 1956, 22 years after his release from prison.

== Legacy ==
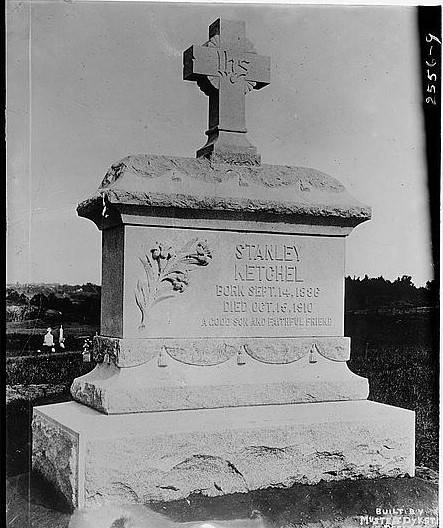
Ketchel's gravestone, Holy Cross Cemetery, Grand Rapids, Michigan

Ketchel was buried at Holy Cross Cemetery at Grand Rapids, Michigan. His funeral was the best-attended burial ceremony in that state until the Ford family surpassed him during the 20th century. A plaque in his honor is at the corner of Stocking Avenue and 3rd Street, and a statue is at 438 Bridge Street Northwest. The Ketchel Valley neighborhood on Grand Rapids' west side is named in Ketchel's honor.

Ketchel is now enshrined in the International Boxing Hall Of Fame.

The Ring in 2004 ranked Ketchel as the eighth-greatest middleweight of all time, behind Harry Greb, Sugar Ray Robinson, Carlos Monzon, Marvin Hagler, Jake LaMotta, Charley Burley, and Tiger Flowers. The Ring also named Ketchel number six on their list of 100 Best Punchers of All Time.

Nat Fleischer, the late ring historian and founding editor of The Ring, considered Stanley to be the greatest middleweight in history.

He had a record of 51 wins, four losses, four draws, one no contest, and four no decisions (newspaper decisions: 2-1-1), with 48 wins by knockout. He was the first middleweight champion to regain the world title after losing it.

== Professional boxing record ==
All information in this section is derived from BoxRec, unless otherwise stated.

=== Official record ===
62 fights	49 wins	5 losses
By knockout	46	3
By decision	3	2
Draws	3	
No contests	1	
Newspaper decisions/draws	4	

All newspaper decisions are officially regarded as “no decision” bouts and are not counted as a win, loss or draw.

No.	Result	Record	Opponent	Type	Round, time	Date	Location	Notes
62	Win	49–5–3 (5)	Jim Smith	KO	5 (10)	Jun 10, 1910	National S.C., New York City, New York, U.S.	
61	Win	48–5–3 (5)	Willie Lewis	KO	2 (10)	May 27, 1910	National S.C., New York City, New York, U.S.	
60	Win	47–5–3 (5)	Porky Flynn	KO	3 (12)	May 17, 1910	Armory A.A., Boston, Massachusetts, U.S.	
59	Loss	46–5–3 (5)	Sam Langford	NWS	6	Apr 27, 1910	National A.C., Philadelphia, Pennsylvania, U.S.	Newspaper Decision
58	Loss	46–5–3 (4)	Frank Klaus	NWS	6	Mar 23, 1910	Duquesne Garden, Pittsburgh, Pennsylvania, U.S.	
57	Loss	46–5–3 (3)	Jack Johnson	KO	12 (20)	Oct 16, 1909	Mission Street Arena, Colma, California, U.S.	For world heavyweight title
56	Win	46–4–3 (3)	Billy Papke	UD	20	Jul 5, 1909	Mission Street Arena, Colma, California, U.S.	Retained world middleweight title
55	Win	45–4–3 (3)	Philadelphia Jack O'Brien	TKO	3 (6)	Jun 9, 1909	National A.C., Philadelphia, Pennsylvania, U.S.	
54	Win	44–4–3 (3)	Tony Caponi	KO	4 (10)	Jun 2, 1909	American A.C., Schenectady, New York, U.S.	
53	Win	43–4–3 (3)	Hugh McGann	NWS	6	May 18, 1909	Duquesne Garden, Pittsburgh, Pennsylvania, U.S.	
52	Win	43–4–3 (2)	Philadelphia Jack O'Brien	NWS	10	Mar 26, 1909	National A.C., New York City, New York, U.S.	
51	Win	43–4–3 (1)	Billy Papke	KO	11 (20)	Nov 26, 1908	Mission Street Arena, Colma, California, U.S.	Won world middleweight title
50	Loss	42–4–3 (1)	Billy Papke	TKO	12 (25)	Sep 7, 1908	Jeffries' Arena, CoVernonlma, California, U.S.	Lost world middleweight title
49	Win	42–3–3 (1)	Joe Thomas	TKO	2 (20)	Aug 18, 1908	San Francisco Coliseum, San Francisco, California, U.S.	
48	Win	41–3–3 (1)	Hugo Kelly	KO	3 (20)	Jul 31, 1908	San Francisco Coliseum, San Francisco, California, U.S.	Retained world middleweight title
47	Win	40–3–3 (1)	Billy Papke	PTS	10	Jun 4, 1908	Hippodrome, Milwaukee, Wisconsin, U.S.	Retained world middleweight title claim; Won Papke's world middleweight title claim
46	Win	39–3–3 (1)	Jack Twin Sullivan	KO	20 (35)	May 9, 1908	Mission Street Arena, Colma, California, U.S.	Retained world middleweight title claim
45	Win	38–3–3 (1)	Mike Twin Sullivan	KO	1 (25)	Feb 22, 1908	Mission Street Arena, Colma, California, U.S.	Retained world middleweight title claim
44	Win	37–3–3 (1)	Joe Thomas	PTS	20	Dec 12, 1907	Recreation Park, San Francisco, California, U.S.	Claimed vacant world middleweight title
43	Win	36–3–3 (1)	Joe Thomas	KO	32 (45)	Sep 2, 1907	Mission Street Arena, Colma, California, U.S.	
42	Draw	35–3–3 (1)	Joe Thomas	PTS	20	Jul 4, 1907	Marysville, California, U.S.	
41	Win	35–3–2 (1)	George Brown	KO	2 (20)	May 23, 1907	Sacramento, California, U.S.	
40	Win	34–3–2 (1)	Benny Hart	KO	8 (?)	May 3, 1907	Marysville, California, U.S.	
39	Win	33–3–2 (1)	Mike McClure	KO	7 (?)	Mar 23, 1907	Redding, California, U.S.	
38	Win	32–3–2 (1)	Kid Foley	KO	11 (?)	Sep 10, 1906	Miles City, Montana, U.S.	
37	Win	31–3–2 (1)	Mike Tierney	KO	7 (?)	May 18, 1906	Butte, Montana, U.S.	
36	Win	30–3–2 (1)	Paddy Hall	KO	1 (?)	May 11, 1906	Gregson Hot Springs, Montana, U.S.	
35	NC	29–3–2 (1)	Warren Zurbrick	ND	2 (20)	Mar 19, 1906	Grand Opera House, Great Falls, Montana, U.S.	
34	Draw	29–3–2	Montana Jack Sullivan	PTS	20	Feb 12, 1906	Butte, Montana, U.S.	
33	Win	29–3–1	Kid Foley	KO	4 (?)	Dec 24, 1905	Butte, Montana, U.S.	
32	Win	28–3–1	Jerry McCarthy	KO	11 (?)	Dec 19, 1905	Great Falls, Montana, U.S.	
31	Win	27–3–1	Jack Bennett	KO	5 (?)	Dec 16, 1905	Butte, Montana, U.S.	
30	Win	26–3–1	Marysville Kid	KO	3 (?)	Dec 2, 1905	Butte, Montana, U.S.	
29	Win	25–3–1	Jerry McCarthy	TKO	12 (20)	Dec 1, 1905	Great Falls, Montana, U.S.	
28	Win	24–3–1	Bob Senate	KO	11 (?)	Sep 14, 1905	Miles City, Montana, U.S.	
27	Win	23–3–1	Kid Fredericks	KO	11 (20)	Aug 29, 1905	Miles City, Montana, U.S.	
26	Win	22–3–1	Roy Hart	KO	1 (?)	Jul 19, 1905	Opera House, Miles City, Montana, U.S.	
25	Win	21–3–1	Bob Senate	KO	17 (?)	Jul 15, 1905	Miles City, Montana, U.S.	
24	Win	20–3–1	Jimmy Kelly	KO	8 (?)	Jul 4, 1905	Miles City, Montana, U.S.	
23	Win	19–3–1	Kid Lee	TKO	17 (20)	Jun 16, 1905	Helena, Montana, U.S.	
22	Win	18–3–1	Kid Pecor	KO	5 (?)	Jun 13, 1905	Butte, Montana, U.S.	
21	Win	17–3–1	Curley Rhue	KO	12 (?)	Jun 4, 1905	Gregson Springs, Montana, U.S.	
20	Win	16–3–1	Sid LaFontise	KO	7 (?)	May 18, 1905	Butte, Montana, U.S.	
19	Draw	15–3–1	Rudolph Hinz	PTS	20	Apr 19, 1905	Miles City, Montana, U.S.	
18	Win	15–3	Sid LaFontise	KO	24 (20)	Mar 25, 1905	Butte, Montana, U.S.	
17	Win	14–3	Jack Bennett	KO	5 (20)	Jan 20, 1905	Butte, Montana, U.S.	
16	Win	13–3	Kid Thomas	KO	1 (10)	Jan 4, 1905	Butte, Montana, U.S.	
15	Win	12–3	Kid Foley	KO	7 (20)	Dec 23, 1904	Casino Theater, Butte, Montana, U.S.	
14	Win	11–3	Jack Grimes	TKO	10 (20)	Dec 16, 1904	Union Hall, Butte, Montana, U.S.	
13	Win	10–3	Kid Herrick	KO	7 (?)	Dec 8, 1904	Butte, Montana, U.S.	
12	Win	9–3	Joe Mudro	KO	4 (?)	Nov 10, 1904	Butte, Montana, U.S.	
11	Loss	8–3	Kid Lee	TKO	8 (?)	Nov 8, 1904	Lewistown, Montana, U.S.	
10	Win	8–2	Jimmy Kelly	KO	1 (?)	Oct 29, 1904	Miles City, Montana, U.S.	
9	Loss	7–2	Maurice Thompson	PTS	10	Oct 21, 1904	Butte, Montana, U.S.	
8	Win	7–1	Bob Merrywell	KO	3 (?)	Oct 15, 1904	Butte, Montana, U.S.	
7	Win	6–1	Jimmy Murray	KO	3 (?)	Sep 15, 1904	Butte, Montana, U.S.	
6	Win	5–1	Johnny Gilsey	KO	4 (?)	Jul 17, 1904	Butte, Montana, U.S.	
5	Win	4–1	Kid Leroy	KO	1 (?)	Jul 15, 1904	Butte, Montana, U.S.	
4	Win	3–1	Jim Kid McGuire	KO	1 (?)	Jul 7, 1904	Butte, Montana, U.S.	
3	Win	2–1	Jimmy Quinn	KO	3 (?)	Jun 20, 1904	Butte, Montana, U.S.	
2	Loss	1–1	Maurice Thompson	PTS	6	May 11, 1903	Broadway Theater, Butte, Montana, U.S.	
1	Win	1–0	Kid Tracy	KO	1 (?)	May 2, 1903	Butte, Montana, U.S.	

=== Unofficial record ===
62 fights	51 wins	7 losses
By knockout	46	3
By decision	5	4
Draws	3	
No contests	1	

Record with the inclusion of newspaper decisions to the win/loss/draw column.

No.	Result	Record	Opponent	Type	Round, time	Date	Location	Notes
62	Win	51–7–3 (1)	Jim Smith	KO	5 (10)	Jun 10, 1910	National S.C., New York City, New York, U.S.	
61	Win	50–7–3 (1)	Willie Lewis	KO	2 (10)	May 27, 1910	National S.C., New York City, New York, U.S.	
60	Win	49–7–3 (1)	Porky Flynn	KO	3 (12)	May 17, 1910	Armory A.A., Boston, Massachusetts, U.S.	
59	Loss	48–7–3 (1)	Sam Langford	NWS	6	Apr 27, 1910	National A.C., Philadelphia, Pennsylvania, U.S.	Newspaper Decision
58	Loss	48–6–3 (1)	Frank Klaus	NWS	6	Mar 23, 1910	Duquesne Garden, Pittsburgh, Pennsylvania, U.S.	
57	Loss	48–5–3 (1)	Jack Johnson	KO	12 (20)	Oct 16, 1909	Mission Street Arena, Colma, California, U.S.	For world heavyweight title
56	Win	48–4–3 (1)	Billy Papke	UD	20	Jul 5, 1909	Mission Street Arena, Colma, California, U.S.	Retained world middleweight title
55	Win	47–4–3 (1)	Philadelphia Jack O'Brien	TKO	3 (6)	Jun 9, 1909	National A.C., Philadelphia, Pennsylvania, U.S.	
54	Win	46–4–3 (1)	Tony Caponi	KO	4 (10)	Jun 2, 1909	American A.C., Schenectady, New York, U.S.	
53	Win	45–4–3 (1)	Hugh McGann	NWS	6	May 18, 1909	Duquesne Garden, Pittsburgh, Pennsylvania, U.S.	
52	Win	44–4–3 (1)	Philadelphia Jack O'Brien	NWS	10	Mar 26, 1909	National A.C., New York City, New York, U.S.	
51	Win	43–4–3 (1)	Billy Papke	KO	11 (20)	Nov 26, 1908	Mission Street Arena, Colma, California, U.S.	Won world middleweight title
50	Loss	42–4–3 (1)	Billy Papke	TKO	12 (25)	Sep 7, 1908	Jeffries' Arena, CoVernonlma, California, U.S.	Lost world middleweight title
49	Win	42–3–3 (1)	Joe Thomas	TKO	2 (20)	Aug 18, 1908	San Francisco Coliseum, San Francisco, California, U.S.	
48	Win	41–3–3 (1)	Hugo Kelly	KO	3 (20)	Jul 31, 1908	San Francisco Coliseum, San Francisco, California, U.S.	Retained world middleweight title
47	Win	40–3–3 (1)	Billy Papke	PTS	10	Jun 4, 1908	Hippodrome, Milwaukee, Wisconsin, U.S.	Retained world middleweight title claim; Won Papke's world middleweight title claim
46	Win	39–3–3 (1)	Jack Twin Sullivan	KO	20 (35)	May 9, 1908	Mission Street Arena, Colma, California, U.S.	Retained world middleweight title claim
45	Win	38–3–3 (1)	Mike Twin Sullivan	KO	1 (25)	Feb 22, 1908	Mission Street Arena, Colma, California, U.S.	Retained world middleweight title claim
44	Win	37–3–3 (1)	Joe Thomas	PTS	20	Dec 12, 1907	Recreation Park, San Francisco, California, U.S.	Claimed vacant world middleweight title
43	Win	36–3–3 (1)	Joe Thomas	KO	32 (45)	Sep 2, 1907	Mission Street Arena, Colma, California, U.S.	
42	Draw	35–3–3 (1)	Joe Thomas	PTS	20	Jul 4, 1907	Marysville, California, U.S.	
41	Win	35–3–2 (1)	George Brown	KO	2 (20)	May 23, 1907	Sacramento, California, U.S.	
40	Win	34–3–2 (1)	Benny Hart	KO	8 (?)	May 3, 1907	Marysville, California, U.S.	
39	Win	33–3–2 (1)	Mike McClure	KO	7 (?)	Mar 23, 1907	Redding, California, U.S.	
38	Win	32–3–2 (1)	Kid Foley	KO	11 (?)	Sep 10, 1906	Miles City, Montana, U.S.	
37	Win	31–3–2 (1)	Mike Tierney	KO	7 (?)	May 18, 1906	Butte, Montana, U.S.	
36	Win	30–3–2 (1)	Paddy Hall	KO	1 (?)	May 11, 1906	Gregson Hot Springs, Montana, U.S.	
35	NC	29–3–2 (1)	Warren Zurbrick	ND	2 (20)	Mar 19, 1906	Grand Opera House, Great Falls, Montana, U.S.	
34	Draw	29–3–2	Montana Jack Sullivan	PTS	20	Feb 12, 1906	Butte, Montana, U.S.	
33	Win	29–3–1	Kid Foley	KO	4 (?)	Dec 24, 1905	Butte, Montana, U.S.	
32	Win	28–3–1	Jerry McCarthy	KO	11 (?)	Dec 19, 1905	Great Falls, Montana, U.S.	
31	Win	27–3–1	Jack Bennett	KO	5 (?)	Dec 16, 1905	Butte, Montana, U.S.	
30	Win	26–3–1	Marysville Kid	KO	3 (?)	Dec 2, 1905	Butte, Montana, U.S.	
29	Win	25–3–1	Jerry McCarthy	TKO	12 (20)	Dec 1, 1905	Great Falls, Montana, U.S.	
28	Win	24–3–1	Bob Senate	KO	11 (?)	Sep 14, 1905	Miles City, Montana, U.S.	
27	Win	23–3–1	Kid Fredericks	KO	11 (20)	Aug 29, 1905	Miles City, Montana, U.S.	
26	Win	22–3–1	Roy Hart	KO	1 (?)	Jul 19, 1905	Opera House, Miles City, Montana, U.S.	
25	Win	21–3–1	Bob Senate	KO	17 (?)	Jul 15, 1905	Miles City, Montana, U.S.	
24	Win	20–3–1	Jimmy Kelly	KO	8 (?)	Jul 4, 1905	Miles City, Montana, U.S.	
23	Win	19–3–1	Kid Lee	TKO	17 (20)	Jun 16, 1905	Helena, Montana, U.S.	
22	Win	18–3–1	Kid Pecor	KO	5 (?)	Jun 13, 1905	Butte, Montana, U.S.	
21	Win	17–3–1	Curley Rhue	KO	12 (?)	Jun 4, 1905	Gregson Springs, Montana, U.S.	
20	Win	16–3–1	Sid LaFontise	KO	7 (?)	May 18, 1905	Butte, Montana, U.S.	
19	Draw	15–3–1	Rudolph Hinz	PTS	20	Apr 19, 1905	Miles City, Montana, U.S.	
18	Win	15–3	Sid LaFontise	KO	24 (20)	Mar 25, 1905	Butte, Montana, U.S.	
17	Win	14–3	Jack Bennett	KO	5 (20)	Jan 20, 1905	Butte, Montana, U.S.	
16	Win	13–3	Kid Thomas	KO	1 (10)	Jan 4, 1905	Butte, Montana, U.S.	
15	Win	12–3	Kid Foley	KO	7 (20)	Dec 23, 1904	Casino Theater, Butte, Montana, U.S.	
14	Win	11–3	Jack Grimes	TKO	10 (20)	Dec 16, 1904	Union Hall, Butte, Montana, U.S.	
13	Win	10–3	Kid Herrick	KO	7 (?)	Dec 8, 1904	Butte, Montana, U.S.	
12	Win	9–3	Joe Mudro	KO	4 (?)	Nov 10, 1904	Butte, Montana, U.S.	
11	Loss	8–3	Kid Lee	TKO	8 (?)	Nov 8, 1904	Lewistown, Montana, U.S.	
10	Win	8–2	Jimmy Kelly	KO	1 (?)	Oct 29, 1904	Miles City, Montana, U.S.	
9	Loss	7–2	Maurice Thompson	PTS	10	Oct 21, 1904	Butte, Montana, U.S.	
8	Win	7–1	Bob Merrywell	KO	3 (?)	Oct 15, 1904	Butte, Montana, U.S.	
7	Win	6–1	Jimmy Murray	KO	3 (?)	Sep 15, 1904	Butte, Montana, U.S.	
6	Win	5–1	Johnny Gilsey	KO	4 (?)	Jul 17, 1904	Butte, Montana, U.S.	
5	Win	4–1	Kid Leroy	KO	1 (?)	Jul 15, 1904	Butte, Montana, U.S.	
4	Win	3–1	Jim Kid McGuire	KO	1 (?)	Jul 7, 1904	Butte, Montana, U.S.	
3	Win	2–1	Jimmy Quinn	KO	3 (?)	Jun 20, 1904	Butte, Montana, U.S.	
2	Loss	1–1	Maurice Thompson	PTS	6	May 11, 1903	Broadway Theater, Butte, Montana, U.S.	
1	Win	1–0	Kid Tracy	KO	1 (?)	May 2, 1903	Butte, Montana, U.S.	

== Popular culture ==
Subject of The Killings of Stanley Ketchel, a novel by James Carlos Blake

Subject of the short story "The Light of the World," by Ernest Hemingway, a chapter in Hemingway's The Nick Adams Stories

Biography Stanley Ketchel: A Life of Triumph and Prophecy, by Manuel A. Mora

Biography The Michigan Assassin: The Saga of Stanley Ketchel, by Nat Fleischer, RING Editor 1946

Book Crossing the Color Line: Stanley Ketchel's Challenge for Jack Johnson's Heavyweight Crown, by Vernon Gravely

Achievements
Vacant Title last held by Tommy Ryan	World Middleweight Champion; February 22, 1908 – September 7, 1908	Succeeded by Billy Papke
Preceded by Billy Papke	World Middleweight Champion; November 26, 1908 – October 15, 1910; Died	Succeeded by Frank Klaus
Status
Preceded by Joe Gans	Latest Born World Champion to Die; October 15, 1910 – 6 July 1916	Succeeded by Tom McCormick
Records
Preceded by Paddy Duffy	Shortest Living World Champion; October 15, 1910 – July 14, 1925	Succeeded by Francisco Guilledo
