= Thomson Burtis =

American writer

Henry Thomson Burtis (1896–1971) was an American writer born in New York.

After serving as a lieutenant in US Army Air Service and as a member of the aerial border patrol, Burtis worked as a newspaper reporter before becoming a writer. He wrote more than two hundred stories for pulp magazines such as Adventure as well as over 20 novels, most of which had an aviation theme and were written for children. Many of his stories appeared in The American Boy, and In Old Oklahoma was one of several films that were adapted from his short stories.

Thomson Burtis died in Santa Monica, California, on April 24, 1971.

== Bibliography ==
=== Russ Farrell series ===
- Russ Farrell, Airman
- Russ Farrell, Border Patrolman
- Russ Farrell, Test Pilot (1925)
- Russ Farrell, Circus Flyer
- Russ Farrell, Over Mexico

=== Rex Lee series ===
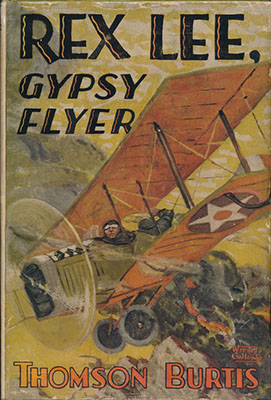

- Rex Lee, Gypsy Flyer
- Rex Lee, On the Border Patrol (1928)
- Rex Lee, Ranger of the Sky (1928)
- Rex Lee, Sky Trailer (1929)
- Rex Lee, Ace of the Airmail
- Rex Lee, Night Flyer (1929)
- Rex Lee's Mysterious Flight (1930)
- Rex Lee, Rough Rider of the Air
- Rex Lee, Aerial Acrobat
- Rex Lee, Trialing Air Bandits (1931)

=== Air Combat Stories for Boys series ===
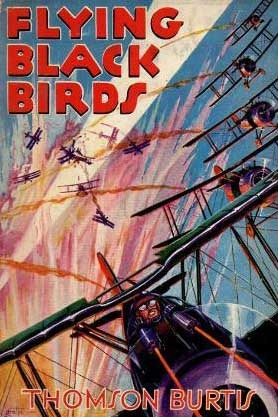

- Daredevils of the Air (1932)
- Four Aces (1932)
- Wing for Wing (1932)
- Flying Blackbirds

=== Individual novels ===
- Haunted Airways
- Straight Shooting
- Flying Blood
- New Guinea Gold (adapted into the movie Crosswinds (film))

=== Other works ===
- Sisters of the Chorus (play)
- Direct methods (1922)
- The sky sheriff (1923)
- Moonlight and moonshine (1924)
- Marston and me (1925)
- The Kink (1927)
- Salute (1927)
- When the squadron dropped anchor (1927)
- Medium boiled (1927)
