= Les Darcy =

Australian boxer (1895–1917)

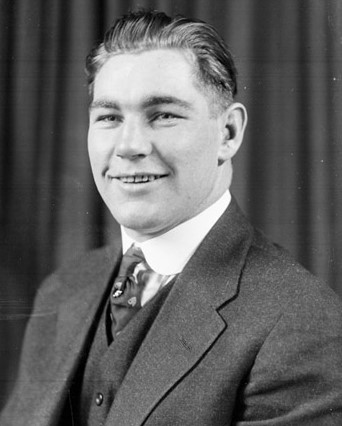

Personal information
- Nickname: The Maitland Wonder Bub
- Nationality: Australian
- Born: James Leslie Darcy; 28 October 1895 Stradbroke, near Woodville, New South Wales, Australia
- Died: 24 May 1917 (aged 21) Memphis, Tennessee, United States
- Height: 5 ft 6 in (1.68 m)
- Weight: Middleweight

Boxing career
- Reach: 71 in (180 cm)
- Stance: Orthodox

Boxing record
- Total fights: 56
- Wins: 52
- Win by KO: 32
- Losses: 4

James Leslie Darcy (28 October 1895 – 24 May 1917) was an Australian boxer. He was a middleweight, but held the Australian Heavyweight Championship title at the same time.

Les Darcy was the 2003 Inductee for the Australian National Boxing Hall of Fame Old Timers category and was the first to be elevated to Legend status in 2009.

== History ==
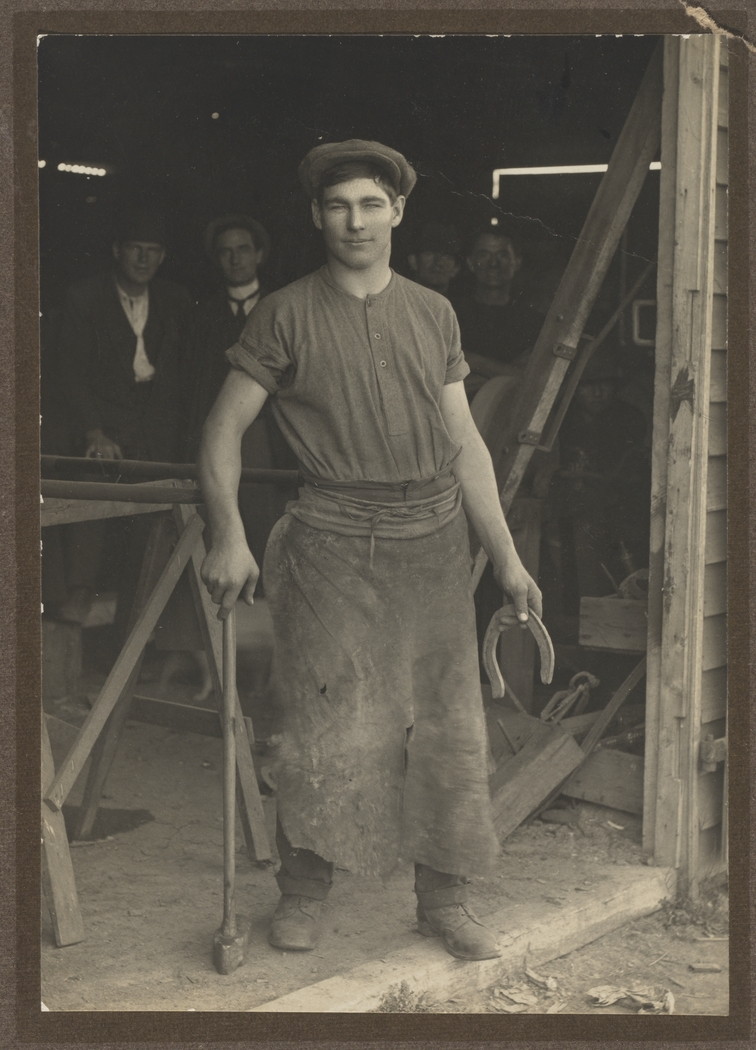
Les Darcy in the door of a blacksmith shop door", East Maitland, ca. 1910.

Les Darcy was born near Maitland, New South Wales. He started boxing as an amateur at age fifteen and quickly turned professional. He won his first sixteen fights before challenging the veteran Bob Whitelaw for the Australian welterweight title. Darcy lost the twenty-round decision but, in a rematch, knocked Whitelaw out in five rounds.

Darcy graduated from regional bouts to fighting in Sydney Stadium, in Rushcutters Bay, and promoters began to import talent to challenge him. He lost his first two fights in Sydney, one by decision and one by foul, to America's Fritz Holland. The next year Darcy faced another American, Jeff Smith, in what was considered a contest for the Australian world middleweight title. When Darcy complained of a low blow at the end of the fifth round, the referee believed that Darcy did not want to continue and awarded the decision to Smith. In a rematch, Darcy was awarded the victory when Smith punched him in the groin.

As Australian world middleweight champ, Darcy defeated such top-flight visiting Americans as Eddie McGoorty, Billy Murray, Jimmy Clabby, George Chip, George "KO" Brown, and Buck Crouse, as well as knocking out Smith and Holland in rematches. Darcy's opponents are said to have admired his courage, stamina, and punching power. In 1916, Darcy knocked Harold Hardwick out to capture the Australian heavyweight title.

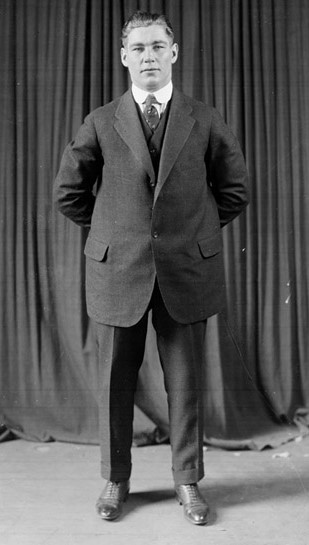
Darcy, ~1917

Darcy became embroiled in the politics of conscription during World War I, and left Australia for the United States to avoid the aggravation. He died on 24 May 1917 from septicaemia and medical complications, which was speculated to be from dental work he received to replace teeth that had been knocked out during a bout.

After his death, Darcy's embalmed body was returned to Australia, where an estimated half-million people paid their respects. His brother Frank, also a boxer who showed many of the attributes of his brother, including pluck, died on 9 May 1919 from influenza, and was buried in the Catholic Cemetery, East Maitland.

== Legacy ==
- Darcy was inducted into the International Boxing Hall of Fame in 1993, the World Boxing Hall of Fame in October 1998, and the Australian National Boxing Hall of Fame in 2003.
- Darcy was the subject of an episode of the 1950 radio series Famous Sportsmen of the Past
- Darcy was the subject of a 1950 radio feature
- He was the subject of a 1952 episode of the radio show They Were Champions
- His life was dramatised in the 1955 Australian radio serial The Life Story of Les Darcy
- His life was dramatised as an episode of the 1988 Australian television series Mike Willesee's Australians where Darcy was played by Peter Phelps
- In 2001, Raffaele Marcellino's opera The Flight of Les Darcy, with libretto by Robert Jarman, premiered at the "10 Days on the Island" festival in Hobart. The character of Darcy has no singing role but is portrayed by a dancer, and draws on the story that he played the violin to prepare himself for fights.

== Professional boxing record ==
52 Wins (32 knockouts, 19 decisions, 1 disqualification), 4 Losses, 0 Draws
Res.	Record	Opponent	Type	Rd.	Date	Location	Notes
Win	52–4	(United States) George Chip	KO	9 (20)	1916-09-30	(Australia) Sydney Stadium, Rushcutters Bay, New South Wales	For world middleweight title (Australian version)
Win	50–4	(Australia) Dave Smith	TKO	11 (20)	1916-08-16	(Australia) Brisbane Stadium, Brisbane, Queensland	For Australian heavyweight title
Win	49–4	(Australia) Dave Smith	KO	12 (20)	1916-06-24	(Australia) Sydney Stadium, Rushcutters Bay, New South Wales	For Australian heavyweight title
Win	48–4	(United States) Buck Crouse	KO	2 (20)	1916-05-29	(Australia) Sydney Stadium, Rushcutters Bay, New South Wales	
Win	47–4	(Romania) Alex Costica	TKO	4 (20)	1916-05-13	(Australia) Sydney Stadium, Rushcutters Bay, New South Wales	For world middleweight title (Australian version); Fight stopped by police inspector after Costica had been badly beaten
Win	46–4	(United States) George "K.O." Brown	Decision	20 (20)	1916-04-08	(Australia) Sydney Stadium, Rushcutters Bay, New South Wales	
Win	45–4	(Australia) Les O'Donnell	TKO	7 (20)	1916-03-25	(Australia) Sydney Stadium, Rushcutters Bay, New South Wales	For Australian heavyweight title
Win	44–4	(Australia) Harold Hardwick	TKO	7 (20)	1916-02-19	(Australia) Sydney Stadium, Rushcutters Bay, New South Wales	For Australian heavyweight title
Win	43–4	(United States) George "K.O." Brown	Decision	20 (20)	1916-01-15	(Australia) Sydney Stadium, Rushcutters Bay, New South Wales	
Win	42–4	(United States) Eddie McGoorty	TKO	8 (20)	1915-12-27	(Australia) Sydney Stadium, Rushcutters Bay, New South Wales	For world middleweight title (Australian version)
Win	41–4	(United States) Billy Murray	TKO	6 (20)	1915-11-01	(Australia) West Melbourne Stadium, West Melbourne, Victoria	
Win	40–4	(United States) Jimmy Clabby	Decision	20 (20)	1915-10-23	(Australia) Sydney Stadium, Rushcutters Bay, New South Wales	For world middleweight title (Australian version)
Win	39–4	(Wales) Fred Dyer	TKO	6 (20)	1915-10-09	(Australia) Sydney Stadium, Rushcutters Bay, New South Wales	For world middleweight title (Australian version)
Win	38–4	(United States) Billy Murray	Decision	20 (20)	1915-09-04	(Australia) Sydney Stadium, Rushcutters Bay, New South Wales	For world middleweight title (Australian version)
Win	37–4	(United States) Eddie McGoorty	TKO	15 (20)	1915-07-31	(Australia) Sydney Stadium, Rushcutters Bay, New South Wales	For world middleweight title (Australian version)
Win	36–4	(Australia) Mick King	TKO	10 (20)	1915-06-12	(Australia) Sydney Stadium, Rushcutters Bay, New South Wales	For world middleweight title (Australian version)
Win	35–4	(United States) Jeff Smith	DQ	2 (20)	1915-05-22	(Australia) Sydney Stadium, Rushcutters Bay, New South Wales	For world middleweight title (Australian version)
Win	34–4	(United States) Fritz Holland	TKO	13 (20)	1915-05-01	(Australia) West Melbourne Stadium, West Melbourne, Victoria	
Win	33–4	(Belgium) Henri Demlen	TKO	5 (20)	1915-04-03	(Australia) Sydney Stadium, Rushcutters Bay, New South Wales	
Win	32–4	(United States) Fritz Holland	Decision	20 (20)	1915-03-13	(Australia) Sydney Stadium, Rushcutters Bay, New South Wales	
Win	31–4	(United States) Frank Loughrey	Decision	20 (20)	1915-02-27	(Australia) Sydney Stadium, Rushcutters Bay, New South Wales	
Loss	30–4	(United States) Jeff Smith	DQ	5 (20)	1915-01-23	(Australia) Sydney Stadium, Rushcutters Bay, New South Wales	For world middleweight title (Australian version)
Win	30–3	(Wales) Fred Dyer	Decision	20 (20)	1914-12-26	(Australia) Baker's Stadium, Brisbane, Queensland	
Win	29–3	(United States) Gus Christie	Decision	20 (20)	1914-11-07	(Australia) Sydney Stadium, Rushcutters Bay, New South Wales	
Win	28–3	(France) Victor "K.O." Marchand	KO	5 (20)	1914-10-05	(Australia) Sydney Stadium, Rushcutters Bay, New South Wales	
Loss	27–3	(United States) Fritz Holland	DQ	18 (20)	1914-09-12	(Australia) Sydney Stadium, Rushcutters Bay, New South Wales	
Loss	27–2	(United States) Fritz Holland	Decision	20 (20)	1914-07-18	(Australia) Sydney Stadium, Rushcutters Bay, New South Wales	
Win	27–1	(Australia) Billy McNabb	TKO	4 (20)	1914-04-23	(Australia) Andrews Ascot Stadium, West Maitland, New South Wales	
Win	26–1	(Australia) Bob Whitelaw	KO	5 (20)	1914-03-21	(Australia) Andrews Ascot Stadium, West Maitland, New South Wales	
Win	25–1	(Australia) Young Hanley	TKO	5 (20)	1914-01-30	(Australia) Olympia A.C., Newtown, New South Wales	
Win	24–1	(England) Jack Clarke	TKO	9 (20)	1914-01-05	(Australia) Olympia A.C., Newtown, New South Wales	
Loss	23–1	(Australia) Bob Whitelaw	Decision	20 (20)	1913-11-03	(Australia) Victoria Theatre, Newcastle, New South Wales	For Australian welterweight title
Win	23–0	(Australia) Billy McNabb	Decision	20 (20)	1913-10-25	(Australia) Andrews Ascot Stadium, West Maitland, New South Wales	
Win	22–0	(Australia) Joe Shakespeare	TKO	7 (20)	1913-09-27	(Australia) Andrews Ascot Stadium, West Maitland, New South Wales	
Win	21–0	(Australia) Reg Regio Delaney	TKO	8 (20)	1913-07-19	(Australia) Andrews Ascot Stadium, West Maitland, New South Wales	
Win	20–0	(Australia) Billy Hannan	TKO	18 (20)	1913-03-15	(Australia) Andrews Ascot Stadium, West Maitland, New South Wales	Police intervened
Win	19–0	(Australia) Jim Burns	KO	11 (20)	1912-12-14	(Australia) Adelphi Hall, West Maitland, New South Wales	
Win	18–0	(United States) Dave Depena	TKO	9 (20)	1912-11-04	(Australia) Summer Park, Newcastle, New South Wales	
Win	17–0	(Australia) Peter Barnes	TKO	9 (10)	1912-09-28	(Australia) Summer Park, Newcastle, New South Wales	Final, 10-stone competition
Win	16–0	(Australia) Peter Devon	TKO	6 (8)	1912-09-21	(Australia) Summer Park, Newcastle, New South Wales	Semi-final, 10-stone competition
Win	15–0	(Australia) Harry Richards	Decision	8 (8)	1912-09-14	(Australia) Summer Park, Newcastle, New South Wales	
Win	14–0	(Australia) Jim Burns	Decision	6 (6)	1912-08-24	(Australia) Summer Park, Newcastle, New South Wales	
Win	13–0	(Australia) Tom Page	Decision	10 (10)	1912-05-04	(Australia) Summer Park, Newcastle, New South Wales	Summer Park tournament, 10 stone division, final
Win	12–0	(Australia) Harry Emery	Decision	8 (8)	1912-04-27	(Australia) Summer Park, Newcastle, New South Wales	Summer Park tournament, 10 stone division, semi-final
Win	11–0	(Australia) Tom Rhymer	TKO	6 (8)	1912-04-06	(Australia) Summer Park, Newcastle, New South Wales	Summer Park tournament, 10 stone division, round two
Win	10–0	(Australia) Roger Fairbairn	TKO	4 (6)	1912-03-30	(Australia) Summer Park, Newcastle, New South Wales	Summer Park tournament, 10 stone division, round one
Win	9–0	(Australia) Harry Ford	KO	(11) 10	1912-02	(Australia) Summer Park, Newcastle, New South Wales	
Win	8–0	(Australia) Peter Cook	KO	(10) 10	1912-02	(Australia) Summer Park, Newcastle, New South Wales	
Win	7–0	(Australia) Harry Emery	KO	6 (10)	1912-01-10	(Australia) Summer Park, Newcastle, New South Wales	
Win	6–0	(Australia) Les Althorne	KO	3 (4)	1911-09-12	(Australia) Maitland Showground, Maitland, New South Wales	
Win	5–0	(Australia) Sam Norman	Decision	(4) (4)	1911-09-12	(Australia) Maitland Showground, Maitland, New South Wales	
Win	4–0	(Australia) Sid Pascoe	KO	2 (10)	1911-08-08	(Australia) Andrews Ascot Stadium, West Maitland, New South Wales	
Win	3–0	(Australia) Tom Donohue	Decision	4 (4)	1911-07-26	(Australia) West Maitland Town Hall, West Maitland, New South Wales	
Win	2–0	(Australia) Young Texas	Decision	4 (4)	1911-04-07	(Australia) West Maitland Town Hall, West Maitland, New South Wales	
Win	1–0	(Australia) George 'Governor' Balser	Decision	11 (10)	12-1910	(Australia) Thornton, New South Wales	

== Reference sources ==
Pictures held and digitised as part of the Arnold Thomas boxing collection by the National Library of Australia

- James Lesley Darcy
- James Lesley Darcy
- Les Darcy giving demonstration of punches with his tutor Dave Smith

Titles in pretence
Preceded by Jeff Smith	World Middleweight Champion; 22 May 1915 – 24 May 1917; Died	Vacant Title next held by Randolph Turpin; BBBC recognition
