= 1913 in sports =

1913 in sports describes the year's events in world sport.

== American football ==
College championship

- College football national championship – Harvard Crimson

== Association football ==
England

- The Football League – Sunderland 54 points, Aston Villa 50, The Wednesday 49, Manchester United 46, Blackburn Rovers 45, Manchester City 44
- FA Cup final – Aston Villa 1–0 Sunderland at Crystal Palace, London
- Woolwich Arsenal, which has just been relegated to Division Two, moves across London from Manor Ground, Plumstead to the new Arsenal Stadium at Highbury in Islington. Soon afterwards, the club drops "Woolwich" from its name to be known as Arsenal F.C..

Germany

- National Championship – VfB Leipzig 3–1 Duisburger SpV at München-Sendling

Netherlands

- PSV Eindhoven founded in Eindhoven.

Scotland

- Scottish Football League – Rangers
- Scottish Cup – Falkirk 2–0 Raith Rovers

United States

- United States Soccer Federation is formed.

== Australian rules football ==
VFL Premiership

- Fitzroy wins the 17th VFL Premiership: Fitzroy 7.14 (56) d St Kilda 4.9 (33) at Melbourne Cricket Ground (MCG)

== Bandy ==
International

- Inaugural European Championship is held in Davos, Switzerland, and is won by England

Sweden

- Championship final – IFK Uppsala 2–1 AIK

== Baseball ==
World Series

- 7–11 October — Philadelphia Athletics (AL) defeats New York Giants (NL) to win the 1913 World Series by 4 games to 1. That is three wins in four years for the Athletics under Connie Mack, three losses in three years for the Giants under John McGraw.

Events

- The Brooklyn Dodgers move into their new stadium, Ebbets Field.

== Boxing ==
Events

- 14 May — Jack Johnson is convicted in Chicago of violating the 1910 Mann Act and is subsequently sentenced to a term of imprisonment of one year and one day plus a fine of $1,000. In June, while still free with an appeal pending, Johnson flees the United States and does not return until July 1920. Johnson is the first person to be prosecuted under the Act, which prohibits so-called white slavery including the interstate transport of females for "immoral purposes". Johnson has had affairs with white prostitutes who have travelled with him to other states. In Johnson's case, it is held that the authorities are using the Act's ambiguous language to justify a selective prosecution which amounts to harassment, based on their desire to deprive him of his title for racist reasons. Johnson retains the title for another two years.
- Following victories in France against Georges Carpentier and Billy Papke, German-American boxer Frank Klaus re-establishes the lineage of the World Middleweight Championship, broken since the death of Stanley Ketchel in 1910.
- 11 October — Klaus is himself beaten by George Chip with a 6th-round knockout at Pittsburgh. Chip holds the middleweight title until 1914.

Lineal world champions

- World Heavyweight Championship – Jack Johnson
- World Light Heavyweight Championship – vacant
- World Middleweight Championship – vacant → Frank Klaus → George Chip
- World Welterweight Championship – vacant
- World Lightweight Championship – Willie Ritchie
- World Featherweight Championship – Johnny Kilbane
- World Bantamweight Championship – Johnny Coulon

== Canadian football ==
- Hamilton plays a series of four matches against WCRFU opponents. They defeat them with a combined sore of 96-8
- The Hamilton Alerts are refused re-entry into the ORFU
- Interprovincial Rugby Football Union - Hamilton
- Ontario Rugby Football Union - Toronto Parkdale
- Western Canada Rugby Football Union - Regina
- Intercollegiate Rugby Football Union - McGill
- 5th Grey Cup – Hamilton Tigers defeat Toronto Parkdale 44-2

== Cricket ==
England

- County Championship – Kent
- Minor Counties Championship – Norfolk
- Most runs – Phil Mead 2627 @ 50.51 (HS 171*)
- Most wickets – Major Booth 181 @ 18.46 (BB 8–86)
- Wisden Cricketers of the Year – Major Booth, George Gunn, Bill Hitch, Albert Relf, Lionel Tennyson

Australia

- Sheffield Shield – South Australia
- Most runs – Victor Trumper 843 @ 84.30 (HS 201*)
- Most wickets – Jack Massie 59 @ 18.66 (BB 7–110)

India

- Bombay Quadrangular – Parsees

New Zealand

- Plunket Shield – Canterbury

South Africa

- Currie Cup – Natal

West Indies

- Inter-Colonial Tournament – not contested

== Cycling ==
Tour de France

- Philippe Thys (Belgium) wins the 11th Tour de France

== Figure skating ==
World Figure Skating Championships

- World Men's Champion – Fritz Kachler (Austria)
- World Women's Champion – Opika von Méray Horváth (Hungary)
- World Pairs Champions – Helene Engelmann / Karl Mejstrik (Austria)

== Golf ==
Major tournaments

- British Open – John Henry Taylor
- US Open – Francis Ouimet is the first amateur to win the US Open in a surprise playoff victory over Harry Vardon and Ted Ray

Other tournaments

- British Amateur – Harold Hilton
- US Amateur – Jerome Travers

== Horse racing ==
England

- Grand National – Covertcoat
- 1,000 Guineas Stakes – Jest
- 2,000 Guineas Stakes – Louvois
- The Derby – Aboyeur
- The Oaks – Jest
- St. Leger Stakes – Night Hawk

Australia

- Melbourne Cup – Posinatus

Canada

- King's Plate – Hearts of Oak

Ireland

- Irish Grand National – Little Hack II (second win, having previously won in 1909)
- Irish Derby Stakes – Bachelor's Wedding

USA

- Kentucky Derby – Donerail
- Preakness Stakes – Buskin
- Belmont Stakes – Prince Eugene

== Ice hockey ==
Stanley Cup

- Quebec Bulldogs wins the National Hockey Association (NHA) championship and the Stanley Cup for both the second time and second year in succession. The Bulldogs then defeat the Sydney Minors two games to none in a Stanley Cup challenge series.

Events

- Winnipeg Hockey Club wins the Allan Cup
- Victoria Senators win the Pacific Coast Hockey Association championship before playing an exhibition series with the Bulldogs, which is won by the Aristocrats

== Multi-sport events ==
Far Eastern Championship Games

- First Far Eastern Championship Games held in Manila, Philippines

== Rowing ==
The Boat Race

- 13 March — Oxford wins the 70th Oxford and Cambridge Boat Race

== Rugby league ==
- 1913 New Zealand rugby league tour of Australia

England

- Championship – Huddersfield
- Challenge Cup final – Huddersfield 9–5 Warrington at Headingley Rugby Stadium, Leeds
- Lancashire League Championship – Wigan
- Yorkshire League Championship – Huddersfield
- Lancashire County Cup – Wigan 21–5 Rochdale Hornets
- Yorkshire County Cup – Batley 17–3 Hull F.C.

Australia

- NSW Premiership – Eastern Suburbs (outright winner)

== Rugby union ==
Five Nations Championship

- 31st Five Nations Championship series is won by England who complete the Grand Slam

== Speed skating ==
Speed Skating World Championships

- Men's All-round Champion – Oscar Mathisen (Norway)

== Tennis ==
Australia

- Australian Men's Singles Championship – Ernie Parker (Australia) defeats Harry Parker (Australia) 2–6 6–1 6–3 6–2

England

- Wimbledon Men's Singles Championship – Anthony Wilding (New Zealand) defeats Maurice McLoughlin (USA) 8–6 6–3 10–8
- Wimbledon Women's Singles Championship – Dorothea Douglass Lambert Chambers (GB) defeats Winifred Slocock McNair (GB) 6–0 6–4

France

- French Men's Singles Championship – Max Decugis (France) defeats Georges Gault (France): details unknown
- French Women's Singles Championship – Marguerite Broquedis (France) defeats Jeanne Matthey (France)

USA

- American Men's Singles Championship – Maurice McLoughlin (USA) defeats Richard Norris Williams (USA) 6–4 5–7 6–3 6–1
- American Women's Singles Championship – Mary Browne (USA) defeats Dorothy Green (USA) 6–2 7–5

Davis Cup

- 1913 International Lawn Tennis Challenge – United States 3–2 Great Britain at Worple Road (grass) London, United Kingdom
