= Frank Klaus =

American boxer (1887–1948)

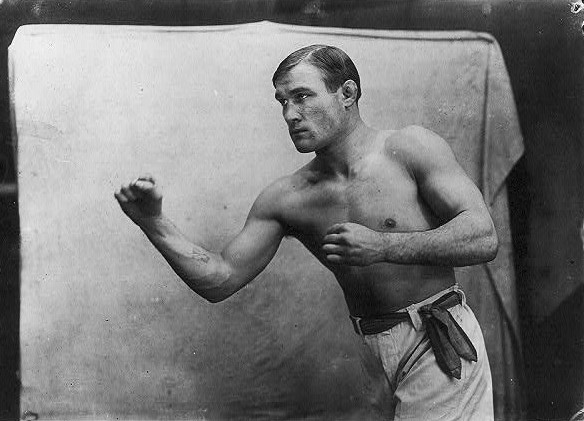

Personal information
- Nickname: The Braddock Bearcat
- Nationality: American
- Born: Francis Klaus; December 30, 1887 Turtle Creek, Pennsylvania
- Died: February 8, 1948 (aged 60) Pittsburgh, Pennsylvania
- Weight: Middleweight

Boxing career

Boxing record
- Total fights: 96
- Wins: 67
- Win by KO: 21
- Losses: 15
- Draws: 14

Francis Klaus (December 30, 1887 – February 8, 1948) was an American boxer from 1904 to 1918. Known as the Braddock Bearcat, Klaus claimed the vacant World Middleweight Championship in 1913 and was elected to the Ring Boxing Hall of Fame in 1974.

Gifted with a strong punch, he lost exceptionally few fights in his nine-year career, and was knocked out only once. Nat Fleischer ranked Klaus sixth as the All-Time Middleweight. His manager was George Engel.

== Early life and career ==
Frank Klaus was born on December 30, 1887, to German-American parents in Turtle Creek, Pennsylvania, near Pittsburgh. He worked as a young man at the Westinghouse Machine Shop, and also mined coal with his father.

He started boxing training early and after winning an amateur tournament at East Pittsburgh's Wilmerding Athletic Club was recognized to have boxing promise by local boxing mentor George Engel. He began his amateur career as early as 1904, and in February 1905 had three round wins on points in Pittsburgh against Frank Walton, and James Harris.

On October 18, 1911, Klaus defeated the great contender Leo Houck in a newspaper win by both the Philadelphia Item and the Philadelphia Record. During his career, the Pennsylvania-born middleweight fought some of the greatest welter, middle, and light heavyweights of his era, including Jack Dillon, Battling Levinsky, Mike Gibbons, Harry Greb, and Al McCoy.

== Claiming and defending the World Middleweight Title ==
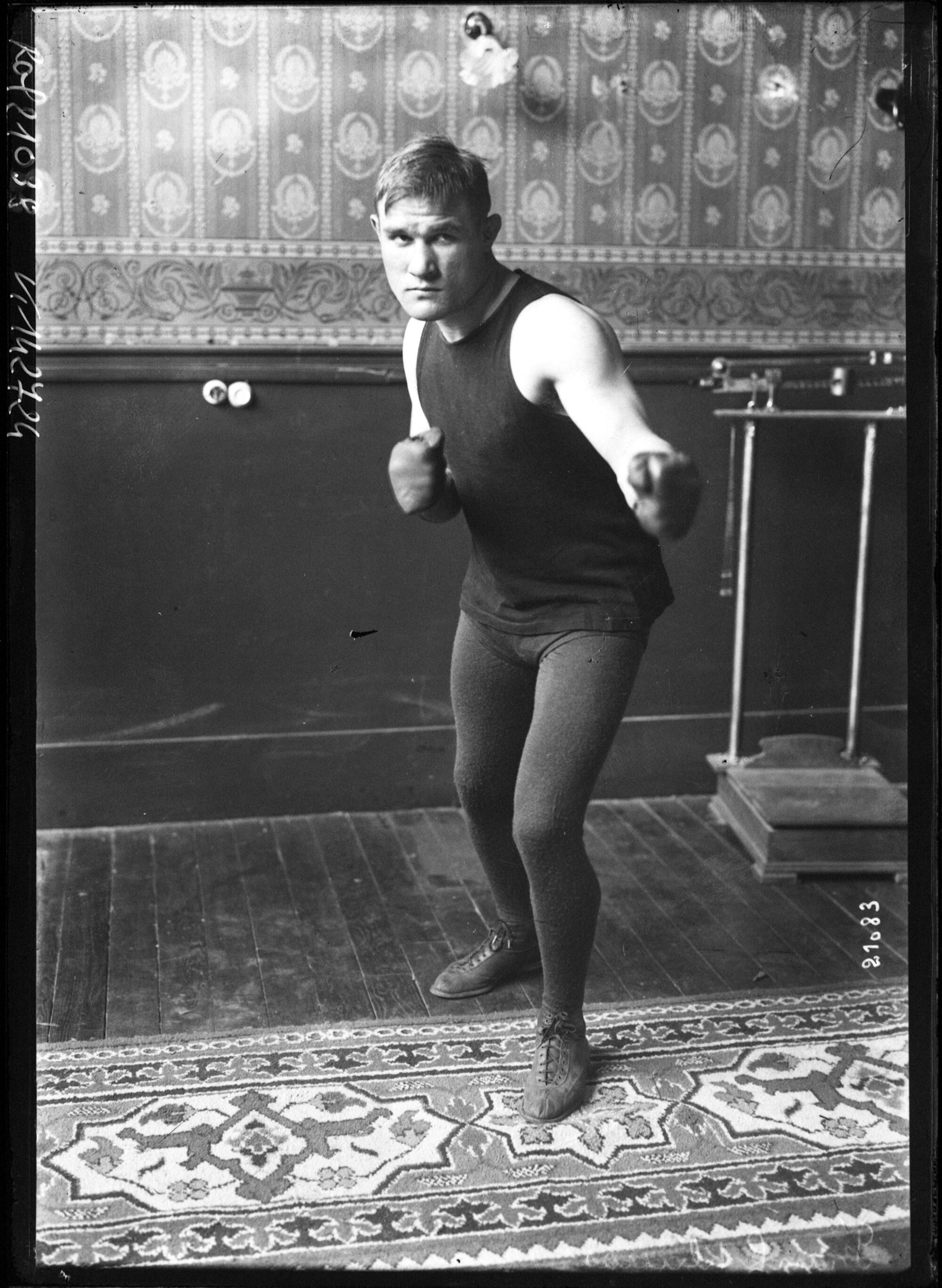
Klaus in boxing pose.

Klaus claimed the World Middleweight Title a few years after it became vacant upon the death of Stanley Ketchel in October 1910. Several contenders competed for the title. Accounts vary as to when Klaus was officially champion, but Klaus himself first claimed the title after defeating Sailor Ed Petrosky in a 20-round points decision in San Francisco on February 22, 1912. His victories over Jack Dillon, and later fellow claimant Georges Carpentier and former champion Billy Papke in France, cemented his claim to the title. He was officially recognized as champion by sanctioning bodies on March 5, 1913.

In his historic title bout against Georges Carpentier on June 24, 1912, in Dieppe, France, Klaus won on a nineteenth round disqualification when Carpentier's manager entered the ring to protest his boxer being elbowed repeatedly by Klaus. Carpentier's manager tried to pull his fighter from the ring by his waist, but the boxer's second had already thrown in the towel.

On September 9, 1912, Klaus defeated Marcel Moreau in Savoie, France as the result of a low blow foul in the fourth of fifteen rounds. Moureau had held the French Middleweight Title in May 1908.

=== Defeating Billy Papke for the Middleweight Title ===
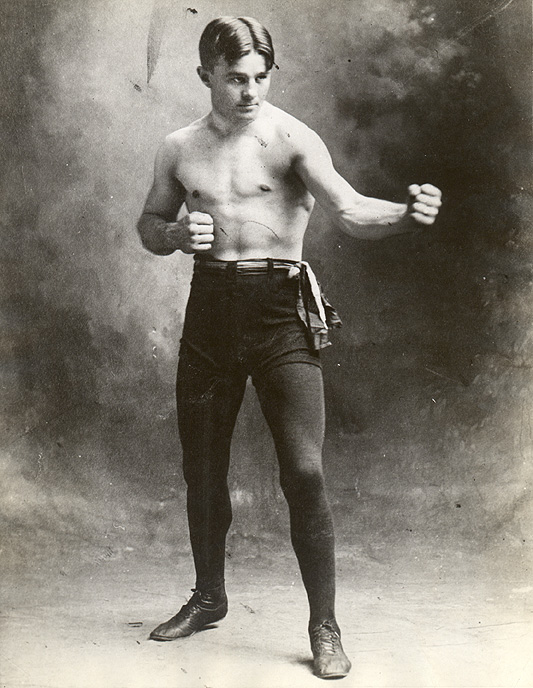
Billy Papke, World Middleweight Champion

In a title fight that led to world title recognition, Klaus defeated American Billy Papke at the Cirque du Paris on March 5, 1913, in a fifteenth-round disqualification. The referee stopped the fight in the fifteenth as a result of Papke continually ignoring his requests to fight cleanly. Klaus was winning by a significant margin. Papke had been warned throughout the fight for flagrant violations of boxing rules. Klaus received a gold belt for the victory.

In another important win that cemented his claim to the title, Klaus defeated contender Eddie McGoorty on May 24, 1913, in a six-round bout in Pittsburgh. The Pittsburgh Gazette gave Klaus five of the six rounds.

On July 1, 1913, Klaus had an important win where he was awarded a third-round TKO against Jimmy Gardner in Boston. Gardner had contended for the World Welterweight Championship earlier in his career. Gardner put up a great defense until the end of the second round, when Klaus threw some hard punches over the defenses of Gardner. After Klaus continued to connect with hard blows, a second of Gardner's jumped into the ring in the middle of the third round to end the fight. Klaus had faced Gardner on at least three previous occasions.

== Losing the World Middleweight Title to George Chip ==
During a title fight on 11 October 1913, George Chip baffled the crowd when he knocked out Klaus with a strong right hook to the jaw. The knockout came near the end of the sixth and final round. Prior to the knockout, in the first five rounds, Chip never threatened to take the lead. The fight occurred at the old Pittsburgh City Hall at Market Square . It was the first loss by knockout in Klaus's career. The extra weight Klaus was carrying in his midsection led many reporters to believe he had not trained adequately for the bout, and had underestimated the ability of his opponent.

In a return non-title match on December 23, 1913, Chip defeated Klaus again. In the fifth round of six, the referee stopped the fight resulting in a technical knockout after Chip knocked Klaus to the mat for a second time. In what most considered a decisive win, the Scranton Truth wrote that Chip was the master of Klaus in every way, and clearly deserved the title he had taken from him two months earlier.

== Retirement from boxing and death ==
Klaus retired from boxing at age 26 shortly after his second loss to George Chip.

Klaus died February 8, 1948, at his home in Pittsburgh, Pennsylvania after a severe heart attack. He was survived by his widow, two sons and three daughters.

== Professional boxing record ==
All information in this section is derived from BoxRec, unless otherwise stated.

=== Official record ===
96 fights	32 wins	6 losses
By knockout	21	3
By decision	6	2
By disqualification	5	1
Draws	2	
Newspaper decisions/draws	56	

All newspaper decisions are officially regarded as “no decision” bouts and are not counted in the win/loss/draw column

No.	Result	Record	Opponent	Type	Round	Date	Location	Notes
96	Loss	32–6–2 (56)	George Chip	TKO	5 (6)	Dec 23, 1913	Duquesne Garden, Pittsburgh, Pennsylvania, U.S.	
95	Loss	32–5–2 (56)	George Chip	TKO	6 (6)	Oct 11, 1913	Old City Hall, Pittsburgh, Pennsylvania, U.S.	Lost NYSAC middleweight title
94	Draw	32–4–2 (56)	Eddie McGoorty	NWS	10	Sep 29, 1913	Southside A.A., Milwaukee, Wisconsin, U.S.	
93	Win	32–4–2 (55)	Jimmy Gardner	TKO	3 (12)	Jul 1, 1913	Atlas A.A., Boston, Massachusetts, U.S.	
92	Loss	31–4–2 (55)	Jack Dillon	NWS	10	May 29, 1913	Washington Park, Indianapolis, Indiana, U.S.	
91	Win	31–4–2 (54)	Eddie McGoorty	NWS	6	May 24, 1913	Exposition Park, Pittsburgh, Pennsylvania, U.S.	
90	Win	31–4–2 (53)	Billy Papke	DQ	15 (20)	Mar 5, 1913	Cirque de Paris, Paris, Paris, France	Retained NYSAC middleweight title; Claimed world middleweight title
89	Win	30–4–2 (53)	Pietro Boine	DQ	3 (?)	Sep 16, 1912	Casino-Kursaal, Lyon, Rhône, France	
88	Win	29–4–2 (53)	Marcel Moreau	DQ	4 (15)	Sep 9, 1912	Villa des Fleurs, Aix-les-Bains, Savoie, France	Moreau was disqualified for hitting low
87	Win	28–4–2 (53)	Georges Carpentier	DQ	19 (20)	Jun 24, 1912	Grand Hall des Magasins Généraux, Dieppe, Seine-Maritime, France	Retained world middleweight title claim; Won world (title claim) and inaugural NYSAC middleweight titles; Carpentier DQ'd when his manager entered the ring after being hit by two elbows
86	Win	27–4–2 (53)	Jack Dillon	NWS	10	May 3, 1912	Madison Square Garden, Manhattan, New York City, New York, U.S.	
85	Win	27–4–2 (52)	Jack Dillon	PTS	20	Mar 23, 1912	Coffroth's Arena, Daly City, California, U.S.	Retained world middleweight title claim; Claimed world middleweight title
84	Win	26–4–2 (52)	Sailor Ed Petroskey	PTS	20	Feb 22, 1912	Auditorium Pavilion, San Francisco, California, U.S.	Claimed vacant middleweight title
83	Win	25–4–2 (52)	George Knockout Brown	NWS	6	Jan 29, 1912	Old City Hall, Pittsburgh, Pennsylvania, U.S.	
82	Win	25–4–2 (51)	Jimmy Howard	NWS	6	Jan 15, 1912	Old City Hall, Pittsburgh, Pennsylvania, U.S.	
81	Draw	25–4–2 (50)	Jack Dillon	NWS	6	Dec 6, 1911	Old City Hall, Pittsburgh, Pennsylvania, U.S.	
80	Win	25–4–2 (49)	Leo Houck	NWS	6	Oct 18, 1911	American A.C., Philadelphia, Pennsylvania, U.S.	
79	Win	25–4–2 (48)	Tommy Sullivan	KO	2 (12)	Oct 12, 1911	Arena (Armory A.A.), Boston, Massachusetts, U.S.	
78	Win	24–4–2 (48)	Cyclone Johnny Thompson	NWS	10	Aug 17, 1911	National A.C., Manhattan, New York City, New York, U.S.	World middleweight title claim at stake; (via KO only)
77	Win	24–4–2 (47)	Vic Hansen	KO	8 (20)	Jul 1, 1911	Coalinga, California, U.S.	
76	Win	23–4–2 (47)	Montana Dan Sullivan	KO	3 (20)	Jun 15, 1911	Piedmont Pavilion, Oakland, California, U.S.	
75	Win	22–4–2 (47)	Bill MacKinnon	NWS	6	May 6, 1911	National A.C., Philadelphia, Pennsylvania, U.S.	
74	Win	22–4–2 (46)	Jimmy Gardner	NWS	6	Apr 11, 1911	Duquesne Garden, Pittsburgh, Pennsylvania, U.S.	
73	Win	22–4–2 (45)	Montana Jack Sullivan	TKO	3 (10)	Mar 28, 1911	Fairmont A.C., Bronx, New York City, New York, U.S.	
72	Win	21–4–2 (45)	Leo Houck	PTS	12	Feb 14, 1911	Armory A.A., Boston, Massachusetts, U.S.	
71	Win	20–4–2 (45)	Willie Lewis	TKO	6 (10)	Feb 7, 1911	Fairmont A.C., Bronx, New York City, New York, U.S.	
70	Draw	19–4–2 (45)	Jimmy Gardner	PTS	12	Jan 31, 1911	Armory A.A., Boston, Massachusetts, U.S.	
69	Win	19–4–1 (45)	Billy Berger	NWS	6	Jan 11, 1911	Old City Hall, Pittsburgh, Pennsylvania, U.S.	
68	Loss	19–4–1 (44)	Hugo Kelly	PTS	12	Dec 20, 1910	Armory, Boston, Massachusetts, U.S.	
67	Win	19–3–1 (44)	Jack Abbott	TKO	5 (6)	Dec 15, 1910	Palisades Rink, McKeesport, Pennsylvania, U.S.	
66	Loss	18–3–1 (44)	Jimmy Gardner	PTS	12	Nov 29, 1910	Armory, Boston, Massachusetts, U.S.	
65	Loss	18–2–1 (44)	Leo Houck	NWS	6	Oct 29, 1910	National A.C., Philadelphia, Pennsylvania, U.S.	
64	Win	18–2–1 (43)	Frank Mantell	NWS	6	Sep 28, 1910	Duquesne Garden, Pittsburgh, Pennsylvania, U.S.	
63	Win	18–2–1 (42)	Jimmy Gardner	PTS	12	Apr 12, 1910	Armory A.A., Boston, Massachusetts, U.S.	
62	Win	17–2–1 (42)	Frank Mantell	KO	9 (12)	Mar 29, 1910	Armory A.A., Boston, Massachusetts, U.S.	
61	Win	16–2–1 (42)	Stanley Ketchel	NWS	6	Mar 23, 1910	Duquesne Garden, Pittsburgh, Pennsylvania, U.S.	
60	Win	16–2–1 (41)	Jack "Twin" Sullivan	PTS	12	Jan 18, 1910	Armory A.A., Boston, Massachusetts, U.S.	
59	Win	15–2–1 (41)	Billy Berger	NWS	6	Jan 7, 1910	Old City Hall, Pittsburgh, Pennsylvania, U.S.	
58	Win	15–2–1 (40)	Porky Dan Flynn	PTS	12	Dec 21, 1909	Armory A.A., Boston, Massachusetts, U.S.	
57	Loss	14–2–1 (40)	Joe Thomas	NWS	6	Dec 18, 1909	National A.C., Philadelphia, Pennsylvania, U.S.	
56	Draw	14–2–1 (39)	Harry Lewis	NWS	6	Nov 27, 1909	National A.C., Philadelphia, Pennsylvania, U.S.	
55	Win	14–2–1 (38)	Billy Papke	NWS	6	Nov 11, 1909	Duquesne Garden, Pittsburgh, Pennsylvania, U.S.	
54	Win	14–2–1 (37)	Jack Rowan	KO	2 (6)	Oct 26, 1909	Old City Hall, Pittsburgh, Pennsylvania, U.S.	
53	Win	13–2–1 (37)	Hugh McGann	DQ	3 (6)	Sep 17, 1909	Duquesne Garden, Pittsburgh, Pennsylvania, U.S.	McGann took a trouncing before he resorted to fouling
52	Loss	12–2–1 (37)	Hugo Kelly	NWS	6	Jun 25, 1909	Bijou Theater, Pittsburgh, Pennsylvania, U.S.	
51	Win	12–2–1 (36)	Jack Fitzgerald	NWS	6	May 31, 1909	West End A.C., Philadelphia, Pennsylvania, U.S.	
50	Win	12–2–1 (35)	Harry Mansfield	TKO	1 (6)	May 15, 1909	National A.C., Philadelphia, Pennsylvania, U.S.	
49	Loss	11–2–1 (35)	Jim Smith	DQ	2 (6)	May 15, 1909	National A.C., Philadelphia, Pennsylvania, U.S.	
48	Win	11–1–1 (35)	Harry Lewis	DQ	6 (6)	Apr 24, 1909	National A.C., Philadelphia, Pennsylvania, U.S.	
47	Win	10–1–1 (35)	Harry Mansfield	NWS	6	Apr 5, 1909	West End A.C., Philadelphia, Pennsylvania, U.S.	
46	Win	10–1–1 (34)	Jack Williams	TKO	2 (6)	Mar 18, 1909	Hiland Theater, Pittsburgh, Pennsylvania, U.S.	
45	Win	9–1–1 (34)	Cy Flynn	TKO	3 (6)	Mar 4, 1909	Hiland Theater, Pittsburgh, Pennsylvania, U.S.	
44	Win	8–1–1 (34)	Harry Mansfield	NWS	6	Feb 18, 1909	Hiland Theater, Pittsburgh, Pennsylvania, U.S.	
43	Win	8–1–1 (33)	Pat Carney	KO	1 (6)	Feb 11, 1909	Hiland Theater, Pittsburgh, Pennsylvania, U.S.	
42	Win	7–1–1 (33)	Jim Donovan	NWS	6	Feb 8, 1909	Turner Hall, Pittsburgh, Pennsylvania, U.S.	
41	Win	7–1–1 (32)	Tommy Crawford	TKO	1 (6)	Jan 15, 1909	Duquesne Garden, Pittsburgh, Pennsylvania, U.S.	
40	Win	6–1–1 (32)	Tommy Lynch	NWS	6	Dec 23, 1908	Turner Hall, Pittsburgh, Pennsylvania, U.S.	
39	Win	6–1–1 (31)	Paul Moore	NWS	6	Dec 22, 1908	Southside Market House, Pittsburgh, Pennsylvania, U.S.	
38	Win	6–1–1 (30)	Billy Clark	KO	2 (6)	Nov 28, 1908	National A.C., Philadelphia, Pennsylvania, U.S.	
37	Win	5–1–1 (30)	Jack Fitzgerald	NWS	6	Nov 16, 1908	West End A.C., Philadelphia, Pennsylvania, U.S.	
36	Win	5–1–1 (29)	Kid Williams	KO	5 (6)	Oct 30, 1908	New Amsterdam Opera House, Manhattan, New York City, New York, U.S.	
35	Win	4–1–1 (29)	Jim Donovan	NWS	6	Oct 24, 1908	Terminal A.C., Brooklyn, New York City, New York, U.S.	
34	Win	4–1–1 (28)	Johnny Carroll	NWS	6	Sep 25, 1908	National S.C., Manhattan, New York City, New York, U.S.	
33	Loss	4–1–1 (27)	Jack Robinson	NWS	6	Sep 16, 1908	Mozart Theater, Binghamton, New York, U.S.	
32	Draw	4–1–1 (26)	Billy Clark	NWS	6	Sep 12, 1908	National A.C., Philadelphia, Pennsylvania, U.S.	
31	Win	4–1–1 (25)	Jack Robinson	NWS	6	Sep 11, 1908	National S.C, Manhattan, New York City, New York, U.S.	
30	Win	4–1–1 (24)	Dutch Zimmer	KO	3 (6)	Sep 8, 1908	Navarre A.C., Manhattan, New York City, New York, U.S.	
29	Win	3–1–1 (24)	Jim Donovan	NWS	6	Aug 26, 1908	Navarre A.C., Manhattan, New York City, New York, U.S.	
28	Win	3–1–1 (23)	Jack Nelson	NWS	6	May 29, 1908	Roman A.C., Manhattan, New York City, New York, U.S.	
27	Win	3–1–1 (22)	Jack Fitzgerald	NWS	6	May 7, 1908	Broadway A.C., Philadelphia, Pennsylvania, U.S.	
26	Win	3–1–1 (21)	Cub White	NWS	6	May 4, 1908	West End A.C., Philadelphia, Pennsylvania, U.S.	
25	Draw	3–1–1 (20)	Billy Clark	NWS	6	Mar 28, 1908	National A.C., Philadelphia, Pennsylvania, U.S.	
24	Win	3–1–1 (19)	Alex Laird	KO	2 (6)	Mar 16, 1908	Latrobe, Pennsylvania, U.S.	
23	Win	2–1–1 (19)	Paul Moore	NWS	6	Dec 10, 1907	Rankin Athletic Club Rooms, Rankin, Pennsylvania, U.S.	
22	Loss	2–1–1 (18)	Dick Given	NWS	6	Oct 28, 1907	Rankin, Pennsylvania, U.S.	
21	Win	2–1–1 (17)	Andy Diamond	KO	1 (6)	Sep 14, 1907	Donora, Pennsylvania, U.S.	
20	Win	1–1–1 (17)	Al Martin	NWS	6	May 28, 1907	Greensburg, Pennsylvania, U.S.	
19	Loss	1–1–1 (16)	Paul Moore	NWS	6	Jan 10, 1907	East Pittsburgh, Pennsylvania, U.S.	
18	Win	1–1–1 (15)	Jock Simcoe	NWS	6	Dec 20, 1906	McKeesport, Pennsylvania, U.S.	
17	Draw	1–1–1 (14)	Paul Moore	NWS	6	Dec 11, 1906	Turner Hall, Pittsburgh, Pennsylvania, U.S.	
16	Win	1–1–1 (13)	James Frazier	NWS	6	Nov 12, 1906	Turner Hall, Pittsburgh, Pennsylvania, U.S.	
15	Win	1–1–1 (12)	Tom Broderick	TKO	3 (6)	Oct 29, 1906	Art Club, Ambridge, Pennsylvania, U.S.	
14	Win	0–1–1 (12)	George Decker	NWS	6	Oct 9, 1906	Mutual Benefit Hall, East Pittsburgh, Pennsylvania, U.S.	
13	Draw	0–1–1 (11)	George Fraser	PTS	32 (?)	Aug 25, 1906	Lorain, Ohio, U.S.	This was to be a fight to the finish and was held in secret to avoid police interference; Referee Dime stopped the bout and called it a draw
12	Draw	0–1 (11)	Jack Bruce	NWS	4	May 8, 1906	Turner Hall, Pittsburgh, Pennsylvania, U.S.	
11	Win	0–1 (10)	Ned Chernoff	NWS	4	Mar 26, 1906	Turner Hall, Pittsburgh, Pennsylvania, U.S.	
10	Draw	0–1 (9)	Mike Ward	NWS	4	Feb 27, 1906	Turner Hall, Pittsburgh, Pennsylvania, U.S.	
9	Win	0–1 (8)	Dick Given	NWS	4	Jan 25, 1906	Turner Hall, East Pittsburgh, Pennsylvania, U.S.	
8	Draw	0–1 (7)	Frank Diamond	NWS	6	Jan 24, 1906	Oakland Armory, Pittsburgh, Pennsylvania, U.S.	
7	Win	0–1 (6)	Jock Simcoe	NWS	6	Dec 14, 1905	East Pittsburgh, Pennsylvania, U.S.	
6	Loss	0–1 (5)	Elmer Morgan	KO	4 (6)	Jul 27, 1905	Mutual Benefit Hall, East Pittsburgh, Pennsylvania, U.S.	
5	Win	0–0 (5)	Battling Simpson	NWS	4	Mar 27, 1905	Wilmerding A.C., Wilmerding, Pennsylvania, U.S.	Listed as on Mar 28, but stated that it happened the previous night
4	Draw	0–0 (4)	John Ulm	NWS	4	Mar 27, 1905	Wilmerding A.C., Wilmerding, Pennsylvania, U.S.	
3	Loss	0–0 (3)	Frank Diamond	NWS	4	Mar 4, 1905	Business Men's Club, Pittsburgh, Pennsylvania, U.S.	
2	Loss	0–0 (2)	Frank Diamond	NWS	4	Feb 25, 1905	Business Men's Club, Pittsburgh, Pennsylvania, U.S.	
1	Draw	0–0 (1)	Patsy Hogan	NWS	4	Feb 18, 1905	Business Men's Club, Pittsburgh, Pennsylvania, U.S.	

=== Unofficial record ===
96 fights	68 wins	15 losses
By knockout	21	3
By decision	42	11
By disqualification	5	1
Draws	13	

Record with the inclusion of newspaper decision in the win/loss/draw column.

No.	Result	Record	Opponent	Type	Round	Date	Location	Notes
96	Loss	68–15–13	George Chip	TKO	5 (6)	Dec 23, 1913	Duquesne Garden, Pittsburgh, Pennsylvania, U.S.	
95	Loss	68–14–13	George Chip	TKO	6 (6)	Oct 11, 1913	Old City Hall, Pittsburgh, Pennsylvania, U.S.	Lost NYSAC middleweight title
94	Draw	68–13–13	Eddie McGoorty	NWS	10	Sep 29, 1913	Southside A.A., Milwaukee, Wisconsin, U.S.	
93	Win	68–13–12	Jimmy Gardner	TKO	3 (12)	Jul 1, 1913	Atlas A.A., Boston, Massachusetts, U.S.	
92	Loss	67–13–12	Jack Dillon	NWS	10	May 29, 1913	Washington Park, Indianapolis, Indiana, U.S.	
91	Win	67–12–12	Eddie McGoorty	NWS	6	May 24, 1913	Exposition Park, Pittsburgh, Pennsylvania, U.S.	
90	Win	66–12–12	Billy Papke	DQ	15 (20)	Mar 5, 1913	Cirque de Paris, Paris, Paris, France	Retained NYSAC middleweight title; Claimed world middleweight title
89	Win	65–12–12	Pietro Boine	DQ	3 (?)	Sep 16, 1912	Casino-Kursaal, Lyon, Rhône, France	
88	Win	64–12–12	Marcel Moreau	DQ	4 (15)	Sep 9, 1912	Villa des Fleurs, Aix-les-Bains, Savoie, France	Moreau was disqualified for hitting low
87	Win	63–12–12	Georges Carpentier	DQ	19 (20)	Jun 24, 1912	Grand Hall des Magasins Généraux, Dieppe, Seine-Maritime, France	Retained world middleweight title claim; Won world (title claim) and inaugural NYSAC middleweight titles; Carpentier DQ'd when his manager entered the ring after being hit by two elbows
86	Win	62–12–12	Jack Dillon	NWS	10	May 3, 1912	Madison Square Garden, Manhattan, New York City, New York, U.S.	
85	Win	61–12–12	Jack Dillon	PTS	20	Mar 23, 1912	Coffroth's Arena, Daly City, California, U.S.	Retained world middleweight title claim; Claimed world middleweight title
84	Win	60–12–12	Sailor Ed Petroskey	PTS	20	Feb 22, 1912	Auditorium Pavilion, San Francisco, California, U.S.	Claimed vacant middleweight title
83	Win	59–12–12	George Knockout Brown	NWS	6	Jan 29, 1912	Old City Hall, Pittsburgh, Pennsylvania, U.S.	
82	Win	58–12–12	Jimmy Howard	NWS	6	Jan 15, 1912	Old City Hall, Pittsburgh, Pennsylvania, U.S.	
81	Draw	57–12–12	Jack Dillon	NWS	6	Dec 6, 1911	Old City Hall, Pittsburgh, Pennsylvania, U.S.	
80	Win	57–12–11	Leo Houck	NWS	6	Oct 18, 1911	American A.C., Philadelphia, Pennsylvania, U.S.	
79	Win	56–12–11	Tommy Sullivan	KO	2 (12)	Oct 12, 1911	Arena (Armory A.A.), Boston, Massachusetts, U.S.	
78	Win	55–12–11	Cyclone Johnny Thompson	NWS	10	Aug 17, 1911	National A.C., Manhattan, New York City, New York, U.S.	World middleweight title claim at stake; (via KO only)
77	Win	54–12–11	Vic Hansen	KO	8 (20)	Jul 1, 1911	Coalinga, California, U.S.	
76	Win	53–12–11	Montana Dan Sullivan	KO	3 (20)	Jun 15, 1911	Piedmont Pavilion, Oakland, California, U.S.	
75	Win	52–12–11	Bill MacKinnon	NWS	6	May 6, 1911	National A.C., Philadelphia, Pennsylvania, U.S.	
74	Win	51–12–11	Jimmy Gardner	NWS	6	Apr 11, 1911	Duquesne Garden, Pittsburgh, Pennsylvania, U.S.	
73	Win	50–12–11	Montana Jack Sullivan	TKO	3 (10)	Mar 28, 1911	Fairmont A.C., Bronx, New York City, New York, U.S.	
72	Win	49–12–11	Leo Houck	PTS	12	Feb 14, 1911	Armory A.A., Boston, Massachusetts, U.S.	
71	Win	48–12–11	Willie Lewis	TKO	6 (10)	Feb 7, 1911	Fairmont A.C., Bronx, New York City, New York, U.S.	
70	Draw	47–12–11	Jimmy Gardner	PTS	12	Jan 31, 1911	Armory A.A., Boston, Massachusetts, U.S.	
69	Win	47–12–10	Billy Berger	NWS	6	Jan 11, 1911	Old City Hall, Pittsburgh, Pennsylvania, U.S.	
68	Loss	46–12–10	Hugo Kelly	PTS	12	Dec 20, 1910	Armory, Boston, Massachusetts, U.S.	
67	Win	46–11–10	Jack Abbott	TKO	5 (6)	Dec 15, 1910	Palisades Rink, McKeesport, Pennsylvania, U.S.	
66	Loss	45–11–10	Jimmy Gardner	PTS	12	Nov 29, 1910	Armory, Boston, Massachusetts, U.S.	
65	Loss	45–10–10	Leo Houck	NWS	6	Oct 29, 1910	National A.C., Philadelphia, Pennsylvania, U.S.	
64	Win	45–9–10	Frank Mantell	NWS	6	Sep 28, 1910	Duquesne Garden, Pittsburgh, Pennsylvania, U.S.	
63	Win	44–9–10	Jimmy Gardner	PTS	12	Apr 12, 1910	Armory A.A., Boston, Massachusetts, U.S.	
62	Win	43–9–10	Frank Mantell	KO	9 (12)	Mar 29, 1910	Armory A.A., Boston, Massachusetts, U.S.	
61	Win	42–9–10	Stanley Ketchel	NWS	6	Mar 23, 1910	Duquesne Garden, Pittsburgh, Pennsylvania, U.S.	
60	Win	41–9–10	Jack "Twin" Sullivan	PTS	12	Jan 18, 1910	Armory A.A., Boston, Massachusetts, U.S.	
59	Win	40–9–10	Billy Berger	NWS	6	Jan 7, 1910	Old City Hall, Pittsburgh, Pennsylvania, U.S.	
58	Win	39–9–10	Porky Dan Flynn	PTS	12	Dec 21, 1909	Armory A.A., Boston, Massachusetts, U.S.	
57	Loss	38–9–10	Joe Thomas	NWS	6	Dec 18, 1909	National A.C., Philadelphia, Pennsylvania, U.S.	
56	Draw	38–8–10	Harry Lewis	NWS	6	Nov 27, 1909	National A.C., Philadelphia, Pennsylvania, U.S.	
55	Win	38–8–9	Billy Papke	NWS	6	Nov 11, 1909	Duquesne Garden, Pittsburgh, Pennsylvania, U.S.	
54	Win	37–8–9	Jack Rowan	KO	2 (6)	Oct 26, 1909	Old City Hall, Pittsburgh, Pennsylvania, U.S.	
53	Win	36–8–9	Hugh McGann	DQ	3 (6)	Sep 17, 1909	Duquesne Garden, Pittsburgh, Pennsylvania, U.S.	McGann took a trouncing before he resorted to fouling
52	Loss	35–8–9	Hugo Kelly	NWS	6	Jun 25, 1909	Bijou Theater, Pittsburgh, Pennsylvania, U.S.	
51	Win	35–7–9	Jack Fitzgerald	NWS	6	May 31, 1909	West End A.C., Philadelphia, Pennsylvania, U.S.	
50	Win	34–7–9	Harry Mansfield	TKO	1 (6)	May 15, 1909	National A.C., Philadelphia, Pennsylvania, U.S.	
49	Loss	33–7–9	Jim Smith	DQ	2 (6)	May 15, 1909	National A.C., Philadelphia, Pennsylvania, U.S.	
48	Win	33–6–9	Harry Lewis	DQ	6 (6)	Apr 24, 1909	National A.C., Philadelphia, Pennsylvania, U.S.	
47	Win	32–6–9	Harry Mansfield	NWS	6	Apr 5, 1909	West End A.C., Philadelphia, Pennsylvania, U.S.	
46	Win	31–6–9	Jack Williams	TKO	2 (6)	Mar 18, 1909	Hiland Theater, Pittsburgh, Pennsylvania, U.S.	
45	Win	30–6–9	Cy Flynn	TKO	3 (6)	Mar 4, 1909	Hiland Theater, Pittsburgh, Pennsylvania, U.S.	
44	Win	29–6–9	Harry Mansfield	NWS	6	Feb 18, 1909	Hiland Theater, Pittsburgh, Pennsylvania, U.S.	
43	Win	28–6–9	Pat Carney	KO	1 (6)	Feb 11, 1909	Hiland Theater, Pittsburgh, Pennsylvania, U.S.	
42	Win	27–6–9	Jim Donovan	NWS	6	Feb 8, 1909	Turner Hall, Pittsburgh, Pennsylvania, U.S.	
41	Win	26–6–9	Tommy Crawford	TKO	1 (6)	Jan 15, 1909	Duquesne Garden, Pittsburgh, Pennsylvania, U.S.	
40	Win	25–6–9	Tommy Lynch	NWS	6	Dec 23, 1908	Turner Hall, Pittsburgh, Pennsylvania, U.S.	
39	Win	24–6–9	Paul Moore	NWS	6	Dec 22, 1908	Southside Market House, Pittsburgh, Pennsylvania, U.S.	
38	Win	23–6–9	Billy Clark	KO	2 (6)	Nov 28, 1908	National A.C., Philadelphia, Pennsylvania, U.S.	
37	Win	22–6–9	Jack Fitzgerald	NWS	6	Nov 16, 1908	West End A.C., Philadelphia, Pennsylvania, U.S.	
36	Win	21–6–9	Kid Williams	KO	5 (6)	Oct 30, 1908	New Amsterdam Opera House, Manhattan, New York City, New York, U.S.	
35	Win	20–6–9	Jim Donovan	NWS	6	Oct 24, 1908	Terminal A.C., Brooklyn, New York City, New York, U.S.	
34	Win	19–6–9	Johnny Carroll	NWS	6	Sep 25, 1908	National S.C., Manhattan, New York City, New York, U.S.	
33	Loss	18–6–9	Jack Robinson	NWS	6	Sep 16, 1908	Mozart Theater, Binghamton, New York, U.S.	
32	Draw	18–5–9	Billy Clark	NWS	6	Sep 12, 1908	National A.C., Philadelphia, Pennsylvania, U.S.	
31	Win	18–5–8	Jack Robinson	NWS	6	Sep 11, 1908	National S.C, Manhattan, New York City, New York, U.S.	
30	Win	17–5–8	Dutch Zimmer	KO	3 (6)	Sep 8, 1908	Navarre A.C., Manhattan, New York City, New York, U.S.	
29	Win	16–5–8	Jim Donovan	NWS	6	Aug 26, 1908	Navarre A.C., Manhattan, New York City, New York, U.S.	
28	Win	15–5–8	Jack Nelson	NWS	6	May 29, 1908	Roman A.C., Manhattan, New York City, New York, U.S.	
27	Win	14–5–8	Jack Fitzgerald	NWS	6	May 7, 1908	Broadway A.C., Philadelphia, Pennsylvania, U.S.	
26	Win	13–5–8	Cub White	NWS	6	May 4, 1908	West End A.C., Philadelphia, Pennsylvania, U.S.	
25	Draw	12–5–8	Billy Clark	NWS	6	Mar 28, 1908	National A.C., Philadelphia, Pennsylvania, U.S.	
24	Win	12–5–7	Alex Laird	KO	2 (6)	Mar 16, 1908	Latrobe, Pennsylvania, U.S.	
23	Win	11–5–7	Paul Moore	NWS	6	Dec 10, 1907	Rankin Athletic Club Rooms, Rankin, Pennsylvania, U.S.	
22	Loss	10–5–7	Dick Given	NWS	6	Oct 28, 1907	Rankin, Pennsylvania, U.S.	
21	Win	10–4–7	Andy Diamond	KO	1 (6)	Sep 14, 1907	Donora, Pennsylvania, U.S.	
20	Win	9–4–7	Al Martin	NWS	6	May 28, 1907	Greensburg, Pennsylvania, U.S.	
19	Loss	8–4–7	Paul Moore	NWS	6	Jan 10, 1907	East Pittsburgh, Pennsylvania, U.S.	
18	Win	8–3–7	Jock Simcoe	NWS	6	Dec 20, 1906	McKeesport, Pennsylvania, U.S.	
17	Draw	7–3–7	Paul Moore	NWS	6	Dec 11, 1906	Turner Hall, Pittsburgh, Pennsylvania, U.S.	
16	Win	7–3–6	James Frazier	NWS	6	Nov 12, 1906	Turner Hall, Pittsburgh, Pennsylvania, U.S.	
15	Win	6–3–6	Tom Broderick	TKO	3 (6)	Oct 29, 1906	Art Club, Ambridge, Pennsylvania, U.S.	
14	Win	5–3–6	George Decker	NWS	6	Oct 9, 1906	Mutual Benefit Hall, East Pittsburgh, Pennsylvania, U.S.	
13	Draw	4–3–6	George Fraser	PTS	32 (?)	Aug 25, 1906	Lorain, Ohio, U.S.	This was to be a fight to the finish and was held in secret to avoid police interference; Referee Dime stopped the bout and called it a draw
12	Draw	4–3–5	Jack Bruce	NWS	4	May 8, 1906	Turner Hall, Pittsburgh, Pennsylvania, U.S.	
11	Win	4–3–4	Ned Chernoff	NWS	4	Mar 26, 1906	Turner Hall, Pittsburgh, Pennsylvania, U.S.	
10	Draw	3–3–4	Mike Ward	NWS	4	Feb 27, 1906	Turner Hall, Pittsburgh, Pennsylvania, U.S.	
9	Win	3–3–3	Dick Given	NWS	4	Jan 25, 1906	Turner Hall, East Pittsburgh, Pennsylvania, U.S.	
8	Draw	2–3–3	Frank Diamond	NWS	6	Jan 24, 1906	Oakland Armory, Pittsburgh, Pennsylvania, U.S.	
7	Win	2–3–2	Jock Simcoe	NWS	6	Dec 14, 1905	East Pittsburgh, Pennsylvania, U.S.	
6	Loss	1–3–2	Elmer Morgan	KO	4 (6)	Jul 27, 1905	Mutual Benefit Hall, East Pittsburgh, Pennsylvania, U.S.	
5	Win	1–2–2	Battling Simpson	NWS	4	Mar 27, 1905	Wilmerding A.C., Wilmerding, Pennsylvania, U.S.	Listed as on Mar 28, but stated that it happened the previous night
4	Draw	0–2–2	John Ulm	NWS	4	Mar 27, 1905	Wilmerding A.C., Wilmerding, Pennsylvania, U.S.	
3	Loss	0–2–1	Frank Diamond	NWS	4	Mar 4, 1905	Business Men's Club, Pittsburgh, Pennsylvania, U.S.	
2	Loss	0–1–1	Frank Diamond	NWS	4	Feb 25, 1905	Business Men's Club, Pittsburgh, Pennsylvania, U.S.	
1	Draw	0–0–1	Patsy Hogan	NWS	4	Feb 18, 1905	Business Men's Club, Pittsburgh, Pennsylvania, U.S.	

== Boxing achievements ==
Titles in pretence
Vacant	World Middleweight Champion; February 22, 1912 – March 5, 1913 won undisputed title	Vacant Title next held by Eddie McGoorty; Australian recognition
Achievements
Preceded by Stanley Ketchel; Died	World Middleweight Champion; 5 March 1913 – 11 October 1913	Succeeded by George Chip

== Honors ==
Klaus was elected into the International Boxing Hall of Fame in 2008.

== See also ==
- List of middleweight boxing champions
