= George Chip =

Lithuanian-American boxer (1888–1960)

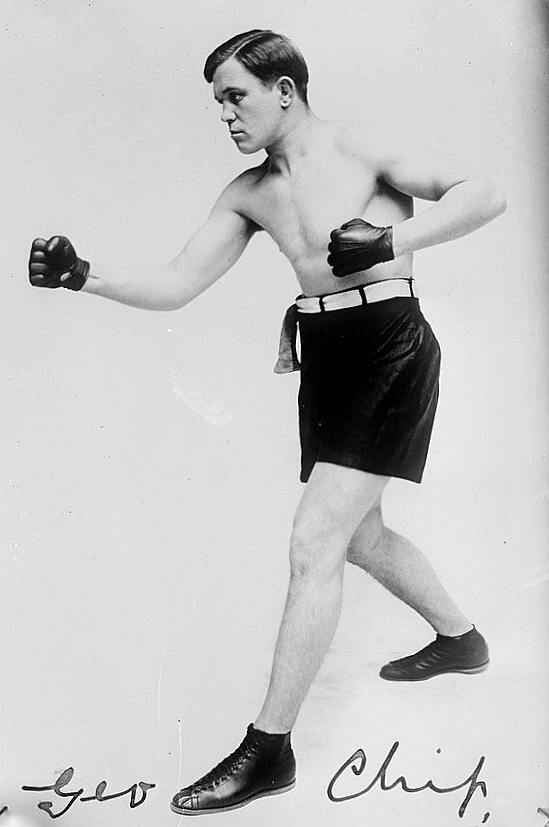
- Chip circa 1910

Personal information
- Nickname: The New Castle Miner Madison Miner
- Nationality: (United States) Lithuanian-American
- Born: George Chipulonis; August 25, 1888 Scranton, Pennsylvania
- Died: November 6, 1960 (aged 72) New Castle, Pennsylvania
- Weight: Middleweight

Boxing career
- Stance: Orthodox

Boxing record
- Total fights: 164
- Wins: 41
- Win by KO: 36
- Losses: 17
- Draws: 3 + over 100 no-decisions
- No contests: 1

George Chip (Lit. Jurgis Čepulionis, August 25, 1888 – November 6, 1960) was a Lithuanian-American boxer who was the World Middleweight Champion from 1913 to 1914 in an era of great middleweights. Chip came to be known as a heavy puncher with an impressive knockout ratio. In his time, he was known as "The Madison Miner" and "The New Castle Miner." He was the father of Major general William C. Chip, USMC.

== Early life and career ==
Chip was born on August 25, 1888, in Scranton but was raised in New Castle, Pennsylvania, in what is today the Pittsburgh metropolitan area, where most of his matches occurred. He was of Lithuanian descent. His manager was Jimmy Dime.

He was active in both baseball and football in his youth, and later worked in the coal mines in Madison, Pennsylvania. In January 1909, realizing his athletic gifts at the age of twenty, he decided to try boxing on the advice of L. B. Lewis, a mining Superintendent he knew. He won his first match when Billy Manfredo received a second round disqualification in Greensburgh, Pennsylvania. The following month he knocked out George Gill and John Chew. He continued to fight through 1910 with only one recorded loss.

== Taking the World Middleweight Title from Frank Klaus ==
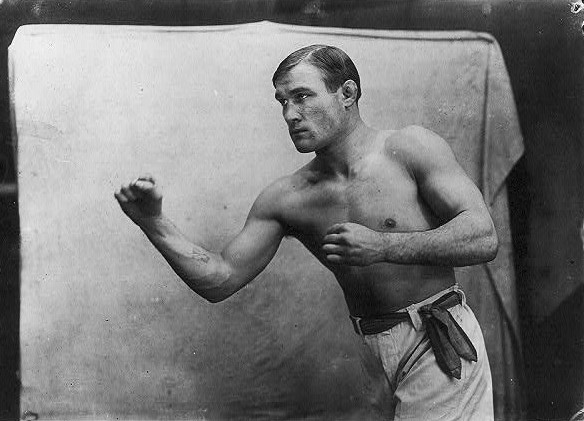
Frank Klaus

During a title fight on 11 October 1913, Chip surprised the crowd when he knocked out reigning world middleweight champion Frank Klaus with a strong right hook to the jaw near the end of the sixth and final round. Prior to the knockout, in the first five rounds, Chip never threatened to take the lead. The fight occurred at the old Pittsburgh City Hall at Market Square . It was the first knockout of Klaus's career. The extra weight Klaus was carrying in his midsection led many reporters to believe he had not trained adequately for the bout, and had underestimated the ability of his opponent.

=== Frequent bouts with Jack Dillon and "Buck" Crouse ===
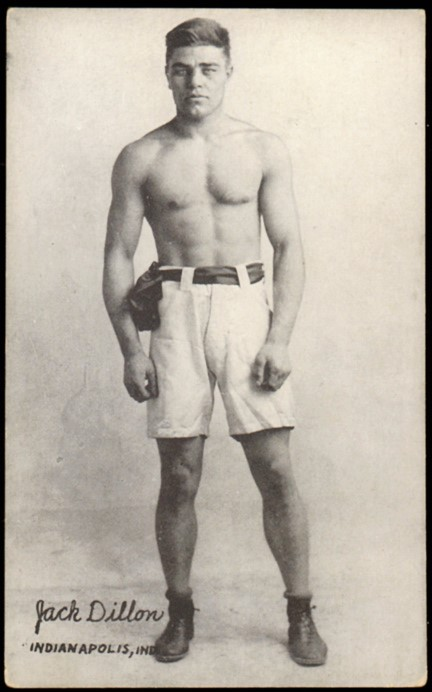
Jack Dillon

Chip fought the exceptional boxer Jack Dillon over ten times, usually losing to him in the opinions of newspapers. Dillon was an Indiana-born Hall of Famer who held the light heavyweight championship of the world from 1914 to 1916.

Chip fought Pittsburgh area boxer Albert "Buck" Crouse seven times during his career, mostly in no decision bouts, losing to him only once.

=== Defending the World Middleweight Title in no decision bouts ===
On November 25, 1913, after taking the title, Chip faced Tim O'Neil in a ten-round no decision bout in Racine, Wisconsin. Though he won the bout by newspaper decision, he would have lost the title had he been knocked out by O'Neil.

On December 23, 1913, some sources reported that Chip's rematch with Klaus in Pittsburgh was a middleweight championship, however, as the fight was fought at catchweights, boxing historians do not consider the bout a title match. After knocking down Klaus twice in the fifth, the referee called the bout, resulting in a Technical Knockout. The second win over the former title holder cemented Chip's place as champion.

On January 12, 1914, Chip faced Gus Christie in a ten-round no decision bout in Milwaukee, Wisconsin. Though he won the bout by newspaper decision, he would have lost the title had he been knocked out by Christie.

On January 14, 1914, Chip faced Tim O'Neil again in a ten-round no decision bout in Milwaukee, Wisconsin. He won the bout in a second-round TKO, exhibiting his strong punching abilities.

== Surrendering the World Middleweight Title in shocking loss to Al McCoy ==
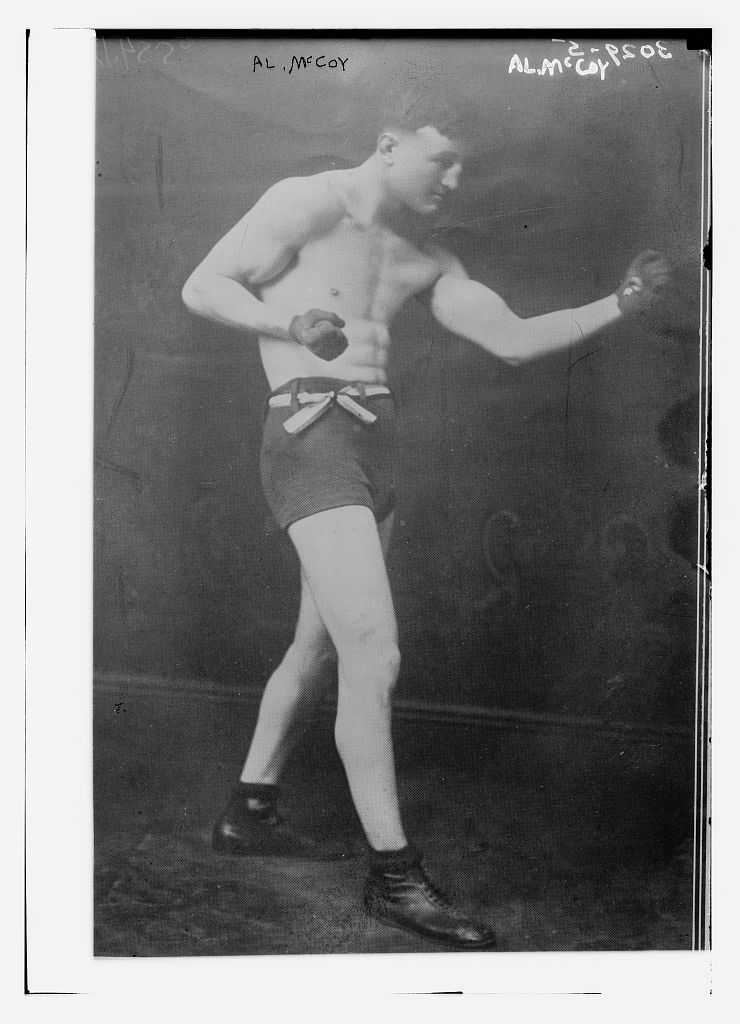
Al McCoy leading with his left

On April 7, 1914, six months after taking the title, Chip stunningly lost it to young southpaw Al McCoy in a surprise first round knock-out. McCoy was considered a light hitter with only a 23% knockout rate. McCoy's manager, Charlie Goldman, wisely advised his boxer to charge for a knockout against Chip from the first bell. Goldman wisely assumed Chip would box cautiously early in the first round against Al's unorthodox, left handed style.

Taking his manager's advice, McCoy landed a powerful left to Chip's jaw early in the first round, lifting him off the canvas, and achieving a victory that probably shocked the bookmakers. The knockout occurred just one minute and fifty seconds after the opening bell. The Pittsburgh Press noted that the Broadway Sporting Club in Brooklyn was only "fairly filled" as spectators may have stayed home expecting a loss or poor showing from McCoy. Robert Edgren, summarizing the last few seconds of the fight, wrote "McCoy's left fist started somewhere near his knees. He brought it up with all his strength. His body swung upward with the blow as though he had been swinging at a bag. His fist landed fairly on the point of the crouching champion's unguarded chin." Though Chip held the title only six months, he is remembered as a boxer who faced most of the serious challengers for the title.

== Career after loss of the World Middleweight Title ==
=== Bout with Jeff Smith, future Australian World Middleweight Champion ===
On December 7, 1915, Chip lost to Jeff Smith, future Australian World Middleweight Champion, in a seventh round disqualification at the Hippodrome in Boston. The New Castle News wrote that Chip was clearly winning the contest when he was disqualified by the referee for a low blow. Some reporters wrote the blow to the torso was not below the belt, and believed Chip was close to winning the bout by knockout.

=== Bouts with Jimmy Clabby ===
Between November 1914 and May 1915, Chip fought Jimmy Clabby four times. Clabby, an exceptional talent, competed for but never won a world title in his career, though he took the World Middleweight and Light Heavyweight titles of Australia and the Heavyweight Championship of New Zealand. On November 6, 1914, Chip lost a twenty-round bout with Clabby in Daly City, California, outside San Francisco. The San Francisco Chronicle reported that Clabby won easily, taking seventeen rounds. On March 22, 1915, Clabby beat Chip again in the opinion of newspapers, in a six-round no decision bout in Grand Rapids, Michigan.

=== Winning non-title rematch with Al McCoy ===
On January 20, 1916, after losing his Middleweight Title, Chip easily won a ten-round no decision rematch with Al McCoy in Brooklyn's Broadway Arena according to the New York Times. Reportedly, McCoy was badly battered in the bout, and at one point in the third round was down for nine seconds. Chip had knocked McCoy down for a short count earlier in the round. A knockout would have transferred the title back to Chip from reigning champion McCoy. According to The Pittsburgh Post, Chip was the aggressor throughout, and McCoy took one of worst beatings in the fight. But McCoy more importantly managed to last seven rounds after his knockdown without hitting the canvas and retained his title.

=== Competing for the Australian World Middleweight Championship ===
On September 30, 1916, Chip fell to a ninth-round knockout from Australian boxer Les Darcy for Australia's World Middleweight Title in Sydney. The Australian fans bet heavily on their national champion, who carried the fight decisively throughout. He followed on November 6, 1916, with an important fourteenth-round knockout victory over American boxer Art Magirl in Melbourne.

=== Bouts with Middleweight Champions Harry Greb and Mike Gibbons ===
Chip fought the great middleweight Harry Greb four times in his career, losing decisively to Greb on November 19, 1917, in a ten-round bout in Cincinnati, Ohio. On May 22, 1917, Greb beat Chip in an exciting ten round bout before a crowd of 4,000 in Pittsburgh. In two earlier fights in Pennsylvania, Chip beat Greb according to newspapers on June 26, 1916, but received a draw earlier in a closer fight in Pittsburgh in 1915.

==== Impressive win over Harry Greb ====
In their ten-round no decision bout on June 26, 1916, in New Castle, Pennsylvania, local newspapers agreed that Chip had the decisive edge over Greb in an impressive win. The New Castle Herald gave Chip every round, and the Post gave Greb only three rounds.

Between 1917 and 1919, Chip fought the great middleweight Mike Gibbons three times, on July 4, 1917, January 31, 1919, and June 11, 1919. Chip lost all three fights in the decision of most newspapers. Gibbons' claim to the World Middleweight Title in 1909 was a strong one, though it is not sanctioned today. Nonetheless, Gibbons was rated in the top 20 all time Middleweights by statistical boxing site BoxRec and The Ring Magazine.

==== Bouts with brothers Mike and Tommy Gibbons ====
In the July 1917 bout between Chip and Gibbons at Wright Field in Youngstown, Ohio, Gibbon's World Middleweight Title was at stake if he lost by knockout. The Washington Post wrote that "Gibbons won all the way". The Harrisburg Telegraph observed that Gibbons had better boxing science and technique, and though Chip may have had the stronger punches, they did not faze Gibbons who was able to avoid his blows and counterpunch effectively. In the last three rounds, the crowd of 5,000 witnessed the most exciting exchanges. In their slow January, 1919 bout in Duluth, Gibbons defeated Chip by a "wide margin" after returning from fifteen months in the Army. In a faster bout before a substantial crowd in Terre Haute, Indiana, on June 11, 1919, Chip landed several strong blows but they never fazed Gibbons who had the edge in their fight according to newspapers. Chip also fought Gibbons' brother Tommy Gibbons five times from 1917 to 1919 though he never beat him in the opinion of most newspapers.

== Retirement from boxing ==
In a rapid decline from February 1918 to April 1922, Chip won only four of thirty-seven bouts. After beating Lew Shupp and Frankie McGuire, Chip retired from boxing in the spring of 1922.

He died on November 6, 1960, at New Castle Hospital in his adopted hometown. Two days earlier, he had sustained a broken neck and two fractured legs after being struck by a car during a walk near his home.

== Professional boxing record ==
All information in this section is derived from BoxRec, unless otherwise stated.

=== Official Record ===
162 fights	41 wins	17 losses
By knockout	35	3
By decision	5	11
By disqualification	1	3
Draws	4	
No contests	2	
Newspaper decisions/draws	98	

All newspaper decisions are officially regarded as “no decision” bouts and are not counted as a win/loss/draw column.

No.	Result	Record	Opponent	Type	Round	Date	Age	Location	Notes
162	Loss	41–17–4 (100)	Whitey Wenzel	NWS	10	Apr 4, 1921	32 years, 222 days	Exposition Hall, Pittsburgh, Pennsylvania, U.S.	
161	Loss	41–17–4 (99)	Battling Ortega	PTS	15	Feb 21, 1921	32 years, 180 days	Broadway Arena, New York City, New York, U.S.	
160	Win	41–16–4 (99)	Jack Duffy	KO	10 (15)	Jan 29, 1921	32 years, 157 days	Commonwealth Sporting Club, New York City, New York, U.S.	
159	Loss	40–16–4 (99)	Brian Downey	NWS	10	Jan 7, 1921	32 years, 135 days	Gray's Armory, Cleveland, Ohio, U.S.	
158	Draw	40–16–4 (98)	Eddie McGoorty	NWS	10	Dec 6, 1920	32 years, 103 days	La Salle, Illinois, U.S.	
157	Loss	40–16–4 (97)	Ted Block	NWS	10	Nov 8, 1920	32 years, 75 days	Roller Palace Rink, Detroit, Michigan, U.S.	
156	Draw	40–16–4 (96)	Charley Nashert	PTS	10	Sep 24, 1920	32 years, 30 days	Western League Park, Oklahoma City, Oklahoma, U.S.	
155	Loss	40–16–3 (96)	Paul Roman	NWS	10	Sep 17, 1920	32 years, 23 days	Dallas, Texas, U.S.	
154	Loss	40–16–3 (95)	Jack Reeves	PTS	12	Sep 6, 1920	32 years, 12 days	Tulsa, Oklahoma, U.S.	
153	Loss	40–15–3 (95)	Johnny Howard	NWS	10	Aug 25, 1920	32 years, 0 days	Mount Royal Arena, Montreal, Quebec, Canada	
152	Loss	40–15–3 (94)	Happy Littleton	PTS	15	Jul 10, 1920	31 years, 320 days	Tulane Arena, New Orleans, Louisiana, U.S.	
151	Loss	40–14–3 (94)	Frank Carbone	NWS	12	Jun 14, 1920	31 years, 294 days	Idora Park, Youngstown, Ohio, U.S.	
150	Win	40–14–3 (93)	George K.O. Brown	PTS	20	Apr 19, 1920	31 years, 238 days	Tulane Arena, New Orleans, Louisiana, U.S.	
149	Loss	39–14–3 (93)	Tommy Robson	NWS	10	Mar 10, 1920	31 years, 198 days	Detroit, Michigan, U.S.	
148	Draw	39–14–3 (92)	George K.O. Brown	PTS	15	Dec 22, 1919	31 years, 119 days	Tulane Arena, New Orleans, Louisiana, U.S.	
147	Win	39–14–2 (92)	Martin Burke	TKO	10 (15)	Nov 28, 1919	31 years, 95 days	Louisiana Auditorium, New Orleans, Louisiana, U.S.	
146	Loss	38–14–2 (92)	Eugene Brosseau	NWS	12	Nov 11, 1919	31 years, 78 days	Portland, Maine, U.S.	
145	Win	38–14–2 (91)	Russell Maneri	KO	2 (15)	Oct 27, 1919	31 years, 63 days	Tulane Arena, New Orleans, Louisiana, U.S.	
144	Loss	37–14–2 (91)	Tommy Robson	NWS	8	Oct 20, 1919	31 years, 56 days	4th Regiment Armory, Jersey City, New Jersey, U.S.	
143	Draw	37–14–2 (90)	George K.O. Brown	NWS	10	Oct 1, 1919	31 years, 37 days	Arena Gardens, Detroit, Michigan, U.S.	
142	Loss	37–14–2 (89)	Johnny Howard	NWS	8	Jul 29, 1919	30 years, 338 days	Bayonne Pavilion, Bayonne, New Jersey, U.S.	
141	Loss	37–14–2 (88)	K.O. Willie Loughlin	NWS	10	Jul 22, 1919	30 years, 331 days	Baseball Park, Buffalo, New York, U.S.	
140	Win	37–14–2 (87)	Bud Clancy	TKO	2 (8)	Jun 17, 1919	30 years, 296 days	Coliseum, Saint Louis, Missouri, U.S.	
139	Loss	36–14–2 (87)	Mike Gibbons	NWS	10	Jun 11, 1919	30 years, 290 days	Three-I League Park, Terre Haute, Indiana, U.S.	
138	Loss	36–14–2 (86)	Jeff Smith	PTS	12	May 9, 1919	30 years, 257 days	Albaugh Theater, Baltimore, Maryland, U.S.	
137	Loss	36–13–2 (86)	Tommy Gibbons	PTS	10	Apr 10, 1919	30 years, 228 days	Stockyards Stadium, Denver, Colorado, U.S.	
136	Loss	36–12–2 (86)	Young Fisher	NWS	10	Mar 31, 1919	30 years, 218 days	Arena, Syracuse, New York, U.S.	
135	Loss	36–12–2 (85)	Tommy Robson	NWS	10	Mar 10, 1919	30 years, 197 days	Arena, Syracuse, New York, U.S.	
134	Loss	36–12–2 (84)	Mike Gibbons	NWS	10	Jan 31, 1919	30 years, 141 days	Shrine Auditorium, Duluth, Minnesota, U.S.	
133	Loss	36–12–2 (83)	Jimmy O'Hagan	NWS	6	Sep 28, 1918	30 years, 34 days	National A.C., Philadelphia, Pennsylvania, U.S.	
132	Loss	36–12–2 (82)	Leo Bens	PTS	10	Jul 4, 1918	29 years, 313 days	Butte, Montana, U.S.	
131	Loss	36–11–2 (82)	Eddie McGoorty	NWS	10	Jun 25, 1918	29 years, 304 days	Lakeside Arena, Racine, Wisconsin, U.S.	
130	Loss	36–11–2 (81)	Tommy Gibbons	NWS	12	May 3, 1918	29 years, 251 days	Coliseum, Des Moines, Iowa, U.S.	
129	Loss	36–11–2 (80)	Clay Turner	DQ	15 (15)	Apr 24, 1918	29 years, 242 days	Casino Hall, Bridgeport, Connecticut, U.S.	
128	Loss	36–10–2 (80)	Tommy Gibbons	NWS	10	Mar 7, 1918	29 years, 194 days	Town Hall, Scranton, Pennsylvania, U.S.	
127	Loss	36–10–2 (79)	Tommy Gibbons	NWS	10	Feb 4, 1918	29 years, 163 days	Southside Market House, Pittsburgh, Pennsylvania, U.S.	
126	Win	36–10–2 (78)	Jack Dillon	NWS	10	Jan 25, 1918	29 years, 153 days	Civic Auditorium, Duluth, Minnesota, U.S.	
125	Loss	36–10–2 (77)	Harry Greb	PTS	10	Nov 19, 1917	29 years, 86 days	Heuck's Opera House, Cincinnati, Ohio, U.S.	
124	Win	36–9–2 (77)	Al Rogers	KO	4 (10)	Nov 9, 1917	29 years, 76 days	Duluth, Minnesota, U.S.	
123	Loss	35–9–2 (77)	Tommy Gibbons	NWS	10	Aug 22, 1917	28 years, 362 days	Auditorium, Saint Paul, Minnesota, U.S.	
122	Win	35–9–2 (76)	Johnny Howard	PTS	12	Jul 24, 1917	28 years, 333 days	National A.C., Providence, Rhode Island, U.S.	
121	Loss	34–9–2 (76)	Mike Gibbons	NWS	12	Jul 4, 1917	28 years, 313 days	Wright Field, Youngstown, Ohio, U.S.	World middleweight title claim at stake; (via KO only)
120	Win	34–9–2 (75)	George K.O. Brown	NWS	10	Jun 8, 1917	28 years, 287 days	Lakeside Auditorium, Racine, Wisconsin, U.S.	
119	Loss	34–9–2 (74)	Jack Dillon	NWS	10	May 29, 1917	28 years, 277 days	Redland Field, Cincinnati, Ohio, U.S.	
118	Loss	34–9–2 (73)	Harry Greb	NWS	10	May 22, 1917	28 years, 270 days	Exposition Hall, Pittsburgh, Pennsylvania, U.S.	
117	Win	34–9–2 (72)	Val Sontag	KO	2 (12)	Apr 23, 1917	28 years, 241 days	Casino Hall, Bridgeport, Connecticut, U.S.	
116	Loss	33–9–2 (72)	K.O. Willie Loughlin	NWS	6	Apr 9, 1917	28 years, 227 days	Olympia A.C., Philadelphia, Pennsylvania, U.S.	
115	Win	33–9–2 (71)	Bob Moha	TKO	4 (12)	Mar 12, 1917	28 years, 199 days	Youngstown, Ohio, U.S.	
114	Win	32–9–2 (71)	Sailor Einert	KO	2 (?)	Feb 26, 1917	28 years, 185 days	Heuck's Opera House, Cincinnati, Ohio, U.S.	
113	Win	31–9–2 (71)	George K.O. Brown	NWS	12	Feb 19, 1917	28 years, 178 days	Grand Opera House, Youngstown, Ohio, U.S.	
112	Win	31–9–2 (70)	Art Magirl	KO	14 (15)	Nov 6, 1916	28 years, 73 days	West Melbourne Stadium, Melbourne, Victoria, Australia	
111	Loss	30–9–2 (70)	Les Darcy	KO	9 (20)	Sep 30, 1916	28 years, 36 days	Sydney Stadium, Sydney, New South Wales, Australia	For world middleweight title (Australian version)
110	Win	30–8–2 (70)	Harry Greb	NWS	10	Jun 26, 1916	27 years, 306 days	Coliseum, New Castle, Pennsylvania, U.S.	
109	Win	30–8–2 (69)	Sailor Grande	KO	14 (15)	May 15, 1916	27 years, 264 days	Casino Hall, Bridgeport, Connecticut, U.S.	
108	Draw	29–8–2 (69)	Gus Christie	NWS	10	Apr 28, 1916	27 years, 247 days	Cleveland A.C., Cleveland, Ohio, U.S.	
107	Win	29–8–2 (68)	Johnny Howard	KO	6 (10)	Mar 23, 1916	27 years, 211 days	Casino Hall, Bridgeport, Connecticut, U.S.	
106	Win	28–8–2 (68)	Gus Christie	PTS	8	Mar 13, 1916	27 years, 201 days	Phoenix A.C., Memphis, Tennessee, U.S.	
105	Loss	27–8–2 (68)	Young Ahearn	DQ	5 (10)	Feb 22, 1916	27 years, 181 days	Broadway Arena, New York City, New York, U.S.	
104	Win	27–7–2 (68)	Frankie Notter	KO	4 (?)	Feb 12, 1916	27 years, 171 days	Clermont Avenue Rink, New York City, New York, U.S.	
103	Win	26–7–2 (68)	Al McCoy	NWS	10	Jan 20, 1916	27 years, 148 days	Broadway Arena, New York City, New York, U.S.	
102	Win	26–7–2 (67)	Silent Martin	NWS	10	Jan 8, 1916	27 years, 136 days	Clermont Avenue Rink, New York City, New York, U.S.	
101	Loss	26–7–2 (66)	Willie K.O. Brennan	NWS	10	Dec 25, 1915	27 years, 122 days	Columbia A.C., Scranton, Pennsylvania, U.S.	
100	Win	26–7–2 (65)	Frank Loughrey	TKO	9 (12)	Dec 21, 1915	27 years, 118 days	Hippodrome, Boston, Massachusetts, U.S.	
99	Win	25–7–2 (65)	Harry Baker	RTD	3 (6)	Dec 16, 1915	27 years, 113 days	Town Hall, Scranton, Pennsylvania U.S.	
98	Loss	24–7–2 (65)	Jeff Smith	DQ	7 (12)	Dec 7, 1915	27 years, 104 days	Hippodrome, Boston, Massachusetts, U.S.	
97	Win	24–6–2 (65)	Sailor Grande	NWS	10	Nov 30, 1915	27 years, 97 days	Opera House, New Castle, Pennsylvania, U.S.	
96	Win	24–6–2 (64)	Jackie Clark	NWS	10	Oct 29, 1915	27 years, 65 days	Columbia Theater, Scranton, Pennsylvania, U.S.	
95	Draw	24–6–2 (63)	Harry Greb	NWS	6	Oct 18, 1915	27 years, 54 days	Duquesne Garden, Pittsburgh, Pennsylvania, U.S.	
94	Draw	24–6–2 (62)	Jack Dillon	PTS	10	Jul 5, 1915	26 years, 314 days	Kansas City, Missouri, U.S.	
93	Win	24–6–1 (62)	Jack McCarron	NWS	10	Jun 21, 1915	26 years, 300 days	Capitol District A.C., Albany, New York, U.S.	
92	Loss	24–6–1 (61)	Sailor Grande	NWS	6	Jun 14, 1915	26 years, 293 days	Olympia A.C., Philadelphia, Pennsylvania, U.S.	
91	NC	24–6–1 (60)	Jimmy Clabby	NC	8 (10)	May 12, 1915	26 years, 260 days	St. Nicholas Arena, New York City, New York, U.S.	No contest for "stalling"
90	Win	24–6–1 (59)	Jimmy Clabby	NWS	10	Apr 28, 1915	26 years, 246 days	Marinette, Wisconsin, U.S.	
89	Win	24–6–1 (58)	Al McCoy	NWS	10	Apr 6, 1915	26 years, 224 days	Broadway S.C., New York City, New York, U.S.	NYSAC middleweight title at stake; (via KO only)
88	Loss	24–6–1 (57)	Jimmy Clabby	NWS	6	Mar 22, 1915	26 years, 209 days	Coliseum, Grand Rapids, Michigan, U.S.	
87	Win	24–6–1 (56)	Sailor Szarmanski	KO	8 (10)	Mar 15, 1915	26 years, 202 days	Heuck's Opera House, Cincinnati, Ohio, U.S.	
86	Loss	23–6–1 (56)	Buck Crouse	NWS	6	Feb 22, 1915	26 years, 181 days	Duquesne Garden, Pittsburgh, Pennsylvania, U.S.	
85	Loss	23–6–1 (55)	Jack McCarron	NWS	6	Feb 20, 1915	26 years, 179 days	National A.C., Philadelphia, Pennsylvania, U.S.	
84	Loss	23–6–1 (54)	Jimmy Clabby	PTS	20	Nov 6, 1914	26 years, 73 days	Coffroth's Arena, Daly City, California, U.S.	
83	Win	23–5–1 (54)	Billy Murray	KO	4 (20)	Sep 30, 1914	26 years, 36 days	Coffroth's Arena, Daly City, California, U.S.	
82	Win	22–5–1 (54)	Sailor Ed Petroskey	PTS	20	Jul 31, 1914	25 years, 340 days	Pavilion Rink, San Francisco, California, U.S.	
81	Win	21–5–1 (54)	Billy Murray	KO	15 (15)	Jul 4, 1914	25 years, 313 days	Coffroth's Arena, Daly City, California, U.S.	
80	Win	20–5–1 (54)	Sailor Ed Petroskey	KO	12 (20)	May 26, 1914	25 years, 274 days	Arena, Vernon, California, U.S.	
79	Loss	19–5–1 (54)	Leo Houck	NWS	12	Apr 21, 1914	25 years, 239 days	Grand Opera House, Youngstown, Ohio, U.S.	
78	Win	19–5–1 (53)	George K.O. Brown	NWS	12	Apr 14, 1914	25 years, 232 days	Akron, Ohio, U.S.	
77	Loss	19–5–1 (52)	Al McCoy	KO	1 (10)	Apr 7, 1914	25 years, 225 days	Broadway S.C., New York City, New York, U.S.	Lost NYSAC middleweight title
76	Win	19–4–1 (52)	Joe Borrell	NWS	6	Jan 26, 1914	25 years, 154 days	Olympia A.C., Philadelphia, Pennsylvania, U.S.	NYSAC middleweight title at stake; (via KO only)
75	Win	19–4–1 (51)	Tim O'Neil	TKO	2 (10)	Jan 19, 1914	25 years, 147 days	Powers' Opera House, Grand Rapids, Michigan, U.S.	Retained NYSAC middleweight title
74	Win	18–4–1 (51)	Gus Christie	NWS	10	Jan 12, 1914	25 years, 140 days	Southside A.A., Milwaukee, Wisconsin, U.S.	NYSAC middleweight title at stake; (via KO only)
73	Win	18–4–1 (50)	Frank Klaus	TKO	5 (6)	Dec 23, 1913	25 years, 120 days	Duquesne Garden, Pittsburgh, Pennsylvania, U.S.	
72	Win	17–4–1 (50)	Tim O'Neil	NWS	10	Nov 25, 1913	25 years, 92 days	Lakeside Auditorium, Racine, Wisconsin, U.S.	NYSAC middleweight title at stake; (via KO only)
71	Loss	17–4–1 (49)	Leo Houck	NWS	6	Nov 15, 1913	25 years, 82 days	National A.C., Philadelphia, Pennsylvania, U.S.	NYSAC middleweight title at stake; (via KO only)
70	Win	17–4–1 (48)	Frank Klaus	TKO	6 (6)	Oct 11, 1913	25 years, 47 days	Old City Hall, Pittsburgh, Pennsylvania, U.S.	Won NYSAC middleweight title
69	Win	16–4–1 (48)	Tommy Gavigan	TKO	11 (12)	Sep 30, 1913	25 years, 36 days	Akron Casino, Akron, Ohio, U.S.	
68	Win	15–4–1 (48)	Dick Gilbert	NWS	10	May 14, 1913	24 years, 262 days	Coliseum, New Castle, Pennsylvania, U.S.	
67	Loss	15–4–1 (47)	Jack Dillon	NWS	12	Apr 14, 1913	24 years, 232 days	Anderson Auditorium, Youngstown, Ohio, U.S.	
66	Win	15–4–1 (46)	Walter Monaghan	NWS	6	Mar 17, 1913	24 years, 204 days	Northside Arena, Pittsburgh, Pennsylvania, U.S.	
65	Win	15–4–1 (45)	Tommy Gavigan	KO	2 (10)	Feb 24, 1913	24 years, 183 days	Anderson Auditorium, Youngstown, Ohio, U.S.	
64	Win	14–4–1 (45)	Tommy Connors	NWS	6	Feb 17, 1913	24 years, 176 days	Scranton, Pennsylvania, U.S.	
63	Win	14–4–1 (44)	Peck Miller	NWS	6	Feb 10, 1913	24 years, 169 days	Frohsinn Hall, Altoona, Pennsylvania, U.S.	
62	Win	14–4–1 (43)	Emmett "Kid" Wagner	NWS	10	Jan 28, 1913	24 years, 156 days	Germania Hall, Rochester, New York, U.S.	
61	Win	14–4–1 (42)	Howard Morrow	NWS	10	Jan 20, 1913	24 years, 148 days	Alhambra, Syracuse, New York, U.S.	
60	Win	14–4–1 (41)	Tommy Gavigan	NWS	6	Jan 4, 1913	24 years, 132 days	Old City Hall, Pittsburgh, Pennsylvania U.S.	
59	Draw	14–4–1 (40)	Willie K.O. Brennan	NWS	10	Dec 5, 1912	24 years, 102 days	Broadway Auditorium, Buffalo, New York, U.S.	
58	Win	14–4–1 (39)	Paddy Lavin	TKO	7 (12)	Dec 2, 1912	24 years, 99 days	Twilight A.C., Youngstown, Ohio, U.S.	
57	Win	13–4–1 (39)	Howard Morrow	NWS	10	Nov 18, 1912	24 years, 85 days	Alhambra, Syracuse, New York, U.S.	
56	Loss	13–4–1 (38)	Jack Dillon	NWS	10	Nov 11, 1912	24 years, 78 days	Columbus, Ohio, U.S.	
55	Win	13–4–1 (37)	George K.O. Brown	NWS	10	Oct 28, 1912	24 years, 64 days	Alhambra, Syracuse, New York, U.S.	
54	Loss	13–4–1 (36)	Jack Dillon	NWS	6	Oct 19, 1912	24 years, 55 days	Old City Hall, Pittsburgh, Pennsylvania, U.S.	
53	Win	13–4–1 (35)	Grant Clark	TKO	6 (6)	Oct 4, 1912	24 years, 40 days	Southside Market House, Pittsburgh, Pennsylvania, U.S.	
52	Win	12–4–1 (35)	Tim O'Neil	NWS	6	Sep 21, 1912	24 years, 27 days	Old City Hall, Pittsburgh, Pennsylvania, U.S.	
51	Win	12–4–1 (34)	Tim O'Neil	NWS	6	Aug 8, 1912	23 years, 349 days	Duquesne Garden, Pittsburgh, Pennsylvania, U.S.	
50	Loss	12–4–1 (33)	Jack Dillon	NWS	10	Jul 25, 1912	23 years, 335 days	Empire Theater, Indianapolis, Indiana, U.S.	
49	Loss	12–4–1 (32)	Leo Houck	NWS	6	Jun 13, 1912	23 years, 293 days	Rossmere Park, Lancaster, Pennsylvania, U.S.	
48	Win	12–4–1 (31)	Grant Clark	NWS	10	May 16, 1912	23 years, 265 days	Columbus, Ohio, U.S.	
47	Loss	12–4–1 (30)	Emmett "Kid" Wagner	PTS	10	Apr 22, 1912	23 years, 241 days	Orpheum Theatre, Easton, Pennsylvania, U.S.	
46	Loss	12–3–1 (30)	Buck Crouse	NWS	6	Apr 18, 1912	23 years, 237 days	Old City Hall, Pittsburgh, Pennsylvania, U.S.	
45	Draw	12–3–1 (29)	Jimmy Howard	PTS	12	Mar 25, 1912	23 years, 213 days	Akron, Ohio, U.S.	
44	Win	12–3 (29)	Billy Berger	NWS	6	Mar 18, 1912	23 years, 206 days	Old City Hall, Pittsburgh, Pennsylvania, U.S.	
43	Draw	12–3 (28)	Battling Simpson	NWS	10	Feb 28, 1912	23 years, 187 days	Johnstown, Pennsylvania, U.S.	
42	Loss	12–3 (27)	Jeff Smith	PTS	15	Feb 20, 1912	23 years, 179 days	Rhode Island A.C., Thornton, Rhode Island, U.S.	
41	Win	12–2 (27)	Walter Coffey	KO	3 (10)	Feb 13, 1912	23 years, 172 days	Olympic A.C., Rochester, New York, U.S.	
40	Loss	11–2 (27)	Jack Dillon	NWS	6	Feb 10, 1912	23 years, 169 days	Old City Hall, Pittsburgh, Pennsylvania, U.S.	
39	Loss	11–2 (26)	Buck Crouse	NWS	6	Jan 22, 1912	23 years, 150 days	Old City Hall, Pittsburgh, Pennsylvania, U.S.	
38	Draw	11–2 (25)	Buck Crouse	NWS	6	Jan 1, 1912	23 years, 129 days	Old City Hall, Pittsburgh, Pennsylvania, U.S.	
37	Win	11–2 (24)	Joe Gorman	KO	5 (12)	Dec 18, 1911	23 years, 115 days	Akron, Ohio, U.S.	
36	Win	10–2 (24)	George K.O. Brown	NWS	6	Dec 2, 1911	23 years, 99 days	Old City Hall, Pittsburgh, U.S.	
35	Loss	10–2 (23)	Jack Dillon	NWS	12	Nov 22, 1911	23 years, 89 days	Olympic A.C., Youngstown, Ohio, U.S.	
34	Win	10–2 (22)	Jack Abbott	TKO	5 (6)	Oct 21, 1911	23 years, 57 days	National A.C., Philadelphia, Pennsylvania, U.S.	
33	Loss	9–2 (22)	Leo Houck	NWS	6	Sep 16, 1911	23 years, 22 days	National A.C., Philadelphia, Pennsylvania, U.S.	
32	Draw	9–2 (21)	Jack Abbott	NWS	6	May 15, 1911	22 years, 263 days	Palisades Rink, McKeesport, Pennsylvania, U.S.	
31	Loss	9–2 (20)	Jack Dillon	NWS	10	Apr 28, 1911	22 years, 246 days	Fair Grounds Casino, Terre Haute, Indiana, U.S.	
30	Win	9–2 (19)	George Jackson	KO	3 (10)	Apr 13, 1911	22 years, 231 days	New Castle, Pennsylvania, U.S.	
29	Win	8–2 (19)	Jack Fitzgerald	NWS	6	Mar 14, 1911	22 years, 201 days	Duquesne Garden, Pittsburgh, Pennsylvania, U.S.	
28	Win	8–2 (18)	Jack Morgan	KO	11 (10)	Feb 10, 1911	22 years, 169 days	Wonderland Park, Indianapolis, Indiana, U.S.	
27	Loss	7–2 (18)	Jack Dillon	PTS	15	Jan 25, 1911	22 years, 153 days	Gymnastic Club, Dayton, Ohio, U.S.	
26	Win	7–1 (18)	Cy Flynn	NWS	10	Dec 19, 1910	22 years, 116 days	Salamanca, New York, U.S.	
25	Loss	7–1 (17)	Jimmy Perry	NWS	6	Nov 21, 1910	22 years, 88 days	Princess Auditorium, Pittsburgh, Pennsylvania, U.S.	
24	Win	7–1 (16)	Battling Simpson	PTS	15	Nov 14, 1910	22 years, 81 days	Greensburg, Pennsylvania, U.S.	
23	Loss	6–1 (16)	Jack Dillon	NWS	6	Oct 21, 1910	22 years, 57 days	Old City Hall, Pittsburgh, Pennsylvania, U.S.	
22	Loss	6–1 (15)	Buck Crouse	NWS	6	Sep 10, 1910	22 years, 16 days	Old City Hall, Pittsburgh, Pennsylvania, U.S.	
21	Loss	6–1 (14)	Billy Berger	NWS	6	Jul 16, 1910	21 years, 325 days	Old City Hall, Pittsburgh, Pennsylvania, U.S.	
20	Draw	6–1 (13)	Billy Berger	NWS	6	Jun 25, 1910	21 years, 304 days	Old City Hall, Pittsburgh, Pennsylvania, U.S.	
19	Loss	6–1 (12)	Jimmy Perry	NWS	6	May 21, 1910	21 years, 269 days	Old City Hall, Pittsburgh, Pennsylvania, U.S.	
18	Loss	6–1 (11)	Buck Crouse	NWS	6	May 13, 1910	21 years, 261 days	Turner Hall, Pittsburgh, Pennsylvania, U.S.	
17	Draw	6–1 (10)	Battling Conners	NWS	6	Apr 23, 1910	21 years, 241 days	Old City Hall, Pittsburgh, Pennsylvania, U.S.	
16	Loss	6–1 (9)	Buck Crouse	TKO	3 (6)	Mar 23, 1910	21 years, 210 days	Duquesne Garden, Pittsburgh, Pennsylvania, U.S.	
15	Win	6–0 (9)	Billy Manfredo	KO	5 (6)	Mar 14, 1910	21 years, 201 days	Keaggy Theater, Greensburg, Pennsylvania, U.S.	
14	Win	5–0 (9)	Tom McMahon	NWS	6	Mar 2, 1910	21 years, 189 days	Duquesne Garden, Pittsburgh, Pennsylvania, U.S.	
13	Win	5–0 (8)	Billy Manfredo	NWS	10	Dec 20, 1909	21 years, 117 days	Keaggy Rink, Greensburg, Pennsylvania, U.S.	
12	ND	5–0 (7)	Battling Simpson	ND	6	Dec 2, 1909	21 years, 99 days	Herminie, Pennsylvania, U.S.	
11	Draw	5–0 (6)	Billy Manfredo	NWS	6	Nov 15, 1909	21 years, 82 days	Johnstown, Pennsylvania, U.S.	
10	Draw	5–0 (5)	Jimmy Perry	NWS	6	Sep 20, 1909	21 years, 26 days	Keystone Hall, Madison, Pennsylvania, U.S.	
9	Loss	5–0 (4)	Jack Abbott	NWS	6	Aug 4, 1909	20 years, 344 days	Keaggy Rink, Greensburg, Pennsylvania, U.S.	
8	Win	5–0 (3)	Thunderbolt Lees	NWS	3	May 20, 1909	20 years, 268 days	Mars Club, Johnstown, Pennsylvania, U.S.	
7	Win	5–0 (2)	Punch Legal	TKO	3 (3)	May 20, 1909	20 years, 268 days	Mars Club, Johnstown, Pennsylvania, U.S.	
6	Win	4–0 (2)	Billy Manfredo	NWS	6	Apr 23, 1909	20 years, 241 days	Keaggy Rink, Greensburg, Pennsylvania, U.S.	
5	Win	4–0 (1)	Billy Manfredo	NWS	6	Mar 25, 1909	20 years, 212 days	Auditorium, Johnstown, Pennsylvania, U.S.	
4	Win	4–0	Battling Conners	KO	4 (6)	Mar 15, 1909	20 years, 202 days	Showalter Theater, Latrobe, Pennsylvania, U.S.	
3	Win	3–0	Johnny Chew	KO	1 (?)	Mar 9, 1909	20 years, 196 days	Keaggy Rink, Greensburg, Pennsylvania, U.S.	
2	Win	2–0	George Gill	KO	2 (?)	Feb 3, 1909	20 years, 162 days	Madison, Pennsylvania, U.S.	
1	Win	1–0	Billy Manfredo	DQ	2 (4)	Jan 30, 1909	20 years, 158 days	Keaggy Rink, Greensburg, Pennsylvania, U.S.	

=== Unofficial record ===
162 fights	77 wins	67 losses
By knockout	35	3
By decision	41	61
By disqualification	1	3
Draws	16	
No contests	2	

Record with the inclusion of newspaper decisions to the win/loss/draw column.

No.	Result	Record	Opponent	Type	Round	Date	Age	Location	Notes
162	Loss	77–67–16 (2)	Whitey Wenzel	NWS	10	Apr 4, 1921	32 years, 222 days	Exposition Hall, Pittsburgh, Pennsylvania, U.S.	
161	Loss	77–66–16 (2)	Battling Ortega	PTS	15	Feb 21, 1921	32 years, 180 days	Broadway Arena, New York City, New York, U.S.	
160	Win	77–65–16 (2)	Jack Duffy	KO	10 (15)	Jan 29, 1921	32 years, 157 days	Commonwealth Sporting Club, New York City, New York, U.S.	
159	Loss	76–65–16 (2)	Brian Downey	NWS	10	Jan 7, 1921	32 years, 135 days	Gray's Armory, Cleveland, Ohio, U.S.	
158	Draw	76–64–16 (2)	Eddie McGoorty	NWS	10	Dec 6, 1920	32 years, 103 days	La Salle, Illinois, U.S.	
157	Loss	76–64–15 (2)	Ted Block	NWS	10	Nov 8, 1920	32 years, 75 days	Roller Palace Rink, Detroit, Michigan, U.S.	
156	Draw	76–63–15 (2)	Charley Nashert	PTS	10	Sep 24, 1920	32 years, 30 days	Western League Park, Oklahoma City, Oklahoma, U.S.	
155	Loss	76–63–14 (2)	Paul Roman	NWS	10	Sep 17, 1920	32 years, 23 days	Dallas, Texas, U.S.	
154	Loss	76–62–14 (2)	Jack Reeves	PTS	12	Sep 6, 1920	32 years, 12 days	Tulsa, Oklahoma, U.S.	
153	Loss	76–61–14 (2)	Johnny Howard	NWS	10	Aug 25, 1920	32 years, 0 days	Mount Royal Arena, Montreal, Quebec, Canada	
152	Loss	76–60–14 (2)	Happy Littleton	PTS	15	Jul 10, 1920	31 years, 320 days	Tulane Arena, New Orleans, Louisiana, U.S.	
151	Loss	76–59–14 (2)	Frank Carbone	NWS	12	Jun 14, 1920	31 years, 294 days	Idora Park, Youngstown, Ohio, U.S.	
150	Win	76–58–14 (2)	George K.O. Brown	PTS	20	Apr 19, 1920	31 years, 238 days	Tulane Arena, New Orleans, Louisiana, U.S.	
149	Loss	75–58–14 (2)	Tommy Robson	NWS	10	Mar 10, 1920	31 years, 198 days	Detroit, Michigan, U.S.	
148	Draw	75–57–14 (2)	George K.O. Brown	PTS	15	Dec 22, 1919	31 years, 119 days	Tulane Arena, New Orleans, Louisiana, U.S.	
147	Win	75–57–13 (2)	Martin Burke	TKO	10 (15)	Nov 28, 1919	31 years, 95 days	Louisiana Auditorium, New Orleans, Louisiana, U.S.	
146	Loss	74–57–13 (2)	Eugene Brosseau	NWS	12	Nov 11, 1919	31 years, 78 days	Portland, Maine, U.S.	
145	Win	74–56–13 (2)	Russell Maneri	KO	2 (15)	Oct 27, 1919	31 years, 63 days	Tulane Arena, New Orleans, Louisiana, U.S.	
144	Loss	73–56–13 (2)	Tommy Robson	NWS	8	Oct 20, 1919	31 years, 56 days	4th Regiment Armory, Jersey City, New Jersey, U.S.	
143	Draw	73–55–13 (2)	George K.O. Brown	NWS	10	Oct 1, 1919	31 years, 37 days	Arena Gardens, Detroit, Michigan, U.S.	
142	Loss	73–55–12 (2)	Johnny Howard	NWS	8	Jul 29, 1919	30 years, 338 days	Bayonne Pavilion, Bayonne, New Jersey, U.S.	
141	Loss	73–54–12 (2)	K.O. Willie Loughlin	NWS	10	Jul 22, 1919	30 years, 331 days	Baseball Park, Buffalo, New York, U.S.	
140	Win	73–53–12 (2)	Bud Clancy	TKO	2 (8)	Jun 17, 1919	30 years, 296 days	Coliseum, Saint Louis, Missouri, U.S.	
139	Loss	72–53–12 (2)	Mike Gibbons	NWS	10	Jun 11, 1919	30 years, 290 days	Three-I League Park, Terre Haute, Indiana, U.S.	
138	Loss	72–52–12 (2)	Jeff Smith	PTS	12	May 9, 1919	30 years, 257 days	Albaugh Theater, Baltimore, Maryland, U.S.	
137	Loss	72–51–12 (2)	Tommy Gibbons	PTS	10	Apr 10, 1919	30 years, 228 days	Stockyards Stadium, Denver, Colorado, U.S.	
136	Loss	72–50–12 (2)	Young Fisher	NWS	10	Mar 31, 1919	30 years, 218 days	Arena, Syracuse, New York, U.S.	
135	Loss	72–49–12 (2)	Tommy Robson	NWS	10	Mar 10, 1919	30 years, 197 days	Arena, Syracuse, New York, U.S.	
134	Loss	72–48–12 (2)	Mike Gibbons	NWS	10	Jan 31, 1919	30 years, 141 days	Shrine Auditorium, Duluth, Minnesota, U.S.	
133	Loss	72–47–12 (2)	Jimmy O'Hagan	NWS	6	Sep 28, 1918	30 years, 34 days	National A.C., Philadelphia, Pennsylvania, U.S.	
132	Loss	72–46–12 (2)	Leo Bens	PTS	10	Jul 4, 1918	29 years, 313 days	Butte, Montana, U.S.	
131	Loss	72–45–12 (2)	Eddie McGoorty	NWS	10	Jun 25, 1918	29 years, 304 days	Lakeside Arena, Racine, Wisconsin, U.S.	
130	Loss	72–44–12 (2)	Tommy Gibbons	NWS	12	May 3, 1918	29 years, 251 days	Coliseum, Des Moines, Iowa, U.S.	
129	Loss	72–43–12 (2)	Clay Turner	DQ	15 (15)	Apr 24, 1918	29 years, 242 days	Casino Hall, Bridgeport, Connecticut, U.S.	
128	Loss	72–42–12 (2)	Tommy Gibbons	NWS	10	Mar 7, 1918	29 years, 194 days	Town Hall, Scranton, Pennsylvania, U.S.	
127	Loss	72–41–12 (2)	Tommy Gibbons	NWS	10	Feb 4, 1918	29 years, 163 days	Southside Market House, Pittsburgh, Pennsylvania, U.S.	
126	Win	72–40–12 (2)	Jack Dillon	NWS	10	Jan 25, 1918	29 years, 153 days	Civic Auditorium, Duluth, Minnesota, U.S.	
125	Loss	71–40–12 (2)	Harry Greb	PTS	10	Nov 19, 1917	29 years, 86 days	Heuck's Opera House, Cincinnati, Ohio, U.S.	
124	Win	71–39–12 (2)	Al Rogers	KO	4 (10)	Nov 9, 1917	29 years, 76 days	Duluth, Minnesota, U.S.	
123	Loss	70–39–12 (2)	Tommy Gibbons	NWS	10	Aug 22, 1917	28 years, 362 days	Auditorium, Saint Paul, Minnesota, U.S.	
122	Win	70–38–12 (2)	Johnny Howard	PTS	12	Jul 24, 1917	28 years, 333 days	National A.C., Providence, Rhode Island, U.S.	
121	Loss	69–38–12 (2)	Mike Gibbons	NWS	12	Jul 4, 1917	28 years, 313 days	Wright Field, Youngstown, Ohio, U.S.	World middleweight title claim at stake; (via KO only)
120	Win	69–37–12 (2)	George K.O. Brown	NWS	10	Jun 8, 1917	28 years, 287 days	Lakeside Auditorium, Racine, Wisconsin, U.S.	
119	Loss	68–37–12 (2)	Jack Dillon	NWS	10	May 29, 1917	28 years, 277 days	Redland Field, Cincinnati, Ohio, U.S.	
118	Loss	68–36–12 (2)	Harry Greb	NWS	10	May 22, 1917	28 years, 270 days	Exposition Hall, Pittsburgh, Pennsylvania, U.S.	
117	Win	68–35–12 (2)	Val Sontag	KO	2 (12)	Apr 23, 1917	28 years, 241 days	Casino Hall, Bridgeport, Connecticut, U.S.	
116	Loss	67–35–12 (2)	K.O. Willie Loughlin	NWS	6	Apr 9, 1917	28 years, 227 days	Olympia A.C., Philadelphia, Pennsylvania, U.S.	
115	Win	67–34–12 (2)	Bob Moha	TKO	4 (12)	Mar 12, 1917	28 years, 199 days	Youngstown, Ohio, U.S.	
114	Win	66–34–12 (2)	Sailor Einert	KO	2 (?)	Feb 26, 1917	28 years, 185 days	Heuck's Opera House, Cincinnati, Ohio, U.S.	
113	Win	65–34–12 (2)	George K.O. Brown	NWS	12	Feb 19, 1917	28 years, 178 days	Grand Opera House, Youngstown, Ohio, U.S.	
112	Win	64–34–12 (2)	Art Magirl	KO	14 (15)	Nov 6, 1916	28 years, 73 days	West Melbourne Stadium, Melbourne, Victoria, Australia	
111	Loss	63–34–12 (2)	Les Darcy	KO	9 (20)	Sep 30, 1916	28 years, 36 days	Sydney Stadium, Sydney, New South Wales, Australia	For world middleweight title (Australian version)
110	Win	63–33–12 (2)	Harry Greb	NWS	10	Jun 26, 1916	27 years, 306 days	Coliseum, New Castle, Pennsylvania, U.S.	
109	Win	62–33–12 (2)	Sailor Grande	KO	14 (15)	May 15, 1916	27 years, 264 days	Casino Hall, Bridgeport, Connecticut, U.S.	
108	Draw	61–33–12 (2)	Gus Christie	NWS	10	Apr 28, 1916	27 years, 247 days	Cleveland A.C., Cleveland, Ohio, U.S.	
107	Win	61–33–11 (2)	Johnny Howard	KO	6 (10)	Mar 23, 1916	27 years, 211 days	Casino Hall, Bridgeport, Connecticut, U.S.	
106	Win	60–33–11 (2)	Gus Christie	PTS	8	Mar 13, 1916	27 years, 201 days	Phoenix A.C., Memphis, Tennessee, U.S.	
105	Loss	59–33–11 (2)	Young Ahearn	DQ	5 (10)	Feb 22, 1916	27 years, 181 days	Broadway Arena, New York City, New York, U.S.	
104	Win	59–32–11 (2)	Frankie Notter	KO	4 (?)	Feb 12, 1916	27 years, 171 days	Clermont Avenue Rink, New York City, New York, U.S.	
103	Win	58–32–11 (2)	Al McCoy	NWS	10	Jan 20, 1916	27 years, 148 days	Broadway Arena, New York City, New York, U.S.	
102	Win	57–32–11 (2)	Silent Martin	NWS	10	Jan 8, 1916	27 years, 136 days	Clermont Avenue Rink, New York City, New York, U.S.	
101	Loss	56–32–11 (2)	Willie K.O. Brennan	NWS	10	Dec 25, 1915	27 years, 122 days	Columbia A.C., Scranton, Pennsylvania, U.S.	
100	Win	56–31–11 (2)	Frank Loughrey	TKO	9 (12)	Dec 21, 1915	27 years, 118 days	Hippodrome, Boston, Massachusetts, U.S.	
99	Win	55–31–11 (2)	Harry Baker	RTD	3 (6)	Dec 16, 1915	27 years, 113 days	Town Hall, Scranton, Pennsylvania U.S.	
98	Loss	54–31–11 (2)	Jeff Smith	DQ	7 (12)	Dec 7, 1915	27 years, 104 days	Hippodrome, Boston, Massachusetts, U.S.	
97	Win	54–30–11 (2)	Sailor Grande	NWS	10	Nov 30, 1915	27 years, 97 days	Opera House, New Castle, Pennsylvania, U.S.	
96	Win	53–30–11 (2)	Jackie Clark	NWS	10	Oct 29, 1915	27 years, 65 days	Columbia Theater, Scranton, Pennsylvania, U.S.	
95	Draw	52–30–11 (2)	Harry Greb	NWS	6	Oct 18, 1915	27 years, 54 days	Duquesne Garden, Pittsburgh, Pennsylvania, U.S.	
94	Draw	52–30–10 (2)	Jack Dillon	PTS	10	Jul 5, 1915	26 years, 314 days	Kansas City, Missouri, U.S.	
93	Win	52–30–9 (2)	Jack McCarron	NWS	10	Jun 21, 1915	26 years, 300 days	Capitol District A.C., Albany, New York, U.S.	
92	Loss	51–30–9 (2)	Sailor Grande	NWS	6	Jun 14, 1915	26 years, 293 days	Olympia A.C., Philadelphia, Pennsylvania, U.S.	
91	NC	51–29–9 (2)	Jimmy Clabby	NC	8 (10)	May 12, 1915	26 years, 260 days	St. Nicholas Arena, New York City, New York, U.S.	No contest for "stalling"
90	Win	51–29–9 (1)	Jimmy Clabby	NWS	10	Apr 28, 1915	26 years, 246 days	Marinette, Wisconsin, U.S.	
89	Win	50–29–9 (1)	Al McCoy	NWS	10	Apr 6, 1915	26 years, 224 days	Broadway S.C., New York City, New York, U.S.	NYSAC middleweight title at stake; (via KO only)
88	Loss	49–29–9 (1)	Jimmy Clabby	NWS	6	Mar 22, 1915	26 years, 209 days	Coliseum, Grand Rapids, Michigan, U.S.	
87	Win	49–28–9 (1)	Sailor Szarmanski	KO	8 (10)	Mar 15, 1915	26 years, 202 days	Heuck's Opera House, Cincinnati, Ohio, U.S.	
86	Loss	48–28–9 (1)	Buck Crouse	NWS	6	Feb 22, 1915	26 years, 181 days	Duquesne Garden, Pittsburgh, Pennsylvania, U.S.	
85	Loss	48–27–9 (1)	Jack McCarron	NWS	6	Feb 20, 1915	26 years, 179 days	National A.C., Philadelphia, Pennsylvania, U.S.	
84	Loss	48–26–9 (1)	Jimmy Clabby	PTS	20	Nov 6, 1914	26 years, 73 days	Coffroth's Arena, Daly City, California, U.S.	
83	Win	48–25–9 (1)	Billy Murray	KO	4 (20)	Sep 30, 1914	26 years, 36 days	Coffroth's Arena, Daly City, California, U.S.	
82	Win	47–25–9 (1)	Sailor Ed Petroskey	PTS	20	Jul 31, 1914	25 years, 340 days	Pavilion Rink, San Francisco, California, U.S.	
81	Win	46–25–9 (1)	Billy Murray	KO	15 (15)	Jul 4, 1914	25 years, 313 days	Coffroth's Arena, Daly City, California, U.S.	
80	Win	45–25–9 (1)	Sailor Ed Petroskey	KO	12 (20)	May 26, 1914	25 years, 274 days	Arena, Vernon, California, U.S.	
79	Loss	44–25–9 (1)	Leo Houck	NWS	12	Apr 21, 1914	25 years, 239 days	Grand Opera House, Youngstown, Ohio, U.S.	
78	Win	44–24–9 (1)	George K.O. Brown	NWS	12	Apr 14, 1914	25 years, 232 days	Akron, Ohio, U.S.	
77	Loss	43–24–9 (1)	Al McCoy	KO	1 (10)	Apr 7, 1914	25 years, 225 days	Broadway S.C., New York City, New York, U.S.	Lost NYSAC middleweight title
76	Win	43–23–9 (1)	Joe Borrell	NWS	6	Jan 26, 1914	25 years, 154 days	Olympia A.C., Philadelphia, Pennsylvania, U.S.	NYSAC middleweight title at stake; (via KO only)
75	Win	42–23–9 (1)	Tim O'Neil	TKO	2 (10)	Jan 19, 1914	25 years, 147 days	Powers' Opera House, Grand Rapids, Michigan, U.S.	Retained NYSAC middleweight title
74	Win	41–23–9 (1)	Gus Christie	NWS	10	Jan 12, 1914	25 years, 140 days	Southside A.A., Milwaukee, Wisconsin, U.S.	NYSAC middleweight title at stake; (via KO only)
73	Win	40–23–9 (1)	Frank Klaus	TKO	5 (6)	Dec 23, 1913	25 years, 120 days	Duquesne Garden, Pittsburgh, Pennsylvania, U.S.	
72	Win	39–23–9 (1)	Tim O'Neil	NWS	10	Nov 25, 1913	25 years, 92 days	Lakeside Auditorium, Racine, Wisconsin, U.S.	NYSAC middleweight title at stake; (via KO only)
71	Loss	38–23–9 (1)	Leo Houck	NWS	6	Nov 15, 1913	25 years, 82 days	National A.C., Philadelphia, Pennsylvania, U.S.	NYSAC middleweight title at stake; (via KO only)
70	Win	38–22–9 (1)	Frank Klaus	TKO	6 (6)	Oct 11, 1913	25 years, 47 days	Old City Hall, Pittsburgh, Pennsylvania, U.S.	Won NYSAC middleweight title
69	Win	37–22–9 (1)	Tommy Gavigan	TKO	11 (12)	Sep 30, 1913	25 years, 36 days	Akron Casino, Akron, Ohio, U.S.	
68	Win	36–22–9 (1)	Dick Gilbert	NWS	10	May 14, 1913	24 years, 262 days	Coliseum, New Castle, Pennsylvania, U.S.	
67	Loss	35–22–9 (1)	Jack Dillon	NWS	12	Apr 14, 1913	24 years, 232 days	Anderson Auditorium, Youngstown, Ohio, U.S.	
66	Win	35–21–9 (1)	Walter Monaghan	NWS	6	Mar 17, 1913	24 years, 204 days	Northside Arena, Pittsburgh, Pennsylvania, U.S.	
65	Win	34–21–9 (1)	Tommy Gavigan	KO	2 (10)	Feb 24, 1913	24 years, 183 days	Anderson Auditorium, Youngstown, Ohio, U.S.	
64	Win	33–21–9 (1)	Tommy Connors	NWS	6	Feb 17, 1913	24 years, 176 days	Scranton, Pennsylvania, U.S.	
63	Win	32–21–9 (1)	Peck Miller	NWS	6	Feb 10, 1913	24 years, 169 days	Frohsinn Hall, Altoona, Pennsylvania, U.S.	
62	Win	31–21–9 (1)	Emmett "Kid" Wagner	NWS	10	Jan 28, 1913	24 years, 156 days	Germania Hall, Rochester, New York, U.S.	
61	Win	30–21–9 (1)	Howard Morrow	NWS	10	Jan 20, 1913	24 years, 148 days	Alhambra, Syracuse, New York, U.S.	
60	Win	29–21–9 (1)	Tommy Gavigan	NWS	6	Jan 4, 1913	24 years, 132 days	Old City Hall, Pittsburgh, Pennsylvania U.S.	
59	Draw	28–21–9 (1)	Willie K.O. Brennan	NWS	10	Dec 5, 1912	24 years, 102 days	Broadway Auditorium, Buffalo, New York, U.S.	
58	Win	28–21–8 (1)	Paddy Lavin	TKO	7 (12)	Dec 2, 1912	24 years, 99 days	Twilight A.C., Youngstown, Ohio, U.S.	
57	Win	27–21–8 (1)	Howard Morrow	NWS	10	Nov 18, 1912	24 years, 85 days	Alhambra, Syracuse, New York, U.S.	
56	Loss	26–21–8 (1)	Jack Dillon	NWS	10	Nov 11, 1912	24 years, 78 days	Columbus, Ohio, U.S.	
55	Win	26–20–8 (1)	George K.O. Brown	NWS	10	Oct 28, 1912	24 years, 64 days	Alhambra, Syracuse, New York, U.S.	
54	Loss	25–20–8 (1)	Jack Dillon	NWS	6	Oct 19, 1912	24 years, 55 days	Old City Hall, Pittsburgh, Pennsylvania, U.S.	
53	Win	25–19–8 (1)	Grant Clark	TKO	6 (6)	Oct 4, 1912	24 years, 40 days	Southside Market House, Pittsburgh, Pennsylvania, U.S.	
52	Win	24–19–8 (1)	Tim O'Neil	NWS	6	Sep 21, 1912	24 years, 27 days	Old City Hall, Pittsburgh, Pennsylvania, U.S.	
51	Win	23–19–8 (1)	Tim O'Neil	NWS	6	Aug 8, 1912	23 years, 349 days	Duquesne Garden, Pittsburgh, Pennsylvania, U.S.	
50	Loss	22–19–8 (1)	Jack Dillon	NWS	10	Jul 25, 1912	23 years, 335 days	Empire Theater, Indianapolis, Indiana, U.S.	
49	Loss	22–18–8 (1)	Leo Houck	NWS	6	Jun 13, 1912	23 years, 293 days	Rossmere Park, Lancaster, Pennsylvania, U.S.	
48	Win	22–17–8 (1)	Grant Clark	NWS	10	May 16, 1912	23 years, 265 days	Columbus, Ohio, U.S.	
47	Loss	21–17–8 (1)	Emmett "Kid" Wagner	PTS	10	Apr 22, 1912	23 years, 241 days	Orpheum Theatre, Easton, Pennsylvania, U.S.	
46	Loss	21–16–8 (1)	Buck Crouse	NWS	6	Apr 18, 1912	23 years, 237 days	Old City Hall, Pittsburgh, Pennsylvania, U.S.	
45	Draw	21–15–8 (1)	Jimmy Howard	PTS	12	Mar 25, 1912	23 years, 213 days	Akron, Ohio, U.S.	
44	Win	21–15–7 (1)	Billy Berger	NWS	6	Mar 18, 1912	23 years, 206 days	Old City Hall, Pittsburgh, Pennsylvania, U.S.	
43	Draw	20–15–7 (1)	Battling Simpson	NWS	10	Feb 28, 1912	23 years, 187 days	Johnstown, Pennsylvania, U.S.	
42	Loss	20–15–6 (1)	Jeff Smith	PTS	15	Feb 20, 1912	23 years, 179 days	Rhode Island A.C., Thornton, Rhode Island, U.S.	
41	Win	20–14–6 (1)	Walter Coffey	KO	3 (10)	Feb 13, 1912	23 years, 172 days	Olympic A.C., Rochester, New York, U.S.	
40	Loss	19–14–6 (1)	Jack Dillon	NWS	6	Feb 10, 1912	23 years, 169 days	Old City Hall, Pittsburgh, Pennsylvania, U.S.	
39	Loss	19–13–6 (1)	Buck Crouse	NWS	6	Jan 22, 1912	23 years, 150 days	Old City Hall, Pittsburgh, Pennsylvania, U.S.	
38	Draw	19–12–6 (1)	Buck Crouse	NWS	6	Jan 1, 1912	23 years, 129 days	Old City Hall, Pittsburgh, Pennsylvania, U.S.	
37	Win	19–12–5 (1)	Joe Gorman	KO	5 (12)	Dec 18, 1911	23 years, 115 days	Akron, Ohio, U.S.	
36	Win	18–12–5 (1)	George K.O. Brown	NWS	6	Dec 2, 1911	23 years, 99 days	Old City Hall, Pittsburgh, U.S.	
35	Loss	17–12–5 (1)	Jack Dillon	NWS	12	Nov 22, 1911	23 years, 89 days	Olympic A.C., Youngstown, Ohio, U.S.	
34	Win	17–11–5 (1)	Jack Abbott	TKO	5 (6)	Oct 21, 1911	23 years, 57 days	National A.C., Philadelphia, Pennsylvania, U.S.	
33	Loss	16–11–5 (1)	Leo Houck	NWS	6	Sep 16, 1911	23 years, 22 days	National A.C., Philadelphia, Pennsylvania, U.S.	
32	Draw	16–10–5 (1)	Jack Abbott	NWS	6	May 15, 1911	22 years, 263 days	Palisades Rink, McKeesport, Pennsylvania, U.S.	
31	Loss	16–10–4 (1)	Jack Dillon	NWS	10	Apr 28, 1911	22 years, 246 days	Fair Grounds Casino, Terre Haute, Indiana, U.S.	
30	Win	16–9–4 (1)	George Jackson	KO	3 (10)	Apr 13, 1911	22 years, 231 days	New Castle, Pennsylvania, U.S.	
29	Win	15–9–4 (1)	Jack Fitzgerald	NWS	6	Mar 14, 1911	22 years, 201 days	Duquesne Garden, Pittsburgh, Pennsylvania, U.S.	
28	Win	14–9–4 (1)	Jack Morgan	KO	11 (10)	Feb 10, 1911	22 years, 169 days	Wonderland Park, Indianapolis, Indiana, U.S.	
27	Loss	13–9–4 (1)	Jack Dillon	PTS	15	Jan 25, 1911	22 years, 153 days	Gymnastic Club, Dayton, Ohio, U.S.	
26	Win	13–8–4 (1)	Cy Flynn	NWS	10	Dec 19, 1910	22 years, 116 days	Salamanca, New York, U.S.	
25	Loss	12–8–4 (1)	Jimmy Perry	NWS	6	Nov 21, 1910	22 years, 88 days	Princess Auditorium, Pittsburgh, Pennsylvania, U.S.	
24	Win	12–7–4 (1)	Battling Simpson	PTS	15	Nov 14, 1910	22 years, 81 days	Greensburg, Pennsylvania, U.S.	
23	Loss	11–7–4 (1)	Jack Dillon	NWS	6	Oct 21, 1910	22 years, 57 days	Old City Hall, Pittsburgh, Pennsylvania, U.S.	
22	Loss	11–6–4 (1)	Buck Crouse	NWS	6	Sep 10, 1910	22 years, 16 days	Old City Hall, Pittsburgh, Pennsylvania, U.S.	
21	Loss	11–5–4 (1)	Billy Berger	NWS	6	Jul 16, 1910	21 years, 325 days	Old City Hall, Pittsburgh, Pennsylvania, U.S.	
20	Draw	11–4–4 (1)	Billy Berger	NWS	6	Jun 25, 1910	21 years, 304 days	Old City Hall, Pittsburgh, Pennsylvania, U.S.	
19	Loss	11–4–3 (1)	Jimmy Perry	NWS	6	May 21, 1910	21 years, 269 days	Old City Hall, Pittsburgh, Pennsylvania, U.S.	
18	Loss	11–3–3 (1)	Buck Crouse	NWS	6	May 13, 1910	21 years, 261 days	Turner Hall, Pittsburgh, Pennsylvania, U.S.	
17	Draw	11–2–3 (1)	Battling Conners	NWS	6	Apr 23, 1910	21 years, 241 days	Old City Hall, Pittsburgh, Pennsylvania, U.S.	
16	Loss	11–2–2 (1)	Buck Crouse	TKO	3 (6)	Mar 23, 1910	21 years, 210 days	Duquesne Garden, Pittsburgh, Pennsylvania, U.S.	
15	Win	11–1–2 (1)	Billy Manfredo	KO	5 (6)	Mar 14, 1910	21 years, 201 days	Keaggy Theater, Greensburg, Pennsylvania, U.S.	
14	Win	10–1–2 (1)	Tom McMahon	NWS	6	Mar 2, 1910	21 years, 189 days	Duquesne Garden, Pittsburgh, Pennsylvania, U.S.	
13	Win	9–1–2 (1)	Billy Manfredo	NWS	10	Dec 20, 1909	21 years, 117 days	Keaggy Rink, Greensburg, Pennsylvania, U.S.	
12	ND	8–1–2 (1)	Battling Simpson	ND	6	Dec 2, 1909	21 years, 99 days	Herminie, Pennsylvania, U.S.	
11	Draw	8–1–2	Billy Manfredo	NWS	6	Nov 15, 1909	21 years, 82 days	Johnstown, Pennsylvania, U.S.	
10	Draw	8–1–1	Jimmy Perry	NWS	6	Sep 20, 1909	21 years, 26 days	Keystone Hall, Madison, Pennsylvania, U.S.	
9	Loss	8–1	Jack Abbott	NWS	6	Aug 4, 1909	20 years, 344 days	Keaggy Rink, Greensburg, Pennsylvania, U.S.	
8	Win	8–0	Thunderbolt Lees	NWS	3	May 20, 1909	20 years, 268 days	Mars Club, Johnstown, Pennsylvania, U.S.	
7	Win	7–0	Punch Legal	TKO	3 (3)	May 20, 1909	20 years, 268 days	Mars Club, Johnstown, Pennsylvania, U.S.	
6	Win	6–0	Billy Manfredo	NWS	6	Apr 23, 1909	20 years, 241 days	Keaggy Rink, Greensburg, Pennsylvania, U.S.	
5	Win	5–0	Billy Manfredo	NWS	6	Mar 25, 1909	20 years, 212 days	Auditorium, Johnstown, Pennsylvania, U.S.	
4	Win	4–0	Battling Conners	KO	4 (6)	Mar 15, 1909	20 years, 202 days	Showalter Theater, Latrobe, Pennsylvania, U.S.	
3	Win	3–0	Johnny Chew	KO	1 (?)	Mar 9, 1909	20 years, 196 days	Keaggy Rink, Greensburg, Pennsylvania, U.S.	
2	Win	2–0	George Gill	KO	2 (?)	Feb 3, 1909	20 years, 162 days	Madison, Pennsylvania, U.S.	
1	Win	1–0	Billy Manfredo	DQ	2 (4)	Jan 30, 1909	20 years, 158 days	Keaggy Rink, Greensburg, Pennsylvania, U.S.	

== Achievements ==
Achievements
Preceded by Frank Klaus	World Middleweight Champion; October 11, 1913 – April 7, 1914	Succeeded by Al McCoy

== See also ==
- List of middleweight boxing champions
