= The Life Story of Les Darcy =

1955 Australian radio serial

- Genre: drama serial
- Running time: 30 mins (9:30 pm – 10:00 pm)
- Country of origin: Australia
- Language: English
- Directed by: John Cameron
- Recording studio: Adelaide
- Original release: 18 March 1955
- No. of series: 1
- No. of episodes: 26

The Life Story of Les Darcy is a 1955 Australian radio serial which dramatised the life of boxer Les Darcy. John Cameron produced and Alan Lane played the title role. The show was recorded in Adelaide and was also known as The Darcy Story.

Episodes were recorded as 13 one-hour installments. They were broadcast for thirty minutes. The series was criticised for its lack of accuracy by Darcy's family.
