= Billy Murray (boxer) =

American boxer

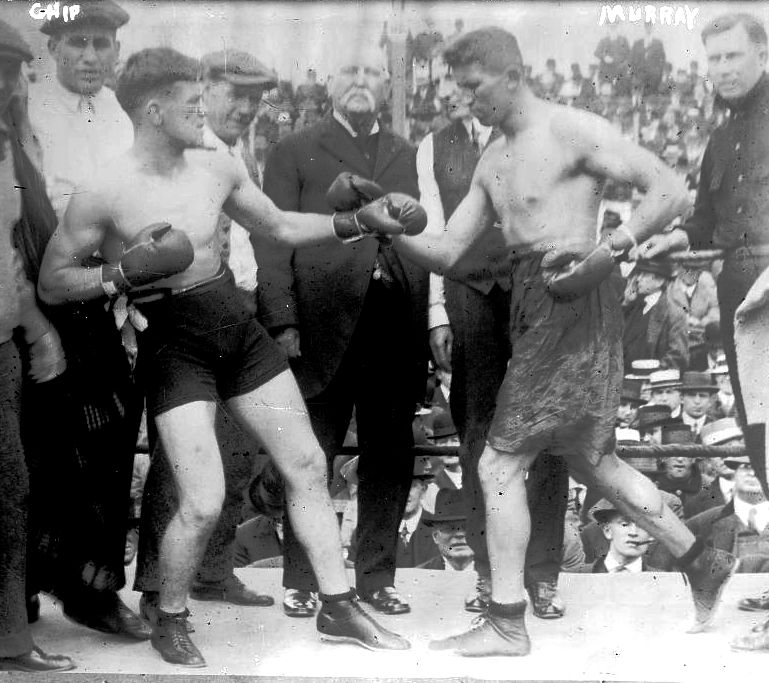
Murray (on the right) fighting against George Chip in 1914

John Marks (April 18, 1892 – March 4, 1926), better known as Billy Murray, was an American boxer in the early 20th century. He died from tuberculosis, which he contracted during the First World War.

== Boxing career ==
Although initially starting off rather weak, with 3 wins, 2 losses, and a draw, Murray had an incredible win streak afterwards. He was undefeated in his next 49 fights, against boxers such as Anton LaGrave, Johnny McCarthy, Jimmy Clabby, and many others. However, he was defeated twice in a row by a boxer known as George Chip. He won 2 more consecutive fights, then lost the next 9 fights in a row. He fought 24 more fights afterwards, bringing his record to 60 wins (45 by knockout), 16 losses, and 9 draws.
