= George Knockout Brown =

American boxer

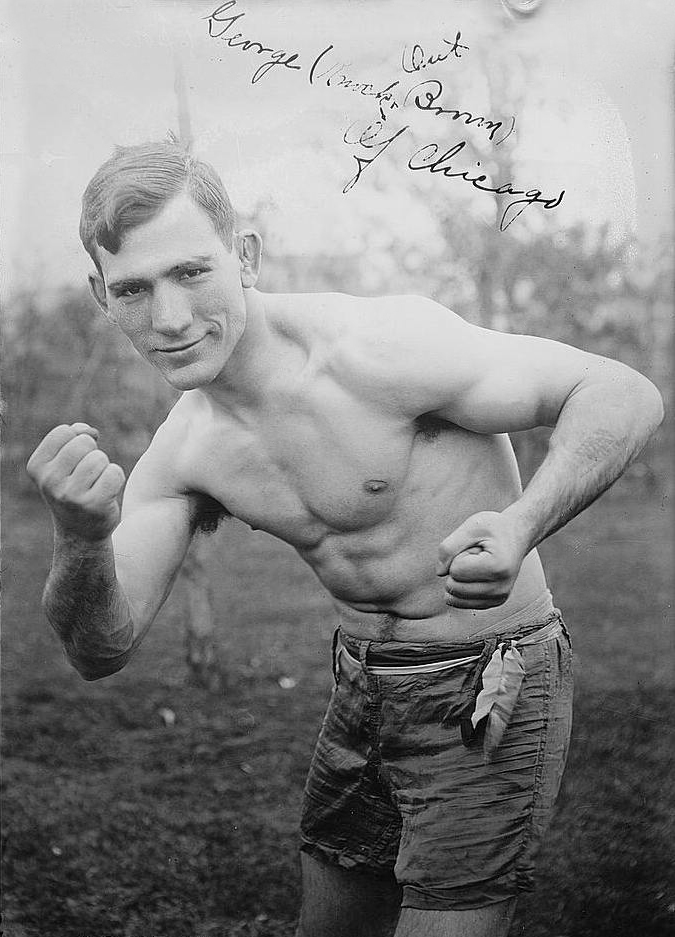
c. 1915

George Contas (August 25, 1890 – September 21, 1971) also known as George Knockout Brown was a Greek-American middleweight boxer from Chicago, Illinois.

== Biography ==
He was born on August 25, 1890, in Sparta, Laconia, Greece. His family migrated to Chicago, Illinois. He traveled many times to Australia to fight. He reportedly took the name "Knockout" after he "knocked out a string of young fellows" and "Brown" because his friends noted his preference for clothes of that color.

In December 1917, he was drafted for service in the National Army, but discharged after rejection by physical examiners. He was accepted into the United States Army in 1919. After his boxing career, he was a Sergeant in the Cicero Police Department. George and his wife, Sally, had no children. He died on the 21st of September, 1971 aged 80.
