= Eddie McGoorty =

American boxer

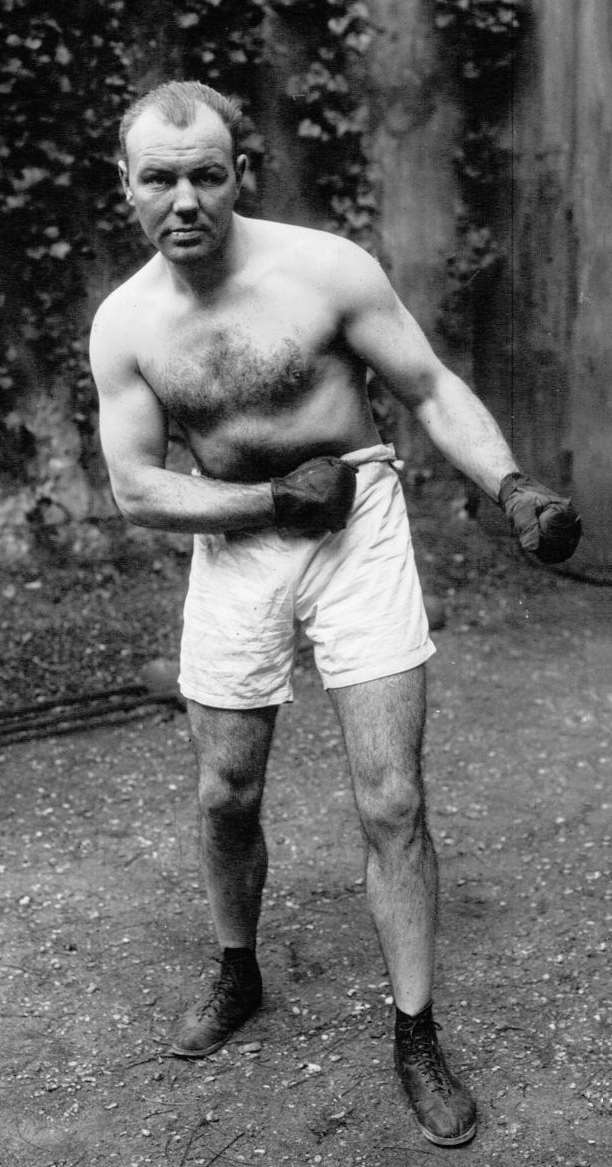
- McGoorty in France in 1919

Personal information
- Born: Edward Martin McGoorty; July 31, 1889 Eureka, Wisconsin, United States
- Died: November 2, 1929 (aged 40)
- Height: 5 ft 10 in (1.78 m)
- Weight: Middleweight

Boxing career
- Reach: 73 in (185 cm)
- Stance: Orthodox

Boxing record
- Total fights: 133
- Wins: 89
- Win by KO: 43
- Losses: 25
- Draws: 19

Edward Martin "Eddie" McGoorty (July 31, 1889 – November 2, 1929) was a middleweight American boxer who won the Australian version of the World Middleweight Title during his career.

McGoorty won the amateur 130 lb Boxing Championship of Wisconsin in 1904, at the age of 15. He began boxing professionally in 1905 under the name Edwin Van Dusart. He was briefly recognized as the World Middleweight Champion in Sydney, Australia. His last recorded bout took place in 1922.

McGoorty was the 2016 Inductee for the Australian National Boxing Hall of Fame International category.

Titles in pretence
Inaugural Champion	World Middleweight Champion; January 1, 1914 – March 14, 1914; Only Recognized in Australia	Succeeded by Jeff Smith
