= Midfield (disambiguation) =

Midfield is the part of a sports pitch that lies approximately in the center.

Midfield may also refer to:

- Midfield, Alabama, United States, a town
  - Midfield High School
- Midfield, County Mayo, Ireland, a village
- Midfield, Highland, Scotland, a hamlet
- Midfield, Texas, United States, an unincorporated community
- The midfield, the group of midfielders in a team

== See also ==
- Midfielder (disambiguation)
