= Michael Gibbons =

Michael or Mike Gibbons may refer to:

- Michael Gibbons (Medal of Honor) (1866–1933), United States Navy sailor and Medal of Honor recipient
- Mike Gibbons (ice hockey) (born 1955), American ice hockey coach
- Michael R. Gibbons (born 1959), American state legislator in Missouri
- Michael Gibbons (boxer) (born 1978), American lightweight boxer
- Michael Gibbons (footballer) (born 1995), Australian footballer
- Michael P. Gibbons, judge in Nevada
- Mick Gibbons (1890–1952), Scottish footballer
- Mike Gibbons (boxer) (1887–1956), American welterweight/middleweight boxer
- Mike Gibbons (American football) (1951–2005), American football player
- Mike Gibbons (rugby union) (1913–1962), Australian rugby union player
- Mike Gibbons (banker), former Republican primary Senate candidate in Ohio
- Mike Gibbins (1949–2005), English drummer for the band Badfinger, birth name Michael Gibbons
- Mike Gibbons (died 2016), lead vocalist and trumpeter for Bo Donaldson and The Heywoods

== See also ==
- Mike Gibbon (born 1942), English television producer and director
