= Jeff Smith (boxer) =

American boxer (1891–1962)

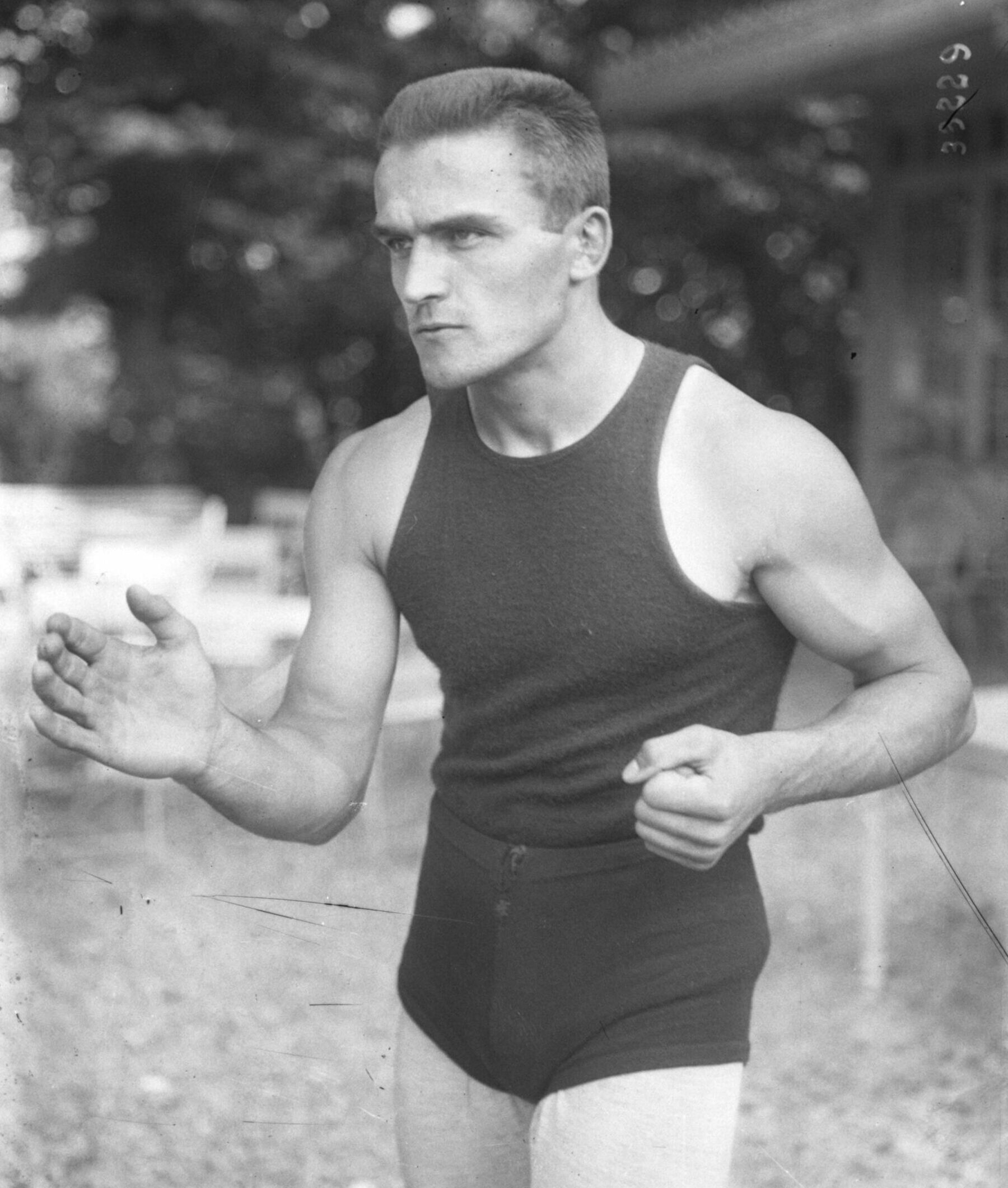

Personal information
- Nickname: The Bayonne Globetrotter
- Born: Jerome Jefferds; April 23, 1891 New York City, U.S
- Died: February 3, 1962 (aged 70)
- Height: 5 ft 8.5 in (1.74 m)
- Weight: Middleweight

Boxing career
- Reach: 71 in (180 cm)
- Stance: Orthodox

Boxing record
- Total fights: 183; with the inclusion of newspaper decisions
- Wins: 141
- Win by KO: 48
- Losses: 34
- Draws: 5
- No contests: 3

Jerome "Jeff Smith" Jefferds (April 23, 1891 – February 3, 1962) was an American professional boxer who held the Australian version of the World Middleweight Title during his career. Despite his relative anonymity, Smith faced off against some the best fighters of his era, including Harry Greb, Gene Tunney, Mike Gibbons, Georges Carpentier, Les Darcy and Tommy Loughran. Statistical boxing website BoxRec lists Smith as the 17th greatest middleweight ever, while Ring Magazine founder Nat Fleischer ranked Smith as the No. 10 Middleweight of all-time. He was inducted into the Ring Magazine hall of fame in 1969 and the International Boxing Hall of Fame in 2013.

== Early career ==
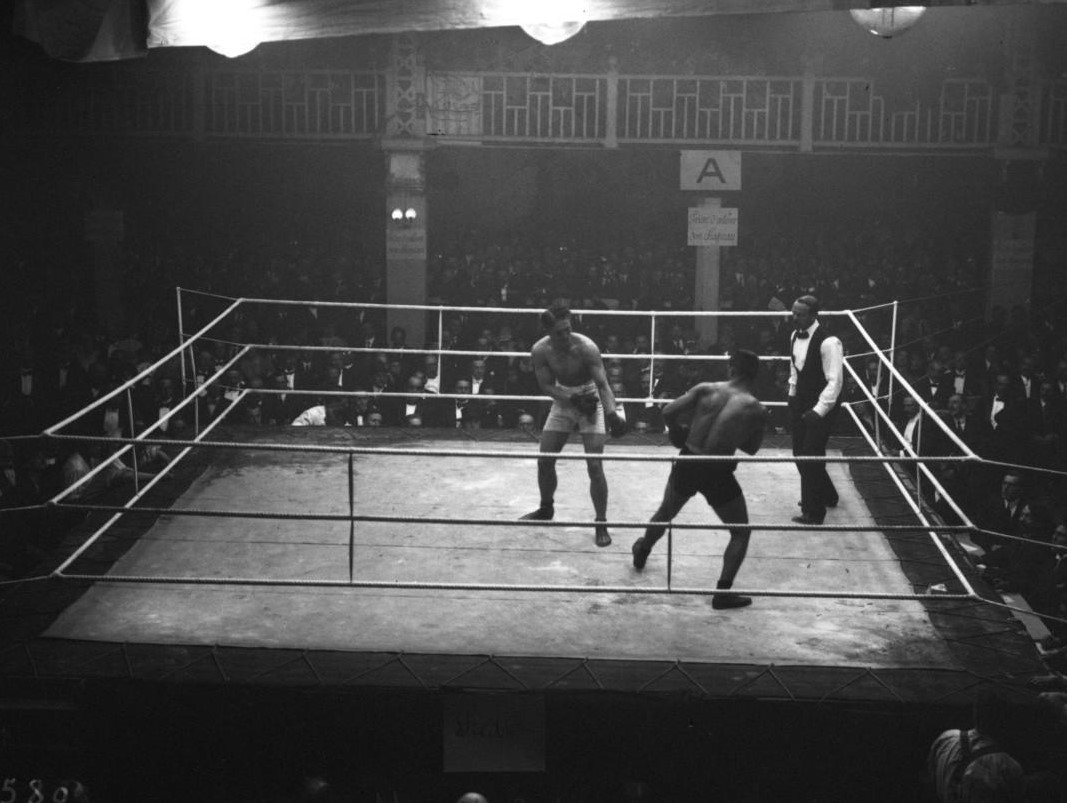
Smith (right), during his bout with Georges Carpentier

Smith made his pro debut in 1910 (the same year of the death of famed Middleweight Champion Stanley Ketchel), beating Ray Hatfield by newspaper decision over four rounds. On February 20, 1912, Smith beat future World Middleweight Title holder George Chip on points over fifteen rounds in what turned out to be a heated battle. His next notable challenge was against another future Middleweight titleholder in Mike Gibbons, with whom he drew over 10 rounds as decided by newspaper reporters. On October 11, 1913, Smith faced yet another future champion in French fighter and future Light Heavyweight champ Georges Carpentier. Despite a late rally by Smith, Carpentier used his vaunted technique beat him decisively in a twenty round decision.

== Australian World Middleweight Champion ==
Earning his nickname as the "Bayonne Globetrotter", Smith faced Eddie McGoorty in Australia, losing an extremely unpopular decision over twenty rounds. The decision was so despised that it was later rescinded, and Smith was awarded the Australian version of the World Middleweight Title. Smith would lose the title to Australian pugilist Mick King on November 28, 1914 but regained it just one month later on December 26 of the same year. On January 23, 1915 Smith faced famed Australian fighter Les Darcy, beating him by disqualification after Darcy's handlers threw in a towel in protest to what they claimed was a low blow by Smith. Smith thus maintained his status as Australian champion, but Darcy would later exact his revenge, beating Smith via disqualification for repeated low blows.

== Later career ==
During his career, Smith had a tremendous rivalry with the legendary Harry Greb; with the two squaring of a total of seven times. Although he lost six times and drew once against the "Pittsburgh Windmill", Greb had great respect for Smith; stating "My toughest fight was with Jeff Smith. (Tommy) Gibbons gave me a hard battle, but nothing like the Smith beating." Also notable was his tetra-logy of fights with Mike Gibbons, resulting in one win and three losses. Near the end of his career, Smith faced the fabled Gene Tunney; losing a clear decision to the much larger "Fighting Marine" after being knocked down twice. Smith retired after being knocked out for the third time by Cuban Bobby Brown on November 18, 1927.

== Professional boxing record ==
All information in this section is derived from BoxRec, unless otherwise stated.

=== Official Record ===
183 fights	88 wins	12 losses
By knockout	48	3
By decision	37	8
By disqualification	3	1
Draws	3	
No contests	3	
Newspaper decisions/draws	77	

All newspaper decisions are officially regarded as "no decision" bouts and are not counted in the win/loss/draw column.

No.	Result	Record	Opponent	Type	Round	Date	Age	Location	Notes
183	Loss	88–12–3 (80)	Cuban Bobby Brown	TKO	2 (10)	Nov 18, 1927	36 years, 209 days	Auditorium, Norristown, Pennsylvania, U.S.	
182	Loss	88–11–3 (80)	George Manley	PTS	10	Jul 15, 1927	36 years, 83 days	Stockyards Stadium, Denver, Colorado, U.S.	
181	Loss	88–10–3 (80)	George Manley	PTS	10	Jun 11, 1927	36 years, 49 days	Olympic Auditorium, Denver, Colorado, U.S.	
180	Loss	88–9–3 (80)	Fred Cullen	PTS	10	Apr 18, 1927	35 years, 360 days	El Paso, Texas, U.S.	
179	Win	88–8–3 (80)	Terry Roberts	KO	5 (10)	Mar 30, 1927	35 years, 341 days	Charlotte, North Carolina, U.S.	
178	NC	87–8–3 (80)	Henry Lamar	NC	7 (10)	Mar 22, 1927	35 years, 333 days	Auditorium, Washington, D.C., U.S.	Boxing was not legally permitted in D.C.
177	Win	87–8–3 (79)	Chuck Burns	PTS	15	Mar 11, 1927	35 years, 322 days	Auditorium, Savannah, Georgia, U.S.	
176	Win	86–8–3 (79)	Lew Chester	NWS	10	Feb 8, 1927	35 years, 291 days	Paterson, New Jersey, U.S.	
175	Loss	86–8–3 (78)	Murray Gitlitz	TKO	5 (10)	Nov 15, 1926	35 years, 206 days	Arena, Philadelphia, Pennsylvania, U.S.	
174	Win	86–7–3 (78)	Homer Robertson	NWS	12	Sep 20, 1926	35 years, 150 days	Exposition Building, Portland, Maine, U.S.	
173	Win	86–7–3 (77)	Jack Palmer	NWS	8	Jul 26, 1926	35 years, 94 days	Waltz Dream Arena, Atlantic City, New Jersey, U.S.	
172	Loss	86–7–3 (76)	Tony Marullo	KO	11 (15)	Aug 3, 1925	34 years, 102 days	Coliseum Arena, New Orleans, Louisiana, U.S.	
171	NC	86–6–3 (76)	Bob Lawson	NC	5 (12)	Jun 19, 1925	34 years, 57 days	Exposition Building, Portland, Maine, U.S.	
170	Win	86–6–3 (75)	Buck Aston	UD	8	Mar 9, 1925	33 years, 320 days	Fulton Opera House, Lancaster, Pennsylvania, U.S.	
169	Loss	85–6–3 (75)	Gene Tunney	NWS	15	Dec 8, 1924	33 years, 229 days	Coliseum Arena, New Orleans, Louisiana, U.S.	
168	Win	85–6–3 (74)	Frank Moody	NWS	12	Nov 11, 1924	33 years, 202 days	Exposition Building, Portland, Maine, U.S.	
167	Win	85–6–3 (73)	Happy Howard	PTS	15	Oct 27, 1924	33 years, 187 days	Tulane Arena, New Orleans, Louisiana, U.S.	
166	Win	84–6–3 (73)	Billy Britton	NWS	10	Oct 20, 1924	33 years, 180 days	Tomlinson Hall, Indianapolis, Indiana, U.S.	
165	Draw	84–6–3 (72)	Ray Pelkey	PTS	4	Oct 1, 1924	33 years, 161 days	Auditorium, Oakland, California, U.S.	
164	Win	84–6–2 (72)	Tony Marullo	PTS	15	Sep 11, 1924	33 years, 141 days	Tulane Arena, New Orleans, Louisiana, U.S.	
163	Win	83–6–2 (72)	Ray Neuman	DQ	3 (10)	Jul 29, 1924	33 years, 97 days	Henderson's Bowl, New York City, New York, U.S.	
162	Win	82–6–2 (72)	George Robinson	TKO	4 (12)	Jun 30, 1924	33 years, 68 days	Stadium, Troy, New York, U.S.	
161	Win	81–6–2 (72)	Joe Lohman	NWS	10	May 30, 1924	33 years, 37 days	Tomlinson Hall, Indianapolis, Indiana, U.S.	
160	Win	81–6–2 (71)	George Samson	KO	2 (10)	May 23, 1924	33 years, 30 days	R. and P. Park, Mount Holly, New Jersey, U.S.	
159	Win	80–6–2 (71)	Ray Neuman	NWS	12	Apr 28, 1924	33 years, 5 days	Arena, Trenton, New Jersey, U.S.	
158	Win	80–6–2 (70)	Joe Lohman	KO	9 (10)	Mar 7, 1924	32 years, 319 days	Auditorium, Atlanta, New Jersey, U.S.	
157	Win	79–6–2 (70)	Jamaica Kid	PTS	12	Feb 18, 1924	32 years, 301 days	Lenox A.C., New York City, New York, U.S.	
156	Win	78–6–2 (70)	Young Fisher	KO	10 (12)	Nov 12, 1923	32 years, 203 days	Exposition Building, Portland, Maine, U.S.	
155	Win	77–6–2 (70)	Chuck Wiggins	PTS	15	Oct 1, 1923	32 years, 161 days	Tulane Arena, New Orleans, Louisiana, U.S.	
154	Win	76–6–2 (70)	Lee Anderson	PTS	15	Sep 24, 1923	32 years, 154 days	Ciudad Juarez, Chihuahua, Mexico	
153	Win	75–6–2 (70)	Andy Kid Palmer	NWS	8	Aug 13, 1923	32 years, 112 days	Shibe Park, Philadelphia, Pennsylvania, U.S.	
152	Win	75–6–2 (69)	Tommy Loughran	NWS	8	Jun 18, 1923	32 years, 56 days	Shibe Park, Philadelphia, Pennsylvania, U.S.	
151	Win	75–6–2 (68)	Jamaica Kid	NWS	12	May 22, 1923	32 years, 29 days	Exposition Building, Portland, Maine, U.S.	
150	Win	75–6–2 (67)	Harry Krohn	TKO	6 (15)	May 10, 1923	32 years, 17 days	Halifax, Nova Scotia, Canada	Also reported as occurring May 15
149	Win	74–6–2 (67)	Dan O'Dowd	NWS	12	Apr 4, 1923	31 years, 346 days	Lewiston, Maine, U.S.	
148	Win	74–6–2 (66)	Bob Roper	NWS	12	Mar 20, 1923	31 years, 331 days	Exposition Building, Portland, Maine, U.S.	
147	Loss	74–6–2 (65)	Tommy Loughran	NWS	10	Mar 8, 1923	31 years, 319 days	109th Infantry Armory, Scranton, Pennsylvania, U.S.	
146	Win	74–6–2 (64)	Jimmy Darcy	NWS	12	Mar 2, 1923	31 years, 313 days	Oak Hill Auditorium, Youngstown, Ohio, U.S.	
145	Win	74–6–2 (63)	Jamaica Kid	PTS	10	Feb 26, 1923	31 years, 309 days	Broadway Auditorium, Buffalo, New York, U.S.	
144	Win	73–6–2 (63)	Jamaica Kid	NWS	12	Feb 22, 1923	31 years, 305 days	Exposition Building, Portland, Maine, U.S.	
143	Win	73–6–2 (62)	Eddie Tremblay	KO	4 (6)	Jan 9, 1923	31 years, 261 days	Exposition Building, Portland, Maine, U.S.	
142	Win	72–6–2 (62)	Fay Keiser	PTS	12	Jan 1, 1923	31 years, 253 days	Lakeside Park Pavilion, Dayton, Ohio, U.S.	
141	Win	71–6–2 (62)	Billy Britton	NWS	12	Dec 29, 1922	31 years, 250 days	Memorial Hall, Atchison, Kansas, U.S.	
140	Win	71–6–2 (61)	Clay Turner	KO	2 (12)	Dec 18, 1922	31 years, 239 days	Canton Auditorium, Canton, Ohio, U.S.	
139	Win	70–6–2 (61)	Martin Burke	PTS	15	Dec 1, 1922	31 years, 222 days	Louisiana Auditorium, New Orleans, Louisiana, U.S.	
138	Win	69–6–2 (61)	Bob Roper	PTS	15	Oct 18, 1922	31 years, 178 days	Coliseum Arena, New Orleans, Louisiana, U.S.	
137	Win	68–6–2 (61)	George Robinson	NWS	12	Oct 12, 1922	31 years, 172 days	Exposition Building, Portland, Oregon, U.S.	
136	Win	68–6–2 (60)	Harry Krohn	NWS	12	Oct 6, 1922	31 years, 166 days	Erie, Pennsylvania, U.S.	
135	Win	68–6–2 (59)	Jackie Clark	PTS	12	Sep 4, 1922	31 years, 134 days	Convention Hall, Tulsa, Oklahoma, U.S.	
134	Win	67–6–2 (59)	Jamaica Kid	PTS	12	Aug 21, 1922	31 years, 120 days	McCabe Arena, Dayton, Ohio, U.S.	
133	Win	66–6–2 (59)	Ray Benson	KO	1 (10)	Jul 26, 1922	31 years, 94 days	Margolis AC, Averne, New York City, New York, U.S.	
132	Win	65–6–2 (59)	Bob Moha	NWS	10	Jun 19, 1922	31 years, 57 days	Empress Theater, Milwaukee, Wisconsin, U.S.	
131	Win	65–6–2 (58)	Glenn Clickner	KO	5 (12)	May 22, 1922	31 years, 29 days	Convention Hall, Tulsa, Oklahoma, U.S.	
130	Win	64–6–2 (58)	Pat McCarthy	PTS	12	May 15, 1922	31 years, 22 days	National A.C., Providence, Rhode Island, U.S.	
129	Win	63–6–2 (58)	Otto Hughes	KO	4 (10)	May 10, 1922	31 years, 17 days	Washington Park, Indianapolis, Indiana, U.S.	
128	Win	62–6–2 (58)	Bob Moha	TKO	7 (12)	May 3, 1922	31 years, 10 days	Oak Hill Auditorium, Youngstown, Ohio, U.S.	
127	Win	61–6–2 (58)	Reuben Jaffe	TKO	2 (12)	Feb 27, 1922	30 years, 310 days	Bolton Hall, Troy, New York, U.S.	
126	Loss	60–6–2 (58)	Harry Greb	NWS	10	Feb 20, 1922	30 years, 303 days	Ohio National Guard Armory, Cincinnati, Ohio, U.S.	
125	Win	60–6–2 (57)	Frankie Fleming	KO	6 (12)	Jan 16, 1922	30 years, 268 days	Staten Island Coliseum, New York City, New York, U.S.	
124	Win	59–6–2 (57)	Andy Kid Palmer	PTS	15	Jan 4, 1922	30 years, 256 days	Convention Hall, Tulsa, Oklahoma, U.S.	
123	Loss	58–6–2 (57)	Mike McTigue	PTS	15	Dec 1, 1921	30 years, 222 days	Madison Square Garden, New York City, New York, U.S.	
122	Win	58–5–2 (57)	Joe White	KO	2 (10)	Nov 24, 1921	30 years, 215 days	St. Denis Theatre, Montreal, Quebec, Canada	
121	Win	57–5–2 (57)	Jimmy Darcy	PTS	15	Oct 7, 1921	30 years, 167 days	Tulane Arena, New Orleans, Louisiana, U.S.	
120	Loss	56–5–2 (57)	Mike Gibbons	NWS	12	Aug 9, 1921	30 years, 108 days	Armory A.A., Jersey City, New Jersey, U.S.	
119	Win	56–5–2 (56)	Harry Foley	PTS	15	Aug 1, 1921	30 years, 100 days	Pilsbury Winter Gardens, New Orleans, Louisiana, U.S.	
118	Draw	55–5–2 (56)	Harry Greb	PTS	15	May 20, 1921	30 years, 27 days	Louisiana Auditorium, New Orleans, Louisiana, U.S.	
117	Win	55–5–1 (56)	Pat McCarthy	PTS	10	Apr 4, 1921	29 years, 346 days	Worcester, Massachusetts, U.S.	
116	Win	54–5–1 (56)	Cliff Jordan	PTS	10	Mar 4, 1921	29 years, 315 days	Worcester, Massachusetts, U.S.	
115	Loss	53–5–1 (56)	Harry Greb	PTS	10	Feb 25, 1921	29 years, 308 days	Mechanics Building, Boston, Massachusetts, U.S.	
114	Loss	53–4–1 (56)	Harry Greb	NWS	10	Dec 25, 1920	29 years, 246 days	Motor Square Garden, Pittsburgh, Pennsylvania, U.S.	
113	Win	53–4–1 (55)	George Robinson	NWS	10	Nov 29, 1920	29 years, 220 days	Monument National, Montreal, Quebec, Canada	
112	Loss	53–4–1 (54)	Mike O'Dowd	SD	15	Nov 9, 1920	29 years, 200 days	Madison Square Garden, New York City, New York, U.S.	
111	Win	53–3–1 (54)	Jamaica Kid	NWS	12	Oct 25, 1920	29 years, 185 days	Arena, Trenton, New Jersey, U.S.	
110	Win	53–3–1 (53)	Joe White	KO	4 (15)	Oct 7, 1920	29 years, 167 days	Halifax, Nova Scotia, Canada	
109	Win	52–3–1 (53)	George Robinson	PTS	15	Sep 1, 1920	29 years, 131 days	Halifax, Nova Scotia, Canada	
108	Win	51–3–1 (53)	Frank Carbone	NWS	12	Aug 24, 1920	29 years, 123 days	Idora Park, Youngstown, Ohio, U.S.	
107	Win	51–3–1 (52)	Mike McTigue	PTS	15	Aug 10, 1920	29 years, 109 days	Armouries, Halifax, Nova Scotia, Canada	
106	Win	50–3–1 (52)	Johnny Howard	NWS	12	Jul 12, 1920	29 years, 80 days	Lotus A.C., Perth Amboy, New Jersey, U.S.	
105	Win	50–3–1 (51)	George Robinson	NWS	12	Jul 5, 1920	29 years, 73 days	Lewiston Athletic Park, Lewiston, Maine, U.S.	
104	Win	50–3–1 (50)	Ercole de Balzac	KO	3 (15)	May 8, 1920	29 years, 15 days	Cirque de Paris, Paris, Paris, France	
103	Win	49–3–1 (50)	Bandsman Dick Rice	KO	2 (20)	Apr 22, 1920	28 years, 365 days	Holborn Stadium, Holborn, London, England, U.K.	
102	Win	48–3–1 (50)	Bob Scanlon	KO	2 (10)	Apr 7, 1920	28 years, 350 days	Salle Wagram, Paris, Paris, France	
101	Win	47–3–1 (50)	Jef DePaus	TKO	2 (10)	Mar 5, 1920	28 years, 317 days	Cirque de Paris, Paris, Paris, France	
100	Win	46–3–1 (50)	Young Herman Miller	NWS	6	Jan 23, 1920	28 years, 275 days	Orpheum Theatre, York, Maryland, U.S.	
99	Win	46–3–1 (49)	Young Jack Johnson	NWS	12	Jan 7, 1920	28 years, 259 days	Lewiston, Maine, U.S.	
98	Win	46–3–1 (48)	Art Magirl	TKO	3 (6)	Jan 1, 1920	28 years, 253 days	National A.C., Philadelphia, Pennsylvania, U.S.	
97	Win	45–3–1 (48)	Jack Coyne	KO	2 (?)	Dec 29, 1919	28 years, 250 days	4th Regiment Armory, Jersey City, New Jersey, U.S.	
96	Draw	44–3–1 (48)	Jamaica Kid	NWS	10	Dec 11, 1919	28 years, 232 days	State Armory, Binghamton, New York, U.S.	
95	NC	44–3–1 (47)	Jack McCarron	NC	6 (12)	Nov 21, 1919	28 years, 212 days	Coliseum, Toledo, Ohio, U.S.	No contest for poor performance from both
94	Win	44–3–1 (46)	George Samson	NWS	8	Nov 17, 1919	28 years, 208 days	Trenton A.C., Trenton, New Jersey, U.S.	
93	Win	44–3–1 (45)	Jamaica Kid	NWS	8	Nov 13, 1919	28 years, 204 days	Atlantic City S.C., Atlantic City, New Jersey, U.S.	
92	Win	44–3–1 (44)	Frank Carbone	NWS	10	Nov 6, 1919	28 years, 197 days	Town Hall, Scranton, Pennsylvania, U.S.	
91	Win	44–3–1 (43)	Frank Carbone	NWS	8	Oct 21, 1919	28 years, 181 days	Schuetzen Park, Bayonne, New Jersey, U.S.	
90	Win	44–3–1 (42)	Frank Mayo	KO	1 (8)	Oct 13, 1919	28 years, 173 days	2nd Regiment Armory, Trenton, New Jersey, U.S.	
89	Win	43–3–1 (42)	Jackie Clark	NWS	10	Oct 7, 1919	28 years, 167 days	Arena, Syracuse, New York, U.S.	
88	Loss	43–3–1 (41)	Harry Greb	NWS	12	Sep 1, 1919	28 years, 131 days	Idora Park, Youngstown, Ohio, U.S.	
87	Win	43–3–1 (40)	Johnny Howard	NWS	8	Aug 12, 1919	28 years, 111 days	Bayonne Pavillion, Bayonne, New Jersey, U.S.	
86	Loss	43–3–1 (39)	Panama Joe Gans	NWS	8	Jul 8, 1919	28 years, 76 days	Atlantic City S.C., Atlantic City, New Jersey, U.S.	
85	Win	43–3–1 (38)	Mike Gibbons	NWS	10	Jul 4, 1919	28 years, 72 days	Association Park, Kansas City, Missouri, U.S.	
84	Win	43–3–1 (37)	Eugene Brosseau	NWS	10	Jun 24, 1919	28 years, 62 days	National Grounds, Montreal, Quebec, Canada	
83	Win	43–3–1 (36)	Silent Martin	NWS	8	May 16, 1919	28 years, 23 days	Bayonne Pavillion, Bayonne, New Jersey, U.S.	
82	Win	43–3–1 (35)	George Chip	PTS	12	May 9, 1919	28 years, 16 days	Albaugh Theater, Baltimore, Maryland, U.S.	
81	Win	42–3–1 (35)	Frank Carbone	NWS	8	Mar 27, 1919	27 years, 338 days	Atlantic City S.C., Atlantic City, New Jersey, U.S.	
80	Win	42–3–1 (34)	Jim Booker	KO	2 (8)	Mar 13, 1919	27 years, 324 days	Atlantic City S.C., Atlantic City, New Jersey, U.S.	
79	Win	41–3–1 (34)	Johnny Howard	NWS	8	Feb 3, 1919	27 years, 286 days	Grand View Auditorium, Jersey City, New Jersey, U.S.	
78	Win	41–3–1 (33)	Billy Kramer	KO	3 (6)	Jan 1, 1919	27 years, 253 days	National A.C., Philadelphia, Pennsylvania, U.S.	
77	Win	40–3–1 (33)	Jack Hanlon	TKO	1 (6)	Nov 30, 1918	27 years, 221 days	National A.C., Philadelphia, Pennsylvania, U.S.	
76	Loss	39–3–1 (33)	Johnny Howard	NWS	8	Aug 23, 1918	27 years, 122 days	Ballpark, Jersey City, New Jersey, U.S.	
75	Draw	39–3–1 (32)	Leo Florian Hauck	NWS	6	Jul 4, 1918	27 years, 72 days	Erne's Open Air Arena, Lancaster, Pennsylvania, U.S.	
74	Win	39–3–1 (31)	George Robinson	PTS	12	May 3, 1918	27 years, 10 days	Commercial A.C., Boston, Massachusetts, U.S.	
73	Win	38–3–1 (31)	Kid Sheeler	KO	1 (15)	Dec 20, 1917	26 years, 241 days	Maryland A.C., Ardmore, Maryland, U.S.	
72	Win	37–3–1 (31)	Mike McTigue	NWS	10	Nov 1, 1917	26 years, 192 days	Clermont Avenue Rink, New York City, New York, U.S.	
71	Loss	37–3–1 (30)	Harry Greb	NWS	10	Sep 11, 1917	26 years, 141 days	Auditorium, Milwaukee, Wisconsin, U.S.	
70	Win	37–3–1 (29)	Zulu Kid	PTS	15	Jul 21, 1917	26 years, 89 days	Oriole Park, Baltimore, Maryland, U.S.	
69	Win	36–3–1 (29)	Len Rowlands	PTS	15	Jun 18, 1917	26 years, 56 days	Elmwood Arena, Elmwood Place, Ohio, U.S.	
68	Loss	35–3–1 (29)	Harry Greb	NWS	10	May 19, 1917	26 years, 26 days	Broadway Auditorium, Buffalo, New York, U.S.	
67	Win	35–3–1 (28)	Young Ahearn	KO	5 (20)	Apr 23, 1917	26 years, 0 days	Louisiana Auditorium, New Orleans, Louisiana, U.S.	
66	Win	34–3–1 (28)	Joe Borrell	NWS	6	Feb 2, 1917	25 years, 285 days	Cambria A.C., Philadelphia, Pennsylvania, U.S.	
65	Win	34–3–1 (27)	Leo Lavin	TKO	4 (10)	Jan 30, 1917	25 years, 282 days	German Hall, Albany, New York, U.S.	
64	Loss	33–3–1 (27)	Jackie Clark	NWS	10	Jan 25, 1917	25 years, 277 days	Grand Opera House, Herkimer, New York, U.S.	
63	Win	33–3–1 (26)	Frank Mantell	PTS	15	Jan 1, 1917	25 years, 253 days	Monumental Theatre, Baltimore, Maryland, U.S.	
62	Win	32–3–1 (26)	Joe Eagan	PTS	12	Dec 12, 1916	25 years, 233 days	Arena (Armory A.A.), Boston, Massachusetts, U.S.	
61	Win	31–3–1 (26)	Kid Henry	TKO	7 (10)	Nov 30, 1916	25 years, 221 days	German Hall, Albany, New York, U.S.	
60	Win	30–3–1 (26)	Joe Herrick	KO	3 (10)	Nov 10, 1916	25 years, 201 days	Auditorium, Milwaukee, Wisconsin, U.S.	
59	Win	29–3–1 (26)	Herman Miller	KO	3 (10)	Nov 6, 1916	25 years, 197 days	Albaugh's Theater, Baltimore, Maryland, U.S.	
58	Loss	28–3–1 (26)	Jack McCarron	NWS	10	Jul 4, 1916	25 years, 72 days	Allentown, Pennsylvania, U.S.	
57	Loss	28–3–1 (25)	Gus Christie	NWS	10	Jun 23, 1916	25 years, 61 days	Flower City A.C., Rochester, New York, U.S.	
56	Win	28–3–1 (24)	Zulu Kid	NWS	10	Mar 28, 1916	24 years, 340 days	German Hall, Albany, New York, U.S.	
55	Loss	28–3–1 (23)	Mike Gibbons	NWS	10	Mar 17, 1916	24 years, 329 days	Auditorium, Saint Paul, Minnesota, U.S.	World middleweight title claim at stake; (via KO only)
54	Win	28–3–1 (22)	George Chip	DQ	7 (12)	Dec 7, 1915	24 years, 228 days	Hippodrome, Boston, Massachusetts, U.S.	
53	Loss	27–3–1 (22)	Les Darcy	DQ	2 (20)	May 22, 1915	24 years, 29 days	Sydney Stadium, Sydney, New South Wales, Australia	Lost world middleweight title (Australian version)
52	Win	27–2–1 (22)	Harold Hardwick	PTS	20	May 1, 1915	24 years, 8 days	Sydney Stadium, Sydney, New South Wales, Australia	
51	Win	26–2–1 (22)	Mick King	PTS	20	Feb 20, 1915	23 years, 303 days	West Melbourne Stadium, Melbourne, Victoria, Australia	Retained world middleweight title (Australian version)
50	Win	25–2–1 (22)	Les Darcy	DQ	5 (20)	Jan 23, 1915	23 years, 275 days	Sydney Stadium, Sydney, New South Wales, Australia	Retained world middleweight title (Australian version)
49	Win	24–2–1 (22)	Mick King	PTS	20	Dec 26, 1914	23 years, 247 days	Sydney Stadium, Sydney, New South Wales, Australia	Won world middleweight title (Australian version)
48	Loss	23–2–1 (22)	Mick King	PTS	20	Nov 28, 1914	23 years, 219 days	Sydney Stadium, Sydney, New South Wales, Australia	Lost world middleweight title (Australian version)
47	Win	23–1–1 (22)	Jimmy Clabby	PTS	20	Jun 6, 1914	23 years, 44 days	Sydney Stadium, Sydney, New South Wales, Australia	Retained world middleweight title (Australian version)
46	Win	22–1–1 (22)	Pat Bradley	KO	16 (20)	Apr 13, 1914	22 years, 355 days	Sydney Stadium, Sydney, New South Wales, Australia	Retained world middleweight title (Australian version)
45	Win	21–1–1 (22)	Eddie McGoorty	PTS	20	Mar 14, 1914	22 years, 325 days	Sydney Stadium, Sydney, New South Wales, Australia	Won world middleweight title (Australian version)
44	Win	20–1–1 (22)	Georges Bernard	PTS	20	Nov 15, 1913	22 years, 206 days	Luna Park Arena, Paris, Paris, France	
43	Loss	19–1–1 (22)	Georges Carpentier	PTS	20	Oct 11, 1913	22 years, 171 days	Luna Park Arena, Paris, Paris, France	
42	Win	19–0–1 (22)	Adrien Hogan	TKO	11 (20)	Apr 2, 1913	21 years, 344 days	Cirque de Paris, Paris, Paris, France	
41	Draw	18–0–1 (22)	Frank Mantell	PTS	20	Feb 19, 1913	21 years, 302 days	Salle Wagram, Paris, Paris, France	
40	Win	18–0 (22)	Georges Bernard	PTS	10	Jan 25, 1913	21 years, 277 days	Wonderland, Paris, Paris, France	
39	Win	17–0 (22)	Jim O'Brien	KO	3 (10)	Dec 21, 1912	21 years, 242 days	Wonderland, Paris, Paris, France	
38	Win	16–0 (22)	Harry Mansfield	RTD	6 (10)	Nov 16, 1912	21 years, 207 days	Wonderland, Paris, Paris, France	
37	Win	15–0 (22)	Tom Leary	PTS	10	Oct 30, 1912	21 years, 190 days	Salle Wagram, Paris, Paris, France	
36	Win	14–0 (22)	Larry English	NWS	10	Sep 23, 1912	21 years, 153 days	German Hall, Albany, New York, U.S.	
35	Win	14–0 (21)	Jimmy Howard	NWS	10	Jun 25, 1912	21 years, 63 days	Atlas A.A., Rockaway Beach, New York City, New York, U.S.	
34	Win	14–0 (20)	Mike Glover	NWS	10	Jun 6, 1912	21 years, 44 days	Brown's Gym, New York City, New York, U.S.	
33	Loss	14–0 (19)	Mike Gibbons	NWS	10	Apr 11, 1912	20 years, 354 days	New Amsterdam Opera House, New York City, New York, U.S.	
32	Win	14–0 (18)	Billy West	NWS	10	Feb 27, 1912	20 years, 310 days	Brown's Gym, New York City, New York, U.S.	
31	Loss	14–0 (17)	Eddie Palmer	NWS	6	Feb 26, 1912	20 years, 309 days	American A.C., Philadelphia, Pennsylvania, U.S.	
30	Win	14–0 (16)	George Chip	PTS	15	Feb 20, 1912	20 years, 303 days	Rhode Island A.C., Thornton, Rhode Island, U.S.	
29	Win	13–0 (16)	Young Loughrey	TKO	9 (10)	Feb 1, 1912	20 years, 284 days	New Amsterdam Opera House, New York City, New York, U.S.	
28	Win	12–0 (16)	Ted Nelson	KO	4 (10)	Oct 24, 1911	20 years, 184 days	German Hall, Albany, New York, U.S.	
27	Win	11–0 (16)	Willie Lewis	NWS	10	Oct 12, 1911	20 years, 172 days	New Amsterdam Opera House, New York City, New York, U.S.	
26	Loss	11–0 (15)	Jack Denning	NWS	10	Aug 29, 1911	20 years, 128 days	Brown's Gym A.A., Far Rockaway, New York City, New York, U.S.	
25	Win	11–0 (14)	Jimmy Clabby	NWS	10	Jun 22, 1911	20 years, 60 days	New Amsterdam Opera House, New York City, New York, U.S.	
24	Loss	11–0 (13)	Dick Nelson	NWS	10	May 16, 1911	20 years, 23 days	Brown's Gym, New York City, New York, U.S.	
23	Win	11–0 (12)	Al McCloskey	KO	2 (4)	May 1, 1911	20 years, 8 days	Lotus A.C., Perth Amboy, New Jersey, U.S.	
22	Loss	10–0 (12)	Paddy Lavin	NWS	10	Apr 18, 1911	19 years, 360 days	Brown's Gym, New York City, New York, U.S.	
21	Win	10–0 (11)	Johnny Carroll	NWS	10	Mar 28, 1911	19 years, 339 days	Brown's Gym, New York City, New York, U.S.	
20	Loss	10–0 (10)	Kid Henry	NWS	10	Feb 14, 1911	19 years, 297 days	German Hall, Albany, New York, U.S.	
19	Win	10–0 (9)	Paddy Murray	NWS	4	Feb 13, 1911	19 years, 296 days	Colin A.C., New York City, New York, U.S.	
18	Win	10–0 (8)	Jim Heywood	KO	2 (10)	Feb 2, 1911	19 years, 285 days	New Amsterdam Opera House, National S.C., New York City, New York, U.S.	
17	Win	9–0 (8)	Charley Lawrence	NWS	4	Jan 30, 1911	19 years, 282 days	Central Institute, Newark, New Jersey, U.S.	
16	Win	9–0 (7)	Charles Sieger	TKO	2 (10)	Jan 19, 1911	19 years, 271 days	New Amsterdam Opera House, National S.C., New York City, New York, U.S.	
15	Win	8–0 (7)	Young Rector	TKO	7 (10)	Jan 5, 1911	19 years, 257 days	New Amsterdam Opera House, National S.C., New York City, New York, U.S.	
14	Loss	7–0 (7)	Jack Denning	NWS	6	Dec 23, 1910	19 years, 244 days	New Amsterdam Opera House, National S.C., New York City, New York, U.S.	
13	Win	7–0 (6)	Sammy Delmont	NWS	4	Dec 10, 1910	19 years, 231 days	Bayonne, New Jersey, U.S.	
12	Win	7–0 (5)	Jack Wade	KO	1 (4)	Dec 2, 1910	19 years, 223 days	New Amsterdam Opera House, National S.C., New York City, New York, U.S.	
11	Win	6–0 (5)	Bill Lynch	KO	2 (4)	Nov 25, 1910	19 years, 216 days	New Amsterdam Opera House, New York City, New York, U.S.	
10	Win	5–0 (5)	Battling Larry Ryan	NWS	6	Nov 23, 1910	19 years, 214 days	Sharkey A.C., New York City, New York, U.S.	
9	Loss	5–0 (4)	Ray Hatfield	NWS	4	Nov 7, 1910	19 years, 198 days	Central Institute, Newark, New Jersey, U.S.	
8	Win	5–0 (3)	Al Rose	KO	3 (4)	Oct 25, 1910	19 years, 185 days	Brown's Gym, New York City, New York, U.S.	
7	Win	4–0 (3)	Jack Zinn	KO	1 (4)	Oct 25, 1910	19 years, 185 days	Brown's Gym, New York City, New York, U.S.	
6	Win	3–0 (3)	Ben Douglas	NWS	4	Aug 22, 1910	19 years, 121 days	Central Institute, Newark, New Jersey, U.S.	
5	Win	3–0 (2)	Young Joe Grim	KO	4 (4)	Aug 4, 1910	19 years, 103 days	Long Acre A.C., New York City, New York, U.S.	
4	Win	2–0 (2)	Ray Hatfield	NWS	4	Jul 11, 1910	19 years, 79 days	Krueger Auditorium, Newark, New Jersey, U.S.	
3	Win	2–0 (1)	Ray Hatfield	KO	3 (4)	May 14, 1910	19 years, 21 days	Central Institute, Newark, New Jersey, U.S.	
2	Win	1–0 (1)	Tony Bender	PTS	4	Apr 18, 1910	18 years, 360 days	Central Institute, Newark, New Jersey, U.S.	
1	Win	0–0 (1)	Ray Hatfield	NWS	4	Mar 7, 1910	18 years, 318 days	Central Institute, Newark, New Jersey, U.S.	

=== Unofficial record ===
183 fights	141 wins	34 losses
By knockout	48	3
By decision	90	30
By disqualification	3	1
Draws	5	
No contests	3	

Record with the inclusion of newspaper decisions in the win/loss/draw column.

No.	Result	Record	Opponent	Type	Round	Date	Age	Location	Notes
183	Loss	141–34–5 (3)	Cuban Bobby Brown	TKO	2 (10)	Nov 18, 1927	36 years, 209 days	Auditorium, Norristown, Pennsylvania, U.S.	
182	Loss	141–33–5 (3)	George Manley	PTS	10	Jul 15, 1927	36 years, 83 days	Stockyards Stadium, Denver, Colorado, U.S.	
181	Loss	141–32–5 (3)	George Manley	PTS	10	Jun 11, 1927	36 years, 49 days	Olympic Auditorium, Denver, Colorado, U.S.	
180	Loss	141–31–5 (3)	Fred Cullen	PTS	10	Apr 18, 1927	35 years, 360 days	El Paso, Texas, U.S.	
179	Win	141–30–5 (3)	Terry Roberts	KO	5 (10)	Mar 30, 1927	35 years, 341 days	Charlotte, North Carolina, U.S.	
178	NC	140–30–5 (3)	Henry Lamar	NC	7 (10)	Mar 22, 1927	35 years, 333 days	Auditorium, Washington, D.C., U.S.	Boxing was not legally permitted in D.C.
177	Win	140–30–5 (2)	Chuck Burns	PTS	15	Mar 11, 1927	35 years, 322 days	Auditorium, Savannah, Georgia, U.S.	
176	Win	139–30–5 (2)	Lew Chester	NWS	10	Feb 8, 1927	35 years, 291 days	Paterson, New Jersey, U.S.	
175	Loss	138–30–5 (2)	Murray Gitlitz	TKO	5 (10)	Nov 15, 1926	35 years, 206 days	Arena, Philadelphia, Pennsylvania, U.S.	
174	Win	138–29–5 (2)	Homer Robertson	NWS	12	Sep 20, 1926	35 years, 150 days	Exposition Building, Portland, Maine, U.S.	
173	Win	137–29–5 (2)	Jack Palmer	NWS	8	Jul 26, 1926	35 years, 94 days	Waltz Dream Arena, Atlantic City, New Jersey, U.S.	
172	Loss	136–29–5 (2)	Tony Marullo	KO	11 (15)	Aug 3, 1925	34 years, 102 days	Coliseum Arena, New Orleans, Louisiana, U.S.	
171	NC	136–28–5 (2)	Bob Lawson	NC	5 (12)	Jun 19, 1925	34 years, 57 days	Exposition Building, Portland, Maine, U.S.	
170	Win	136–28–5 (1)	Buck Aston	UD	8	Mar 9, 1925	33 years, 320 days	Fulton Opera House, Lancaster, Pennsylvania, U.S.	
169	Loss	135–28–5 (1)	Gene Tunney	NWS	15	Dec 8, 1924	33 years, 229 days	Coliseum Arena, New Orleans, Louisiana, U.S.	
168	Win	135–27–5 (1)	Frank Moody	NWS	12	Nov 11, 1924	33 years, 202 days	Exposition Building, Portland, Maine, U.S.	
167	Win	134–27–5 (1)	Happy Howard	PTS	15	Oct 27, 1924	33 years, 187 days	Tulane Arena, New Orleans, Louisiana, U.S.	
166	Win	133–27–5 (1)	Billy Britton	NWS	10	Oct 20, 1924	33 years, 180 days	Tomlinson Hall, Indianapolis, Indiana, U.S.	
165	Draw	132–27–5 (1)	Ray Pelkey	PTS	4	Oct 1, 1924	33 years, 161 days	Auditorium, Oakland, California, U.S.	
164	Win	132–27–4 (1)	Tony Marullo	PTS	15	Sep 11, 1924	33 years, 141 days	Tulane Arena, New Orleans, Louisiana, U.S.	
163	Win	131–27–4 (1)	Ray Neuman	DQ	3 (10)	Jul 29, 1924	33 years, 97 days	Henderson's Bowl, New York City, New York, U.S.	
162	Win	130–27–4 (1)	George Robinson	TKO	4 (12)	Jun 30, 1924	33 years, 68 days	Stadium, Troy, New York, U.S.	
161	Win	129–27–4 (1)	Joe Lohman	NWS	10	May 30, 1924	33 years, 37 days	Tomlinson Hall, Indianapolis, Indiana, U.S.	
160	Win	128–27–4 (1)	George Samson	KO	2 (10)	May 23, 1924	33 years, 30 days	R. and P. Park, Mount Holly, New Jersey, U.S.	
159	Win	127–27–4 (1)	Ray Neuman	NWS	12	Apr 28, 1924	33 years, 5 days	Arena, Trenton, New Jersey, U.S.	
158	Win	126–27–4 (1)	Joe Lohman	KO	9 (10)	Mar 7, 1924	32 years, 319 days	Auditorium, Atlanta, New Jersey, U.S.	
157	Win	125–27–4 (1)	Jamaica Kid	PTS	12	Feb 18, 1924	32 years, 301 days	Lenox A.C., New York City, New York, U.S.	
156	Win	124–27–4 (1)	Young Fisher	KO	10 (12)	Nov 12, 1923	32 years, 203 days	Exposition Building, Portland, Maine, U.S.	
155	Win	123–27–4 (1)	Chuck Wiggins	PTS	15	Oct 1, 1923	32 years, 161 days	Tulane Arena, New Orleans, Louisiana, U.S.	
154	Win	122–27–4 (1)	Lee Anderson	PTS	15	Sep 24, 1923	32 years, 154 days	Ciudad Juarez, Chihuahua, Mexico	
153	Win	121–27–4 (1)	Andy Kid Palmer	NWS	8	Aug 13, 1923	32 years, 112 days	Shibe Park, Philadelphia, Pennsylvania, U.S.	
152	Win	120–27–4 (1)	Tommy Loughran	NWS	8	Jun 18, 1923	32 years, 56 days	Shibe Park, Philadelphia, Pennsylvania, U.S.	
151	Win	119–27–4 (1)	Jamaica Kid	NWS	12	May 22, 1923	32 years, 29 days	Exposition Building, Portland, Maine, U.S.	
150	Win	118–27–4 (1)	Harry Krohn	TKO	6 (15)	May 10, 1923	32 years, 17 days	Halifax, Nova Scotia, Canada	Also reported as occurring May 15
149	Win	117–27–4 (1)	Dan O'Dowd	NWS	12	Apr 4, 1923	31 years, 346 days	Lewiston, Maine, U.S.	
148	Win	116–27–4 (1)	Bob Roper	NWS	12	Mar 20, 1923	31 years, 331 days	Exposition Building, Portland, Maine, U.S.	
147	Loss	115–27–4 (1)	Tommy Loughran	NWS	10	Mar 8, 1923	31 years, 319 days	109th Infantry Armory, Scranton, Pennsylvania, U.S.	
146	Win	115–26–4 (1)	Jimmy Darcy	NWS	12	Mar 2, 1923	31 years, 313 days	Oak Hill Auditorium, Youngstown, Ohio, U.S.	
145	Win	114–26–4 (1)	Jamaica Kid	PTS	10	Feb 26, 1923	31 years, 309 days	Broadway Auditorium, Buffalo, New York, U.S.	
144	Win	113–26–4 (1)	Jamaica Kid	NWS	12	Feb 22, 1923	31 years, 305 days	Exposition Building, Portland, Maine, U.S.	
143	Win	112–26–4 (1)	Eddie Tremblay	KO	4 (6)	Jan 9, 1923	31 years, 261 days	Exposition Building, Portland, Maine, U.S.	
142	Win	111–26–4 (1)	Fay Keiser	PTS	12	Jan 1, 1923	31 years, 253 days	Lakeside Park Pavillion, Dayton, Ohio, U.S.	
141	Win	110–26–4 (1)	Billy Britton	NWS	12	Dec 29, 1922	31 years, 250 days	Memorial Hall, Atchison, Kansas, U.S.	
140	Win	109–26–4 (1)	Clay Turner	KO	2 (12)	Dec 18, 1922	31 years, 239 days	Canton Auditorium, Canton, Ohio, U.S.	
139	Win	108–26–4 (1)	Martin Burke	PTS	15	Dec 1, 1922	31 years, 222 days	Louisiana Auditorium, New Orleans, Louisiana, U.S.	
138	Win	107–26–4 (1)	Bob Roper	PTS	15	Oct 18, 1922	31 years, 178 days	Coliseum Arena, New Orleans, Louisiana, U.S.	
137	Win	106–26–4 (1)	George Robinson	NWS	12	Oct 12, 1922	31 years, 172 days	Exposition Building, Portland, Oregon, U.S.	
136	Win	105–26–4 (1)	Harry Krohn	NWS	12	Oct 6, 1922	31 years, 166 days	Erie, Pennsylvania, U.S.	
135	Win	104–26–4 (1)	Jackie Clark	PTS	12	Sep 4, 1922	31 years, 134 days	Convention Hall, Tulsa, Oklahoma, U.S.	
134	Win	103–26–4 (1)	Jamaica Kid	PTS	12	Aug 21, 1922	31 years, 120 days	McCabe Arena, Dayton, Ohio, U.S.	
133	Win	102–26–4 (1)	Ray Benson	KO	1 (10)	Jul 26, 1922	31 years, 94 days	Margolis AC, Averne, New York City, New York, U.S.	
132	Win	101–26–4 (1)	Bob Moha	NWS	10	Jun 19, 1922	31 years, 57 days	Empress Theater, Milwaukee, Wisconsin, U.S.	
131	Win	100–26–4 (1)	Glenn Clickner	KO	5 (12)	May 22, 1922	31 years, 29 days	Convention Hall, Tulsa, Oklahoma, U.S.	
130	Win	99–26–4 (1)	Pat McCarthy	PTS	12	May 15, 1922	31 years, 22 days	National A.C., Providence, Rhode Island, U.S.	
129	Win	98–26–4 (1)	Otto Hughes	KO	4 (10)	May 10, 1922	31 years, 17 days	Washington Park, Indianapolis, Indiana, U.S.	
128	Win	97–26–4 (1)	Bob Moha	TKO	7 (12)	May 3, 1922	31 years, 10 days	Oak Hill Auditorium, Youngstown, Ohio, U.S.	
127	Win	96–26–4 (1)	Reuben Jaffe	TKO	2 (12)	Feb 27, 1922	30 years, 310 days	Bolton Hall, Troy, New York, U.S.	
126	Loss	95–26–4 (1)	Harry Greb	NWS	10	Feb 20, 1922	30 years, 303 days	Ohio National Guard Armory, Cincinnati, Ohio, U.S.	
125	Win	95–25–4 (1)	Frankie Fleming	KO	6 (12)	Jan 16, 1922	30 years, 268 days	Staten Island Coliseum, New York City, New York, U.S.	
124	Win	94–25–4 (1)	Andy Kid Palmer	PTS	15	Jan 4, 1922	30 years, 256 days	Convention Hall, Tulsa, Oklahoma, U.S.	
123	Loss	93–25–4 (1)	Mike McTigue	PTS	15	Dec 1, 1921	30 years, 222 days	Madison Square Garden, New York City, New York, U.S.	
122	Win	93–24–4 (1)	Joe White	KO	2 (10)	Nov 24, 1921	30 years, 215 days	St. Denis Theatre, Montreal, Quebec, Canada	
121	Win	92–24–4 (1)	Jimmy Darcy	PTS	15	Oct 7, 1921	30 years, 167 days	Tulane Arena, New Orleans, Louisiana, U.S.	
120	Loss	91–24–4 (1)	Mike Gibbons	NWS	12	Aug 9, 1921	30 years, 108 days	Armory A.A., Jersey City, New Jersey, U.S.	
119	Win	91–23–4 (1)	Harry Foley	PTS	15	Aug 1, 1921	30 years, 100 days	Pilsbury Winter Gardens, New Orleans, Louisiana, U.S.	
118	Draw	90–23–4 (1)	Harry Greb	PTS	15	May 20, 1921	30 years, 27 days	Louisiana Auditorium, New Orleans, Louisiana, U.S.	
117	Win	90–23–3 (1)	Pat McCarthy	PTS	10	Apr 4, 1921	29 years, 346 days	Worcester, Massachusetts, U.S.	
116	Win	89–23–3 (1)	Cliff Jordan	PTS	10	Mar 4, 1921	29 years, 315 days	Worcester, Massachusetts, U.S.	
115	Loss	88–23–3 (1)	Harry Greb	PTS	10	Feb 25, 1921	29 years, 308 days	Mechanics Building, Boston, Massachusetts, U.S.	
114	Loss	88–22–3 (1)	Harry Greb	NWS	10	Dec 25, 1920	29 years, 246 days	Motor Square Garden, Pittsburgh, Pennsylvania, U.S.	
113	Win	88–21–3 (1)	George Robinson	NWS	10	Nov 29, 1920	29 years, 220 days	Monument National, Montreal, Quebec, Canada	
112	Loss	87–21–3 (1)	Mike O'Dowd	SD	15	Nov 9, 1920	29 years, 200 days	Madison Square Garden, New York City, New York, U.S.	
111	Win	87–20–3 (1)	Jamaica Kid	NWS	12	Oct 25, 1920	29 years, 185 days	Arena, Trenton, New Jersey, U.S.	
110	Win	86–20–3 (1)	Joe White	KO	4 (15)	Oct 7, 1920	29 years, 167 days	Halifax, Nova Scotia, Canada	
109	Win	85–20–3 (1)	George Robinson	PTS	15	Sep 1, 1920	29 years, 131 days	Halifax, Nova Scotia, Canada	
108	Win	84–20–3 (1)	Frank Carbone	NWS	12	Aug 24, 1920	29 years, 123 days	Idora Park, Youngstown, Ohio, U.S.	
107	Win	83–20–3 (1)	Mike McTigue	PTS	15	Aug 10, 1920	29 years, 109 days	Armouries, Halifax, Nova Scotia, Canada	
106	Win	82–20–3 (1)	Johnny Howard	NWS	12	Jul 12, 1920	29 years, 80 days	Lotus A.C., Perth Amboy, New Jersey, U.S.	
105	Win	81–20–3 (1)	George Robinson	NWS	12	Jul 5, 1920	29 years, 73 days	Lewiston Athletic Park, Lewiston, Maine, U.S.	
104	Win	80–20–3 (1)	Ercole de Balzac	KO	3 (15)	May 8, 1920	29 years, 15 days	Cirque de Paris, Paris, Paris, France	
103	Win	79–20–3 (1)	Bandsman Dick Rice	KO	2 (20)	Apr 22, 1920	28 years, 365 days	Holborn Stadium, Holborn, London, England, U.K.	
102	Win	78–20–3 (1)	Bob Scanlon	KO	2 (10)	Apr 7, 1920	28 years, 350 days	Salle Wagram, Paris, Paris, France	
101	Win	77–20–3 (1)	Jef DePaus	TKO	2 (10)	Mar 5, 1920	28 years, 317 days	Cirque de Paris, Paris, Paris, France	
100	Win	76–20–3 (1)	Young Herman Miller	NWS	6	Jan 23, 1920	28 years, 275 days	Orpheum Theatre, York, Maryland, U.S.	
99	Win	75–20–3 (1)	Young Jack Johnson	NWS	12	Jan 7, 1920	28 years, 259 days	Lewiston, Maine, U.S.	
98	Win	74–20–3 (1)	Art Magirl	TKO	3 (6)	Jan 1, 1920	28 years, 253 days	National A.C., Philadelphia, Pennsylvania, U.S.	
97	Win	73–20–3 (1)	Jack Coyne	KO	2 (?)	Dec 29, 1919	28 years, 250 days	4th Regiment Armory, Jersey City, New Jersey, U.S.	
96	Draw	72–20–3 (1)	Jamaica Kid	NWS	10	Dec 11, 1919	28 years, 232 days	State Armory, Binghamton, New York, U.S.	
95	NC	72–20–2 (1)	Jack McCarron	NC	6 (12)	Nov 21, 1919	28 years, 212 days	Coliseum, Toledo, Ohio, U.S.	No contest for poor performance from both
94	Win	72–20–2	George Samson	NWS	8	Nov 17, 1919	28 years, 208 days	Trenton A.C., Trenton, New Jersey, U.S.	
93	Win	71–20–2	Jamaica Kid	NWS	8	Nov 13, 1919	28 years, 204 days	Atlantic City S.C., Atlantic City, New Jersey, U.S.	
92	Win	70–20–2	Frank Carbone	NWS	10	Nov 6, 1919	28 years, 197 days	Town Hall, Scranton, Pennsylvania, U.S.	
91	Win	69–20–2	Frank Carbone	NWS	8	Oct 21, 1919	28 years, 181 days	Schuetzen Park, Bayonne, New Jersey, U.S.	
90	Win	68–20–2	Frank Mayo	KO	1 (8)	Oct 13, 1919	28 years, 173 days	2nd Regiment Armory, Trenton, New Jersey, U.S.	
89	Win	67–20–2	Jackie Clark	NWS	10	Oct 7, 1919	28 years, 167 days	Arena, Syracuse, New York, U.S.	
88	Loss	66–20–2	Harry Greb	NWS	12	Sep 1, 1919	28 years, 131 days	Idora Park, Youngstown, Ohio, U.S.	
87	Win	66–19–2	Johnny Howard	NWS	8	Aug 12, 1919	28 years, 111 days	Bayonne Pavillion, Bayonne, New Jersey, U.S.	
86	Loss	65–19–2	Panama Joe Gans	NWS	8	Jul 8, 1919	28 years, 76 days	Atlantic City S.C., Atlantic City, New Jersey, U.S.	
85	Win	65–18–2	Mike Gibbons	NWS	10	Jul 4, 1919	28 years, 72 days	Association Park, Kansas City, Missouri, U.S.	
84	Win	64–18–2	Eugene Brosseau	NWS	10	Jun 24, 1919	28 years, 62 days	National Grounds, Montreal, Quebec, Canada	
83	Win	63–18–2	Silent Martin	NWS	8	May 16, 1919	28 years, 23 days	Bayonne Pavillion, Bayonne, New Jersey, U.S.	
82	Win	62–18–2	George Chip	PTS	12	May 9, 1919	28 years, 16 days	Albaugh Theater, Baltimore, Maryland, U.S.	
81	Win	61–18–2	Frank Carbone	NWS	8	Mar 27, 1919	27 years, 338 days	Atlantic City S.C., Atlantic City, New Jersey, U.S.	
80	Win	60–18–2	Jim Booker	KO	2 (8)	Mar 13, 1919	27 years, 324 days	Atlantic City S.C., Atlantic City, New Jersey, U.S.	
79	Win	59–18–2	Johnny Howard	NWS	8	Feb 3, 1919	27 years, 286 days	Grand View Auditorium, Jersey City, New Jersey, U.S.	
78	Win	58–18–2	Billy Kramer	KO	3 (6)	Jan 1, 1919	27 years, 253 days	National A.C., Philadelphia, Pennsylvania, U.S.	
77	Win	57–18–2	Jack Hanlon	TKO	1 (6)	Nov 30, 1918	27 years, 221 days	National A.C., Philadelphia, Pennsylvania, U.S.	
76	Loss	56–18–2	Johnny Howard	NWS	8	Aug 23, 1918	27 years, 122 days	Ballpark, Jersey City, New Jersey, U.S.	
75	Draw	56–17–2	Leo Florian Hauck	NWS	6	Jul 4, 1918	27 years, 72 days	Erne's Open Air Arena, Lancaster, Pennsylvania, U.S.	
74	Win	56–17–1	George Robinson	PTS	12	May 3, 1918	27 years, 10 days	Commercial A.C., Boston, Massachusetts, U.S.	
73	Win	55–17–1	Kid Sheeler	KO	1 (15)	Dec 20, 1917	26 years, 241 days	Maryland A.C., Ardmore, Maryland, U.S.	
72	Win	54–17–1	Mike McTigue	NWS	10	Nov 1, 1917	26 years, 192 days	Clermont Avenue Rink, New York City, New York, U.S.	
71	Loss	53–17–1	Harry Greb	NWS	10	Sep 11, 1917	26 years, 141 days	Auditorium, Milwaukee, Wisconsin, U.S.	
70	Win	53–16–1	Zulu Kid	PTS	15	Jul 21, 1917	26 years, 89 days	Oriole Park, Baltimore, Maryland, U.S.	
69	Win	52–16–1	Len Rowlands	PTS	15	Jun 18, 1917	26 years, 56 days	Elmwood Arena, Elmwood Place, Ohio, U.S.	
68	Loss	51–16–1	Harry Greb	NWS	10	May 19, 1917	26 years, 26 days	Broadway Auditorium, Buffalo, New York, U.S.	
67	Win	51–15–1	Young Ahearn	KO	5 (20)	Apr 23, 1917	26 years, 0 days	Louisiana Auditorium, New Orleans, Louisiana, U.S.	
66	Win	50–15–1	Joe Borrell	NWS	6	Feb 2, 1917	25 years, 285 days	Cambria A.C., Philadelphia, Pennsylvania, U.S.	
65	Win	49–15–1	Leo Lavin	TKO	4 (10)	Jan 30, 1917	25 years, 282 days	German Hall, Albany, New York, U.S.	
64	Loss	48–15–1	Jackie Clark	NWS	10	Jan 25, 1917	25 years, 277 days	Grand Opera House, Herkimer, New York, U.S.	
63	Win	48–14–1	Frank Mantell	PTS	15	Jan 1, 1917	25 years, 253 days	Monumental Theatre, Baltimore, Maryland, U.S.	
62	Win	47–14–1	Joe Eagan	PTS	12	Dec 12, 1916	25 years, 233 days	Arena (Armory A.A.), Boston, Massachusetts, U.S.	
61	Win	46–14–1	Kid Henry	TKO	7 (10)	Nov 30, 1916	25 years, 221 days	German Hall, Albany, New York, U.S.	
60	Win	45–14–1	Joe Herrick	KO	3 (10)	Nov 10, 1916	25 years, 201 days	Auditorium, Milwaukee, Wisconsin, U.S.	
59	Win	44–14–1	Herman Miller	KO	3 (10)	Nov 6, 1916	25 years, 197 days	Albaugh's Theater, Baltimore, Maryland, U.S.	
58	Loss	43–14–1	Jack McCarron	NWS	10	Jul 4, 1916	25 years, 72 days	Allentown, Pennsylvania, U.S.	
57	Loss	43–13–1	Gus Christie	NWS	10	Jun 23, 1916	25 years, 61 days	Flower City A.C., Rochester, New York, U.S.	
56	Win	43–12–1	Zulu Kid	NWS	10	Mar 28, 1916	24 years, 340 days	German Hall, Albany, New York, U.S.	
55	Loss	42–12–1	Mike Gibbons	NWS	10	Mar 17, 1916	24 years, 329 days	Auditorium, Saint Paul, Minnesota, U.S.	World middleweight title claim at stake; (via KO only)
54	Win	42–11–1	George Chip	DQ	7 (12)	Dec 7, 1915	24 years, 228 days	Hippodrome, Boston, Massachusetts, U.S.	
53	Loss	41–11–1	Les Darcy	DQ	2 (20)	May 22, 1915	24 years, 29 days	Sydney Stadium, Sydney, New South Wales, Australia	Lost world middleweight title (Australian version)
52	Win	41–10–1	Harold Hardwick	PTS	20	May 1, 1915	24 years, 8 days	Sydney Stadium, Sydney, New South Wales, Australia	
51	Win	40–10–1	Mick King	PTS	20	Feb 20, 1915	23 years, 303 days	West Melbourne Stadium, Melbourne, Victoria, Australia	Retained world middleweight title (Australian version)
50	Win	39–10–1	Les Darcy	DQ	5 (20)	Jan 23, 1915	23 years, 275 days	Sydney Stadium, Sydney, New South Wales, Australia	Retained world middleweight title (Australian version)
49	Win	38–10–1	Mick King	PTS	20	Dec 26, 1914	23 years, 247 days	Sydney Stadium, Sydney, New South Wales, Australia	Won world middleweight title (Australian version)
48	Loss	37–10–1	Mick King	PTS	20	Nov 28, 1914	23 years, 219 days	Sydney Stadium, Sydney, New South Wales, Australia	Lost world middleweight title (Australian version)
47	Win	37–9–1	Jimmy Clabby	PTS	20	Jun 6, 1914	23 years, 44 days	Sydney Stadium, Sydney, New South Wales, Australia	Retained world middleweight title (Australian version)
46	Win	36–9–1	Pat Bradley	KO	16 (20)	Apr 13, 1914	22 years, 355 days	Sydney Stadium, Sydney, New South Wales, Australia	Retained world middleweight title (Australian version)
45	Win	35–9–1	Eddie McGoorty	PTS	20	Mar 14, 1914	22 years, 325 days	Sydney Stadium, Sydney, New South Wales, Australia	Won world middleweight title (Australian version)
44	Win	34–9–1	Georges Bernard	PTS	20	Nov 15, 1913	22 years, 206 days	Luna Park Arena, Paris, Paris, France	
43	Loss	33–9–1	Georges Carpentier	PTS	20	Oct 11, 1913	22 years, 171 days	Luna Park Arena, Paris, Paris, France	
42	Win	33–8–1	Adrien Hogan	TKO	11 (20)	Apr 2, 1913	21 years, 344 days	Cirque de Paris, Paris, Paris, France	
41	Draw	32–8–1	Frank Mantell	PTS	20	Feb 19, 1913	21 years, 302 days	Salle Wagram, Paris, Paris, France	
40	Win	32–8	Georges Bernard	PTS	10	Jan 25, 1913	21 years, 277 days	Wonderland, Paris, Paris, France	
39	Win	31–8	Jim O'Brien	KO	3 (10)	Dec 21, 1912	21 years, 242 days	Wonderland, Paris, Paris, France	
38	Win	30–8	Harry Mansfield	RTD	6 (10)	Nov 16, 1912	21 years, 207 days	Wonderland, Paris, Paris, France	
37	Win	29–8	Tom Leary	PTS	10	Oct 30, 1912	21 years, 190 days	Salle Wagram, Paris, Paris, France	
36	Win	28–8	Larry English	NWS	10	Sep 23, 1912	21 years, 153 days	German Hall, Albany, New York, U.S.	
35	Win	27–8	Jimmy Howard	NWS	10	Jun 25, 1912	21 years, 63 days	Atlas A.A., Rockaway Beach, New York City, New York, U.S.	
34	Win	26–8	Mike Glover	NWS	10	Jun 6, 1912	21 years, 44 days	Brown's Gym, New York City, New York, U.S.	
33	Loss	25–8	Mike Gibbons	NWS	10	Apr 11, 1912	20 years, 354 days	New Amsterdam Opera House, New York City, New York, U.S.	
32	Win	25–7	Billy West	NWS	10	Feb 27, 1912	20 years, 310 days	Brown's Gym, New York City, New York, U.S.	
31	Loss	24–7	Eddie Palmer	NWS	6	Feb 26, 1912	20 years, 309 days	American A.C., Philadelphia, Pennsylvania, U.S.	
30	Win	24–6	George Chip	PTS	15	Feb 20, 1912	20 years, 303 days	Rhode Island A.C., Thornton, Rhode Island, U.S.	
29	Win	23–6	Young Loughrey	TKO	9 (10)	Feb 1, 1912	20 years, 284 days	New Amsterdam Opera House, New York City, New York, U.S.	
28	Win	22–6	Ted Nelson	KO	4 (10)	Oct 24, 1911	20 years, 184 days	German Hall, Albany, New York, U.S.	
27	Win	21–6	Willie Lewis	NWS	10	Oct 12, 1911	20 years, 172 days	New Amsterdam Opera House, New York City, New York, U.S.	
26	Loss	20–6	Jack Denning	NWS	10	Aug 29, 1911	20 years, 128 days	Brown's Gym A.A., Far Rockaway, New York City, New York, U.S.	
25	Win	20–5	Jimmy Clabby	NWS	10	Jun 22, 1911	20 years, 60 days	New Amsterdam Opera House, New York City, New York, U.S.	
24	Loss	19–5	Dick Nelson	NWS	10	May 16, 1911	20 years, 23 days	Brown's Gym, New York City, New York, U.S.	
23	Win	19–4	Al McCloskey	KO	2 (4)	May 1, 1911	20 years, 8 days	Lotus A.C., Perth Amboy, New Jersey, U.S.	
22	Loss	18–4	Paddy Lavin	NWS	10	Apr 18, 1911	19 years, 360 days	Brown's Gym, New York City, New York, U.S.	
21	Win	18–3	Johnny Carroll	NWS	10	Mar 28, 1911	19 years, 339 days	Brown's Gym, New York City, New York, U.S.	
20	Loss	17–3	Kid Henry	NWS	10	Feb 14, 1911	19 years, 297 days	German Hall, Albany, New York, U.S.	
19	Win	17–2	Paddy Murray	NWS	4	Feb 13, 1911	19 years, 296 days	Colin A.C., New York City, New York, U.S.	
18	Win	16–2	Jim Heywood	KO	2 (10)	Feb 2, 1911	19 years, 285 days	New Amsterdam Opera House, National S.C., New York City, New York, U.S.	
17	Win	15–2	Charley Lawrence	NWS	4	Jan 30, 1911	19 years, 282 days	Central Institute, Newark, New Jersey, U.S.	
16	Win	14–2	Charles Sieger	TKO	2 (10)	Jan 19, 1911	19 years, 271 days	New Amsterdam Opera House, National S.C., New York City, New York, U.S.	
15	Win	13–2	Young Rector	TKO	7 (10)	Jan 5, 1911	19 years, 257 days	New Amsterdam Opera House, National S.C., New York City, New York, U.S.	
14	Loss	12–2	Jack Denning	NWS	6	Dec 23, 1910	19 years, 244 days	New Amsterdam Opera House, National S.C., New York City, New York, U.S.	
13	Win	12–1	Sammy Delmont	NWS	4	Dec 10, 1910	19 years, 231 days	Bayonne, New Jersey, U.S.	
12	Win	11–1	Jack Wade	KO	1 (4)	Dec 2, 1910	19 years, 223 days	New Amsterdam Opera House, National S.C., New York City, New York, U.S.	
11	Win	10–1	Bill Lynch	KO	2 (4)	Nov 25, 1910	19 years, 216 days	New Amsterdam Opera House, New York City, New York, U.S.	
10	Win	9–1	Battling Larry Ryan	NWS	6	Nov 23, 1910	19 years, 214 days	Sharkey A.C., New York City, New York, U.S.	
9	Loss	8–1	Ray Hatfield	NWS	4	Nov 7, 1910	19 years, 198 days	Central Institute, Newark, New Jersey, U.S.	
8	Win	8–0	Al Rose	KO	3 (4)	Oct 25, 1910	19 years, 185 days	Brown's Gym, New York City, New York, U.S.	
7	Win	7–0	Jack Zinn	KO	1 (4)	Oct 25, 1910	19 years, 185 days	Brown's Gym, New York City, New York, U.S.	
6	Win	6–0	Ben Douglas	NWS	4	Aug 22, 1910	19 years, 121 days	Central Institute, Newark, New Jersey, U.S.	
5	Win	5–0	Young Joe Grim	KO	4 (4)	Aug 4, 1910	19 years, 103 days	Long Acre A.C., New York City, New York, U.S.	
4	Win	4–0	Ray Hatfield	NWS	4	Jul 11, 1910	19 years, 79 days	Krueger Auditorium, Newark, New Jersey, U.S.	
3	Win	3–0	Ray Hatfield	KO	3 (4)	May 14, 1910	19 years, 21 days	Central Institute, Newark, New Jersey, U.S.	
2	Win	2–0	Tony Bender	PTS	4	Apr 18, 1910	18 years, 360 days	Central Institute, Newark, New Jersey, U.S.	
1	Win	1–0	Ray Hatfield	NWS	4	Mar 7, 1910	18 years, 318 days	Central Institute, Newark, New Jersey, U.S.	

== Life after boxing ==
After retiring, he became a physical education instructor with the Bayonne Board of Education and the Fort Dix New Jersey Army Base, he also taught boxing lessons at the local YMCA.

Titles in pretence
Preceded by Eddie McGoorty	World Middleweight Champion; March 14, 1914 – November 28, 1914; Only Recognized in Australia	Succeeded by Mick King
Preceded by Mick King	World Middleweight Champion; December 26, 1914 – May 22, 1915; Only Recognized in Australia	Succeeded by Les Darcy
