= Curt McCune =

American boxer

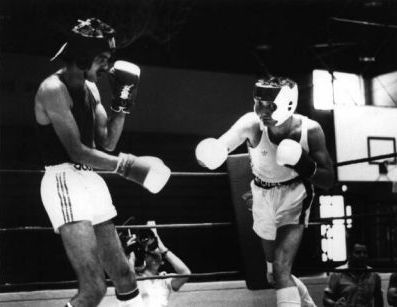
- Curt McCune, right, winning the 1986 ASF Championship at 178 lbs.

Personal information
- Nationality: (United States) American
- Born: Curt McCune; February 8, 1960 (age 66) Birmingham, Alabama
- Weight: 193 lb (88 kg)

Boxing career
- Stance: Orthodox

Boxing record
- Total fights: 83
- Wins: 55
- Losses: 3
- No contests: 25

Curt McCune (born August 2, 1960) is an American former amateur boxer, who was a four-time State of Alabama amateur boxing champion, in the light heavyweight and heavyweight divisions and the 1994 International Law Enforcement Games Boxing Champion at 193 lbs. McCune is currently a private coach and trainer for amateur and professional boxers in the Birmingham, Alabama area.

== Life ==
McCune grew up in Homewood, Alabama and was a walk on member of the University of Alabama Football Team before enlisting in the United States Marine Corps in 1980. Curt has worked in city, county and state law enforcement for over 25-years. He is currently a Sergeant with the Jefferson County Sheriff's Office.

He was named the most outstanding boxer at the 1986 Alabama Sports Festival, was nationally ranked as an amateur boxer and retired from competition in 1994 with a record of 55-3, plus over 25 exhibition bouts (no decision rendered). He has trained with referee Richard Steele at the Sugar Ray Leonard Nevada Partners Center in Las Vegas.

McCune has been licensed as a trainer/second in three states and is a professional boxing trainer and registered Level II coach with USA Boxing. He owned Champions Boxing Gym in Birmingham, Alabama, from 2001 to 2008, where he trained over 25 state and regional amateur boxing champions. McCune was named the outstanding coach at the 2004 USA Boxing Southeastern Regional tournament. He trained professional boxer Michael Gibbons, whom he trained as an amateur. Gibbons won the 2004, 2005 and 2006 Alabama State Golden Gloves titles, and the 2005 Southeastern Association Championship, and made his professional debut in Tennessee in 2007. Gibbons fought in ten bouts from 2007 to 2013 and retired with a record of 5-3-2. McCune also trained Brad Ginn, a state and regional amateur champion at 201 lbs, who won a decision in the 201 lb. Open Class Division at the 2006 Alabama Golden Gloves over 2008 US Olympic bronze medalist and WBC Heavyweight Champion Deontay Wilder.

McCune appeared as an extra in the 2002 short film Johnny Flynton which was nominated for an Academy Award. He currently lives in Birmingham, Alabama.

== Sources ==
- Urquhart, Marietta. "The Prizefighter", Birmingham Magazine, Vol. 47, No. 4 (April 2007), pp. 135–7
- Thompson, Chris. "Lightweight Hopeful Michael Gibbons & Trainer Curt McCune Speak to RSR." Ringside Report, December 10, 2007
