= Michael Gibbons (boxer) =

American boxer (born 1978)

Gibbons in 2008

Michael "The Godfather" Gibbons (born September 23, 1978 in Midfield, Alabama) is a former lightweight prizefighter who fought as a southpaw out of Birmingham, Alabama. He was known for his uncanny ability to make people miss him with punches.

He is the reigning Southern Championship Boxing Council Junior Welterweight Champion and as an amateur won the 2004 Alabama State Golden Gloves title, 2005 Alabama State Golden Gloves title, 2006 Alabama State Golden Gloves 132-pound open division championship. He also won the 2005 Southeastern Association Championship.

Gibbons was turned onto the sport at the age of 16 when he saw Pernell Whitaker fight Buddy McGirt on HBO on October 1, 1994. He began collecting fight tapes emulating what he saw and says that he modelled his style of fighting on that of Pernell Whitaker's. He graduated from Midfield High School in 1996 and trained locally until his coaches' houses were destroyed by the 1998 F-5 Oak Grove tornado.

He continued fighting in "Tough Man" competitions while a student at UAB and for a semester of law school. He worked in local advertising firms and soon joined up with boxing coaches Curt McCune and Jake Guercio of Champions Boxing and Fitness in Pelham and began boxing on the amateur circuit compiling a 21-3 amateur record.

In August 2006 Gibbons relocated to Brooklyn, New York to train at the legendary Gleason's Gym. He trained there with Guyanese Olympian Darius Forde and sparred with fighters from Lennox Blackmoore's stable. Working to begin his professional career and be the only active professional from the city of Birmingham. Gibbons landed a slot against Kevin Huddleston in an undercard fight in Tunica, Mississippi on April 28, 2007. He returned to Alabama to prepare for the bout, only to have Huddleston withdraw.

Gibbons ended up making his debut on September 14 against Corey Frizzell at the National Guard Armory in Columbia, Tennessee. Gibbons dominated the four-round fight and began preparing for a December 4 card in Memphis. That fight was canceled. He next defeated Josh Welch on January 26, 2008 in a bout at the Birmingham Race Course.

Gibbons followed that with a four-round decision over 8-2 Anthony Middlebrooks of Tuscaloosa, also at the Birmingham Race Course. After 3 wins and no losses, Gibbons became the Southern Championship Boxing Council Junior Welterweight Champion.

Gibbons next bout took place June 28 in Bay St. Louis, MS. as part of Tony Dane's World Wide Boxing card. Gibbons defeated hometown boxer Leo Perez by unanimous decision 40–36 on all three cards. Gibbons used a strong jab and effective combinations along with slick head movement to dominate his undermanned opponent.

Gibbons re-entered the ring on November 1, 2008 in West Memphis, Arkansas. His opponent, Michael Williams, was coming off an upset of a highly ranked fighter. Gibbons used his elusive defense and precise counter-punching to escape with the decision.

On February 27, 2009 Gibbons re-entered the ring vs. Williams in Fight for Autism at the Birmingham Race Course. Early in the second round Gibbons would suffer a headbutt that split open his eye. He fought on and lost a hard-fought decision.

June 26, 2009 Gibbons and Williams were to settle it all in "Revenge at the Race Course" in Birmingham. Two weeks before the bout Williams pulled out. In stepped Andrew Costa of Columbia, Tennessee. Gibbons put on one of his best performances, battering Costa over four rounds in front of a pro-gibbons crowd.

August 7, 2009 Gibbons stepped in the ring in Columbia, Tennessee and dominated his opponent with very slick head movement and precise counter punching.

October 9, 2009 Gibbons took on Tony Marks of Tampa, Fl. Gibbons came out strong. He stunned Marks with a right hook to start the bout and continued his assault. He scored 2 8 counts in round 2. Round 3 saw Marks wilt behind body shots from Gibbons. Round 4 Marks looked ready to go but he was able to hang on and survive the round despite another 8 count and numerous body shots that stunned Marks. Gibbons won the fight on 40–32 on all 3 cards.

November 21, 2009 Crossville, Tn. Gibbons vs. Ricky Delorier of Atlanta. Gibbons was elusive in rd 1 and scored hard combinations. Round 2 saw Gibbons stun Delorier with a body shot which resulted in an eight count. Gibbons followed up with a hard right hook to the head and Referee Anthony Bryant waived the bout off as Delorier slumped over. Gibbons received the TKO victory in round 2.

May 1, 2010 Atlanta Gibbons took on highly touted prospect Jose Martinez of Mexico at The Big Rockout Show at Atlanta's turner field. It was a heated contest between two highly skilled fighters. The crowd rose to their feet many times throughout the bout. The bout scored 38-37 for Gibbons, 38-37 Martinez and 38-36 Martinez. Gibbons lost a very unpopular split decision with the crowd.

== Sources ==
- Urquhart, Marietta. "The Prizefighter", Birmingham Magazine, Vol. 47, No. 4 (April 2007), pp. 135–7
- Thompson, Chris. "Lightweight Hopeful Michael Gibbons & Trainer Curt McCune Speak to RSR." Ringside Report, December 10, 2007
