= Mike Gibbons (boxer) =

American boxer (1887–1956)

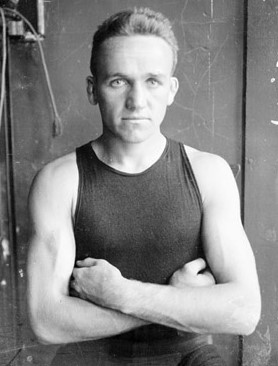
- Gibbons in 1912

Personal information
- Nickname: St. Paul Phantom
- Born: Michael J. Gibbons; July 20, 1887 St. Paul, Minnesota, U.S.
- Died: August 31, 1956 (aged 69)
- Weight: Middleweight

Boxing career
- Stance: Orthodox

Boxing record
- Total fights: 132; With the inclusion of newspaper decisions
- Wins: 112
- Win by KO: 38
- Losses: 12
- Draws: 8

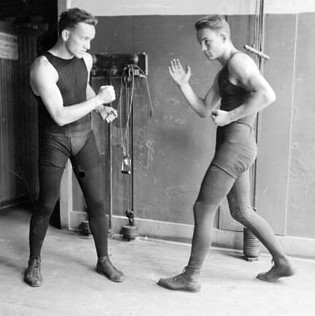
Mike (left), posing with his brother Tommy Gibbons in 1912

Michael J. Gibbons (July 20, 1887 – August 31, 1956) was an American boxer from 1908 to 1922. The brother of heavyweight Tommy Gibbons, he claimed Middleweight Champion of the World status in 1909 following Stanley Ketchel's murder. Although he never won the title, Gibbons is regarded as one of the all-time best welter and middleweight boxers by historians. Statistical boxing website BoxRec lists Gibbons as the #18 ranked middleweight of all time, while The Ring Magazine founder Nat Fleischer placed him at #9. The International Boxing Research Organization rates Gibbons as the 17th best middleweight ever and boxing historian Bert Sugar placed him 92nd in his Top 100 Fighters catalogue. Gibbons retired due to deteriorating vision. Following his boxing career he entered business in his native St. Paul, and became a member of the Minnesota Athletic Commission. Gibbons was elected to the Ring Magazine Hall of Fame in 1958, the International Boxing Hall of Fame in 1992, the World Boxing Hall of Fame in 1997, and the Minnesota Boxing Hall of Fame in 2010.

== Professional boxing record ==
All information in this section is derived from BoxRec, unless otherwise stated.

=== Official record ===
132 fights	65 wins	3 losses
By knockout	38	0
By decision	26	3
By disqualification	1	0
Draws	4	
Newspaper decisions/draws	60	

All newspaper decisions are officially regarded as "no decision" bouts and are not counted in the win/loss/draw column.

No.	Result	Record	Opponent	Type	Round	Date	Age	Location	Notes
132	Win	65–3–4 (60)	Danny Fagan	TKO	5 (12)	May 16, 1922	34 years, 300 days	Board of Trade Building, Winnipeg, Manitoba, Canada	
131	Loss	64–3–4 (60)	Mike O'Dowd	PTS	12	May 6, 1922	34 years, 290 days	Queensboro Stadium, New York City, New York, U.S.	
130	Win	64–2–4 (60)	Charley Nashert	PTS	15	Apr 28, 1922	34 years, 282 days	City Coliseum, Oklahoma City, Minnesota, U.S.	
129	Win	63–2–4 (60)	Battling Ortega	KO	1 (10)	Apr 8, 1922	34 years, 262 days	Auditorium, Saint Paul, Minnesota, U.S.	
128	Win	62–2–4 (60)	Leo Stokes	NWS	10	Mar 14, 1922	34 years, 237 days	Grand Forks, North Dakota, U.S.	
127	Win	62–2–4 (59)	Stockyards Tommy Murphy	NWS	10	Mar 9, 1922	34 years, 232 days	Peoria, Illinois, U.S.	
126	Win	62–2–4 (58)	Mike O'Dowd	NWS	10	Dec 16, 1921	34 years, 149 days	Auditorium, Saint Paul, Minnesota, U.S.	
125	Win	62–2–4 (57)	Augie Ratner	PTS	12	Dec 5, 1921	34 years, 138 days	Coliseum, Saint Louis, Missouri, U.S.	
124	Win	61–2–4 (57)	Phil Krug	NWS	12	Dec 1, 1921	34 years, 134 days	Newark Athletic Club, Newark, New Jersey, U.S.	
123	Loss	61–2–4 (56)	Tommy Robson	PTS	10	Nov 25, 1921	34 years, 128 days	Arena, Boston, Massachusetts, U.S.	
122	Win	61–1–4 (56)	Happy Littleton	PTS	15	Oct 31, 1921	34 years, 103 days	Louisiana Auditorium, New Orleans, Louisiana, U.S.	
121	Win	60–1–4 (56)	Joe Herrick	PTS	10	Oct 6, 1921	34 years, 78 days	City Auditorium, Omaha, Nebraska, U.S.	
120	Win	59–1–4 (56)	Battling Ortega	TKO	7 (10)	Sep 16, 1921	34 years, 58 days	Stratton Arena, Colorado Springs, Colorado, U.S.	
119	Win	58–1–4 (56)	Young Fisher	NWS	10	Sep 13, 1921	34 years, 55 days	Lexington Park, Saint Paul, Minnesota, U.S.	
118	Win	58–1–4 (55)	Jeff Smith	NWS	12	Aug 9, 1921	34 years, 20 days	Armory A.A., Jersey City, New Jersey, U.S.	
117	Win	58–1–4 (54)	Gus Platts	PTS	10	Aug 5, 1921	34 years, 16 days	Arena, Boston, Massachusetts, U.S.	
116	Win	57–1–4 (54)	Augie Ratner	PTS	10	Aug 4, 1921	34 years, 15 days	Dyckman Oval, New York City, New York, U.S.	
115	Win	56–1–4 (54)	Al Sommers	TKO	11 (12)	Jul 4, 1921	33 years, 349 days	Race Track, Alan, Idaho, U.S.	
114	Win	55–1–4 (54)	Eddie McGoorty	KO	5 (10)	Jun 17, 1921	33 years, 332 days	Nicollet Park, Minneapolis, Minnesota, U.S.	
113	Win	54–1–4 (54)	Silent Martin	TKO	10 (15)	Jun 7, 1921	33 years, 322 days	Brooklyn Arena, New York City, New York, U.S.	
112	Win	53–1–4 (54)	Sailor Weldon	TKO	2 (10)	Jun 6, 1921	33 years, 321 days	Star Park, Syracuse, New York, U.S.	
111	Win	52–1–4 (54)	Dave Rosenberg	UD	12	May 30, 1921	33 years, 314 days	Ebbets Field, New York City, New York, U.S.	
110	Win	51–1–4 (54)	Leo Leonard	NWS	10	May 26, 1921	33 years, 310 days	Town Hall, Scranton, Pennsylvania, U.S.	
109	Win	51–1–4 (53)	Paddy Flynn	PTS	15	May 20, 1921	33 years, 304 days	Brooklyn Arena, New York City, New York, U.S.	
108	Win	50–1–4 (53)	Frankie Maguire	KO	6 (8)	May 9, 1921	33 years, 293 days	National A.C., Philadelphia, Pennsylvania, U.S.	
107	Loss	49–1–4 (53)	Chuck Wiggins	NWS	10	May 4, 1921	33 years, 288 days	Armory, Grand Rapids, Michigan, U.S.	
106	Win	49–1–4 (52)	Chuck Wiggins	NWS	10	Apr 21, 1921	33 years, 275 days	Kenwood Armory, Minneapolis, Minnesota, U.S.	
105	Loss	49–1–4 (51)	Mike O'Dowd	NWS	10	Nov 21, 1919	32 years, 124 days	Auditorium, Saint Paul, Minnesota, U.S.	World middleweight title at stake; (via KO only)
104	Loss	49–1–4 (50)	Jeff Smith	NWS	10	Jul 4, 1919	31 years, 349 days	Association Park, Kansas City, Missouri, U.S.	
103	Loss	49–1–4 (49)	Harry Greb	NWS	10	Jun 23, 1919	31 years, 338 days	Forbes Field, Pittsburgh, Pennsylvania, U.S.	
102	Win	49–1–4 (48)	George Chip	NWS	10	Jun 11, 1919	31 years, 326 days	Three-I League Park, Terre Haute, Indiana, U.S.	
101	Win	49–1–4 (47)	George K.O. Brown	NWS	8	May 19, 1919	31 years, 303 days	New Lyric Theater, Memphis, Tennessee, U.S.	
100	Win	49–1–4 (46)	Jakob "Soldier" Bartfield	PTS	4	Apr 22, 1919	31 years, 276 days	Coliseum, San Francisco, California, U.S.	
99	Win	48–1–4 (46)	Leo Florian Hauck	NWS	8	Mar 25, 1919	31 years, 248 days	Coliseum, Saint Louis, Missouri, U.S.	
98	Win	48–1–4 (45)	Len Rowlands	NWS	10	Mar 12, 1919	31 years, 235 days	Stockyards Stadium, Denver, Colorado, U.S.	
97	Win	48–1–4 (44)	Jakob "Soldier" Bartfield	NWS	10	Mar 4, 1919	31 years, 227 days	Auditorium, Saint Paul, Minnesota, U.S.	
96	Win	48–1–4 (43)	Billy Kramer	TKO	3 (10)	Feb 27, 1919	31 years, 222 days	Town Hall, Scranton, Pennsylvania, U.S.	
95	Win	47–1–4 (43)	George Chip	NWS	10	Jan 31, 1919	31 years, 195 days	Auditorium, Saint Paul, Minnesota, U.S.	
94	Win	47–1–4 (42)	Frank Mantell	KO	3 (10)	Oct 12, 1917	30 years, 84 days	Auditorium, Saint Paul, Minnesota, U.S.	Retained world middleweight title claim
93	Win	46–1–4 (42)	Jimmy Howard	KO	4 (10)	Sep 14, 1917	30 years, 56 days	Duluth, Minnesota, U.S.	
92	Win	45–1–4 (42)	Jack Dillon	NWS	10	Sep 3, 1917	30 years, 45 days	Fair Grounds, Terre Haute, Indiana, U.S.	
91	Win	45–1–4 (41)	George Chip	NWS	12	Jul 4, 1917	29 years, 349 days	Wright Field, Youngstown, Ohio, U.S.	World middleweight title claim at stake; (via KO only)
90	Win	45–1–4 (40)	Al Sommers	PTS	6	May 8, 1917	29 years, 292 days	Broadway Theater, Portland, Oregon, U.S.	
89	Win	44–1–4 (40)	Ray Campbell	PTS	4	May 4, 1917	29 years, 288 days	Arena, Vancouver, British Columbia, Canada	
88	Win	43–1–4 (40)	Harry Greb	NWS	6	Feb 10, 1917	29 years, 205 days	National A.C., Philadelphia, Pennsylvania, U.S.	
87	Win	43–1–4 (39)	Clay Turner	NWS	4	Dec 8, 1916	29 years, 141 days	Sioux City, Iowa, U.S.	
86	Win	43–1–4 (38)	Jack Dillon	NWS	10	Nov 10, 1916	29 years, 113 days	Auditorium, Saint Paul, Minnesota, U.S.	
85	Win	43–1–4 (37)	Ted "Kid" Lewis	NWS	10	May 18, 1916	28 years, 303 days	Madison Square Garden, New York City, New York, U.S.	World middleweight title claim at stake; (via KO only)
84	Win	43–1–4 (36)	Jeff Smith	NWS	10	Mar 17, 1916	28 years, 241 days	Auditorium, Saint Paul, Minnesota, U.S.	World middleweight title claim at stake; (via KO only)
83	Win	43–1–4 (35)	Young Ahearn	KO	1 (10)	Jan 18, 1916	28 years, 182 days	Auditorium, Saint Paul, Minnesota, U.S.	Won world middleweight title claim
82	Loss	42–1–4 (35)	Packey McFarland	NWS	10	Sep 11, 1915	28 years, 53 days	Brighton Beach Motordrome, New York City, New York, U.S.	
81	Loss	42–1–4 (34)	Jakob "Soldier" Bartfield	NWS	10	May 31, 1915	27 years, 315 days	Ebbets Field, New York City, New York, U.S.	
80	Win	42–1–4 (33)	Leo Florian Hauck	NWS	10	May 26, 1915	27 years, 310 days	St. Nicholas Arena, New York City, New York, U.S.	
79	Win	42–1–4 (32)	Eddie McGoorty	NWS	10	Mar 2, 1915	27 years, 225 days	Arena, Hudson, Wisconsin, U.S.	
78	Win	42–1–4 (31)	Jimmy Clabby	NWS	10	Jan 21, 1915	27 years, 185 days	Auditorium, Milwaukee, Wisconsin, U.S.	
77	Win	42–1–4 (30)	Willie K.O. Brennan	NWS	10	Dec 14, 1914	27 years, 147 days	Elmwood Music Hall, Buffalo, New York, U.S.	
76	Win	42–1–4 (29)	Bob Moha	DQ	2 (10)	Dec 4, 1914	27 years, 137 days	Arena, Hudson, Wisconsin, U.S.	
75	Win	41–1–4 (29)	Young Mike Donovan	TKO	6 (10)	Nov 9, 1914	27 years, 112 days	Madison Square Garden, New York City, New York, U.S.	
74	Win	40–1–4 (29)	Billy Maxwell	NWS	10	Oct 27, 1914	27 years, 99 days	Broadway S.C., New York City, New York, U.S.	
73	Win	40–1–4 (28)	Bill MacKinnon	NWS	10	Sep 21, 1914	27 years, 63 days	Covington, Kentucky, U.S.	
72	Win	40–1–4 (27)	George K.O. Brown	NWS	10	Sep 7, 1914	27 years, 49 days	Benton Harbor, Michigan, U.S.	
71	Win	40–1–4 (26)	George K.O. Brown	PTS	12	Jun 9, 1914	26 years, 324 days	Arena, Boston, Massachusetts, U.S.	
70	Win	39–1–4 (26)	Vic Hansen	TKO	6 (10)	May 29, 1914	26 years, 313 days	15th Street Garage, Kansas City, Missouri, U.S.	
69	Win	38–1–4 (26)	Johnny "Kid" Alberts	NWS	10	May 26, 1914	26 years, 310 days	Alhambra Rink, Syracuse, New York, U.S.	
68	Win	38–1–4 (25)	Johnny Howard	NWS	10	May 5, 1914	26 years, 289 days	Broadway S.C., New York City, New York, U.S.	
67	Win	38–1–4 (24)	Gus Christie	NWS	10	Mar 24, 1914	26 years, 247 days	Arena, Hudson, Wisconsin, U.S.	
66	Win	38–1–4 (23)	Al McCoy	NWS	10	Feb 23, 1914	26 years, 218 days	Irving A.C., New York City, New York, U.S.	
65	Win	38–1–4 (22)	Perry "Kid" Graves	NWS	6	Feb 16, 1914	26 years, 211 days	Olympia A.C., Philadelphia, Pennsylvania, U.S.	
64	Win	38–1–4 (21)	Bob McAllister	KO	7 (10)	Jan 12, 1914	26 years, 176 days	Madison Square Garden, New York City, New York, U.S.	
63	Win	37–1–4 (21)	Joe Hirst	NWS	6	Dec 15, 1913	26 years, 148 days	Olympia A.C., Philadelphia, Pennsylvania, U.S.	
62	Win	37–1–4 (20)	Wildcat Ferns	TKO	2 (10)	Dec 10, 1913	26 years, 143 days	Pelican Stadium, New Orleans, Louisiana, U.S.	
61	Win	36–1–4 (20)	Marty Rowan	TKO	2 (10)	Nov 14, 1913	26 years, 117 days	Twyford A.C., New York City, New York, U.S.	
60	Win	35–1–4 (20)	Emmett "Kid" Wagner	KO	9 (10)	Oct 30, 1913	26 years, 102 days	Coliseum A.C., Wilkes-Barre, Pennsylvania, U.S.	
59	Win	34–1–4 (20)	Spike Kelly	NWS	10	Oct 9, 1913	26 years, 81 days	Kenosha A.C., Kenosha, Wisconsin, U.S.	American welterweight title at stake; (via KO only)
58	Win	34–1–4 (19)	Young Ahearn	KO	4 (10)	Jun 13, 1913	25 years, 328 days	Madison Square Garden, New York City, New York, U.S.	
57	Win	33–1–4 (19)	Joe White	PTS	12	Jun 3, 1913	25 years, 318 days	Arena, Boston, Massachusetts, U.S.	
56	Win	32–1–4 (19)	Jimmy Perry	TKO	2 (6)	May 29, 1913	25 years, 313 days	Exposition Hall, Pittsburgh, Pennsylvania, U.S.	
55	Win	31–1–4 (19)	Jack McCarron	NWS	10	May 16, 1913	25 years, 300 days	Madison Square Garden, New York City, New York, U.S.	
54	Win	31–1–4 (18)	Gus Christie	PTS	12	May 13, 1913	25 years, 297 days	Arena, Boston, Massachusetts, U.S.	
53	Loss	30–1–4 (18)	Eddie McGoorty	NWS	10	Dec 4, 1912	25 years, 137 days	Madison Square Garden, New York City, New York, U.S.	
52	Loss	30–1–4 (17)	Jack McCarron	NWS	6	Nov 20, 1912	25 years, 123 days	National A.C., Philadelphia, Pennsylvania, U.S.	
51	Win	30–1–4 (16)	Tommy Maloney	NWS	10	Sep 23, 1912	25 years, 65 days	Madison Square Garden, New York City, New York, U.S.	
50	Win	30–1–4 (15)	Young McCartney	KO	2 (6)	Sep 14, 1912	25 years, 56 days	National A.C., Philadelphia, Pennsylvania, U.S.	
49	Win	29–1–4 (15)	Sid Burns	RTD	5 (10)	Jul 1, 1912	24 years, 347 days	Madison Square Garden, New York City, New York, U.S.	
48	Win	28–1–4 (15)	Joe Stein	NWS	10	Jun 25, 1912	24 years, 341 days	St. Nicholas Arena, New York City, New York, U.S.	
47	Win	28–1–4 (14)	Tommy Connors	NWS	10	Jun 10, 1912	24 years, 326 days	Irving A.C., New York City, New York, U.S.	
46	Win	28–1–4 (13)	Willie K.O. Brennan	PTS	10	May 31, 1912	24 years, 316 days	Victor A.C., Cleveland, Ohio, U.S.	
45	Win	27–1–4 (13)	Paddy Lavin	TKO	8 (10)	May 14, 1912	24 years, 299 days	Convention Hall, Buffalo, New York, U.S.	
44	Win	26–1–4 (13)	Jeff Smith	NWS	10	Apr 11, 1912	24 years, 266 days	New Amsterdam Opera House, New York City, New York, U.S.	
43	Win	26–1–4 (12)	Jack Denning	NWS	10	Mar 26, 1912	24 years, 250 days	Fairmont A.C., New York City, New York, U.S.	
42	Win	26–1–4 (11)	Willie Lewis	KO	2 (10)	Feb 23, 1912	24 years, 218 days	Empire A.C., New York City, New York, U.S.	
41	Win	25–1–4 (11)	Tommy Howell	NWS	6	Feb 17, 1912	24 years, 212 days	National A.C., Philadelphia, Pennsylvania, U.S.	
40	Win	25–1–4 (10)	Freddie Hicks	NWS	10	Feb 13, 1912	24 years, 208 days	Fairmont A.C., New York City, New York, U.S.	
39	Win	25–1–4 (9)	Mike Cashman	TKO	4 (10)	Feb 7, 1912	24 years, 202 days	Empire A.C., New York City, New York, U.S.	
38	Draw	24–1–4 (9)	Jack Denning	NWS	10	Jan 23, 1912	24 years, 187 days	Fairmont A.C., New York City, New York, U.S.	
37	Draw	24–1–4 (8)	Young Erne	NWS	6	Dec 16, 1911	24 years, 149 days	National A.C., Philadelphia, Pennsylvania, U.S.	
36	Win	24–1–4 (7)	Frank Perron	KO	9 (15)	Dec 12, 1911	24 years, 145 days	Rhode Island A.C., Thornton, Rhode Island, U.S.	
35	Win	23–1–4 (7)	Walter Coffey	NWS	10	Dec 5, 1911	24 years, 138 days	Fairmont A.C., New York City, New York, U.S.	
34	Win	23–1–4 (6)	Willie Lewis	NWS	10	Nov 28, 1911	24 years, 131 days	Fairmont A.C., New York City, New York, U.S.	
33	Win	23–1–4 (5)	Billy Sherman	TKO	4 (10)	Nov 10, 1911	24 years, 113 days	New Polo A.C., New York City, New York, U.S.	
32	Draw	22–1–4 (5)	Hilliard Lang	NWS	15	Oct 17, 1911	24 years, 89 days	Auditorium Rink, Winnipeg, Manitoba, Canada	
31	Draw	22–1–4 (4)	Jimmy Clabby	NWS	15	Sep 29, 1911	24 years, 71 days	Auditorium Rink, Winnipeg, Manitoba, Canada	
30	Loss	22–1–4 (3)	Jimmy Clabby	NWS	10	Sep 1, 1911	24 years, 43 days	Terminal Building, Milwaukee, Wisconsin, U.S.	
29	Win	22–1–4 (2)	Hilliard Lang	TKO	10 (15)	Aug 24, 1911	24 years, 35 days	Auditorium Rink, Winnipeg, Manitoba, Canada	
28	Win	21–1–4 (2)	Young Kid Broad	KO	13 (15)	Jul 4, 1911	23 years, 349 days	Auditorium Rink, Winnipeg, Manitoba, Canada	
27	Win	20–1–4 (2)	Joe Wilson	KO	8 (10)	Jun 16, 1911	23 years, 331 days	Auditorium Rink, Winnipeg, Manitoba, Canada	
26	Win	19–1–4 (2)	Gus Christie	NWS	10	May 5, 1911	23 years, 289 days	Terminal Building, Milwaukee, Wisconsin, U.S.	
25	Win	19–1–4 (1)	Gus Christie	NWS	8	Apr 17, 1911	23 years, 271 days	Public Service Building, Milwaukee, Wisconsin, U.S.	
24	Win	19–1–4	Freddie Hicks	PTS	8	Mar 26, 1911	23 years, 249 days	Minneapolis, Minnesota, U.S.	
23	Win	18–1–4	Art Godfrey	KO	14 (15)	Mar 15, 1911	23 years, 238 days	Minneapolis, Minnesota, U.S.	
22	Win	17–1–4	Kid Grantly	KO	5 (10)	Jan 8, 1911	23 years, 172 days	Minneapolis, Minnesota, U.S.	
21	Win	16–1–4	Al Hoppe	KO	3 (10)	Dec 2, 1910	23 years, 135 days	Hibbing, Minnesota, U.S.	
20	Draw	15–1–4	Jack Doyle	PTS	10	Nov 13, 1910	23 years, 116 days	Cooke's Gym, Minneapolis, Minnesota, U.S.	
19	Draw	15–1–3	Jack Doyle	PTS	15	Sep 23, 1910	23 years, 65 days	Duluth, Minnesota, U.S.	
18	Win	15–1–2	Jack Parres	KO	3 (10)	Jul 4, 1910	22 years, 349 days	Minneapolis, Minnesota, U.S.	
17	Draw	14–1–2	Herbert Catherwood	PTS	10	May 4, 1910	22 years, 288 days	Minneapolis, Minnesota, U.S.	
16	Win	14–1–1	Kid Grantly	KO	9 (10)	Jan 10, 1910	22 years, 174 days	Saint Paul, Minnesota, U.S.	
15	Win	13–1–1	Jack Doyle	PTS	10	Nov 1, 1909	22 years, 104 days	Saint Paul, Minnesota, U.S.	
14	Loss	12–1–1	Jimmy Clabby	PTS	10	Sep 11, 1909	22 years, 53 days	Saint Paul, Minnesota, U.S.	
13	Win	12–0–1	Jimmy Bartos	PTS	6	Aug 21, 1909	22 years, 32 days	Hudson, Wisconsin, U.S.	
12	Win	11–0–1	Theodore Thompson	PTS	6	Jun 4, 1909	21 years, 319 days	Saint Paul, Minnesota, U.S.	
11	Win	10–0–1	Roy Moore	PTS	10	Apr 12, 1909	21 years, 266 days	Saint Paul, Minnesota, U.S.	
10	Win	9–0–1	Art Godfrey	KO	1 (10)	Mar 1, 1909	21 years, 224 days	Saint Paul, Minnesota, U.S.	
9	Win	8–0–1	George Brown	KO	1 (6)	Jan 5, 1909	21 years, 169 days	Saint Paul, Minnesota, U.S.	
8	Win	7–0–1	Theodore Thompson	PTS	6	Nov 10, 1908	21 years, 113 days	Saint Paul, Minnesota, U.S.	
7	Win	6–0–1	Con Holland	PTS	6	Jun 24, 1908	20 years, 340 days	Saint Paul, Minnesota, U.S.	
6	Win	5–0–1	Jimmy Bartos	PTS	6	Jun 1, 1908	20 years, 317 days	Saint Paul, Minnesota, U.S.	
5	Win	4–0–1	Mike Brown	PTS	6	Apr 30, 1908	20 years, 285 days	Saint Paul, Minnesota, U.S.	
4	Win	3–0–1	Otto Herwig	PTS	10	Apr 1, 1908	20 years, 256 days	Minneapolis, Minnesota, U.S.	
3	Draw	2–0–1	Herbert Catherwood	PTS	15	Mar 2, 1908	20 years, 226 days	Saint Paul, Minnesota, U.S.	
2	Win	2–0	Roy Moore	KO	3 (6)	Jan 11, 1908	20 years, 175 days	Saint Paul, Minnesota, U.S.	
1	Win	1–0	Newsboy Brown	PTS	6	Dec 1, 1907	20 years, 134 days	Saint Paul, Minnesota, U.S.	Exact date uncertain; Professional debut

=== Unofficial record ===
132 fights	112 wins	12 losses
By knockout	38	0
By decision	73	12
By disqualification	1	0
Draws	8	

Record with the inclusion of newspaper decisions in the win/loss/draw column.

No.	Result	Record	Opponent	Type	Round	Date	Age	Location	Notes
132	Win	112–12–8	Danny Fagan	TKO	5 (12)	May 16, 1922	34 years, 300 days	Board of Trade Building, Winnipeg, Manitoba, Canada	
131	Loss	111–12–8	Mike O'Dowd	PTS	12	May 6, 1922	34 years, 290 days	Queensboro Stadium, New York City, New York, U.S.	
130	Win	111–11–8	Charley Nashert	PTS	15	Apr 28, 1922	34 years, 282 days	City Coliseum, Oklahoma City, Minnesota, U.S.	
129	Win	110–11–8	Battling Ortega	KO	1 (10)	Apr 8, 1922	34 years, 262 days	Auditorium, Saint Paul, Minnesota, U.S.	
128	Win	109–11–8	Leo Stokes	NWS	10	Mar 14, 1922	34 years, 237 days	Grand Forks, North Dakota, U.S.	
127	Win	108–11–8	Stockyards Tommy Murphy	NWS	10	Mar 9, 1922	34 years, 232 days	Peoria, Illinois, U.S.	
126	Win	107–11–8	Mike O'Dowd	NWS	10	Dec 16, 1921	34 years, 149 days	Auditorium, Saint Paul, Minnesota, U.S.	
125	Win	106–11–8	Augie Ratner	PTS	12	Dec 5, 1921	34 years, 138 days	Coliseum, Saint Louis, Missouri, U.S.	
124	Win	105–11–8	Phil Krug	NWS	12	Dec 1, 1921	34 years, 134 days	Newark Athletic Club, Newark, New Jersey, U.S.	
123	Loss	104–11–8	Tommy Robson	PTS	10	Nov 25, 1921	34 years, 128 days	Arena, Boston, Massachusetts, U.S.	
122	Win	104–10–8	Happy Littleton	PTS	15	Oct 31, 1921	34 years, 103 days	Louisiana Auditorium, New Orleans, Louisiana, U.S.	
121	Win	103–10–8	Joe Herrick	PTS	10	Oct 6, 1921	34 years, 78 days	City Auditorium, Omaha, Nebraska, U.S.	
120	Win	102–10–8	Battling Ortega	TKO	7 (10)	Sep 16, 1921	34 years, 58 days	Stratton Arena, Colorado Springs, Colorado, U.S.	
119	Win	101–10–8	Young Fisher	NWS	10	Sep 13, 1921	34 years, 55 days	Lexington Park, Saint Paul, Minnesota, U.S.	
118	Win	100–10–8	Jeff Smith	NWS	12	Aug 9, 1921	34 years, 20 days	Armory A.A., Jersey City, New Jersey, U.S.	
117	Win	99–10–8	Gus Platts	PTS	10	Aug 5, 1921	34 years, 16 days	Arena, Boston, Massachusetts, U.S.	
116	Win	98–10–8	Augie Ratner	PTS	10	Aug 4, 1921	34 years, 15 days	Dyckman Oval, New York City, New York, U.S.	
115	Win	97–10–8	Al Sommers	TKO	11 (12)	Jul 4, 1921	33 years, 349 days	Race Track, Alan, Idaho, U.S.	
114	Win	96–10–8	Eddie McGoorty	KO	5 (10)	Jun 17, 1921	33 years, 332 days	Nicollet Park, Minneapolis, Minnesota, U.S.	
113	Win	95–10–8	Silent Martin	TKO	10 (15)	Jun 7, 1921	33 years, 322 days	Brooklyn Arena, New York City, New York, U.S.	
112	Win	94–10–8	Sailor Weldon	TKO	2 (10)	Jun 6, 1921	33 years, 321 days	Star Park, Syracuse, New York, U.S.	
111	Win	93–10–8	Dave Rosenberg	UD	12	May 30, 1921	33 years, 314 days	Ebbets Field, New York City, New York, U.S.	
110	Win	92–10–8	Leo Leonard	NWS	10	May 26, 1921	33 years, 310 days	Town Hall, Scranton, Pennsylvania, U.S.	
109	Win	91–10–8	Paddy Flynn	PTS	15	May 20, 1921	33 years, 304 days	Brooklyn Arena, New York City, New York, U.S.	
108	Win	90–10–8	Frankie Maguire	KO	6 (8)	May 9, 1921	33 years, 293 days	National A.C., Philadelphia, Pennsylvania, U.S.	
107	Loss	89–10–8	Chuck Wiggins	NWS	10	May 4, 1921	33 years, 288 days	Armory, Grand Rapids, Michigan, U.S.	
106	Win	89–9–8	Chuck Wiggins	NWS	10	Apr 21, 1921	33 years, 275 days	Kenwood Armory, Minneapolis, Minnesota, U.S.	
105	Loss	88–9–8	Mike O'Dowd	NWS	10	Nov 21, 1919	32 years, 124 days	Auditorium, Saint Paul, Minnesota, U.S.	World middleweight title at stake; (via KO only)
104	Loss	88–8–8	Jeff Smith	NWS	10	Jul 4, 1919	31 years, 349 days	Association Park, Kansas City, Missouri, U.S.	
103	Loss	88–7–8	Harry Greb	NWS	10	Jun 23, 1919	31 years, 338 days	Forbes Field, Pittsburgh, Pennsylvania, U.S.	
102	Win	88–6–8	George Chip	NWS	10	Jun 11, 1919	31 years, 326 days	Three-I League Park, Terre Haute, Indiana, U.S.	
101	Win	87–6–8	George K.O. Brown	NWS	8	May 19, 1919	31 years, 303 days	New Lyric Theater, Memphis, Tennessee, U.S.	
100	Win	86–6–8	Jakob "Soldier" Bartfield	PTS	4	Apr 22, 1919	31 years, 276 days	Coliseum, San Francisco, California, U.S.	
99	Win	85–6–8	Leo Florian Hauck	NWS	8	Mar 25, 1919	31 years, 248 days	Coliseum, Saint Louis, Missouri, U.S.	
98	Win	84–6–8	Len Rowlands	NWS	10	Mar 12, 1919	31 years, 235 days	Stockyards Stadium, Denver, Colorado, U.S.	
97	Win	83–6–8	Jakob "Soldier" Bartfield	NWS	10	Mar 4, 1919	31 years, 227 days	Auditorium, Saint Paul, Minnesota, U.S.	
96	Win	82–6–8	Billy Kramer	TKO	3 (10)	Feb 27, 1919	31 years, 222 days	Town Hall, Scranton, Pennsylvania, U.S.	
95	Win	81–6–8	George Chip	NWS	10	Jan 31, 1919	31 years, 195 days	Auditorium, Saint Paul, Minnesota, U.S.	
94	Win	80–6–8	Frank Mantell	KO	3 (10)	Oct 12, 1917	30 years, 84 days	Auditorium, Saint Paul, Minnesota, U.S.	Retained world middleweight title claim
93	Win	79–6–8	Jimmy Howard	KO	4 (10)	Sep 14, 1917	30 years, 56 days	Duluth, Minnesota, U.S.	
92	Win	78–6–8	Jack Dillon	NWS	10	Sep 3, 1917	30 years, 45 days	Fair Grounds, Terre Haute, Indiana, U.S.	
91	Win	77–6–8	George Chip	NWS	12	Jul 4, 1917	29 years, 349 days	Wright Field, Youngstown, Ohio, U.S.	World middleweight title claim at stake; (via KO only)
90	Win	76–6–8	Al Sommers	PTS	6	May 8, 1917	29 years, 292 days	Broadway Theater, Portland, Oregon, U.S.	
89	Win	75–6–8	Ray Campbell	PTS	4	May 4, 1917	29 years, 288 days	Arena, Vancouver, British Columbia, Canada	
88	Win	74–6–8	Harry Greb	NWS	6	Feb 10, 1917	29 years, 205 days	National A.C., Philadelphia, Pennsylvania, U.S.	
87	Win	73–6–8	Clay Turner	NWS	4	Dec 8, 1916	29 years, 141 days	Sioux City, Iowa, U.S.	
86	Win	72–6–8	Jack Dillon	NWS	10	Nov 10, 1916	29 years, 113 days	Auditorium, Saint Paul, Minnesota, U.S.	
85	Win	71–6–8	Ted "Kid" Lewis	NWS	10	May 18, 1916	28 years, 303 days	Madison Square Garden, New York City, New York, U.S.	World middleweight title claim at stake; (via KO only)
84	Win	70–6–8	Jeff Smith	NWS	10	Mar 17, 1916	28 years, 241 days	Auditorium, Saint Paul, Minnesota, U.S.	World middleweight title claim at stake; (via KO only)
83	Win	69–6–8	Young Ahearn	KO	1 (10)	Jan 18, 1916	28 years, 182 days	Auditorium, Saint Paul, Minnesota, U.S.	Won world middleweight title claim
82	Loss	68–6–8	Packey McFarland	NWS	10	Sep 11, 1915	28 years, 53 days	Brighton Beach Motordrome, New York City, New York, U.S.	
81	Loss	68–5–8	Jakob "Soldier" Bartfield	NWS	10	May 31, 1915	27 years, 315 days	Ebbets Field, New York City, New York, U.S.	
80	Win	68–4–8	Leo Florian Hauck	NWS	10	May 26, 1915	27 years, 310 days	St. Nicholas Arena, New York City, New York, U.S.	
79	Win	67–4–8	Eddie McGoorty	NWS	10	Mar 2, 1915	27 years, 225 days	Arena, Hudson, Wisconsin, U.S.	
78	Win	66–4–8	Jimmy Clabby	NWS	10	Jan 21, 1915	27 years, 185 days	Auditorium, Milwaukee, Wisconsin, U.S.	
77	Win	65–4–8	Willie K.O. Brennan	NWS	10	Dec 14, 1914	27 years, 147 days	Elmwood Music Hall, Buffalo, New York, U.S.	
76	Win	64–4–8	Bob Moha	DQ	2 (10)	Dec 4, 1914	27 years, 137 days	Arena, Hudson, Wisconsin, U.S.	
75	Win	63–4–8	Young Mike Donovan	TKO	6 (10)	Nov 9, 1914	27 years, 112 days	Madison Square Garden, New York City, New York, U.S.	
74	Win	62–4–8	Billy Maxwell	NWS	10	Oct 27, 1914	27 years, 99 days	Broadway S.C., New York City, New York, U.S.	
73	Win	61–4–8	Bill MacKinnon	NWS	10	Sep 21, 1914	27 years, 63 days	Covington, Kentucky, U.S.	
72	Win	60–4–8	George K.O. Brown	NWS	10	Sep 7, 1914	27 years, 49 days	Benton Harbor, Michigan, U.S.	
71	Win	59–4–8	George K.O. Brown	PTS	12	Jun 9, 1914	26 years, 324 days	Arena, Boston, Massachusetts, U.S.	
70	Win	58–4–8	Vic Hansen	TKO	6 (10)	May 29, 1914	26 years, 313 days	15th Street Garage, Kansas City, Missouri, U.S.	
69	Win	57–4–8	Johnny "Kid" Alberts	NWS	10	May 26, 1914	26 years, 310 days	Alhambra Rink, Syracuse, New York, U.S.	
68	Win	56–4–8	Johnny Howard	NWS	10	May 5, 1914	26 years, 289 days	Broadway S.C., New York City, New York, U.S.	
67	Win	55–4–8	Gus Christie	NWS	10	Mar 24, 1914	26 years, 247 days	Arena, Hudson, Wisconsin, U.S.	
66	Win	54–4–8	Al McCoy	NWS	10	Feb 23, 1914	26 years, 218 days	Irving A.C., New York City, New York, U.S.	
65	Win	53–4–8	Perry "Kid" Graves	NWS	6	Feb 16, 1914	26 years, 211 days	Olympia A.C., Philadelphia, Pennsylvania, U.S.	
64	Win	52–4–8	Bob McAllister	KO	7 (10)	Jan 12, 1914	26 years, 176 days	Madison Square Garden, New York City, New York, U.S.	
63	Win	51–4–8	Joe Hirst	NWS	6	Dec 15, 1913	26 years, 148 days	Olympia A.C., Philadelphia, Pennsylvania, U.S.	
62	Win	50–4–8	Wildcat Ferns	TKO	2 (10)	Dec 10, 1913	26 years, 143 days	Pelican Stadium, New Orleans, Louisiana, U.S.	
61	Win	49–4–8	Marty Rowan	TKO	2 (10)	Nov 14, 1913	26 years, 117 days	Twyford A.C., New York City, New York, U.S.	
60	Win	48–4–8	Emmett "Kid" Wagner	KO	9 (10)	Oct 30, 1913	26 years, 102 days	Coliseum A.C., Wilkes-Barre, Pennsylvania, U.S.	
59	Win	47–4–8	Spike Kelly	NWS	10	Oct 9, 1913	26 years, 81 days	Kenosha A.C., Kenosha, Wisconsin, U.S.	American welterweight title at stake; (via KO only)
58	Win	46–4–8	Young Ahearn	KO	4 (10)	Jun 13, 1913	25 years, 328 days	Madison Square Garden, New York City, New York, U.S.	
57	Win	45–4–8	Joe White	PTS	12	Jun 3, 1913	25 years, 318 days	Arena, Boston, Massachusetts, U.S.	
56	Win	44–4–8	Jimmy Perry	TKO	2 (6)	May 29, 1913	25 years, 313 days	Exposition Hall, Pittsburgh, Pennsylvania, U.S.	
55	Win	43–4–8	Jack McCarron	NWS	10	May 16, 1913	25 years, 300 days	Madison Square Garden, New York City, New York, U.S.	
54	Win	42–4–8	Gus Christie	PTS	12	May 13, 1913	25 years, 297 days	Arena, Boston, Massachusetts, U.S.	
53	Loss	41–4–8	Eddie McGoorty	NWS	10	Dec 4, 1912	25 years, 137 days	Madison Square Garden, New York City, New York, U.S.	
52	Loss	41–3–8	Jack McCarron	NWS	6	Nov 20, 1912	25 years, 123 days	National A.C., Philadelphia, Pennsylvania, U.S.	
51	Win	41–2–8	Tommy Maloney	NWS	10	Sep 23, 1912	25 years, 65 days	Madison Square Garden, New York City, New York, U.S.	
50	Win	40–2–8	Young McCartney	KO	2 (6)	Sep 14, 1912	25 years, 56 days	National A.C., Philadelphia, Pennsylvania, U.S.	
49	Win	39–2–8	Sid Burns	RTD	5 (10)	Jul 1, 1912	24 years, 347 days	Madison Square Garden, New York City, New York, U.S.	
48	Win	38–2–8	Joe Stein	NWS	10	Jun 25, 1912	24 years, 341 days	St. Nicholas Arena, New York City, New York, U.S.	
47	Win	37–2–8	Tommy Connors	NWS	10	Jun 10, 1912	24 years, 326 days	Irving A.C., New York City, New York, U.S.	
46	Win	36–2–8	Willie K.O. Brennan	PTS	10	May 31, 1912	24 years, 316 days	Victor A.C., Cleveland, Ohio, U.S.	
45	Win	35–2–8	Paddy Lavin	TKO	8 (10)	May 14, 1912	24 years, 299 days	Convention Hall, Buffalo, New York, U.S.	
44	Win	34–2–8	Jeff Smith	NWS	10	Apr 11, 1912	24 years, 266 days	New Amsterdam Opera House, New York City, New York, U.S.	
43	Win	33–2–8	Jack Denning	NWS	10	Mar 26, 1912	24 years, 250 days	Fairmont A.C., New York City, New York, U.S.	
42	Win	32–2–8	Willie Lewis	KO	2 (10)	Feb 23, 1912	24 years, 218 days	Empire A.C., New York City, New York, U.S.	
41	Win	31–2–8	Tommy Howell	NWS	6	Feb 17, 1912	24 years, 212 days	National A.C., Philadelphia, Pennsylvania, U.S.	
40	Win	30–2–8	Freddie Hicks	NWS	10	Feb 13, 1912	24 years, 208 days	Fairmont A.C., New York City, New York, U.S.	
39	Win	29–2–8	Mike Cashman	TKO	4 (10)	Feb 7, 1912	24 years, 202 days	Empire A.C., New York City, New York, U.S.	
38	Draw	28–2–8	Jack Denning	NWS	10	Jan 23, 1912	24 years, 187 days	Fairmont A.C., New York City, New York, U.S.	
37	Draw	28–2–7	Young Erne	NWS	6	Dec 16, 1911	24 years, 149 days	National A.C., Philadelphia, Pennsylvania, U.S.	
36	Win	28–2–6	Frank Perron	KO	9 (15)	Dec 12, 1911	24 years, 145 days	Rhode Island A.C., Thornton, Rhode Island, U.S.	
35	Win	27–2–6	Walter Coffey	NWS	10	Dec 5, 1911	24 years, 138 days	Fairmont A.C., New York City, New York, U.S.	
34	Win	26–2–6	Willie Lewis	NWS	10	Nov 28, 1911	24 years, 131 days	Fairmont A.C., New York City, New York, U.S.	
33	Win	25–2–6	Billy Sherman	TKO	4 (10)	Nov 10, 1911	24 years, 113 days	New Polo A.C., New York City, New York, U.S.	
32	Draw	24–2–6	Hilliard Lang	NWS	15	Oct 17, 1911	24 years, 89 days	Auditorium Rink, Winnipeg, Manitoba, Canada	
31	Draw	24–2–5	Jimmy Clabby	NWS	15	Sep 29, 1911	24 years, 71 days	Auditorium Rink, Winnipeg, Manitoba, Canada	
30	Loss	24–2–4	Jimmy Clabby	NWS	10	Sep 1, 1911	24 years, 43 days	Terminal Building, Milwaukee, Wisconsin, U.S.	
29	Win	24–1–4	Hilliard Lang	TKO	10 (15)	Aug 24, 1911	24 years, 35 days	Auditorium Rink, Winnipeg, Manitoba, Canada	
28	Win	23–1–4	Young Kid Broad	KO	13 (15)	Jul 4, 1911	23 years, 349 days	Auditorium Rink, Winnipeg, Manitoba, Canada	
27	Win	22–1–4	Joe Wilson	KO	8 (10)	Jun 16, 1911	23 years, 331 days	Auditorium Rink, Winnipeg, Manitoba, Canada	
26	Win	21–1–4	Gus Christie	NWS	10	May 5, 1911	23 years, 289 days	Terminal Building, Milwaukee, Wisconsin, U.S.	
25	Win	20–1–4	Gus Christie	NWS	8	Apr 17, 1911	23 years, 271 days	Public Service Building, Milwaukee, Wisconsin, U.S.	
24	Win	19–1–4	Freddie Hicks	PTS	8	Mar 26, 1911	23 years, 249 days	Minneapolis, Minnesota, U.S.	
23	Win	18–1–4	Art Godfrey	KO	14 (15)	Mar 15, 1911	23 years, 238 days	Minneapolis, Minnesota, U.S.	
22	Win	17–1–4	Kid Grantly	KO	5 (10)	Jan 8, 1911	23 years, 172 days	Minneapolis, Minnesota, U.S.	
21	Win	16–1–4	Al Hoppe	KO	3 (10)	Dec 2, 1910	23 years, 135 days	Hibbing, Minnesota, U.S.	
20	Draw	15–1–4	Jack Doyle	PTS	10	Nov 13, 1910	23 years, 116 days	Cooke's Gym, Minneapolis, Minnesota, U.S.	
19	Draw	15–1–3	Jack Doyle	PTS	15	Sep 23, 1910	23 years, 65 days	Duluth, Minnesota, U.S.	
18	Win	15–1–2	Jack Parres	KO	3 (10)	Jul 4, 1910	22 years, 349 days	Minneapolis, Minnesota, U.S.	
17	Draw	14–1–2	Herbert Catherwood	PTS	10	May 4, 1910	22 years, 288 days	Minneapolis, Minnesota, U.S.	
16	Win	14–1–1	Kid Grantly	KO	9 (10)	Jan 10, 1910	22 years, 174 days	Saint Paul, Minnesota, U.S.	
15	Win	13–1–1	Jack Doyle	PTS	10	Nov 1, 1909	22 years, 104 days	Saint Paul, Minnesota, U.S.	
14	Loss	12–1–1	Jimmy Clabby	PTS	10	Sep 11, 1909	22 years, 53 days	Saint Paul, Minnesota, U.S.	
13	Win	12–0–1	Jimmy Bartos	PTS	6	Aug 21, 1909	22 years, 32 days	Hudson, Wisconsin, U.S.	
12	Win	11–0–1	Theodore Thompson	PTS	6	Jun 4, 1909	21 years, 319 days	Saint Paul, Minnesota, U.S.	
11	Win	10–0–1	Roy Moore	PTS	10	Apr 12, 1909	21 years, 266 days	Saint Paul, Minnesota, U.S.	
10	Win	9–0–1	Art Godfrey	KO	1 (10)	Mar 1, 1909	21 years, 224 days	Saint Paul, Minnesota, U.S.	
9	Win	8–0–1	George Brown	KO	1 (6)	Jan 5, 1909	21 years, 169 days	Saint Paul, Minnesota, U.S.	
8	Win	7–0–1	Theodore Thompson	PTS	6	Nov 10, 1908	21 years, 113 days	Saint Paul, Minnesota, U.S.	
7	Win	6–0–1	Con Holland	PTS	6	Jun 24, 1908	20 years, 340 days	Saint Paul, Minnesota, U.S.	
6	Win	5–0–1	Jimmy Bartos	PTS	6	Jun 1, 1908	20 years, 317 days	Saint Paul, Minnesota, U.S.	
5	Win	4–0–1	Mike Brown	PTS	6	Apr 30, 1908	20 years, 285 days	Saint Paul, Minnesota, U.S.	
4	Win	3–0–1	Otto Herwig	PTS	10	Apr 1, 1908	20 years, 256 days	Minneapolis, Minnesota, U.S.	
3	Draw	2–0–1	Herbert Catherwood	PTS	15	Mar 2, 1908	20 years, 226 days	Saint Paul, Minnesota, U.S.	
2	Win	2–0	Roy Moore	KO	3 (6)	Jan 11, 1908	20 years, 175 days	Saint Paul, Minnesota, U.S.	
1	Win	1–0	Newsboy Brown	PTS	6	Dec 1, 1907	20 years, 134 days	Saint Paul, Minnesota, U.S.	Exact date uncertain; Professional debut

== Publications ==
- Gibbons, Mike (1922) How To Train: Complete Instructions on Preparing for Boxing, St. Paul, Minnesota, Gibbons Athletic Association
- Gibbons, Mike (1923) How To Box: Complete Instructions on Scientific Boxing, St. Paul, Minnesota, Gibbons Athletic Association
