= J. J. Nelson =

American football player (born 1992)

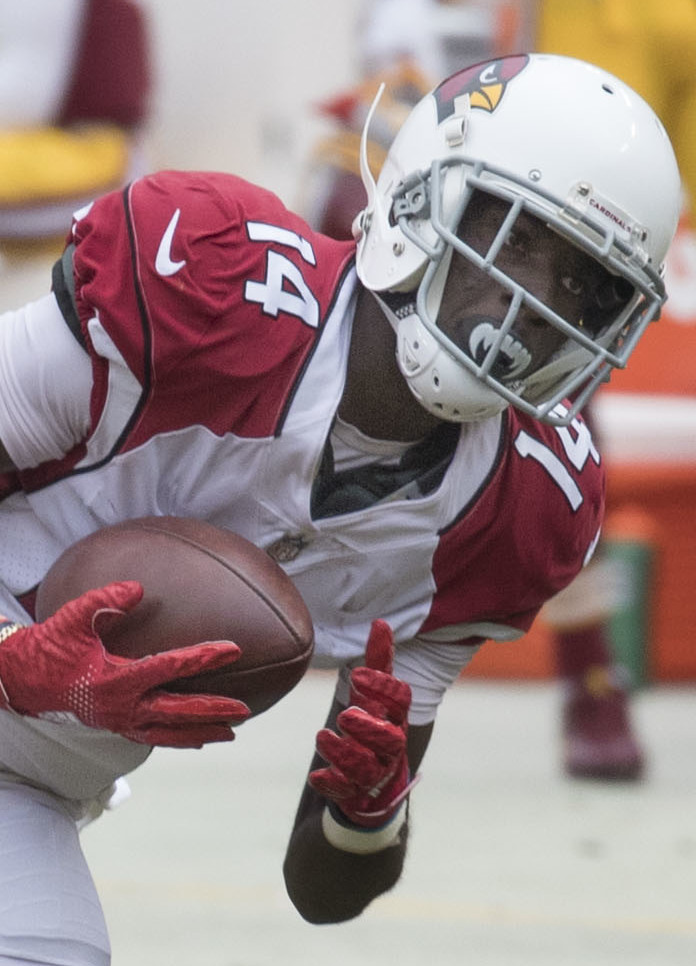
- Nelson with the Arizona Cardinals in 2017

No. 14, 15
- Position: Wide receiver

Personal information
- Born: April 24, 1992 (age 34); Midfield, Alabama, U.S.
- Listed height: 5 ft 10 in (1.78 m)
- Listed weight: 160 lb (73 kg)

Career information
- High school: Midfield
- College: UAB (2010–2014)
- NFL draft: 2015: 5th round, 159th overall pick

Career history
- Arizona Cardinals (2015–2018); Oakland Raiders (2019); San Francisco 49ers (2020)*; Buffalo Bills (2020)*; Indianapolis Colts (2021)
- * Offseason or practice squad member only

Awards and highlights
- First-team All-American (2014); First-team All-C-USA (2014); C-USA Special Teams Player of the Year (2014); Second-team All-C-USA (2013)

Career NFL statistics
- Receptions: 85
- Receiving yards: 1,475
- Receiving average: 17.4
- Rushing yards: 120
- Return yards: 66
- Total touchdowns: 11
- Stats at Pro Football Reference

Jamarcus Jermaine Nelson (born April 24, 1992) is an American former professional football player who was a wide receiver in the National Football League (NFL). He played college football for the UAB Blazers, earning first-team All-American honors in 2014. He was selected by the Arizona Cardinals in the fifth round of the 2015 NFL draft. He was also a member the Oakland Raiders, San Francisco 49ers, Buffalo Bills and Indianapolis Colts.

== Early life ==
Nelson attended Midfield High School in Midfield, Alabama, where he led them to the state Class 4A quarterfinals after finishing 11–2 during the regular season in 2009, recording 55 catches, 1,049 yards, 214 yards rushing, five interceptions, and 19 touchdowns. He was named The Birmingham News Metro-West Player of the Year. He was listed as the No. 27 state prospect on Birmingham News Super Seniors list and was selected to The Birmingham News All-Metro West Offensive Team. He was also named to the ASWA First-team All-State.

As a track & field star, Nelson was a two-time Class 4A state champion in the 100-meter dash (best of 10.49 seconds). He also captured the 200-meter dash title with a time of 21.76 seconds. In addition, he was a highly regarded basketball player for Midfield, earning team MVP and All-region honors. He was a two-year letterwinner in both track and basketball.

== College career ==
Nelson was named a member of the 2014 College Football All-America Team by the Walter Camp Foundation, USA Today, and CBS Sports as a kick returner. Nelson was also Conference USA special teams player of the year and first-team All-conference as a wide receiver.

== Professional career ==
=== Pre-draft ===
At the 2015 NFL Scouting Combine, Nelson had the fastest 40-yard dash with a time of 4.28 seconds, .04 seconds shy of the then-combine record of 4.24 seconds held then by Chris Johnson.

Pre-draft measurables
Height	Weight	Arm length	Hand span	40-yard dash	10-yard split	20-yard split	20-yard shuttle	Three-cone drill	Vertical jump	Broad jump
5 ft 10 1/4 in (1.78 m)	156 lb (71 kg)	31 1/8 in (0.79 m)	8 1/4 in (0.21 m)	4.28 s	1.49 s	2.51 s	4.15 s	7.02 s	36 in (0.91 m)	10 ft 7 in (3.23 m)
All values from NFL Combine

=== Arizona Cardinals ===
Nelson was drafted by the Arizona Cardinals in the fifth round, 159th overall, of the 2015 NFL draft. In a 2015 game against the Cincinnati Bengals, Nelson scored his first career touchdown with a pass from quarterback Carson Palmer. He finished his rookie year with 11 receptions for 299 yards and two touchdowns. In 2016, Nelson played in 15 games with six starts, recording 34 catches for 568 yards and six touchdowns. He also had four rushing attempts for 83 yards and a touchdown including a run for 56 yards for the touchdown in Week 14. In Week 2 of the 2017 season, Nelson recorded five receptions for 120 yards, including a 45-yard touchdown catch in Arizona's 16–13 overtime win over the Indianapolis Colts. Nelson finished as the Week 2 yardage leader among all eligible receivers and won NFC Offensive Player of the Week. In 2018, Nelson had a career-low seven receptions for 64 yards and no touchdowns on the season.

=== Oakland Raiders ===
On March 15, 2019, Nelson signed with the Oakland Raiders. In week 3 against the Minnesota Vikings, Nelson caught four passes for 36 yards and his first receiving touchdown of the season as the Raiders lost 34–14. He was released by the Raiders on October 10.

=== San Francisco 49ers ===
Nelson was signed by the San Francisco 49ers on August 15, 2020. He was placed on injured reserve on August 30, due to a knee injury. Nelson was released by San Francisco with an injury settlement on September 6.

=== Buffalo Bills ===
On January 1, 2021, Nelson signed with the practice squad of the Buffalo Bills, and was released three days later.

=== Indianapolis Colts ===
On February 1, 2021, Nelson signed a reserve/future contract with the Indianapolis Colts. He was placed on injured reserve on August 6. Nelson was released by the Colts on November 1.
