= Midfielder (disambiguation) =

A midfielder is a position in association football.

Midfielder may also refer to:

- Midfielder (Australian rules football), a centre or wingman in Australian rules football
- Midfielder (bandy), a position in bandy
- Midfielder (Baseball5), a fielding position in Baseball5
- Midfielder (lacrosse), a position in lacrosse
- Midfielder (rugby union), a centre in rugby union
- A general sports term for a player who occupies a position in the midfield
