= Jimmy Clabby =

American boxer

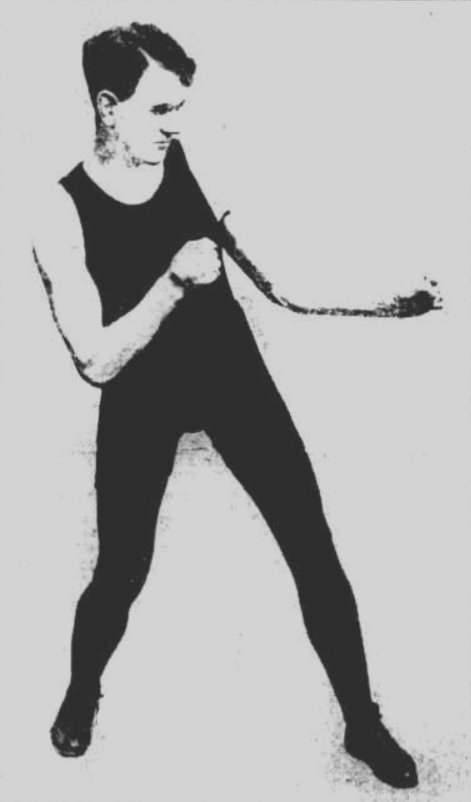
Jimmy Clabby, 1921.

Jimmy Clabby (14 July 1890 – c. January 1934) was an American boxer. He defeated Tommy Uren in 1917 to win the Australian middleweight championship. He was found dead, of starvation and exposure, at his home in Calumet City, Illinois, near Hammond, in January 1934; in his obituary it was estimated that he had earned and spent over $500,000 during his career as a boxer. He claimed that his usual way to prepare for a fight was "a shave and a drink". He was married and had three children. Known as the Indiana Wasp and the Indiana Cyclone, he was inducted into the International Boxing Hall of Fame in 2026.
