= Midfield, Alabama =

Town in Alabama, United States

- Town
- Location of Midfield in Jefferson County, Alabama.
- Coordinates: 33°27′21″N 86°55′37″W
- Country: United States
- State: Alabama
- County: Jefferson

Area
  - Total: 2.66 sq mi (6.88 km^{2})
  - Land: 2.66 sq mi (6.88 km^{2})
  - Water: 0 sq mi (0.00 km^{2})
- Elevation: 525 ft (160 m)

Population (2020)
  - Total: 5,211
  - Density: 1,960.8/sq mi (757.06/km^{2})
- Time zone: UTC-6 (Central Time Zone)
  - Summer (DST): UTC-5 (CDT)
- ZIP code: 35228
- Area codes: 205 & 659
- FIPS code: 01-48376
- GNIS feature ID: 2404254
- Website: www.cityofmidfield.com

Midfield is a town in Jefferson County, Alabama, United States, located two miles south of the Birmingham suburb of Fairfield. It incorporated in 1953. As of the 2020 census, it had a population of 5,211.

== Geography ==
According to the U.S. Census Bureau, this town has a total area of about 2.6 square miles (6.7 km^{2}), all land.

== Demographics ==
Historical population
Census	Pop.	Note	%±
1960	3,556		—
1970	6,621		86.2%
1980	6,182		−6.6%
1990	5,559		−10.1%
2000	5,626		1.2%
2010	5,365		−4.6%
2020	5,211		−2.9%
U.S. Decennial Census; 2013 Estimate

=== 2020 census ===
Midfield city, Alabama – Racial and ethnic composition Note: the US Census treats Hispanic/Latino as an ethnic category. This table excludes Latinos from the racial categories and assigns them to a separate category. Hispanics/Latinos may be of any race.
Race / Ethnicity (NH = Non-Hispanic)	Pop 2000	Pop 2010	Pop 2020	% 2000	% 2010	% 2020
White alone (NH)	2,207	845	422	39.23%	15.75%	8.10%
Black or African American alone (NH)	3,346	4,374	4,379	59.47%	81.53%	84.03%
Native American or Alaska Native alone (NH)	5	3	15	0.09%	0.06%	0.29%
Asian alone (NH)	24	12	6	0.43%	0.22%	0.12%
Native Hawaiian or Pacific Islander alone (NH)	1	0	1	0.02%	0.00%	0.02%
Other race alone (NH)	3	6	14	0.05%	0.11%	0.27%
Mixed race or Multiracial (NH)	32	48	94	0.57%	0.89%	1.80%
Hispanic or Latino (any race)	8	77	280	0.14%	1.44%	5.37%
Total	5,626	5,365	5,211	100.00%	100.00%	100.00%

As of the 2020 United States census, there were 5,211 people, 1,855 households, and 1,273 families residing in the city.

=== 2010 census ===
As of the census of 2010, there were 5,365 people, 1,999 households, and 1,398 families residing in this town. The population density was 2,063.5 inhabitants per square mile (796.7/km^{2}). There were 2,330 housing units at an average density of 896.2 per square mile (346.0/km^{2}). The racial makeup of the city was 81.6% Black or African American, 16.4% White, 0.1% Native American, 0.2% Asian, 0.0% Pacific Islander, 0.7% from other races, and 0.9% from two or more races. 1.4% of the population were Hispanic or Latino of any race.

There were 1,999 households, out of which 32.4% had children under the age of 18 living with them, 32.3% were married couples living together, 31.2% had a female householder with no husband present, and 30.1% were non-families. 25.7% of all households were made up of individuals, and 8.3% had someone living alone who was 65 years of age or older. The average household size was 2.68 and the average family size was 3.24.

In the town the population was distributed with 27.7% under the age of 18, 10.3% from 18 to 24, 25.1% from 25 to 44, 27.8% from 45 to 64, and 9.1% who were 65 years of age or older. The median age was 34.4 years. For every 100 females, there were 82.8 males. For every 100 females age 18 and over, there were 81.2 males.

The median income for a household in the city was $37,138, and the median income for a family was $46,444. Males had a median income of $39,420 versus $28,648 for females. The per capita income for the city was $16,496. About 15.6% of families and 15.9% of the population were below the poverty line, including 21.9% of those under age 18 and 12.1% of those age 65 or over.

=== 2000 census ===
As of the census of 2000, there were 5,626 people, 2,186 households, and 1,532 families residing in this town. The population density was 2,167.1 inhabitants per square mile (836.7/km^{2}). There were 2,393 housing units at an average density of 921.8 per square mile (355.9/km^{2}). The racial makeup of the city was 39.28% White, 59.49% Black or African American, 0.09% Native American, 0.43% Asian, 0.04% Pacific Islander, 0.11% from other races, and 0.57% from two or more races. 0.14% of the population were Hispanic or Latino of any race.

There were 2,186 households, out of which 36.3% had children under the age of 18 living with them, 44.4% were married couples living together, 21.5% had a female householder with no husband present, and 29.9% were non-families. 27.0% of all households were made up of individuals, and 12.6% had someone living alone who was 65 years of age or older. The average household size was 2.57 and the average family size was 3.13.

In the town the population was distributed with 28.8% under the age of 18, 7.9% from 18 to 24, 30.8% from 25 to 44, 19.4% from 45 to 64, and 13.1% who were 65 years of age or older. The median age was 35 years. For every 100 females, there were 85.6 males. For every 100 females age 18 and over, there were 79.2 males.

The median income for a household in the city was $31,378, and the median income for a family was $36,281. Males had a median income of $30,087 versus $25,386 for females. The per capita income for the city was $15,729. About 12.4% of families and 16.0% of the population were below the poverty line, including 22.1% of those under age 18 and 7.7% of those age 65 or over.

== Notable people ==
- Ron Casey, former editor for the Birmingham News
- Michael Gibbons, American boxer
- J. J. Nelson, All-American wide receiver for the UAB Blazers
