= Arthur Susskind =

American boxer (1886–1967)

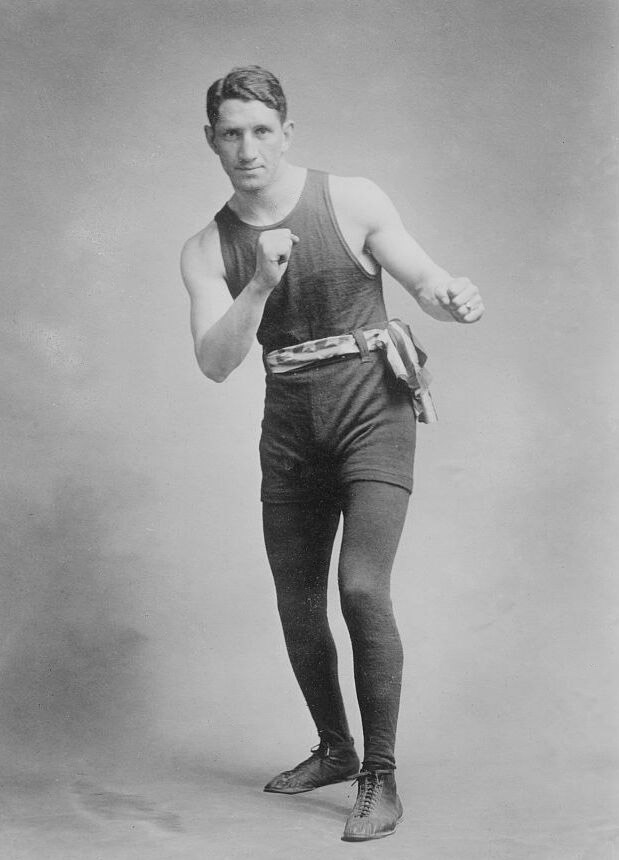

Personal information
- Nickname: Young Otto
- Nationality: American
- Born: November 12, 1886
- Died: March 10, 1967 (aged 80)
- Height: 5 ft 6 in (168 cm)
- Weight: Light welterweight

Boxing career
- Stance: Orthodox

Boxing record
- Total fights: 164; with the inclusion of newspaper decisions
- Wins: 115
- Win by KO: 60
- Losses: 32
- Draws: 15
- No contests: 2

Arthur Susskind (October 12, 1886 – March 10, 1967), also known as "Young Otto", was an American professional boxer who set a world record with 16 consecutive first-round knockouts in the early 1900s. His record stood until 2006, when Edwin Valero of Venezuela scored his 18th straight first-round knockout.

== Professional boxing record ==
All information in this section is derived from BoxRec, unless otherwise stated.

=== Official Record ===
164 fights	71 wins	13 losses
By knockout	60	6
By decision	11	7
Draws	3	
No contests	2	
Newspaper decisions/draws	75	

All newspaper decisions are officially regarded as “no decision” bouts and are not counted as a win, loss or draw.

No.	Result	Record	Opponent	Type	Round	Date	Age	Location	Notes
164	Loss	71–13–3 (77)	Jimmy Gardy	PTS	10	Feb 1, 1923	36 years, 111 days	102nd Medical Regiment Armory, New York City, New York, U.S.	
163	Loss	71–12–3 (77)	Billy Calpin	TKO	3 (10)	Dec 21, 1922	36 years, 69 days	Town Hall, Scranton, Pennsylvania, U.S.	
162	Win	71–11–3 (77)	Willie Roller	KO	2 (10)	Dec 4, 1922	36 years, 52 days	New York City, New York, U.S.	
161	Loss	70–11–3 (77)	Rube Cohen	PTS	10	Nov 8, 1922	36 years, 26 days	Armory, Schenectady, New York, U.S.	
160	Win	70–10–3 (77)	Barry Norton	KO	3 (10)	Sep 20, 1922	35 years, 342 days	Mitchel Field Arena, Mineola, New York, U.S.	
159	Win	69–10–3 (77)	Joey Werner	PTS	12	Aug 4, 1922	35 years, 295 days	15th Regiment Armory, New York City, New York, U.S.	
158	Loss	68–10–3 (77)	Louis Tasiero	PTS	6	Jul 29, 1922	35 years, 289 days	Queensboro Stadium, New York City, New York, U.S.	
157	Win	68–9–3 (77)	Joe Weber	PTS	8	May 20, 1922	35 years, 219 days	Queensboro Stadium, New York City, New York, U.S.	
156	Win	67–9–3 (77)	Joe Connors	KO	2 (10)	May 4, 1922	35 years, 203 days	United States of America	
155	Draw	66–9–3 (77)	Joe Fox	PTS	12	Apr 28, 1922	35 years, 197 days	15th Regiment Armory, New York City, New York, U.S.	
154	Win	66–9–2 (77)	Eddie Hogan	KO	4 (10)	Apr 14, 1922	35 years, 183 days	New York City, New York, U.S.	
153	Win	65–9–2 (77)	Johnny Fagan	KO	2 (10)	Apr 8, 1922	35 years, 177 days	47th Regiment Armory, New York City, New York, U.S.	
152	Win	64–9–2 (77)	Ned Cowler	KO	4 (10)	Mar 24, 1922	35 years, 162 days	15th Regiment Armory, New York City, New York, U.S.	
151	Win	63–9–2 (77)	Jack Miller	KO	1 (10)	Mar 17, 1922	35 years, 155 days	15th Regiment Armory, New York City, New York, U.S.	
150	Win	62–9–2 (77)	Frank Baker	KO	1 (10)	Jan 30, 1919	32 years, 109 days	United States of America	
149	Win	61–9–2 (77)	Willie Scott	KO	1 (10)	Jan 24, 1919	32 years, 103 days	Passaic, New Jersey, U.S.	
148	Win	60–9–2 (77)	Mike Sheehy	KO	1 (10)	Nov 24, 1917	31 years, 42 days	New York City, New York, U.S.	
147	Win	59–9–2 (77)	Denny Coakley	KO	1 (10)	Nov 12, 1917	31 years, 30 days	New York City, New York, U.S.	
146	Win	58–9–2 (77)	Jack Sheldon	NWS	10	Nov 5, 1917	31 years, 23 days	New York City, New York, U.S.	
145	Win	58–9–2 (76)	Young Billy Papke	NWS	10	Oct 29, 1917	31 years, 16 days	Yorkville A.C., New York City, New York, U.S.	
144	Loss	58–9–2 (75)	Johnny Martin	PTS	10	Jun 4, 1917	30 years, 234 days	Casino Hall, Bridgeport, Connecticut, U.S.	
143	Loss	58–8–2 (75)	Young Joe Rivers	NWS	12	May 28, 1917	30 years, 227 days	Whip City A.C., Westfield, Massachusetts, U.S.	
142	Win	58–8–2 (74)	Jimmy Flynn	NWS	10	May 21, 1917	30 years, 220 days	Yorkville A.C., New York City, New York, U.S.	
141	Win	58–8–2 (73)	Eddie Wald	KO	1 (10)	May 4, 1917	30 years, 203 days	United States of America	
140	Win	57–8–2 (73)	Jimmy Flynn	NWS	10	Apr 30, 1917	30 years, 199 days	New York City, New York, U.S.	
139	Win	57–8–2 (72)	Oakland Frankie Burns	NWS	10	Feb 26, 1917	30 years, 136 days	Yorkville A.C., New York City, New York, U.S.	
138	Win	57–8–2 (71)	Danny Cronin	KO	1 (10)	Jan 20, 1917	30 years, 99 days	United States of America	
137	Win	56–8–2 (71)	Dummy Burns	NWS	10	Jan 8, 1917	30 years, 87 days	Yorkville A.C., New York City, New York, U.S.	
136	ND	56–8–2 (70)	Harry Champ Segal	ND	10	Oct 17, 1916	30 years, 4 days	Hunts Point A.C., New York City, New York, U.S.	
135	Loss	56–8–2 (69)	Harry Pierce	KO	8 (10)	Jul 25, 1916	29 years, 286 days	Harlem-Rockaway S.C., New York City, New York, U.S.	
134	Win	56–7–2 (69)	Allie Nack	NWS	10	Jul 1, 1916	29 years, 262 days	Fairmont A.C., New York City, New York, U.S.	
133	Loss	56–7–2 (68)	Westside Jimmy Duffy	NWS	10	May 22, 1916	29 years, 222 days	Olympic A.C., New York City, New York, U.S.	
132	Draw	56–7–2 (67)	Young Blades	PTS	10	Jan 25, 1916	29 years, 104 days	Pawtucket, Rhode Island, U.S.	
131	Loss	56–7–1 (67)	Chick Simler	NWS	10	Jan 22, 1916	29 years, 101 days	Queensboro A.C., New York City, New York, U.S.	
130	Win	56–7–1 (66)	Andy Wright	KO	1 (10)	Jan 14, 1916	29 years, 93 days	New York City, New York, U.S.	
129	Win	55–7–1 (66)	Eddie Carroll	KO	1 (10)	Oct 30, 1915	29 years, 17 days	United States of America	
128	Win	54–7–1 (66)	Battling Murphy	KO	3 (10)	Oct 18, 1915	29 years, 5 days	United States of America	
127	Win	53–7–1 (66)	Chick Simler	NWS	10	Oct 2, 1915	28 years, 354 days	Queensboro A.C., New York City, New York, U.S.	
126	Draw	53–7–1 (65)	Willie Schaefer	NWS	10	May 22, 1915	28 years, 221 days	New York City, New York, U.S.	
125	Draw	53–7–1 (64)	Hal Stewart	NWS	10	Apr 14, 1915	28 years, 183 days	Auditorium, Lima, Ohio, U.S.	
124	Draw	53–7–1 (63)	Battling Murphy	PTS	10	Mar 29, 1915	28 years, 167 days	United States of America	
123	Win	53–7 (63)	Battling Terry	PTS	10	Mar 10, 1915	28 years, 148 days	Akron, Ohio, U.S.	
122	Win	52–7 (63)	Dick Peters	NWS	10	Dec 5, 1914	28 years, 53 days	Queensboro A.C., New York City, New York, U.S.	
121	Win	52–7 (62)	Young Dyson	NWS	10	Oct 20, 1914	28 years, 7 days	Brown's Gym A.A., New York City, New York, U.S.	
120	Win	52–7 (61)	Joe Hyland	NWS	?	Aug 4, 1914	27 years, 295 days	Atlantic A.A., New York City, New York, U.S.	
119	Win	52–7 (60)	Joe Bailey	KO	1 (10)	May 6, 1914	27 years, 205 days	Coney Island, New York City, New York, U.S.	
118	Win	51–7 (60)	Johnny Schumacher	NWS	10	Apr 21, 1914	27 years, 190 days	New York City, New York, U.S.	
117	Loss	51–7 (59)	Cy Smith	NWS	10	Mar 24, 1914	27 years, 162 days	Brown's Gym A.A., New York City, New York, U.S.	
116	Win	51–7 (58)	Dodo Maher	NWS	10	Mar 16, 1914	27 years, 154 days	Armory, Norwalk, Virginia, U.S.	
115	Loss	51–7 (57)	Mike Mazie	NWS	10	Feb 12, 1914	27 years, 122 days	Madison Square Garden, New York City, New York, U.S.	
114	Win	51–7 (56)	Young Keats	KO	1 (10)	Jan 20, 1914	27 years, 99 days	Brown's Gym A.A., New York City, New York, U.S.	
113	Win	50–7 (56)	Andy Cortez	KO	5 (10)	Dec 17, 1913	27 years, 65 days	Windsor Locks, Connecticut, U.S.	
112	Draw	49–7 (56)	Johnny Lore	NWS	6	Nov 27, 1913	27 years, 45 days	Queensboro A.C., New York City, New York, U.S.	
111	Win	49–7 (55)	Eddie Conway	NWS	6	Nov 8, 1913	27 years, 26 days	Queensboro A.C., New York City, New York, U.S.	
110	Loss	49–7 (54)	Charley Turner	NWS	6	Nov 7, 1913	27 years, 25 days	Nonpareil A.C., Philadelphia, Pennsylvania, U.S.	
109	Win	49–7 (53)	Charley Hansen	NWS	10	Nov 1, 1913	27 years, 19 days	Fairmont A.C., New York City, New York, U.S.	
108	Win	49–7 (52)	Charley "Twin" Miller	NWS	10	Oct 16, 1913	27 years, 3 days	City A.C., New York City, New York, U.S.	
107	Loss	49–7 (51)	Harry Carter	NWS	10	Oct 11, 1913	26 years, 363 days	Queensboro A.C., New York City, New York, U.S.	
106	Win	49–7 (50)	Young Terry	NWS	6	Sep 6, 1913	26 years, 328 days	Brown's Gym A.A., New York City, New York, U.S.	
105	Win	49–7 (49)	Artie Fink	PTS	4	Jun 2, 1913	26 years, 232 days	United States of America	
104	Win	48–7 (49)	Paddy Sullivan	NWS	10	Apr 14, 1913	26 years, 183 days	Olympia Boxing Club, New York City, New York, U.S.	
103	Win	48–7 (48)	Lew McDermott	NWS	3	Jan 9, 1913	26 years, 88 days	St. Bartholomew A.C., New York City, New York, U.S.	
102	Win	48–7 (47)	Willie Schaefer	NWS	10	Dec 14, 1912	26 years, 62 days	Fairmont A.C., New York City, New York, U.S.	
101	Loss	48–7 (46)	Benny Franklin	NWS	10	May 7, 1912	25 years, 207 days	Brown's Gym A.A., New York City, New York, U.S.	
100	Win	48–7 (45)	Al McCoy	NWS	10	Mar 29, 1912	25 years, 168 days	Queensboro A.C., New York City, New York, U.S.	
99	Loss	48–7 (44)	Jack Goodman	NWS	10	Jan 22, 1912	25 years, 101 days	Olympia Boxing Club, New York City, New York, U.S.	
98	Loss	48–7 (43)	Billy Sherman	KO	2 (10)	Nov 2, 1911	25 years, 20 days	New York City, New York, U.S.	
97	Loss	48–6 (43)	Paul Köhler	PTS	10	Oct 30, 1911	25 years, 17 days	Cleveland, Ohio, U.S.	
96	Win	48–5 (43)	Benny Franklin	NWS	6	Sep 29, 1911	24 years, 351 days	New York City, New York, U.S.	
95	Draw	48–5 (42)	Kid Burns	NWS	10	Sep 18, 1911	24 years, 340 days	Fordham A.C., New York City, New York, U.S.	
94	Loss	48–5 (41)	Joe Hirst	NWS	6	Mar 29, 1911	24 years, 167 days	Armory, Rochester, New York, U.S.	
93	Loss	48–5 (40)	Unk Russell	PTS	10	Mar 14, 1911	24 years, 152 days	Grand Avenue A.C., Kansas City, Missouri, U.S.	
92	Win	48–4 (40)	Jack Savage	TKO	3 (8)	Feb 8, 1911	24 years, 118 days	National A.C., Memphis, Tennessee, U.S.	
91	Win	47–4 (40)	Eddie Webber	TKO	3 (10)	Feb 1, 1911	24 years, 111 days	National A.C., Memphis, Tennessee, U.S.	
90	Win	46–4 (40)	Jack Savage	KO	1 (10)	Jan 20, 1911	24 years, 99 days	New York City, New York, U.S.	
89	Loss	45–4 (40)	Lew Powell	NWS	10	Dec 6, 1910	24 years, 54 days	National S.C., New York City, New York, U.S.	
88	Win	45–4 (39)	Joe Sieger	NWS	10	Dec 1, 1910	24 years, 49 days	Long Acre A.C., New York City, New York, U.S.	
87	Loss	45–4 (38)	Lew Powell	NWS	10	Nov 21, 1910	24 years, 39 days	Olympia Boxing Club, New York City, New York, U.S.	
86	Loss	45–4 (37)	Leo Houck	NWS	6	Oct 1, 1910	23 years, 353 days	National A.C., Philadelphia, Pennsylvania, U.S.	
85	Win	45–4 (36)	Dick Nelson	NWS	10	May 9, 1910	23 years, 208 days	Harlem River Casino, New York City, New York, U.S.	
84	Draw	45–4 (35)	Sammy Smith	NWS	10	Apr 23, 1910	23 years, 192 days	Harlem River Casino, New York City, New York, U.S.	
83	Win	45–4 (34)	Paddy Sullivan	KO	1 (10)	Apr 13, 1910	23 years, 182 days	Sharkey A.C., New York City, New York, U.S.	
82	Win	44–4 (34)	Bobby Wilson	NWS	10	Mar 8, 1910	23 years, 146 days	American A.C., Schenectady, New York, U.S.	
81	Win	44–4 (33)	George Pardner	NWS	3	Mar 4, 1910	23 years, 142 days	St. Bartholomew A.C., New York City, New York, U.S.	
80	Win	44–4 (32)	Joe Stein	NWS	10	Jan 10, 1910	23 years, 89 days	Olympic A.C., New York City, New York, U.S.	
79	Loss	44–4 (31)	Eddie McAvoy	NWS	6	Oct 14, 1909	23 years, 1 day	Broadway A.C., Philadelphia, Pennsylvania, U.S.	
78	Loss	44–4 (30)	Johnny Marto	NWS	10	Sep 10, 1909	22 years, 332 days	Fairmont A.C., New York City, New York, U.S.	
77	Win	44–4 (29)	Paddy Lavin	NWS	6	May 29, 1909	22 years, 228 days	National A.C., Philadelphia, Pennsylvania, U.S.	
76	Loss	44–4 (28)	Young Joseph	PTS	20	Apr 26, 1909	22 years, 195 days	Wonderland, Whitechapel Road, Mile End, London, England, U.K.	For vacant world welterweight title claim
75	Win	44–3 (28)	Sid Stagg	KO	5 (10)	Mar 26, 1909	22 years, 164 days	Cosmopolitan Gymnasium, Plymouth, Devon, England, U.K.	
74	Win	43–3 (28)	George Proctor	KO	3 (10)	Mar 20, 1909	22 years, 158 days	Wonderland, Paris, France	
73	Loss	42–3 (28)	Leach Cross	KO	5 (10)	Jan 21, 1909	22 years, 100 days	Fairmont A.C., New York City, New York, U.S.	
72	Win	42–2 (28)	Paddy Sullivan	NWS	10	Jan 6, 1909	22 years, 85 days	Sharkey A.C., New York City, New York, U.S.	
71	Win	42–2 (27)	Joe Sieger	NWS	6	Dec 29, 1908	22 years, 77 days	Dry Dock A.C., New York, U.S.	
70	Win	42–2 (26)	Young Erne	NWS	6	Oct 26, 1908	22 years, 13 days	Roman A.C., New York City, New York, U.S.	
69	Loss	42–2 (25)	Kid Locke	NWS	6	Oct 5, 1908	21 years, 358 days	Roman A.C., New York City, New York, U.S.	
68	Win	42–2 (24)	Fred Corbett	NWS	6	Sep 25, 1908	21 years, 348 days	State A.C., Philadelphia, Pennsylvania, U.S.	
67	Win	42–2 (23)	Joe Bedell	KO	2 (10)	Sep 10, 1908	21 years, 333 days	Roman A.C., New York City, New York, U.S.	
66	Win	41–2 (23)	Charles Williams	KO	1 (20)	Aug 21, 1908	21 years, 313 days	Jeffries' Arena, Vernon, California, U.S.	
65	Win	40–2 (23)	Johnny Dohan	NWS	6	Jun 19, 1908	21 years, 250 days	Roman A.C., New York City, New York, U.S.	
64	Draw	40–2 (22)	Adam Ryan	NWS	6	May 11, 1908	21 years, 211 days	West End A.C., Philadelphia, Pennsylvania, U.S.	
63	Win	40–2 (21)	Harry Scroggs	NWS	6	Apr 23, 1908	21 years, 193 days	Troy, New York, U.S.	
62	Win	40–2 (20)	Young Slasher	KO	1 (10)	Feb 1, 1908	21 years, 111 days	Troy, New York, U.S.	
61	Draw	39–2 (20)	Kid Shea	NWS	6	Jan 8, 1908	21 years, 87 days	Sharkey A.C., New York City, New York, U.S.	
60	Win	39–2 (19)	Felix Leroy	NWS	6	Dec 27, 1907	21 years, 75 days	New Polo A.C., New York City, New York, U.S.	
59	Draw	39–2 (18)	Johnny Marto	NWS	6	Nov 13, 1907	21 years, 31 days	Sharkey A.C., New York City, New York, U.S.	
58	Win	39–2 (17)	Johnny Allen	KO	6 (6)	Sep 26, 1907	20 years, 348 days	Spring Garden A.C., Philadelphia, Pennsylvania, U.S.	
57	Loss	38–2 (17)	Young Loughrey	NWS	6	Jun 24, 1907	20 years, 254 days	Spring Garden A.C., Philadelphia, Pennsylvania, U.S.	
56	Loss	38–2 (16)	Young Loughrey	NWS	6	Jun 10, 1907	20 years, 240 days	Spring Garden A.C., Philadelphia, Pennsylvania, U.S.	
55	Win	38–2 (15)	Willie Moody	NWS	6	May 29, 1907	20 years, 228 days	Spring Garden A.C., Philadelphia, Pennsylvania, U.S.	
54	Draw	38–2 (14)	Tommy Lowe	NWS	6	May 11, 1907	20 years, 210 days	National A.C., Philadelphia, Pennsylvania, U.S.	
53	Win	38–2 (13)	Willie Moody	NWS	6	May 6, 1907	20 years, 205 days	Spring Garden A.C., Philadelphia, Pennsylvania, U.S.	
52	Draw	37–2 (13)	Young Nitchie	NWS	6	Mar 23, 1907	20 years, 141 days	National A.C., Philadelphia, Pennsylvania, U.S.	
51	Win	37–2 (12)	Young Nitchie	NWS	6	Mar 2, 1907	20 years, 140 days	National A.C., Philadelphia, Pennsylvania, U.S.	
50	Win	37–2 (11)	Young Loughrey	TKO	1 (6)	Feb 16, 1907	20 years, 126 days	National A.C., Philadelphia, Pennsylvania, U.S.	
49	Win	36–2 (11)	George Jordon	KO	1 (10)	Feb 15, 1907	20 years, 125 days	New York City, New York, U.S.	
48	Draw	35–2 (11)	Terry Young	NWS	3	Feb 1, 1907	20 years, 111 days	New Polo A.C., New York City, New York, U.S.	
47	Win	35–2 (10)	George Ashley	KO	3 (10)	Dec 13, 1906	20 years, 61 days	New York City, New York, U.S.	
46	Win	34–2 (10)	Jack Sinnott	KO	2 (3)	Dec 7, 1906	20 years, 55 days	Long Acre A.C., New York City, New York, U.S.	
45	Win	33–2 (10)	Al King	KO	1 (10)	Nov 29, 1906	20 years, 47 days	LNew York City, New York, U.S.	
44	Win	32–2 (10)	Young Evans	KO	6 (10)	Oct 25, 1906	20 years, 12 days	Long Acre A.C., New York City, New York, U.S.	
43	Win	31–2 (10)	Eddie Wallace	KO	3 (10)	Oct 11, 1906	19 years, 363 days	New York City, New York, U.S.	
42	Win	30–2 (10)	Jack Nelson	KO	3 (10)	Sep 13, 1906	19 years, 335 days	New York City, New York, U.S.	
41	Win	29–2 (10)	Jack Nelson	NWS	3	May 12, 1906	19 years, 211 days	Madison Square Garden, New York City, New York, U.S.	
40	Win	29–2 (9)	Young Evans	KO	3 (4)	May 3, 1906	19 years, 202 days	Madison Square Garden, New York City, New York, U.S.	
39	Loss	28–2 (9)	Johnny Allen	NWS	6	Apr 2, 1906	19 years, 171 days	Washington S.C., Philadelphia, Pennsylvania, U.S.	
38	Loss	28–2 (8)	Johnny Allen	KO	1 (6)	Mar 26, 1906	19 years, 164 days	Washington S.C., Philadelphia, Pennsylvania, U.S.	
37	Win	28–1 (8)	Eddie Johnson	NWS	3	Mar 19, 1906	19 years, 157 days	Marlborough A.C., New York City, New York, U.S.	
36	Win	28–1 (7)	Mike Moran	NWS	3	Mar 14, 1906	19 years, 152 days	Central A.C., New York City, New York, U.S.	
35	Win	28–1 (6)	Tommy Mowatt	KO	2 (6)	Feb 8, 1906	19 years, 118 days	Long Acre A.C., New York City, New York, U.S.	
34	Win	27–1 (6)	Jack Nelson	KO	1 (?)	Feb 6, 1906	19 years, 116 days	Long Acre A.C., New York City, New York, U.S.	
33	Win	26–1 (6)	Kid Ray	KO	1 (3)	Jan 24, 1906	19 years, 103 days	Central A.C., New York City, New York, U.S.	
32	Win	25–1 (6)	Eddie Johnson	PTS	4	Jan 20, 1906	19 years, 99 days	New York City, New York, U.S.	
31	Win	24–1 (6)	Jack Nelson	NWS	3	Jan 18, 1906	19 years, 97 days	New York City, New York, U.S.	
30	Win	24–1 (5)	Ralph Linder	NWS	3	Dec 22, 1905	19 years, 70 days	New Polo A.C., New York City, New York, U.S.	
29	Draw	24–1 (4)	Dave Oliver	NWS	3	Dec 20, 1905	19 years, 68 days	Richmond County A.C., New York City, New York, U.S.	
28	Win	24–1 (3)	Kid Wilson	NWS	3	Dec 11, 1905	19 years, 59 days	Navarre A.C., New York City, New York, U.S.	
27	Win	24–1 (2)	John Condon	KO	1 (3)	Dec 11, 1905	19 years, 59 days	Navarre A.C., New York City, New York, U.S.	
26	Win	23–1 (2)	Tom Brady	KO	2 (3)	Dec 7, 1905	19 years, 55 days	Long Acre A.C., New York City, New York, U.S.	
25	Win	22–1 (2)	Mike Tuths	PTS	4	Oct 27, 1905	19 years, 14 days	New York City, New York, U.S.	
24	Win	21–1 (2)	Mike Oscar	KO	1 (6)	Sep 9, 1905	18 years, 331 days	New York City, New York, U.S.	
23	Win	20–1 (2)	Jack Willis	KO	1 (6)	Sep 2, 1905	18 years, 324 days	New York City, New York, U.S.	
22	Win	19–1 (2)	Jack Bolter	KO	1 (6)	May 25, 1905	18 years, 224 days	New York City, New York, U.S.	
21	Win	18–1 (2)	Jack Mullins	KO	1 (6)	May 16, 1905	18 years, 215 days	New York City, New York, U.S.	
20	NC	17–1 (2)	Lew Ryall	NC	5 (6)	May 10, 1905	18 years, 209 days	National A.C., Philadelphia, Pennsylvania, U.S.	
19	Win	17–1 (1)	Smiling Joe Kelly	KO	1 (6)	May 9, 1905	18 years, 208 days	New York City, New York, U.S.	
18	Win	16–1 (1)	Eddie Ross	KO	1 (6)	May 4, 1905	18 years, 203 days	New York City, New York, U.S.	
17	Win	15–1 (1)	Sailor Condon	KO	1 (6)	May 2, 1905	18 years, 201 days	New York City, New York, U.S.	
16	Win	14–1 (1)	Mike Moore	KO	1 (6)	Apr 28, 1905	18 years, 197 days	New York City, New York, U.S.	
15	Win	13–1 (1)	Bant Dorsey	KO	1 (6)	Apr 14, 1905	18 years, 183 days	New York City, New York, U.S.	
14	Win	12–1 (1)	John Black	KO	1 (6)	Apr 5, 1905	18 years, 174 days	New York City, New York, U.S.	
13	Win	11–1 (1)	Jack Doyle	KO	1 (6)	Mar 28, 1905	18 years, 166 days	New York City, New York, U.S.	
12	Win	10–1 (1)	Eddie McAvoy	NWS	6	Mar 18, 1905	18 years, 156 days	National A.C., Philadelphia, Pennsylvania, U.S.	
11	Win	10–1	Mike Moran	PTS	3 (4)	May 6, 1904	17 years, 206 days	New York City, New York, U.S.	
10	Win	9–1	Barney Wilson	PTS	3 (4)	Apr 8, 1904	17 years, 178 days	New York City, New York, U.S.	
9	Win	8–1	Bobby Flynn	PTS	6	Apr 2, 1904	17 years, 172 days	New York City, New York, U.S.	
8	Win	7–1	Kid Allen	KO	1 (6)	Mar 18, 1904	17 years, 157 days	New York City, New York, U.S.	
7	Win	6–1	Frank Miller	KO	3 (6)	Mar 7, 1904	17 years, 146 days	New York City, New York, U.S.	
6	Win	5–1	Harry Delany	KO	1 (6)	Feb 19, 1904	17 years, 129 days	New York City, New York, U.S.	
5	Win	4–1	Sailor Dolan	KO	1 (6)	Feb 12, 1904	17 years, 122 days	New York City, New York, U.S.	
4	Win	3–1	Young Oates	KO	3 (6)	Feb 8, 1904	17 years, 118 days	New York City, New York, U.S.	
3	Win	2–1	Willie Riley	PTS	6	Jan 9, 1904	17 years, 88 days	New York City, New York, U.S.	
2	Win	1–1	Tip Flinnery	PTS	6	Jan 2, 1904	17 years, 81 days	New York City, New York, U.S.	
1	Loss	0–1	Bobby Flynn	KO	5 (?)	Nov 12, 1903	17 years, 30 days	New York City, New York, U.S.	

=== Unofficial record ===
164 fights	115 wins	32 losses
By knockout	60	6
By decision	55	26
Draws	15	
No contests	2	

Record with the inclusion of newspaper decisions to the win/loss/draw column.

No.	Result	Record	Opponent	Type	Round	Date	Age	Location	Notes
164	Loss	115–32–15 (2)	Jimmy Gardy	PTS	10	Feb 1, 1923	36 years, 111 days	102nd Medical Regiment Armory, New York City, New York, U.S.	
163	Loss	115–31–15 (2)	Billy Calpin	TKO	3 (10)	Dec 21, 1922	36 years, 69 days	Town Hall, Scranton, Pennsylvania, U.S.	
162	Win	115–30–15 (2)	Willie Roller	KO	2 (10)	Dec 4, 1922	36 years, 52 days	New York City, New York, U.S.	
161	Loss	114–30–15 (2)	Rube Cohen	PTS	10	Nov 8, 1922	36 years, 26 days	Armory, Schenectady, New York, U.S.	
160	Win	114–29–15 (2)	Barry Norton	KO	3 (10)	Sep 20, 1922	35 years, 342 days	Mitchel Field Arena, Mineola, New York, U.S.	
159	Win	113–29–15 (2)	Joey Werner	PTS	12	Aug 4, 1922	35 years, 295 days	15th Regiment Armory, New York City, New York, U.S.	
158	Loss	112–29–15 (2)	Louis Tasiero	PTS	6	Jul 29, 1922	35 years, 289 days	Queensboro Stadium, New York City, New York, U.S.	
157	Win	112–28–15 (2)	Joe Weber	PTS	8	May 20, 1922	35 years, 219 days	Queensboro Stadium, New York City, New York, U.S.	
156	Win	111–28–15 (2)	Joe Connors	KO	2 (10)	May 4, 1922	35 years, 203 days	United States of America	
155	Draw	110–28–15 (2)	Joe Fox	PTS	12	Apr 28, 1922	35 years, 197 days	15th Regiment Armory, New York City, New York, U.S.	
154	Win	110–28–14 (2)	Eddie Hogan	KO	4 (10)	Apr 14, 1922	35 years, 183 days	New York City, New York, U.S.	
153	Win	109–28–14 (2)	Johnny Fagan	KO	2 (10)	Apr 8, 1922	35 years, 177 days	47th Regiment Armory, New York City, New York, U.S.	
152	Win	108–28–14 (2)	Ned Cowler	KO	4 (10)	Mar 24, 1922	35 years, 162 days	15th Regiment Armory, New York City, New York, U.S.	
151	Win	107–28–14 (2)	Jack Miller	KO	1 (10)	Mar 17, 1922	35 years, 155 days	15th Regiment Armory, New York City, New York, U.S.	
150	Win	106–28–14 (2)	Frank Baker	KO	1 (10)	Jan 30, 1919	32 years, 109 days	United States of America	
149	Win	105–28–14 (2)	Willie Scott	KO	1 (10)	Jan 24, 1919	32 years, 103 days	Passaic, New Jersey, U.S.	
148	Win	104–28–14 (2)	Mike Sheehy	KO	1 (10)	Nov 24, 1917	31 years, 42 days	New York City, New York, U.S.	
147	Win	103–28–14 (2)	Denny Coakley	KO	1 (10)	Nov 12, 1917	31 years, 30 days	New York City, New York, U.S.	
146	Win	102–28–14 (2)	Jack Sheldon	NWS	10	Nov 5, 1917	31 years, 23 days	New York City, New York, U.S.	
145	Win	101–28–14 (2)	Young Billy Papke	NWS	10	Oct 29, 1917	31 years, 16 days	Yorkville A.C., New York City, New York, U.S.	
144	Loss	100–28–14 (2)	Johnny Martin	PTS	10	Jun 4, 1917	30 years, 234 days	Casino Hall, Bridgeport, Connecticut, U.S.	
143	Loss	100–27–14 (2)	Young Joe Rivers	NWS	12	May 28, 1917	30 years, 227 days	Whip City A.C., Westfield, Massachusetts, U.S.	
142	Win	100–26–14 (2)	Jimmy Flynn	NWS	10	May 21, 1917	30 years, 220 days	Yorkville A.C., New York City, New York, U.S.	
141	Win	99–26–14 (2)	Eddie Wald	KO	1 (10)	May 4, 1917	30 years, 203 days	United States of America	
140	Win	98–26–14 (2)	Jimmy Flynn	NWS	10	Apr 30, 1917	30 years, 199 days	New York City, New York, U.S.	
139	Win	97–26–14 (2)	Oakland Frankie Burns	NWS	10	Feb 26, 1917	30 years, 136 days	Yorkville A.C., New York City, New York, U.S.	
138	Win	96–26–14 (2)	Danny Cronin	KO	1 (10)	Jan 20, 1917	30 years, 99 days	United States of America	
137	Win	95–26–14 (2)	Dummy Burns	NWS	10	Jan 8, 1917	30 years, 87 days	Yorkville A.C., New York City, New York, U.S.	
136	ND	94–26–14 (2)	Harry Champ Segal	ND	10	Oct 17, 1916	30 years, 4 days	Hunts Point A.C., New York City, New York, U.S.	
135	Loss	94–26–14 (1)	Harry Pierce	KO	8 (10)	Jul 25, 1916	29 years, 286 days	Harlem-Rockaway S.C., New York City, New York, U.S.	
134	Win	94–25–14 (1)	Allie Nack	NWS	10	Jul 1, 1916	29 years, 262 days	Fairmont A.C., New York City, New York, U.S.	
133	Loss	93–25–14 (1)	Westside Jimmy Duffy	NWS	10	May 22, 1916	29 years, 222 days	Olympic A.C., New York City, New York, U.S.	
132	Draw	93–24–14 (1)	Young Blades	PTS	10	Jan 25, 1916	29 years, 104 days	Pawtucket, Rhode Island, U.S.	
131	Loss	93–24–13 (1)	Chick Simler	NWS	10	Jan 22, 1916	29 years, 101 days	Queensboro A.C., New York City, New York, U.S.	
130	Win	93–23–13 (1)	Andy Wright	KO	1 (10)	Jan 14, 1916	29 years, 93 days	New York City, New York, U.S.	
129	Win	92–23–13 (1)	Eddie Carroll	KO	1 (10)	Oct 30, 1915	29 years, 17 days	United States of America	
128	Win	91–23–13 (1)	Battling Murphy	KO	3 (10)	Oct 18, 1915	29 years, 5 days	United States of America	
127	Win	90–23–13 (1)	Chick Simler	NWS	10	Oct 2, 1915	28 years, 354 days	Queensboro A.C., New York City, New York, U.S.	
126	Draw	89–23–13 (1)	Willie Schaefer	NWS	10	May 22, 1915	28 years, 221 days	New York City, New York, U.S.	
125	Draw	89–23–12 (1)	Hal Stewart	NWS	10	Apr 14, 1915	28 years, 183 days	Auditorium, Lima, Ohio, U.S.	
124	Draw	89–23–11 (1)	Battling Murphy	PTS	10	Mar 29, 1915	28 years, 167 days	United States of America	
123	Win	89–23–10 (1)	Battling Terry	PTS	10	Mar 10, 1915	28 years, 148 days	Akron, Ohio, U.S.	
122	Win	88–23–10 (1)	Dick Peters	NWS	10	Dec 5, 1914	28 years, 53 days	Queensboro A.C., New York City, New York, U.S.	
121	Win	87–23–10 (1)	Young Dyson	NWS	10	Oct 20, 1914	28 years, 7 days	Brown's Gym A.A., New York City, New York, U.S.	
120	Win	86–23–10 (1)	Joe Hyland	NWS	?	Aug 4, 1914	27 years, 295 days	Atlantic A.A., New York City, New York, U.S.	
119	Win	85–23–10 (1)	Joe Bailey	KO	1 (10)	May 6, 1914	27 years, 205 days	Coney Island, New York City, New York, U.S.	
118	Win	84–23–10 (1)	Johnny Schumacher	NWS	10	Apr 21, 1914	27 years, 190 days	New York City, New York, U.S.	
117	Loss	83–23–10 (1)	Cy Smith	NWS	10	Mar 24, 1914	27 years, 162 days	Brown's Gym A.A., New York City, New York, U.S.	
116	Win	83–22–10 (1)	Dodo Maher	NWS	10	Mar 16, 1914	27 years, 154 days	Armory, Norwalk, Virginia, U.S.	
115	Loss	82–22–10 (1)	Mike Mazie	NWS	10	Feb 12, 1914	27 years, 122 days	Madison Square Garden, New York City, New York, U.S.	
114	Win	82–21–10 (1)	Young Keats	KO	1 (10)	Jan 20, 1914	27 years, 99 days	Brown's Gym A.A., New York City, New York, U.S.	
113	Win	81–21–10 (1)	Andy Cortez	KO	5 (10)	Dec 17, 1913	27 years, 65 days	Windsor Locks, Connecticut, U.S.	
112	Draw	80–21–10 (1)	Johnny Lore	NWS	6	Nov 27, 1913	27 years, 45 days	Queensboro A.C., New York City, New York, U.S.	
111	Win	80–21–9 (1)	Eddie Conway	NWS	6	Nov 8, 1913	27 years, 26 days	Queensboro A.C., New York City, New York, U.S.	
110	Loss	79–21–9 (1)	Charley Turner	NWS	6	Nov 7, 1913	27 years, 25 days	Nonpareil A.C., Philadelphia, Pennsylvania, U.S.	
109	Win	79–20–9 (1)	Charley Hansen	NWS	10	Nov 1, 1913	27 years, 19 days	Fairmont A.C., New York City, New York, U.S.	
108	Win	78–20–9 (1)	Charley "Twin" Miller	NWS	10	Oct 16, 1913	27 years, 3 days	City A.C., New York City, New York, U.S.	
107	Loss	77–20–9 (1)	Harry Carter	NWS	10	Oct 11, 1913	26 years, 363 days	Queensboro A.C., New York City, New York, U.S.	
106	Win	77–19–9 (1)	Young Terry	NWS	6	Sep 6, 1913	26 years, 328 days	Brown's Gym A.A., New York City, New York, U.S.	
105	Win	76–19–9 (1)	Artie Fink	PTS	4	Jun 2, 1913	26 years, 232 days	United States of America	
104	Win	75–19–9 (1)	Paddy Sullivan	NWS	10	Apr 14, 1913	26 years, 183 days	Olympia Boxing Club, New York City, New York, U.S.	
103	Win	74–19–9 (1)	Lew McDermott	NWS	3	Jan 9, 1913	26 years, 88 days	St. Bartholomew A.C., New York City, New York, U.S.	
102	Win	73–19–9 (1)	Willie Schaefer	NWS	10	Dec 14, 1912	26 years, 62 days	Fairmont A.C., New York City, New York, U.S.	
101	Loss	72–19–9 (1)	Benny Franklin	NWS	10	May 7, 1912	25 years, 207 days	Brown's Gym A.A., New York City, New York, U.S.	
100	Win	72–18–9 (1)	Al McCoy	NWS	10	Mar 29, 1912	25 years, 168 days	Queensboro A.C., New York City, New York, U.S.	
99	Loss	71–18–9 (1)	Jack Goodman	NWS	10	Jan 22, 1912	25 years, 101 days	Olympia Boxing Club, New York City, New York, U.S.	
98	Loss	71–17–9 (1)	Billy Sherman	KO	2 (10)	Nov 2, 1911	25 years, 20 days	New York City, New York, U.S.	
97	Loss	71–16–9 (1)	Paul Köhler	PTS	10	Oct 30, 1911	25 years, 17 days	Cleveland, Ohio, U.S.	
96	Win	71–15–9 (1)	Benny Franklin	NWS	6	Sep 29, 1911	24 years, 351 days	New York City, New York, U.S.	
95	Draw	70–15–9 (1)	Kid Burns	NWS	10	Sep 18, 1911	24 years, 340 days	Fordham A.C., New York City, New York, U.S.	
94	Loss	70–15–8 (1)	Joe Hirst	NWS	6	Mar 29, 1911	24 years, 167 days	Armory, Rochester, New York, U.S.	
93	Loss	70–14–8 (1)	Unk Russell	PTS	10	Mar 14, 1911	24 years, 152 days	Grand Avenue A.C., Kansas City, Missouri, U.S.	
92	Win	70–13–8 (1)	Jack Savage	TKO	3 (8)	Feb 8, 1911	24 years, 118 days	National A.C., Memphis, Tennessee, U.S.	
91	Win	69–13–8 (1)	Eddie Webber	TKO	3 (10)	Feb 1, 1911	24 years, 111 days	National A.C., Memphis, Tennessee, U.S.	
90	Win	68–13–8 (1)	Jack Savage	KO	1 (10)	Jan 20, 1911	24 years, 99 days	New York City, New York, U.S.	
89	Loss	67–13–8 (1)	Lew Powell	NWS	10	Dec 6, 1910	24 years, 54 days	National S.C., New York City, New York, U.S.	
88	Win	67–12–8 (1)	Joe Sieger	NWS	10	Dec 1, 1910	24 years, 49 days	Long Acre A.C., New York City, New York, U.S.	
87	Loss	66–12–8 (1)	Lew Powell	NWS	10	Nov 21, 1910	24 years, 39 days	Olympia Boxing Club, New York City, New York, U.S.	
86	Loss	66–11–8 (1)	Leo Houck	NWS	6	Oct 1, 1910	23 years, 353 days	National A.C., Philadelphia, Pennsylvania, U.S.	
85	Win	66–10–8 (1)	Dick Nelson	NWS	10	May 9, 1910	23 years, 208 days	Harlem River Casino, New York City, New York, U.S.	
84	Draw	65–10–8 (1)	Sammy Smith	NWS	10	Apr 23, 1910	23 years, 192 days	Harlem River Casino, New York City, New York, U.S.	
83	Win	65–10–7 (1)	Paddy Sullivan	KO	1 (10)	Apr 13, 1910	23 years, 182 days	Sharkey A.C., New York City, New York, U.S.	
82	Win	64–10–7 (1)	Bobby Wilson	NWS	10	Mar 8, 1910	23 years, 146 days	American A.C., Schenectady, New York, U.S.	
81	Win	63–10–7 (1)	George Pardner	NWS	3	Mar 4, 1910	23 years, 142 days	St. Bartholomew A.C., New York City, New York, U.S.	
80	Win	62–10–7 (1)	Joe Stein	NWS	10	Jan 10, 1910	23 years, 89 days	Olympic A.C., New York City, New York, U.S.	
79	Loss	61–10–7 (1)	Eddie McAvoy	NWS	6	Oct 14, 1909	23 years, 1 day	Broadway A.C., Philadelphia, Pennsylvania, U.S.	
78	Loss	61–9–7 (1)	Johnny Marto	NWS	10	Sep 10, 1909	22 years, 332 days	Fairmont A.C., New York City, New York, U.S.	
77	Win	61–8–7 (1)	Paddy Lavin	NWS	6	May 29, 1909	22 years, 228 days	National A.C., Philadelphia, Pennsylvania, U.S.	
76	Loss	60–8–7 (1)	Young Joseph	PTS	20	Apr 26, 1909	22 years, 195 days	Wonderland, Whitechapel Road, Mile End, London, England, U.K.	For vacant world welterweight title claim
75	Win	60–7–7 (1)	Sid Stagg	KO	5 (10)	Mar 26, 1909	22 years, 164 days	Cosmopolitan Gymnasium, Plymouth, Devon, England, U.K.	
74	Win	59–7–7 (1)	George Proctor	KO	3 (10)	Mar 20, 1909	22 years, 158 days	Wonderland, Paris, France	
73	Loss	58–7–7 (1)	Leach Cross	KO	5 (10)	Jan 21, 1909	22 years, 100 days	Fairmont A.C., New York City, New York, U.S.	
72	Win	58–6–7 (1)	Paddy Sullivan	NWS	10	Jan 6, 1909	22 years, 85 days	Sharkey A.C., New York City, New York, U.S.	
71	Win	57–6–7 (1)	Joe Sieger	NWS	6	Dec 29, 1908	22 years, 77 days	Dry Dock A.C., New York, U.S.	
70	Win	56–6–7 (1)	Young Erne	NWS	6	Oct 26, 1908	22 years, 13 days	Roman A.C., New York City, New York, U.S.	
69	Loss	55–6–7 (1)	Kid Locke	NWS	6	Oct 5, 1908	21 years, 358 days	Roman A.C., New York City, New York, U.S.	
68	Win	55–5–7 (1)	Fred Corbett	NWS	6	Sep 25, 1908	21 years, 348 days	State A.C., Philadelphia, Pennsylvania, U.S.	
67	Win	54–5–7 (1)	Joe Bedell	KO	2 (10)	Sep 10, 1908	21 years, 333 days	Roman A.C., New York City, New York, U.S.	
66	Win	53–5–7 (1)	Charles Williams	KO	1 (20)	Aug 21, 1908	21 years, 313 days	Jeffries' Arena, Vernon, California, U.S.	
65	Win	52–5–7 (1)	Johnny Dohan	NWS	6	Jun 19, 1908	21 years, 250 days	Roman A.C., New York City, New York, U.S.	
64	Draw	51–5–7 (1)	Adam Ryan	NWS	6	May 11, 1908	21 years, 211 days	West End A.C., Philadelphia, Pennsylvania, U.S.	
63	Win	51–5–6 (1)	Harry Scroggs	NWS	6	Apr 23, 1908	21 years, 193 days	Troy, New York, U.S.	
62	Win	50–5–6 (1)	Young Slasher	KO	1 (10)	Feb 1, 1908	21 years, 111 days	Troy, New York, U.S.	
61	Draw	49–5–6 (1)	Kid Shea	NWS	6	Jan 8, 1908	21 years, 87 days	Sharkey A.C., New York City, New York, U.S.	
60	Win	49–5–5 (1)	Felix Leroy	NWS	6	Dec 27, 1907	21 years, 75 days	New Polo A.C., New York City, New York, U.S.	
59	Draw	48–5–5 (1)	Johnny Marto	NWS	6	Nov 13, 1907	21 years, 31 days	Sharkey A.C., New York City, New York, U.S.	
58	Win	48–5–4 (1)	Johnny Allen	KO	6 (6)	Sep 26, 1907	20 years, 348 days	Spring Garden A.C., Philadelphia, Pennsylvania, U.S.	
57	Loss	47–5–4 (1)	Young Loughrey	NWS	6	Jun 24, 1907	20 years, 254 days	Spring Garden A.C., Philadelphia, Pennsylvania, U.S.	
56	Loss	47–4–4 (1)	Young Loughrey	NWS	6	Jun 10, 1907	20 years, 240 days	Spring Garden A.C., Philadelphia, Pennsylvania, U.S.	
55	Win	47–3–4 (1)	Willie Moody	NWS	6	May 29, 1907	20 years, 228 days	Spring Garden A.C., Philadelphia, Pennsylvania, U.S.	
54	Draw	46–3–4 (1)	Tommy Lowe	NWS	6	May 11, 1907	20 years, 210 days	National A.C., Philadelphia, Pennsylvania, U.S.	
53	Win	46–3–3 (1)	Willie Moody	NWS	6	May 6, 1907	20 years, 205 days	Spring Garden A.C., Philadelphia, Pennsylvania, U.S.	
52	Draw	45–3–3 (1)	Young Nitchie	NWS	6	Mar 23, 1907	20 years, 141 days	National A.C., Philadelphia, Pennsylvania, U.S.	
51	Win	45–3–2 (1)	Young Nitchie	NWS	6	Mar 2, 1907	20 years, 140 days	National A.C., Philadelphia, Pennsylvania, U.S.	
50	Win	44–3–2 (1)	Young Loughrey	TKO	1 (6)	Feb 16, 1907	20 years, 126 days	National A.C., Philadelphia, Pennsylvania, U.S.	
49	Win	43–3–2 (1)	George Jordon	KO	1 (10)	Feb 15, 1907	20 years, 125 days	New York City, New York, U.S.	
48	Draw	42–3–2 (1)	Terry Young	NWS	3	Feb 1, 1907	20 years, 111 days	New Polo A.C., New York City, New York, U.S.	
47	Win	42–3–1 (1)	George Ashley	KO	3 (10)	Dec 13, 1906	20 years, 61 days	New York City, New York, U.S.	
46	Win	41–3–1 (1)	Jack Sinnott	KO	2 (3)	Dec 7, 1906	20 years, 55 days	Long Acre A.C., New York City, New York, U.S.	
45	Win	40–3–1 (1)	Al King	KO	1 (10)	Nov 29, 1906	20 years, 47 days	LNew York City, New York, U.S.	
44	Win	39–3–1 (1)	Young Evans	KO	6 (10)	Oct 25, 1906	20 years, 12 days	Long Acre A.C., New York City, New York, U.S.	
43	Win	38–3–1 (1)	Eddie Wallace	KO	3 (10)	Oct 11, 1906	19 years, 363 days	New York City, New York, U.S.	
42	Win	37–3–1 (1)	Jack Nelson	KO	3 (10)	Sep 13, 1906	19 years, 335 days	New York City, New York, U.S.	
41	Win	36–3–1 (1)	Jack Nelson	NWS	3	May 12, 1906	19 years, 211 days	Madison Square Garden, New York City, New York, U.S.	
40	Win	35–3–1 (1)	Young Evans	KO	3 (4)	May 3, 1906	19 years, 202 days	Madison Square Garden, New York City, New York, U.S.	
39	Loss	34–3–1 (1)	Johnny Allen	NWS	6	Apr 2, 1906	19 years, 171 days	Washington S.C., Philadelphia, Pennsylvania, U.S.	
38	Loss	34–2–1 (1)	Johnny Allen	KO	1 (6)	Mar 26, 1906	19 years, 164 days	Washington S.C., Philadelphia, Pennsylvania, U.S.	
37	Win	34–1–1 (1)	Eddie Johnson	NWS	3	Mar 19, 1906	19 years, 157 days	Marlborough A.C., New York City, New York, U.S.	
36	Win	33–1–1 (1)	Mike Moran	NWS	3	Mar 14, 1906	19 years, 152 days	Central A.C., New York City, New York, U.S.	
35	Win	32–1–1 (1)	Tommy Mowatt	KO	2 (6)	Feb 8, 1906	19 years, 118 days	Long Acre A.C., New York City, New York, U.S.	
34	Win	31–1–1 (1)	Jack Nelson	KO	1 (?)	Feb 6, 1906	19 years, 116 days	Long Acre A.C., New York City, New York, U.S.	
33	Win	30–1–1 (1)	Kid Ray	KO	1 (3)	Jan 24, 1906	19 years, 103 days	Central A.C., New York City, New York, U.S.	
32	Win	29–1–1 (1)	Eddie Johnson	PTS	4	Jan 20, 1906	19 years, 99 days	New York City, New York, U.S.	
31	Win	28–1–1 (1)	Jack Nelson	NWS	3	Jan 18, 1906	19 years, 97 days	New York City, New York, U.S.	
30	Win	27–1–1 (1)	Ralph Linder	NWS	3	Dec 22, 1905	19 years, 70 days	New Polo A.C., New York City, New York, U.S.	
29	Draw	26–1–1 (1)	Dave Oliver	NWS	3	Dec 20, 1905	19 years, 68 days	Richmond County A.C., New York City, New York, U.S.	
28	Win	26–1 (1)	Kid Wilson	NWS	3	Dec 11, 1905	19 years, 59 days	Navarre A.C., New York City, New York, U.S.	
27	Win	25–1 (1)	John Condon	KO	1 (3)	Dec 11, 1905	19 years, 59 days	Navarre A.C., New York City, New York, U.S.	
26	Win	24–1 (1)	Tom Brady	KO	2 (3)	Dec 7, 1905	19 years, 55 days	Long Acre A.C., New York City, New York, U.S.	
25	Win	23–1 (1)	Mike Tuths	PTS	4	Oct 27, 1905	19 years, 14 days	New York City, New York, U.S.	
24	Win	22–1 (1)	Mike Oscar	KO	1 (6)	Sep 9, 1905	18 years, 331 days	New York City, New York, U.S.	
23	Win	21–1 (1)	Jack Willis	KO	1 (6)	Sep 2, 1905	18 years, 324 days	New York City, New York, U.S.	
22	Win	20–1 (1)	Jack Bolter	KO	1 (6)	May 25, 1905	18 years, 224 days	New York City, New York, U.S.	
21	Win	19–1 (1)	Jack Mullins	KO	1 (6)	May 16, 1905	18 years, 215 days	New York City, New York, U.S.	
20	NC	18–1 (1)	Lew Ryall	NC	5 (6)	May 10, 1905	18 years, 209 days	National A.C., Philadelphia, Pennsylvania, U.S.	
19	Win	18–1	Smiling Joe Kelly	KO	1 (6)	May 9, 1905	18 years, 208 days	New York City, New York, U.S.	
18	Win	17–1	Eddie Ross	KO	1 (6)	May 4, 1905	18 years, 203 days	New York City, New York, U.S.	
17	Win	16–1	Sailor Condon	KO	1 (6)	May 2, 1905	18 years, 201 days	New York City, New York, U.S.	
16	Win	15–1	Mike Moore	KO	1 (6)	Apr 28, 1905	18 years, 197 days	New York City, New York, U.S.	
15	Win	14–1	Bant Dorsey	KO	1 (6)	Apr 14, 1905	18 years, 183 days	New York City, New York, U.S.	
14	Win	13–1	John Black	KO	1 (6)	Apr 5, 1905	18 years, 174 days	New York City, New York, U.S.	
13	Win	12–1	Jack Doyle	KO	1 (6)	Mar 28, 1905	18 years, 166 days	New York City, New York, U.S.	
12	Win	11–1	Eddie McAvoy	NWS	6	Mar 18, 1905	18 years, 156 days	National A.C., Philadelphia, Pennsylvania, U.S.	
11	Win	10–1	Mike Moran	PTS	3 (4)	May 6, 1904	17 years, 206 days	New York City, New York, U.S.	
10	Win	9–1	Barney Wilson	PTS	3 (4)	Apr 8, 1904	17 years, 178 days	New York City, New York, U.S.	
9	Win	8–1	Bobby Flynn	PTS	6	Apr 2, 1904	17 years, 172 days	New York City, New York, U.S.	
8	Win	7–1	Kid Allen	KO	1 (6)	Mar 18, 1904	17 years, 157 days	New York City, New York, U.S.	
7	Win	6–1	Frank Miller	KO	3 (6)	Mar 7, 1904	17 years, 146 days	New York City, New York, U.S.	
6	Win	5–1	Harry Delany	KO	1 (6)	Feb 19, 1904	17 years, 129 days	New York City, New York, U.S.	
5	Win	4–1	Sailor Dolan	KO	1 (6)	Feb 12, 1904	17 years, 122 days	New York City, New York, U.S.	
4	Win	3–1	Young Oates	KO	3 (6)	Feb 8, 1904	17 years, 118 days	New York City, New York, U.S.	
3	Win	2–1	Willie Riley	PTS	6	Jan 9, 1904	17 years, 88 days	New York City, New York, U.S.	
2	Win	1–1	Tip Flinnery	PTS	6	Jan 2, 1904	17 years, 81 days	New York City, New York, U.S.	
1	Loss	0–1	Bobby Flynn	KO	5 (?)	Nov 12, 1903	17 years, 30 days	New York City, New York, U.S.	

Records
Preceded by Jimmy Barry; 4	Most consecutive first-round knockouts 15; October 13, 1905 - September 25, 2006	Succeeded by Edwin Valero; 18
