= Al McCoy (boxer) =

American boxer (1894–1966)

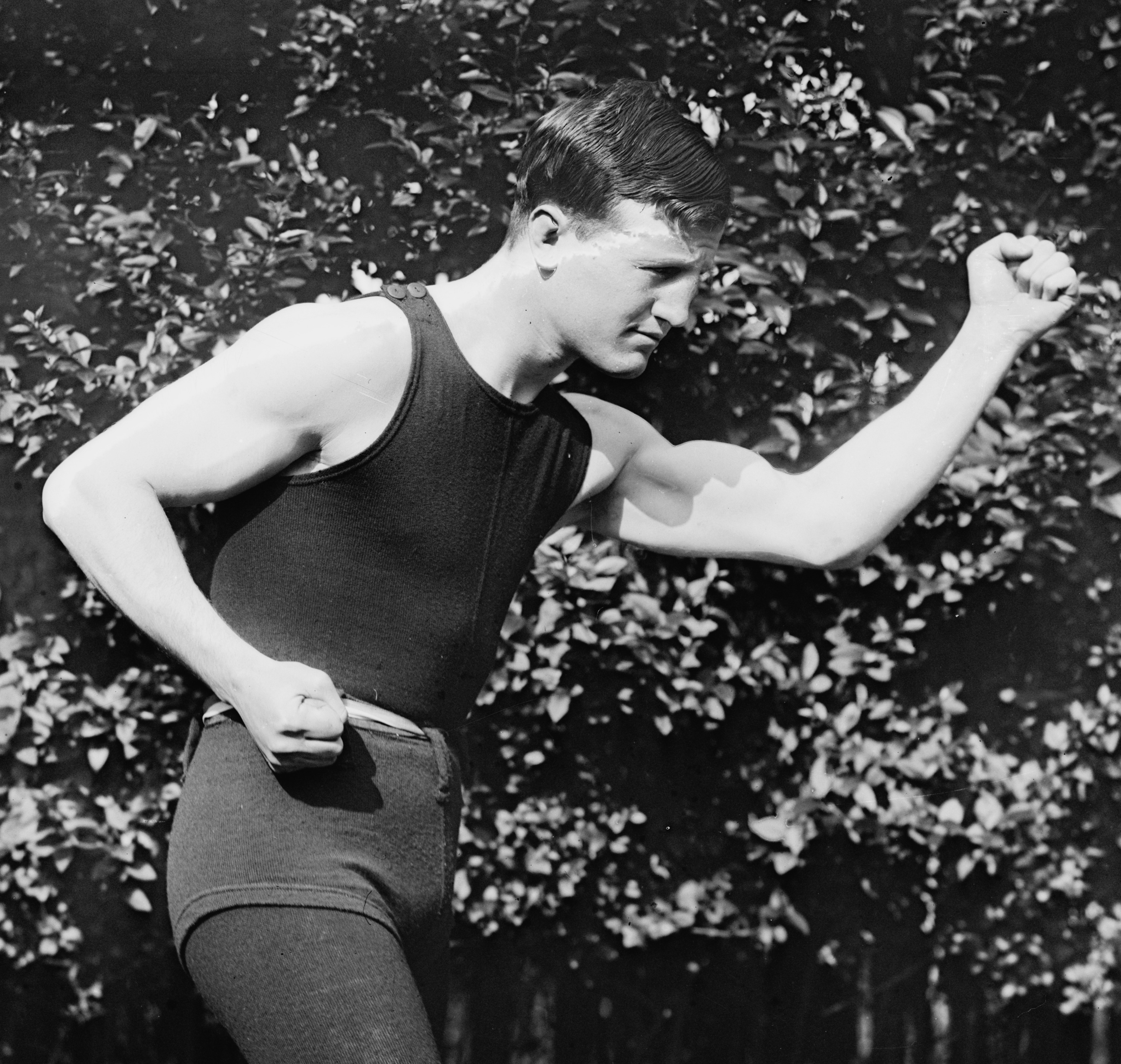

Personal information
- Nickname: Southpaw
- Born: Alexander Rudolph; October 23, 1894 Rosenhayn, New Jersey, U.S.
- Died: August 22, 1966 (aged 71) Los Angeles, California, U.S.
- Height: 5 ft 8 in (1.73 m)
- Weight: Middleweight

Boxing career
- Stance: Southpaw

Boxing record
- Total fights: 159;
- Wins: 73
- Win by KO: 27
- Losses: 51
- Draws: 33

Al McCoy (October 23, 1894 – August 22, 1966), born Alexander Rudolph, was an American boxing World Middleweight Champion from 1914 to 1917. He had a total of 157 bouts. Of those determined officially, he won 44 with 27 by knockout, and had 6 losses, and 6 draws. Around 107 of his fights were no decision bouts.

Referees and judges in this era could not render a decision for fights in New York and most other states except in the case of a disqualification or knockout. McCoy's BoxRec record on the right has newspaper coverage determining the winner for his large number of no decision bouts. Newspapers could also determine the outcome of a fight as a draw.

== Early life and boxing career ==
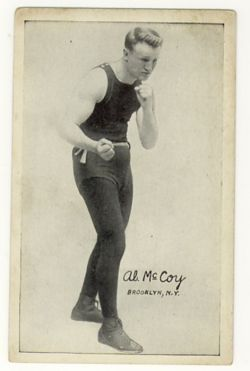
Al McCoy

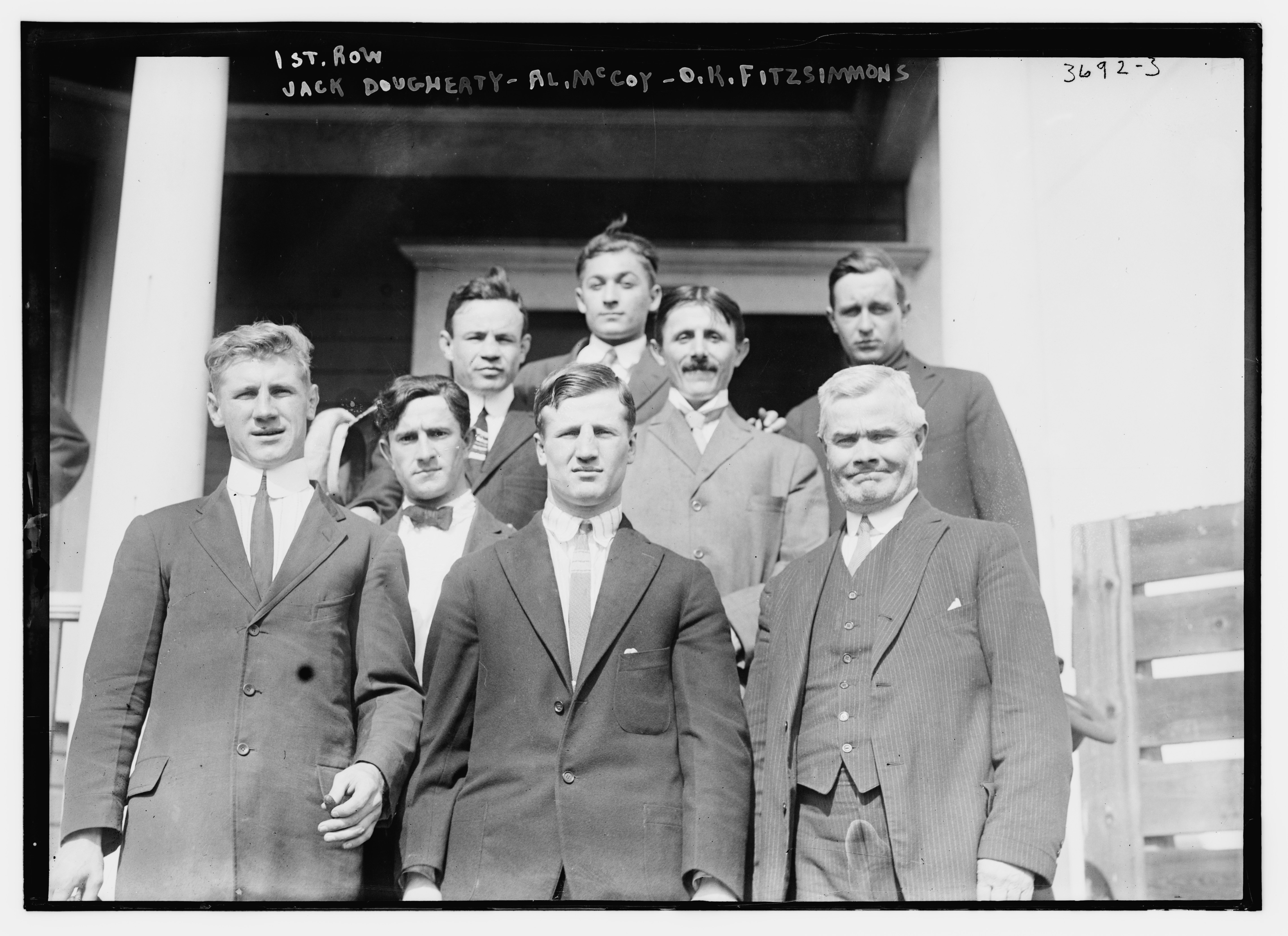
Front Row: McCoy's Boxing Manager, Jack Dougherty, McCoy, and O.K. Fitzsimmons in 1915

McCoy was born Alexander Rudolph in Rosenhayn, Deerfield Township, New Jersey, on October 23, 1894. As a child, he moved with his family to Brownsville, Brooklyn, New York City, where his father found work as a kosher butcher. At age 14 he helped make ends meet by filling in as a boxer for preliminary fights at local boxing clubs, when the scheduled boxers failed to show.

Ken Blady speculates that his manager, Charley Goldman, had him change his surname to McCoy to hide his boxing from his religious parents who would have objected. Blady made the stunning observation that for his first nine years and 139 fights McCoy was undefeated. This made his winning streak second only to English boxer Hal Bagwell, although the fact that a no-decision bout did not officially count as a loss, probably aided McCoy's record.

McCoy started boxing as a bantamweight, but fighting as a 138-pound lightweight in 1912, he began to attract attention. He defeated Young Erne, a competent Philadelphia lightweight, on November 9, 1912, in Philadelphia, winning in six rounds. The newspaper that gave him the edge noted that Erne was too out of condition to match well with the fit sixteen year old.

Fighting as a welterweight, on March 2, 1912, in a ten-round newspaper decision, he defeated the more accomplished boxer Terry McGraw who he outweighed. Fighting on July 3, 1916, in Queens, he defeated Dave Kurtz in a ten-round newspaper decision. Not surprisingly, the seventeen year old's luck took a turn when he fought Young Otto, a more accomplished Jewish lightweight boxer from New York's Lower East Side, nine years his senior, who would hold a record for most consecutive first-round knockouts. McCoy lost to the lighter Otto, though fighting at 155 in the light middleweight range.

In 1913, he battled even more impressive boxers, though winning far more rarely by knockout. In no decision bouts well into the middleweight range, he met Jewish boxer Soldier Bartfield, who would engage in close fights or defeat most of the great boxers of the era. He also matched with Terry Mitchell, Billy Grup, KO Brennan, Bull Anderson and the Zulu Kid. The newspapers had him winning all these standard ten round New York fights, except for a draw with the accomplished welterweight Zulu Kid. He even defeated the exceptional Soldier Bartfield on August 11, 1913, knocking him to the canvas three times in the fight. McCoy would never again decisively beat Bartfield, though he would meet him at least four more times in his career. Though never winning a world title, Bartfield would meet and often defeat more champions and top contenders than nearly any other boxer of his era.

McCoy fought Wildcat Ferns to two draws by decision in Ohio where referees could determine the outcome of a bout without a foul or knockout occurring.

== Winning the Middleweight World Championship ==
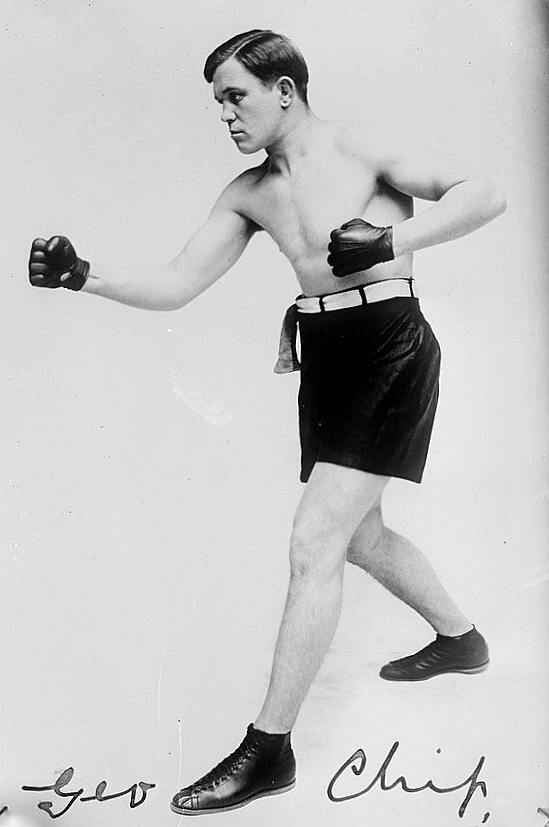
George Chip, Middleweight Champion

McCoy was originally scheduled to fight Joseph Chip in April 1914. When Joe Chip fell ill, his brother, Middleweight World Title holder George consented to the bout, probably considering it unlikely he would lose by knockout to nineteen year old McCoy. For Chip to lose his title in New York, a knockout would be required. In his last 100 bouts, McCoy had only a 23% knockout rate, impressive, but probably not perceived as a serious threat to the Middleweight World Champion Chip.

Manager Charlie Goldman wisely advised McCoy to charge for a knockout from the first bell, assuming that Chip would box cautiously early in the first round against Al's unorthodox, left handed style. Taking his manager's advice, on April 7, 1914, McCoy landed a powerful left to Chip's jaw early in the first round, lifting him off the canvas, and achieving a victory that probably shocked the bookmakers. The knockout occurred just one minute and fifty seconds into the first around. The Pittsburgh Press noted that the Broadway Sporting Club in Brooklyn was only "fairly filled" as spectators may have stayed home expecting a loss or poor showing by their hometown boy. Robert Edgren, summarizing the last few seconds of the fight, wrote "McCoy's left fist started somewhere near his knees. He brought it up with all his strength. His body swung upward with the blow as though he had been swinging at a bag. His fist landed fairly on the point of the crouching champion's unguarded chin."

The Gazette Times noted that McCoy's winning punch was a counterpunch, and wrote, "Chip, eager to grasp his opportunity, started a right swing that had all the earmarks of a haymaker. McCoy crossed in with his left, shooting over a hybrid punch which was half swing and half uppercut, and the New Castle fighter (Chip) went down flat, his head striking the floor of the ring." Aged 19, he became the youngest person as well as the first left handed-boxer ever to win a Middleweight World championship. It was also the shortest fight on record in which a boxer had taken a World Title from an opponent.

As the result of his youth, and unorthodox style, many boxing writers and fans considered McCoy's ascent to the world title a fluke. The Tacoma Times, were not alone in their sentiments when they wrote three a half full years after McCoy had taken the title, "Early in 1914, Chip (George) unfortunately ran into a punch in the first round of his bout with Al McCoy, and the latter assumed the title. McCoy was never a real champion and usually dodged anyone who was likely to knock him out."

The New York Evening World wrote ten months after he took the title from Chip, "McCoy has held the title technically, as no one has in turn knocked him out. But as a champion our old friend Al is a mirth-producing object."

Soldier Bartfield

His successful defense of the title for 42 consecutive bouts would prove he deserved the honor of Middleweight World Champion. In fact, at 42 bouts, according to Ken Blady, McCoy had the longest undefeated streak of any boxer to ever hold a title. While holding the championship, he allowed most of the world's top contenders to challenge him for it. He fought Soldier Bartfield twice on November 10, and 22, 1914 in Brooklyn losing by the decision of newspapers in ten round bouts. Though not gaining a decided edge in the two well fought bouts, the exceptional Bartfield was unable to land a knockout, and so McCoy retained the title. He took on top contenders Willie Lewis, Willie KO Brennan, Jewish contender Emmit "Kid" Wagner, and Italian Joe Gans, losing only to Brennan by the decision of newspapers in their middleweight matchups. His bout with Lewis on October 13, 1914, at the Broadway Sporting Club in Brooklyn, resulted in a near knockout of Lewis, once a top welterweight contender, in the fourth round. New London's The Day noted, "the bell saved Lewis in the fourth round. He was tottering, incapable of defense, when the bell rang. He came up for the final round (fifth) groggy", and McCoy consequently knocked him out, using his left to deliver the telling blow in the prior round.

On January 25, 1915, he defeated the talented Joe Borrell by the decision of newspapers in a six-round bout in Philadelphia. Borrel had ended the career of ex-welterweight world champion Harry Lewis two years earlier when Lewis had resumed boxing too soon after being injured in a car accident. McCoy's March 23, 1915, bout with Silent Martin may have been a closer affair, as the Evening News wrote that McCoy "had the better of Silent Martin in seven of the ten rounds in Brooklyn," though several New York papers gave the close bout to Martin.

On April 6, 1915, again in Brooklyn, McCoy fought a thrilling rematch with George Chip in Brooklyn, and though losing the ten round no-decision bout in the opinion of the New York Times, Chip could not knockout McCoy, and so he retained the world title. The following month on May 4, 1915, again in Brooklyn, he fought contender Jimmy Clabby, in another title match where he successfully defended against a knockout. The New London Day noted that McCoy's primary aim was to prevent a knockout, and that he did not fight with a decided edge. The paper wrote that with Clabby "McCoy entered the ring with the sole intention of employing every means to stay the limit, and he was successful." The Day further noted that the boxing seemed listless, and that when Clabby "showed an inclination to exchange blows at short range, McCoy usually declined the issue," but that "Clabby was the agressor (sic) at all times." Again fighting in Brooklyn, he faced top contenders Young Ahearn and Silent Martin, completing both title bouts without receiving a decisive knockout. In November 1915, he held off another challenge from Silent Martin.

== Later career and losing the Middleweight World Title ==
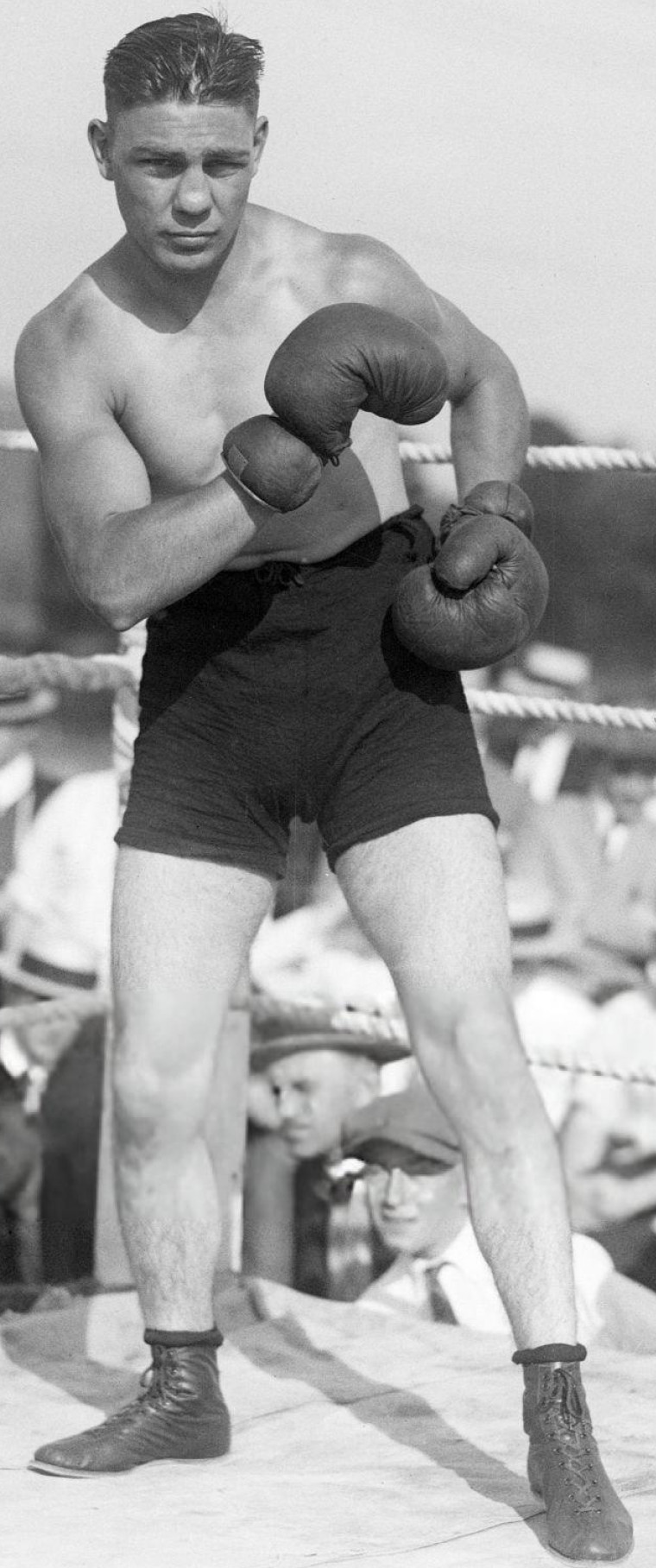
Harry Greb, 1926 Middleweight Champion

In 1916, he took on Young Ahearn in another title bout, and rematched with George Chip in a non-title fight, forgoing knockouts in both bouts, but not gaining an advantage in the decisions of the New York Times. His strenuous schedule with top contenders had begun to wear on McCoy. Through 1916, he fared better achieving several knockouts against opponents who were of less caliber, before taking on a critical bout with 1926 World Middleweight Champion Harry Greb on April 30, 1917. The Pittsburgh Post had Greb winning every round in a match where McCoy seemed clearly outmatched, but was unable to gain a knockout, even in the tenth round where he attempted in vain to land the telling blow.

McCoy finally lost his Middleweight Title on November 14, 1917, in his home city of Brooklyn against Mike O'Dowd, losing by a 6th-round knockout. The New London Day noted that McCoy was simply unable to fend off the blows of O'Dowd, writing "The men fought toe-to-toe from bell to bell, not because McCoy wished it thus, but because Mike kept boring in and swinging both hands to the head and body. Al tried to clinch after every lead, but O'Dowd forced the champion to break away by the fury of his attack." The Day further noted that McCoy took punishment in the first three rounds but that by the fourth took much heavier blows to the jaw and midsection. McCoy was down more than once in the fourth largely from blows to the face, but managed to knock O'Dowd down once with his signature left hook. In the sixth round, McCoy was down twice from head and body blows before finally having his cornermen throw in the towel at a count of six on his third knockdown.

He rematched with future middleweight champion Greb on May 13, 1918, demonstrating his willingness to take on top talent even after his loss of the title, but was again outmatched by his stronger, more aggressive opponent. Though Greb had already defeated some exceptional challengers, McCoy had suffered through forty-six defenses while champion from the toughest of title contenders.

== Later life ==
Retiring from East Coast boxing, McCoy moved to Los Angeles with his wife Ruth. Trying his hand at movies, he appeared in a role credited as "pug" in 20th Century Pictures' 1933 The Bowery. Also appearing in the movie were New York Jewish boxers Phil Bloom, Joe Glick, and Abe Hollandersky, "Fireman" Jim Flynn, and heavyweight Frank Moran. The film involved a rivalry between bar owner Chuck Connors and central character Steve Brody.

It was set in the New York Bowery, on the Lower East side of Manhattan, around the 1890s, and contained a lot of non-professional fighting. Actor George Walsh played real life character Steve Brodie, who indeed owned a Bowery bar and won fame jumping off the Brooklyn Bridge. The other primary character Chuck Connors, played by Wallace Beery, managed a professional boxer. In a brief bit, Walsh is revealed to be Irish heavyweight boxing champion John L. Sullivan.

On October 9, 1937 McCoy appeared in the "Night of Memories" benefit for Wad Wadhams, at Hollywood Legion Stadium. Wadhams was the victim of a stroke and had mounting medical bills. In his career, he had worked as a boxing promoter matching boxers for legendary boxing promoter "Colonel" Jack Doyle who had completed contracts for Jack Dempsey. Other featured boxers included Henry Armstrong, Jack Silver, Jimmy McLarnin, and Jackie Fields.

== Death ==
When McCoy lost his home and most of his possessions in a fire in 1964, his health took a turn for the worse. Living on only a small state pension, chronic illness restricted him to living in a nursing home. He died on August 22, 1966, in Los Angeles, California.

== Legacy and titles held ==
McCoy's professional record according to one source: 157 bouts — won 99 (26 KOs), lost 40, no-decisions 18. Note that newspaper decisions vary.

McCoy, who was Jewish, was inducted into the International Jewish Sports Hall of Fame in 1989.

== Professional boxing record ==
All information in this section is derived from BoxRec, unless otherwise stated.

=== Official Record ===
159 fights	31 wins	14 losses
By knockout	27	5
By decision	4	7
By disqualification	0	2
Draws	6	
Newspaper decisions/draws	108	

All newspaper decisions are officially regarded as “no decision” bouts and are not counted to the win/loss/draw column.

No.	Result	Record	Opponent	Type	Round	Date	Age	Location	Notes
159	Loss	31–14–6 (108)	Jack Matlock	PTS	3	Dec 9, 1924	30 years, 109 days	Denver, Colorado, U.S.	
158	Win	31–13–6 (108)	Al Beard	NWS	10	Nov 11, 1924	30 years, 81 days	Ellis, Kansas, U.S.	
157	Draw	31–13–6 (107)	Jack Downey	PTS	4	Feb 13, 1924	29 years, 175 days	Arena, Huntington Beach, California, U.S.	
156	Loss	31–13–5 (107)	Jack Brauchle	NWS	8	Nov 12, 1923	29 years, 82 days	Storm Lake, Iowa, U.S.	
155	Loss	31–13–5 (106)	Everett Strong	DQ	4 (8)	Aug 29, 1923	29 years, 7 days	Grand Opera House, Spencer, Iowa, U.S.	McCoy DQ'd for repeatedly hitting low during clinches
154	Win	31–12–5 (106)	George Truckenbrott	NWS	8	Jun 8, 1923	28 years, 290 days	Fort Dodge, Iowa, U.S.	
153	Loss	31–12–5 (105)	Eugene Brosseau	KO	2 (10)	Mar 22, 1920	25 years, 213 days	Monument National, Montreal, Quebec, Canada	
152	Loss	31–11–5 (105)	Frankie Fleming	NWS	8	Nov 3, 1919	25 years, 73 days	Bayonne, New Jersey, U.S.	
151	Loss	31–11–5 (104)	Mike O'Dowd	KO	3 (10)	Jul 17, 1919	24 years, 329 days	Lexington Park, Saint Paul, Minnesota, U.S.	
150	Loss	31–10–5 (104)	Joe Chip	TKO	6 (8)	Apr 29, 1919	24 years, 250 days	Elks' Club, Youngstown, Ohio, U.S.	
149	Win	31–9–5 (104)	Gordon McKay	NWS	8	Apr 4, 1919	24 years, 225 days	Summit Gymnasium, Jersey City, New Jersey, U.S.	
148	Loss	31–9–5 (103)	Leo Houck	NWS	6	Mar 31, 1919	24 years, 221 days	Frank Erne Club, Lancaster, Pennsylvania, U.S.	
147	Loss	31–9–5 (102)	Young Fisher	NWS	10	Feb 17, 1919	24 years, 179 days	Arena, Syracuse, New York, U.S.	
146	Loss	31–9–5 (101)	Jack Dillon	NWS	10	Aug 21, 1918	23 years, 364 days	Muncie A.C., Muncie, Indiana, U.S.	
145	Draw	31–9–5 (100)	Jack Dillon	NWS	10	Jul 4, 1918	23 years, 316 days	Charleston, West Virginia, U.S.	
144	Loss	31–9–5 (99)	Harry Greb	PTS	10	May 13, 1918	23 years, 264 days	People's Theater, Cincinnati, Ohio, U.S.	
143	Loss	31–8–5 (99)	Edward K.O. Kruvosky	PTS	4	Mar 1, 1918	23 years, 191 days	Dreamland Rink, San Francisco, California, U.S.	
142	Draw	31–7–5 (99)	Jack Downey	PTS	4	Jan 30, 1918	23 years, 161 days	Dreamland Arena, San Diego, California, U.S.	
141	Loss	31–7–4 (99)	Battling Ortega	PTS	4	Jan 9, 1918	23 years, 140 days	Arena, Emeryville, California, U.S.	
140	Loss	31–6–4 (99)	Mike O'Dowd	KO	6 (10)	Nov 14, 1917	23 years, 84 days	Clermont Avenue Rink, New York City, New York, U.S.	Lost NYSAC middleweight title
139	Win	31–5–4 (99)	Montana Dan Sullivan	PTS	12	Nov 8, 1917	23 years, 78 days	North Adams, Massachusetts, U.S.	
138	Loss	30–5–4 (99)	Jackie Clark	NWS	10	Jul 4, 1917	22 years, 316 days	Lonaconing, Maryland, U.S.	
137	Loss	30–5–4 (98)	Harry Greb	NWS	10	Apr 30, 1917	22 years, 251 days	Exposition Hall, Pittsburgh, Pennsylvania, U.S.	
136	Loss	30–5–4 (97)	Jack Dillon	NWS	10	Feb 27, 1917	22 years, 189 days	Broadway S.C., New York City, New York, U.S.	
135	Draw	30–5–4 (96)	Jack McCarron	NWS	10	Nov 28, 1916	22 years, 98 days	Allentown, Pennsylvania, U.S.	
134	Win	30–5–4 (95)	Johnny Saxon	TKO	7 (10)	Oct 21, 1916	22 years, 60 days	West New Brighton S.C., New York City, New York, U.S.	
133	Loss	29–5–4 (95)	Jackie Clark	NWS	10	Sep 28, 1916	22 years, 37 days	Scranton, Pennsylvania, U.S.	
132	Win	29–5–4 (94)	Jack Hanlon	KO	3 (10)	Sep 25, 1916	22 years, 34 days	Military A.C., New York City, New York, U.S.	
131	Win	28–5–4 (94)	Dave Kurtz	NWS	15	Jul 3, 1916	21 years, 316 days	Harlem S.C., Rockaway Beach, New York City, New York, U.S.	
130	Loss	28–5–4 (93)	Hugh Ross	NWS	15	Jun 26, 1916	21 years, 309 days	Casino Hall, Bridgeport, Connecticut, U.S.	
129	Draw	28–5–4 (92)	Young Al Ross	PTS	20	May 22, 1916	21 years, 274 days	Arena, New Haven, Connecticut, U.S.	
128	Loss	28–5–3 (92)	Young Ahearn	NWS	10	May 9, 1916	21 years, 261 days	Broadway Arena, New York City, New York, U.S.	
127	Draw	28–5–3 (91)	Al Thiel	NWS	10	Apr 17, 1916	21 years, 239 days	Military A.C., New York City, New York, U.S.	
126	Win	28–5–3 (90)	Jack Hammond	KO	2 (10)	Apr 7, 1916	21 years, 229 days	East New York A.C., New York City, New York, U.S.	
125	Draw	27–5–3 (90)	Leo Bens	NWS	10	Mar 21, 1916	21 years, 212 days	Broadway Arena, New York City, New York, U.S.	
124	Win	27–5–3 (89)	Freddie Kiebler	NWS	10	Jan 28, 1916	21 years, 159 days	East New York A.C., New York City, New York, U.S.	
123	Loss	27–5–3 (88)	George Chip	NWS	10	Jan 20, 1916	21 years, 151 days	Broadway Arena, New York City, New York, U.S.	
122	Loss	27–5–3 (87)	Young Ahearn	NWS	10	Jan 1, 1916	21 years, 132 days	Broadway Arena, New York City, New York, U.S.	NYSAC middleweight title at stake; (via KO only)
121	Loss	27–5–3 (86)	Silent Martin	NWS	15	Nov 25, 1915	21 years, 95 days	Auditorium, Waterbury, Connecticut, U.S.	NYSAC middleweight title at stake; (via KO only)
120	Draw	27–5–3 (85)	Zulu Kid	NWS	10	Nov 13, 1915	21 years, 83 days	Clermont Avenue Rink, New York City, New York, U.S.	
119	Loss	27–5–3 (84)	K.O. Sullivan	PTS	15	Oct 26, 1915	21 years, 65 days	Capitol City A.C., Ardmore, Maryland, U.S.	
118	Draw	27–4–3 (84)	Jakob "Soldier" Bartfield	NWS	10	Oct 23, 1915	21 years, 62 days	Clermont Avenue Rink, New York City, New York, U.S.	NYSAC middleweight title at stake; (via KO only)
117	Loss	27–4–3 (83)	Young Ahearn	NWS	10	Sep 9, 1915	21 years, 18 days	Ebbets Field, New York City, New York, U.S.	NYSAC middleweight title at stake; (via KO only)
116	Draw	27–4–3 (82)	Silent Martin	NWS	10	May 31, 1915	20 years, 282 days	Ebbets Field, New York City, New York, U.S.	NYSAC middleweight title at stake; (via KO only)
115	Loss	27–4–3 (81)	Jimmy Clabby	NWS	10	May 4, 1915	20 years, 255 days	Broadway S.C., New York City, New York, U.S.	NYSAC middleweight title at stake; (via KO only)
114	Loss	27–4–3 (80)	George Chip	NWS	10	Apr 6, 1915	20 years, 227 days	Broadway S.C., New York City, New York, U.S.	NYSAC middleweight title at stake; (via KO only)
113	Loss	27–4–3 (79)	Silent Martin	NWS	10	Mar 23, 1915	20 years, 213 days	Broadway S.C., New York City, New York, U.S.	
112	Win	27–4–3 (78)	Al Thiel	NWS	10	Feb 16, 1915	20 years, 178 days	Broadway S.C., New York City, New York, U.S.	
111	Win	27–4–3 (77)	Joe Borrell	NWS	6	Jan 25, 1915	20 years, 156 days	Olympia A.C., Philadelphia, Pennsylvania, U.S.	
110	Win	27–4–3 (76)	Billy Grupp	NWS	10	Jan 23, 1915	20 years, 154 days	Federal A.C., New York City, New York, U.S.	
109	Loss	27–4–3 (75)	Jakob "Soldier" Bartfield	NWS	10	Dec 22, 1914	20 years, 122 days	Broadway Arena, New York City, New York, U.S.	
108	Win	27–4–3 (74)	Italian Joe Gans	NWS	10	Dec 11, 1914	20 years, 111 days	Federal A.C., New York City, New York, U.S.	
107	Win	27–4–3 (73)	Emmett "Kid" Wagner	NWS	10	Dec 4, 1914	20 years, 104 days	Coliseum A.C., Wilkes-Barre, Pennsylvania, U.S.	
106	Loss	27–4–3 (72)	Bill Fleming	NWS	10	Dec 1, 1914	20 years, 101 days	German Hall, Albany, New York, U.S.	
105	Loss	27–4–3 (71)	Jakob "Soldier" Bartfield	NWS	10	Nov 10, 1914	20 years, 80 days	Broadway Auditorium, Buffalo, New York, U.S.	
104	Loss	27–4–3 (70)	Willie K.O. Brennan	NWS	10	Oct 19, 1914	20 years, 58 days	Broadway Auditorium, Buffalo, New York, U.S.	
103	Win	27–4–3 (69)	Willie Lewis	KO	5 (10)	Oct 13, 1914	20 years, 52 days	Broadway S.C., New York City, New York, U.S.	
102	Loss	26–4–3 (69)	Billy Murray	NWS	10	Jun 11, 1914	19 years, 262 days	St. Nicholas Arena, New York City, New York, U.S.	
101	Loss	26–4–3 (68)	Billy Murray	NWS	10	May 21, 1914	19 years, 272 days	St. Nicholas Arena, New York City, New York, U.S.	
100	Win	26–4–3 (67)	George Pearsall	KO	1 (10)	May 8, 1914	19 years, 259 days	Roodner's Hall, Norwalk, Connecticut, U.S.	
99	Win	25–4–3 (67)	George Chip	KO	1 (10)	Apr 7, 1914	19 years, 228 days	Broadway S.C., New York City, New York, U.S.	Won NYSAC middleweight title
98	Win	24–4–3 (67)	Tommy Teague	NWS	10	Apr 3, 1914	19 years, 224 days	East New York A.C., New York City, New York, U.S.	
97	Draw	24–4–3 (66)	Joe Chip	NWS	10	Feb 28, 1914	19 years, 190 days	Broadway S.C., New York City, New York, U.S.	
96	Loss	24–4–3 (65)	Mike Gibbons	NWS	10	Feb 23, 1914	19 years, 185 days	Irving A.C., New York City, New York, U.S.	
95	Win	24–4–3 (64)	Jack Smith	NWS	10	Feb 7, 1914	19 years, 169 days	Irving A.C., New York City, New York, U.S.	
94	Win	24–4–3 (63)	Johnny Shaw	KO	3 (10)	Jan 31, 1914	19 years, 162 days	Brighton S.C., New York City, New York, U.S.	
93	Draw	23–4–3 (63)	Eddie Nearing	NWS	10	Jan 24, 1914	19 years, 155 days	Dexter Park Arena, Woodhaven, New York City, New York, U.S.	
92	Draw	23–4–3 (62)	Zulu Kid	NWS	10	Dec 19, 1913	19 years, 119 days	East New York A.C., New York City, New York, U.S.	
91	Win	23–4–3 (61)	Bull Anderson	NWS	10	Nov 19, 1913	19 years, 89 days	Vanderbilt A.C., New York City, New York, U.S.	
90	Win	23–4–3 (60)	Mike Farrell	NWS	10	Nov 7, 1913	19 years, 77 days	East New York A.C., New York City, New York, U.S.	
89	Win	23–4–3 (59)	Freddie Kiebler	NWS	10	Nov 1, 1913	19 years, 71 days	Brown's Gym, New York City, New York, U.S.	
88	Draw	23–4–3 (58)	Willie K.O. Brennan	NWS	10	Oct 18, 1913	19 years, 57 days	Irving A.C., New York City, New York, U.S.	
87	Win	23–4–3 (57)	Noah Brusso	PTS	10	Sep 25, 1913	19 years, 34 days	Atlas A.A., Boston, Massachusetts, U.S.	
86	Win	22–4–3 (57)	Johnny Stewart	NWS	6	Sep 9, 1913	19 years, 18 days	Bangor, Maine, U.S.	
85	Win	22–4–3 (56)	Bill Fleming	NWS	6	Aug 26, 1913	19 years, 4 days	Bangor, Maine, U.S.	
84	Win	22–4–3 (55)	Billy Grupp	NWS	10	Aug 12, 1913	18 years, 355 days	Atlantic Garden A.C., New York City, New York, U.S.	
83	Win	22–4–3 (54)	Jakob "Soldier" Bartfield	NWS	10	Aug 11, 1913	18 years, 354 days	Military A.C., New York City, New York, U.S.	
82	Win	22–4–3 (53)	Bull Anderson	NWS	10	Aug 9, 1913	18 years, 352 days	Irving A.C., New York City, New York, U.S.	
81	Draw	22–4–3 (52)	Mike Farrell	NWS	10	Jul 22, 1913	18 years, 334 days	Atlantic A.A., Rockaway Beach, New York City, New York, U.S.	
80	Win	22–4–3 (51)	Billy Sherman	KO	2 (10)	Jun 27, 1913	18 years, 309 days	Brown's Gym A.A., Far Rockaway, New York City, New York, U.S.	
79	Win	21–4–3 (51)	Terry Mitchell	NWS	10	Jun 6, 1913	18 years, 288 days	East New York A.C., New York City, New York, U.S.	
78	Draw	21–4–3 (50)	Wildcat Ferns	PTS	20	May 28, 1913	18 years, 279 days	Dayton, Ohio, U.S.	
77	Win	21–4–2 (50)	Eddie Mack	KO	4 (10)	May 16, 1913	18 years, 267 days	East New York A.C., New York City, New York, U.S.	
76	Loss	20–4–2 (50)	Young Ahearn	NWS	10	May 14, 1913	18 years, 265 days	St. Nicholas Arena, New York City, New York, U.S.	
75	Win	20–4–2 (49)	Battling Larry Ryan	NWS	10	Apr 29, 1913	18 years, 250 days	Military A.C., New York City, New York, U.S.	
74	Win	20–4–2 (48)	Bull Anderson	NWS	10	Mar 7, 1913	18 years, 197 days	East New York A.C., New York City, New York, U.S.	
73	Win	20–4–2 (47)	Harry Thiel	NWS	6	Feb 22, 1913	18 years, 184 days	National A.C., New York City, New York, U.S.	
72	Win	20–4–2 (46)	Al Thiel	NWS	10	Feb 7, 1913	18 years, 169 days	East New York A.C., New York City, New York, U.S.	
71	Draw	20–4–2 (45)	Wildcat Ferns	PTS	15	Jan 22, 1913	18 years, 153 days	Dayton, Ohio, U.S.	
70	Draw	20–4–1 (45)	Harry Price	NWS	10	Jan 8, 1913	18 years, 139 days	Royale A.C., New York City, New York, U.S.	
69	Loss	20–4–1 (44)	Young McCartney	NWS	6	Jan 1, 1913	18 years, 132 days	National A.C., Philadelphia, Pennsylvania, U.S.	
68	Loss	20–4–1 (43)	Joe White	DQ	8 (10)	Dec 25, 1912	18 years, 125 days	Brooklyn Beach A.C., New York City, New York, U.S.	
67	Win	20–3–1 (43)	Jack Smith	NWS	10	Dec 6, 1912	18 years, 104 days	East New York A.C., New York City, New York, U.S.	
66	Draw	20–3–1 (42)	Gus Christie	PTS	15	Dec 4, 1912	18 years, 104 days	Dayton, Ohio, U.S.	
65	Win	20–3 (42)	Sailor Jack Howard	KO	10 (10)	Nov 23, 1912	18 years, 93 days	Irving A.C., New York City, New York, U.S.	
64	Win	19–3 (42)	Young Erne	NWS	6	Nov 9, 1912	18 years, 79 days	National A.C., Philadelphia, Pennsylvania, U.S.	
63	Win	19–3 (41)	Marty Brown	NWS	10	Nov 2, 1912	18 years, 72 days	National A.C., New York City, New York, U.S.	
62	Draw	19–3 (40)	Joe Stein	NWS	10	Oct 18, 1912	18 years, 57 days	Madison Square Garden, New York City, New York, U.S.	
61	Win	19–3 (39)	Johnny Shaw	KO	3 (10)	Oct 16, 1912	18 years, 55 days	Royale A.C., New York City, New York, U.S.	
60	Win	18–3 (39)	Charley Sieger	KO	3 (10)	Sep 28, 1912	18 years, 37 days	National A.C., New York City, New York, U.S.	
59	Win	17–3 (39)	Bill Fleming	NWS	6	Sep 10, 1912	18 years, 19 days	Eastport, Maine, U.S.	
58	Draw	17–3 (38)	Paddy Sullivan	NWS	10	Aug 13, 1912	17 years, 357 days	Atlas A.C., Rockaway Beach, New York City, New York, U.S.	
57	Win	17–3 (37)	Dave Kurtz	NWS	10	Aug 12, 1912	17 years, 356 days	Madison Square Garden, New York City, New York, U.S.	
56	Win	17–3 (36)	Mike Farrell	NWS	10	Jul 19, 1912	17 years, 332 days	Atlantic A.A., Rockaway Beach, New York City, New York, U.S.	
55	Draw	17–3 (35)	Young Hickey	NWS	10	Jul 13, 1912	17 years, 326 days	Fairmont A.C., New York City, New York, U.S.	
54	Win	17–3 (34)	Battling Jack Nelson	KO	4 (10)	Jul 5, 1912	17 years, 318 days	Atlantic A.A., Rockaway Beach, New York City, New York, U.S.	
53	Win	16–3 (34)	Joe Kastner	NWS	10	Jun 25, 1912	17 years, 308 days	Jamaica A.C., Jamaica, New York City, New York, U.S.	
52	Loss	16–3 (33)	Willie Fitzgerald	NWS	10	Jun 15, 1912	17 years, 298 days	Gowanus A.C., New York City, New York, U.S.	
51	Win	16–3 (32)	Eddie Hanlon	KO	2 (10)	Jun 1, 1912	17 years, 284 days	American A.A., New York City, New York, U.S.	
50	Win	15–3 (32)	Rudolph Hinz	NWS	10	May 2, 1912	17 years, 254 days	American A.A., New York City, New York, U.S.	
49	Win	15–3 (31)	Johnny Waltz	KO	2 (10)	Apr 19, 1912	17 years, 241 days	American A.A., New York City, New York, U.S.	
48	Loss	14–3 (31)	Young Otto	NWS	10	Mar 29, 1912	17 years, 220 days	Queensboro A.C., Long Island City, New York City, New York, U.S.	
47	Win	14–3 (30)	Terry McGraw	NWS	10	Mar 2, 1912	17 years, 193 days	National A.C., New York City, New York, U.S.	
46	Win	14–3 (29)	Sailor Eddie Maher	KO	2 (4)	Feb 26, 1912	17 years, 188 days	Irving A.C., New York City, New York, U.S.	
45	Win	13–3 (29)	Jack Smith	TKO	2 (10)	Feb 10, 1912	17 years, 172 days	National A.C., New York City, New York, U.S.	
44	Loss	12–3 (29)	Young Joe Grim	NWS	6	Jan 13, 1912	17 years, 144 days	National A.C., New York City, New York, U.S.	
43	Win	12–3 (28)	Young DeGrand	KO	3 (10)	Jan 6, 1912	17 years, 137 days	National A.C., New York City, New York, U.S.	
42	Win	11–3 (28)	Jack Beckman	KO	2 (4)	Jan 13, 1912	17 years, 144 days	National A.C., New York City, New York, U.S.	
41	Draw	10–3 (28)	Henry Hall	NWS	6	Nov 30, 1911	17 years, 100 days	Eastport, Maine, U.S.	
40	Win	10–3 (27)	Chester Walcott	NWS	6	Nov 20, 1911	17 years, 90 days	Eastport, Maine, U.S.	
39	Win	10–3 (26)	Jim Smith	KO	1 (6)	Nov 11, 1911	17 years, 81 days	Eastern Parkway A.C., New York City, New York, U.S.	
38	Draw	9–3 (26)	Johnny Stewart	NWS	6	Oct 23, 1911	17 years, 62 days	Eastport, Maine, U.S.	Exact date unknown
37	Win	9–3 (25)	George Niedoff	NWS	12	Aug 28, 1911	17 years, 6 days	Eastport, Maine, U.S.	
36	Win	9–3 (24)	Al King	NWS	6	Aug 11, 1911	16 years, 354 days	Brighton Beach A.C., New York City, New York, U.S.	
35	Win	9–3 (23)	Jim McGuinness	KO	6 (6)	Aug 9, 1911	16 years, 352 days	Pembroke, Maine, U.S.	
34	Win	8–3 (23)	Jim McGuinness	KO	1 (6)	Aug 3, 1911	16 years, 346 days	Pembroke, Maine, U.S.	
33	Win	7–3 (23)	George Niedoff	NWS	6	Jun 20, 1911	16 years, 302 days	Eastport, Maine, U.S.	
32	Draw	7–3 (22)	Yankee Gilbert	NWS	4	Jun 2, 1911	16 years, 284 days	Atlantic A.A., Rockaway Beach, New York City, New York, U.S.	
31	Draw	7–3 (21)	Al King	NWS	4	May 20, 1911	16 years, 271 days	National A.C., New York City, New York, U.S.	
30	Loss	7–3 (20)	Bill Fleming	NWS	6	May 15, 1911	16 years, 266 days	Old Town, Maine, U.S.	
29	Win	7–3 (19)	Jack Ryan	KO	2 (6)	May 6, 1911	16 years, 257 days	Portland, Maine, U.S.	
28	Draw	6–3 (19)	Johnny Gallant	NWS	6	Apr 28, 1911	16 years, 249 days	Biddeford, Maine, U.S.	
27	Loss	6–3 (18)	Mike Farrell	NWS	6	Mar 25, 1911	16 years, 215 days	New York A.C., New York City, New York, U.S.	
26	Draw	6–3 (17)	Monk Green	NWS	4	Mar 18, 1911	16 years, 208 days	National A.C., New York City, New York, U.S.	
25	Win	6–3 (16)	Al King	NWS	6	Mar 7, 1911	16 years, 197 days	Brown's Gym, New York City, New York, U.S.	
24	Loss	6–3 (15)	Al King	NWS	4	Feb 25, 1911	16 years, 187 days	National A.C., New York City, New York, U.S.	
23	Loss	6–3 (14)	Johnny Glover	NWS	6	Feb 11, 1911	16 years, 173 days	Portland, Maine, U.S.	
22	Draw	6–3 (13)	Johnny Fraser	NWS	6	Feb 4, 1911	16 years, 166 days	Portland, Maine, U.S.	
21	Draw	6–3 (12)	Young Hugo Kelly	NWS	6	Jan 21, 1911	16 years, 152 days	Biddeford, Maine, U.S.	
20	Win	6–3 (11)	Billy Shea	NWS	6	Jan 14, 1911	16 years, 145 days	Portland, Maine, U.S.	
19	Draw	6–3 (10)	Shadow McCormick	NWS	6	Jan 13, 1911	16 years, 144 days	Auburn, New York, U.S.	
18	Win	6–3 (9)	Kid Ryan	KO	3 (6)	Jan 7, 1911	16 years, 138 days	Portland, Maine, U.S.	
17	Win	5–3 (9)	Battling Pete	KO	5 (6)	Dec 27, 1910	16 years, 127 days	Brown's Gym, New York City, New York, U.S.	
16	Draw	4–3 (9)	Battling Pete	NWS	4	Dec 23, 1910	16 years, 123 days	Eastern Parkway A.C., New York City, New York, U.S.	
15	Loss	4–3 (8)	Bull Anderson	NWS	6	Dec 9, 1910	16 years, 109 days	Eastern Parkway A.C., New York City, New York, U.S.	
14	Win	4–3 (7)	Monk Green	NWS	6	Dec 2, 1910	16 years, 102 days	Eastern Parkway A.C., New York City, New York, U.S.	
13	Win	4–3 (6)	Young Buck	KO	1 (6)	Nov 25, 1910	16 years, 95 days	Eastern Parkway A.C., New York City, New York, U.S.	
12	Win	3–3 (6)	Jim Warner	KO	3 (4)	Nov 18, 1910	16 years, 88 days	Eastern Parkway A.C., New York City, New York, U.S.	
11	Draw	2–3 (6)	Terry Brooks	NWS	6	Nov 12, 1910	16 years, 82 days	Eastport, Maine, U.S.	
10	Win	2–3 (5)	Battling Pete	NWS	6	Nov 11, 1910	16 years, 81 days	Eastern Parkway A.C., New York City, New York, U.S.	
9	Win	2–3 (4)	Kid Parsons	NWS	6	Nov 8, 1910	16 years, 78 days	Portland, Maine, U.S.	
8	Win	2–3 (3)	Kid Parsons	NWS	6	Nov 5, 1910	16 years, 75 days	Portland, Maine, U.S.	
7	Win	2–3 (2)	Jim Rippin	NWS	6	Oct 8, 1910	16 years, 47 days	Portland, Maine, U.S.	
6	Draw	2–3 (1)	Young Hugo Kelly	NWS	6	Sep 21, 1910	16 years, 30 days	Portland, Maine, U.S.	
5	Win	2–3	Young Hugo Kelly	PTS	6	Sep 10, 1910	16 years, 19 days	Portland, Maine, U.S.	
4	Loss	1–3	Marty O'Brien	KO	3 (6)	Aug 8, 1910	15 years, 351 days	Knickerbocker A.C., Albany, New York, U.S.	
3	Loss	1–2	Chester Walcott	PTS	6	Jul 21, 1910	15 years, 333 days	American A.C., Boston, Massachusetts, U.S.	
2	Win	1–1	Benny Burke	PTS	4	Jun 30, 1910	15 years, 312 days	American A.C., Boston, Massachusetts, U.S.	
1	Loss	0–1	Gus Murphy	PTS	6	Jun 14, 1910	15 years, 296 days	Armory A.A., Boston, Massachusetts, U.S.	

=== Unofficial record ===
159 fights	76 wins	49 losses
By knockout	27	5
By decision	49	42
By disqualification	0	2
Draws	34	

Record with the inclusion of newspaper decisions to the win/loss/draw column.

No.	Result	Record	Opponent	Type	Round	Date	Age	Location	Notes
159	Loss	76–49–34	Jack Matlock	PTS	3	Dec 9, 1924	30 years, 109 days	Denver, Colorado, U.S.	
158	Win	76–48–34	Al Beard	NWS	10	Nov 11, 1924	30 years, 81 days	Ellis, Kansas, U.S.	
157	Draw	75–48–34	Jack Downey	PTS	4	Feb 13, 1924	29 years, 175 days	Arena, Huntington Beach, California, U.S.	
156	Loss	75–48–33	Jack Brauchle	NWS	8	Nov 12, 1923	29 years, 82 days	Storm Lake, Iowa, U.S.	
155	Loss	75–47–33	Everett Strong	DQ	4 (8)	Aug 29, 1923	29 years, 7 days	Grand Opera House, Spencer, Iowa, U.S.	McCoy DQ'd for repeatedly hitting low during clinches
154	Win	75–46–33	George Truckenbrott	NWS	8	Jun 8, 1923	28 years, 290 days	Fort Dodge, Iowa, U.S.	
153	Loss	74–46–33	Eugene Brosseau	KO	2 (10)	Mar 22, 1920	25 years, 213 days	Monument National, Montreal, Quebec, Canada	
152	Loss	74–45–33	Frankie Fleming	NWS	8	Nov 3, 1919	25 years, 73 days	Bayonne, New Jersey, U.S.	
151	Loss	74–44–33	Mike O'Dowd	KO	3 (10)	Jul 17, 1919	24 years, 329 days	Lexington Park, Saint Paul, Minnesota, U.S.	
150	Loss	74–43–33	Joe Chip	TKO	6 (8)	Apr 29, 1919	24 years, 250 days	Elks' Club, Youngstown, Ohio, U.S.	
149	Win	74–42–33	Gordon McKay	NWS	8	Apr 4, 1919	24 years, 225 days	Summit Gymnasium, Jersey City, New Jersey, U.S.	
148	Loss	73–42–33	Leo Houck	NWS	6	Mar 31, 1919	24 years, 221 days	Frank Erne Club, Lancaster, Pennsylvania, U.S.	
147	Loss	73–41–33	Young Fisher	NWS	10	Feb 17, 1919	24 years, 179 days	Arena, Syracuse, New York, U.S.	
146	Loss	73–40–33	Jack Dillon	NWS	10	Aug 21, 1918	23 years, 364 days	Muncie A.C., Muncie, Indiana, U.S.	
145	Draw	73–39–33	Jack Dillon	NWS	10	Jul 4, 1918	23 years, 316 days	Charleston, West Virginia, U.S.	
144	Loss	73–39–32	Harry Greb	PTS	10	May 13, 1918	23 years, 264 days	People's Theater, Cincinnati, Ohio, U.S.	
143	Loss	73–38–32	Edward K.O. Kruvosky	PTS	4	Mar 1, 1918	23 years, 191 days	Dreamland Rink, San Francisco, California, U.S.	
142	Draw	73–37–32	Jack Downey	PTS	4	Jan 30, 1918	23 years, 161 days	Dreamland Arena, San Diego, California, U.S.	
141	Loss	73–37–31	Battling Ortega	PTS	4	Jan 9, 1918	23 years, 140 days	Arena, Emeryville, California, U.S.	
140	Loss	73–36–31	Mike O'Dowd	KO	6 (10)	Nov 14, 1917	23 years, 84 days	Clermont Avenue Rink, New York City, New York, U.S.	Lost NYSAC middleweight title
139	Win	73–35–31	Montana Dan Sullivan	PTS	12	Nov 8, 1917	23 years, 78 days	North Adams, Massachusetts, U.S.	
138	Loss	72–35–31	Jackie Clark	NWS	10	Jul 4, 1917	22 years, 316 days	Lonaconing, Maryland, U.S.	
137	Loss	72–34–31	Harry Greb	NWS	10	Apr 30, 1917	22 years, 251 days	Exposition Hall, Pittsburgh, Pennsylvania, U.S.	
136	Loss	72–33–31	Jack Dillon	NWS	10	Feb 27, 1917	22 years, 189 days	Broadway S.C., New York City, New York, U.S.	
135	Draw	72–32–31	Jack McCarron	NWS	10	Nov 28, 1916	22 years, 98 days	Allentown, Pennsylvania, U.S.	
134	Win	72–32–30	Johnny Saxon	TKO	7 (10)	Oct 21, 1916	22 years, 60 days	West New Brighton S.C., New York City, New York, U.S.	
133	Loss	71–32–30	Jackie Clark	NWS	10	Sep 28, 1916	22 years, 37 days	Scranton, Pennsylvania, U.S.	
132	Win	71–31–30	Jack Hanlon	KO	3 (10)	Sep 25, 1916	22 years, 34 days	Military A.C., New York City, New York, U.S.	
131	Win	70–31–30	Dave Kurtz	NWS	15	Jul 3, 1916	21 years, 316 days	Harlem S.C., Rockaway Beach, New York City, New York, U.S.	
130	Loss	69–31–30	Hugh Ross	NWS	15	Jun 26, 1916	21 years, 309 days	Casino Hall, Bridgeport, Connecticut, U.S.	
129	Draw	69–30–30	Young Al Ross	PTS	20	May 22, 1916	21 years, 274 days	Arena, New Haven, Connecticut, U.S.	
128	Loss	69–30–29	Young Ahearn	NWS	10	May 9, 1916	21 years, 261 days	Broadway Arena, New York City, New York, U.S.	
127	Draw	69–29–29	Al Thiel	NWS	10	Apr 17, 1916	21 years, 239 days	Military A.C., New York City, New York, U.S.	
126	Win	69–29–28	Jack Hammond	KO	2 (10)	Apr 7, 1916	21 years, 229 days	East New York A.C., New York City, New York, U.S.	
125	Draw	68–29–28	Leo Bens	NWS	10	Mar 21, 1916	21 years, 212 days	Broadway Arena, New York City, New York, U.S.	
124	Win	68–29–27	Freddie Kiebler	NWS	10	Jan 28, 1916	21 years, 159 days	East New York A.C., New York City, New York, U.S.	
123	Loss	67–29–27	George Chip	NWS	10	Jan 20, 1916	21 years, 151 days	Broadway Arena, New York City, New York, U.S.	
122	Loss	67–28–27	Young Ahearn	NWS	10	Jan 1, 1916	21 years, 132 days	Broadway Arena, New York City, New York, U.S.	NYSAC middleweight title at stake; (via KO only)
121	Loss	67–27–27	Silent Martin	NWS	15	Nov 25, 1915	21 years, 95 days	Auditorium, Waterbury, Connecticut, U.S.	NYSAC middleweight title at stake; (via KO only)
120	Draw	67–26–27	Zulu Kid	NWS	10	Nov 13, 1915	21 years, 83 days	Clermont Avenue Rink, New York City, New York, U.S.	
119	Loss	67–26–26	K.O. Sullivan	PTS	15	Oct 26, 1915	21 years, 65 days	Capitol City A.C., Ardmore, Maryland, U.S.	
118	Draw	67–25–26	Jakob "Soldier" Bartfield	NWS	10	Oct 23, 1915	21 years, 62 days	Clermont Avenue Rink, New York City, New York, U.S.	NYSAC middleweight title at stake; (via KO only)
117	Loss	67–25–25	Young Ahearn	NWS	10	Sep 9, 1915	21 years, 18 days	Ebbets Field, New York City, New York, U.S.	NYSAC middleweight title at stake; (via KO only)
116	Draw	67–24–25	Silent Martin	NWS	10	May 31, 1915	20 years, 282 days	Ebbets Field, New York City, New York, U.S.	NYSAC middleweight title at stake; (via KO only)
115	Loss	67–24–24	Jimmy Clabby	NWS	10	May 4, 1915	20 years, 255 days	Broadway S.C., New York City, New York, U.S.	NYSAC middleweight title at stake; (via KO only)
114	Loss	67–23–24	George Chip	NWS	10	Apr 6, 1915	20 years, 227 days	Broadway S.C., New York City, New York, U.S.	NYSAC middleweight title at stake; (via KO only)
113	Loss	67–22–24	Silent Martin	NWS	10	Mar 23, 1915	20 years, 213 days	Broadway S.C., New York City, New York, U.S.	
112	Win	67–21–24	Al Thiel	NWS	10	Feb 16, 1915	20 years, 178 days	Broadway S.C., New York City, New York, U.S.	
111	Win	66–21–24	Joe Borrell	NWS	6	Jan 25, 1915	20 years, 156 days	Olympia A.C., Philadelphia, Pennsylvania, U.S.	
110	Win	65–21–24	Billy Grupp	NWS	10	Jan 23, 1915	20 years, 154 days	Federal A.C., New York City, New York, U.S.	
109	Loss	64–21–24	Jakob "Soldier" Bartfield	NWS	10	Dec 22, 1914	20 years, 122 days	Broadway Arena, New York City, New York, U.S.	
108	Win	64–20–24	Italian Joe Gans	NWS	10	Dec 11, 1914	20 years, 111 days	Federal A.C., New York City, New York, U.S.	
107	Win	63–20–24	Emmett "Kid" Wagner	NWS	10	Dec 4, 1914	20 years, 104 days	Coliseum A.C., Wilkes-Barre, Pennsylvania, U.S.	
106	Loss	62–20–24	Bill Fleming	NWS	10	Dec 1, 1914	20 years, 101 days	German Hall, Albany, New York, U.S.	
105	Loss	62–19–24	Jakob "Soldier" Bartfield	NWS	10	Nov 10, 1914	20 years, 80 days	Broadway Auditorium, Buffalo, New York, U.S.	
104	Loss	62–18–24	Willie K.O. Brennan	NWS	10	Oct 19, 1914	20 years, 58 days	Broadway Auditorium, Buffalo, New York, U.S.	
103	Win	62–17–24	Willie Lewis	KO	5 (10)	Oct 13, 1914	20 years, 52 days	Broadway S.C., New York City, New York, U.S.	
102	Loss	61–17–24	Billy Murray	NWS	10	Jun 11, 1914	19 years, 262 days	St. Nicholas Arena, New York City, New York, U.S.	
101	Loss	61–16–24	Billy Murray	NWS	10	May 21, 1914	19 years, 272 days	St. Nicholas Arena, New York City, New York, U.S.	
100	Win	61–15–24	George Pearsall	KO	1 (10)	May 8, 1914	19 years, 259 days	Roodner's Hall, Norwalk, Connecticut, U.S.	
99	Win	60–15–24	George Chip	KO	1 (10)	Apr 7, 1914	19 years, 228 days	Broadway S.C., New York City, New York, U.S.	Won NYSAC middleweight title
98	Win	59–15–24	Tommy Teague	NWS	10	Apr 3, 1914	19 years, 224 days	East New York A.C., New York City, New York, U.S.	
97	Draw	58–15–24	Joe Chip	NWS	10	Feb 28, 1914	19 years, 190 days	Broadway S.C., New York City, New York, U.S.	
96	Loss	58–15–23	Mike Gibbons	NWS	10	Feb 23, 1914	19 years, 185 days	Irving A.C., New York City, New York, U.S.	
95	Win	58–14–23	Jack Smith	NWS	10	Feb 7, 1914	19 years, 169 days	Irving A.C., New York City, New York, U.S.	
94	Win	57–14–23	Johnny Shaw	KO	3 (10)	Jan 31, 1914	19 years, 162 days	Brighton S.C., New York City, New York, U.S.	
93	Draw	56–14–23	Eddie Nearing	NWS	10	Jan 24, 1914	19 years, 155 days	Dexter Park Arena, Woodhaven, New York City, New York, U.S.	
92	Draw	56–14–22	Zulu Kid	NWS	10	Dec 19, 1913	19 years, 119 days	East New York A.C., New York City, New York, U.S.	
91	Win	56–14–21	Bull Anderson	NWS	10	Nov 19, 1913	19 years, 89 days	Vanderbilt A.C., New York City, New York, U.S.	
90	Win	55–14–21	Mike Farrell	NWS	10	Nov 7, 1913	19 years, 77 days	East New York A.C., New York City, New York, U.S.	
89	Win	54–14–21	Freddie Kiebler	NWS	10	Nov 1, 1913	19 years, 71 days	Brown's Gym, New York City, New York, U.S.	
88	Draw	53–14–21	Willie K.O. Brennan	NWS	10	Oct 18, 1913	19 years, 57 days	Irving A.C., New York City, New York, U.S.	
87	Win	53–14–20	Noah Brusso	PTS	10	Sep 25, 1913	19 years, 34 days	Atlas A.A., Boston, Massachusetts, U.S.	
86	Win	52–14–20	Johnny Stewart	NWS	6	Sep 9, 1913	19 years, 18 days	Bangor, Maine, U.S.	
85	Win	51–14–20	Bill Fleming	NWS	6	Aug 26, 1913	19 years, 4 days	Bangor, Maine, U.S.	
84	Win	50–14–20	Billy Grupp	NWS	10	Aug 12, 1913	18 years, 355 days	Atlantic Garden A.C., New York City, New York, U.S.	
83	Win	49–14–20	Jakob "Soldier" Bartfield	NWS	10	Aug 11, 1913	18 years, 354 days	Military A.C., New York City, New York, U.S.	
82	Win	48–14–20	Bull Anderson	NWS	10	Aug 9, 1913	18 years, 352 days	Irving A.C., New York City, New York, U.S.	
81	Draw	47–14–20	Mike Farrell	NWS	10	Jul 22, 1913	18 years, 334 days	Atlantic A.A., Rockaway Beach, New York City, New York, U.S.	
80	Win	47–14–19	Billy Sherman	KO	2 (10)	Jun 27, 1913	18 years, 309 days	Brown's Gym A.A., Far Rockaway, New York City, New York, U.S.	
79	Win	46–14–19	Terry Mitchell	NWS	10	Jun 6, 1913	18 years, 288 days	East New York A.C., New York City, New York, U.S.	
78	Draw	45–14–19	Wildcat Ferns	PTS	20	May 28, 1913	18 years, 279 days	Dayton, Ohio, U.S.	
77	Win	45–14–18	Eddie Mack	KO	4 (10)	May 16, 1913	18 years, 267 days	East New York A.C., New York City, New York, U.S.	
76	Loss	44–14–18	Young Ahearn	NWS	10	May 14, 1913	18 years, 265 days	St. Nicholas Arena, New York City, New York, U.S.	
75	Win	44–13–18	Battling Larry Ryan	NWS	10	Apr 29, 1913	18 years, 250 days	Military A.C., New York City, New York, U.S.	
74	Win	43–13–18	Bull Anderson	NWS	10	Mar 7, 1913	18 years, 197 days	East New York A.C., New York City, New York, U.S.	
73	Win	42–13–18	Harry Thiel	NWS	6	Feb 22, 1913	18 years, 184 days	National A.C., New York City, New York, U.S.	
72	Win	41–13–18	Al Thiel	NWS	10	Feb 7, 1913	18 years, 169 days	East New York A.C., New York City, New York, U.S.	
71	Draw	40–13–18	Wildcat Ferns	PTS	15	Jan 22, 1913	18 years, 153 days	Dayton, Ohio, U.S.	
70	Draw	40–13–17	Harry Price	NWS	10	Jan 8, 1913	18 years, 139 days	Royale A.C., New York City, New York, U.S.	
69	Loss	40–13–16	Young McCartney	NWS	6	Jan 1, 1913	18 years, 132 days	National A.C., Philadelphia, Pennsylvania, U.S.	
68	Loss	40–12–16	Joe White	DQ	8 (10)	Dec 25, 1912	18 years, 125 days	Brooklyn Beach A.C., New York City, New York, U.S.	
67	Win	40–11–16	Jack Smith	NWS	10	Dec 6, 1912	18 years, 104 days	East New York A.C., New York City, New York, U.S.	
66	Draw	39–11–16	Gus Christie	PTS	15	Dec 4, 1912	18 years, 104 days	Dayton, Ohio, U.S.	
65	Win	39–11–15	Sailor Jack Howard	KO	10 (10)	Nov 23, 1912	18 years, 93 days	Irving A.C., New York City, New York, U.S.	
64	Win	38–11–15	Young Erne	NWS	6	Nov 9, 1912	18 years, 79 days	National A.C., Philadelphia, Pennsylvania, U.S.	
63	Win	37–11–15	Marty Brown	NWS	10	Nov 2, 1912	18 years, 72 days	National A.C., New York City, New York, U.S.	
62	Draw	36–11–15	Joe Stein	NWS	10	Oct 18, 1912	18 years, 57 days	Madison Square Garden, New York City, New York, U.S.	
61	Win	36–11–14	Johnny Shaw	KO	3 (10)	Oct 16, 1912	18 years, 55 days	Royale A.C., New York City, New York, U.S.	
60	Win	35–11–14	Charley Sieger	KO	3 (10)	Sep 28, 1912	18 years, 37 days	National A.C., New York City, New York, U.S.	
59	Win	34–11–14	Bill Fleming	NWS	6	Sep 10, 1912	18 years, 19 days	Eastport, Maine, U.S.	
58	Draw	33–11–14	Paddy Sullivan	NWS	10	Aug 13, 1912	17 years, 357 days	Atlas A.C., Rockaway Beach, New York City, New York, U.S.	
57	Win	33–11–13	Dave Kurtz	NWS	10	Aug 12, 1912	17 years, 356 days	Madison Square Garden, New York City, New York, U.S.	
56	Win	32–11–13	Mike Farrell	NWS	10	Jul 19, 1912	17 years, 332 days	Atlantic A.A., Rockaway Beach, New York City, New York, U.S.	
55	Draw	31–11–13	Young Hickey	NWS	10	Jul 13, 1912	17 years, 326 days	Fairmont A.C., New York City, New York, U.S.	
54	Win	31–11–12	Battling Jack Nelson	KO	4 (10)	Jul 5, 1912	17 years, 318 days	Atlantic A.A., Rockaway Beach, New York City, New York, U.S.	
53	Win	30–11–12	Joe Kastner	NWS	10	Jun 25, 1912	17 years, 308 days	Jamaica A.C., Jamaica, New York City, New York, U.S.	
52	Loss	29–11–12	Willie Fitzgerald	NWS	10	Jun 15, 1912	17 years, 298 days	Gowanus A.C., New York City, New York, U.S.	
51	Win	29–10–12	Eddie Hanlon	KO	2 (10)	Jun 1, 1912	17 years, 284 days	American A.A., New York City, New York, U.S.	
50	Win	28–10–12	Rudolph Hinz	NWS	10	May 2, 1912	17 years, 254 days	American A.A., New York City, New York, U.S.	
49	Win	27–10–12	Johnny Waltz	KO	2 (10)	Apr 19, 1912	17 years, 241 days	American A.A., New York City, New York, U.S.	
48	Loss	26–10–12	Young Otto	NWS	10	Mar 29, 1912	17 years, 220 days	Queensboro A.C., Long Island City, New York City, New York, U.S.	
47	Win	26–9–12	Terry McGraw	NWS	10	Mar 2, 1912	17 years, 193 days	National A.C., New York City, New York, U.S.	
46	Win	25–9–12	Sailor Eddie Maher	KO	2 (4)	Feb 26, 1912	17 years, 188 days	Irving A.C., New York City, New York, U.S.	
45	Win	24–9–12	Jack Smith	TKO	2 (10)	Feb 10, 1912	17 years, 172 days	National A.C., New York City, New York, U.S.	
44	Loss	23–9–12	Young Joe Grim	NWS	6	Jan 13, 1912	17 years, 144 days	National A.C., New York City, New York, U.S.	
43	Win	23–8–12	Young DeGrand	KO	3 (10)	Jan 6, 1912	17 years, 137 days	National A.C., New York City, New York, U.S.	
42	Win	22–8–12	Jack Beckman	KO	2 (4)	Jan 13, 1912	17 years, 144 days	National A.C., New York City, New York, U.S.	
41	Draw	21–8–12	Henry Hall	NWS	6	Nov 30, 1911	17 years, 100 days	Eastport, Maine, U.S.	
40	Win	21–8–11	Chester Walcott	NWS	6	Nov 20, 1911	17 years, 90 days	Eastport, Maine, U.S.	
39	Win	20–8–11	Jim Smith	KO	1 (6)	Nov 11, 1911	17 years, 81 days	Eastern Parkway A.C., New York City, New York, U.S.	
38	Draw	19–8–11	Johnny Stewart	NWS	6	Oct 23, 1911	17 years, 62 days	Eastport, Maine, U.S.	Exact date unknown
37	Win	19–8–10	George Niedoff	NWS	12	Aug 28, 1911	17 years, 6 days	Eastport, Maine, U.S.	
36	Win	18–8–10	Al King	NWS	6	Aug 11, 1911	16 years, 354 days	Brighton Beach A.C., New York City, New York, U.S.	
35	Win	17–8–10	Jim McGuinness	KO	6 (6)	Aug 9, 1911	16 years, 352 days	Pembroke, Maine, U.S.	
34	Win	16–8–10	Jim McGuinness	KO	1 (6)	Aug 3, 1911	16 years, 346 days	Pembroke, Maine, U.S.	
33	Win	15–8–10	George Niedoff	NWS	6	Jun 20, 1911	16 years, 302 days	Eastport, Maine, U.S.	
32	Draw	14–8–10	Yankee Gilbert	NWS	4	Jun 2, 1911	16 years, 284 days	Atlantic A.A., Rockaway Beach, New York City, New York, U.S.	
31	Draw	14–8–9	Al King	NWS	4	May 20, 1911	16 years, 271 days	National A.C., New York City, New York, U.S.	
30	Loss	14–8–8	Bill Fleming	NWS	6	May 15, 1911	16 years, 266 days	Old Town, Maine, U.S.	
29	Win	14–7–8	Jack Ryan	KO	2 (6)	May 6, 1911	16 years, 257 days	Portland, Maine, U.S.	
28	Draw	13–7–8	Johnny Gallant	NWS	6	Apr 28, 1911	16 years, 249 days	Biddeford, Maine, U.S.	
27	Loss	13–7–7	Mike Farrell	NWS	6	Mar 25, 1911	16 years, 215 days	New York A.C., New York City, New York, U.S.	
26	Draw	13–6–7	Monk Green	NWS	4	Mar 18, 1911	16 years, 208 days	National A.C., New York City, New York, U.S.	
25	Win	13–6–6	Al King	NWS	6	Mar 7, 1911	16 years, 197 days	Brown's Gym, New York City, New York, U.S.	
24	Loss	12–6–6	Al King	NWS	4	Feb 25, 1911	16 years, 187 days	National A.C., New York City, New York, U.S.	
23	Loss	12–5–6	Johnny Glover	NWS	6	Feb 11, 1911	16 years, 173 days	Portland, Maine, U.S.	
22	Draw	12–4–6	Johnny Fraser	NWS	6	Feb 4, 1911	16 years, 166 days	Portland, Maine, U.S.	
21	Draw	12–4–5	Young Hugo Kelly	NWS	6	Jan 21, 1911	16 years, 152 days	Biddeford, Maine, U.S.	
20	Win	12–4–4	Billy Shea	NWS	6	Jan 14, 1911	16 years, 145 days	Portland, Maine, U.S.	
19	Draw	11–4–4	Shadow McCormick	NWS	6	Jan 13, 1911	16 years, 144 days	Auburn, New York, U.S.	
18	Win	11–4–3	Kid Ryan	KO	3 (6)	Jan 7, 1911	16 years, 138 days	Portland, Maine, U.S.	
17	Win	10–4–3	Battling Pete	KO	5 (6)	Dec 27, 1910	16 years, 127 days	Brown's Gym, New York City, New York, U.S.	
16	Draw	9–4–3	Battling Pete	NWS	4	Dec 23, 1910	16 years, 123 days	Eastern Parkway A.C., New York City, New York, U.S.	
15	Loss	9–4–2	Bull Anderson	NWS	6	Dec 9, 1910	16 years, 109 days	Eastern Parkway A.C., New York City, New York, U.S.	
14	Win	9–3–2	Monk Green	NWS	6	Dec 2, 1910	16 years, 102 days	Eastern Parkway A.C., New York City, New York, U.S.	
13	Win	8–3–2	Young Buck	KO	1 (6)	Nov 25, 1910	16 years, 95 days	Eastern Parkway A.C., New York City, New York, U.S.	
12	Win	7–3–2	Jim Warner	KO	3 (4)	Nov 18, 1910	16 years, 88 days	Eastern Parkway A.C., New York City, New York, U.S.	
11	Draw	6–3–2	Terry Brooks	NWS	6	Nov 12, 1910	16 years, 82 days	Eastport, Maine, U.S.	
10	Win	6–3–1	Battling Pete	NWS	6	Nov 11, 1910	16 years, 81 days	Eastern Parkway A.C., New York City, New York, U.S.	
9	Win	5–3–1	Kid Parsons	NWS	6	Nov 8, 1910	16 years, 78 days	Portland, Maine, U.S.	
8	Win	4–3–1	Kid Parsons	NWS	6	Nov 5, 1910	16 years, 75 days	Portland, Maine, U.S.	
7	Win	3–3–1	Jim Rippin	NWS	6	Oct 8, 1910	16 years, 47 days	Portland, Maine, U.S.	
6	Draw	2–3–1	Young Hugo Kelly	NWS	6	Sep 21, 1910	16 years, 30 days	Portland, Maine, U.S.	
5	Win	2–3	Young Hugo Kelly	PTS	6	Sep 10, 1910	16 years, 19 days	Portland, Maine, U.S.	
4	Loss	1–3	Marty O'Brien	KO	3 (6)	Aug 8, 1910	15 years, 351 days	Knickerbocker A.C., Albany, New York, U.S.	
3	Loss	1–2	Chester Walcott	PTS	6	Jul 21, 1910	15 years, 333 days	American A.C., Boston, Massachusetts, U.S.	
2	Win	1–1	Benny Burke	PTS	4	Jun 30, 1910	15 years, 312 days	American A.C., Boston, Massachusetts, U.S.	
1	Loss	0–1	Gus Murphy	PTS	6	Jun 14, 1910	15 years, 296 days	Armory A.A., Boston, Massachusetts, U.S.	

== See also ==
- List of middleweight boxing champions
- List of select Jewish boxers

Achievements
Preceded by George Chip	World Middleweight Champion; April 7, 1914 – November 14, 1917	Succeeded by Mike O'Dowd
