= Leo Florian Hauck =

American boxer (1888–1950)

Leo Houck
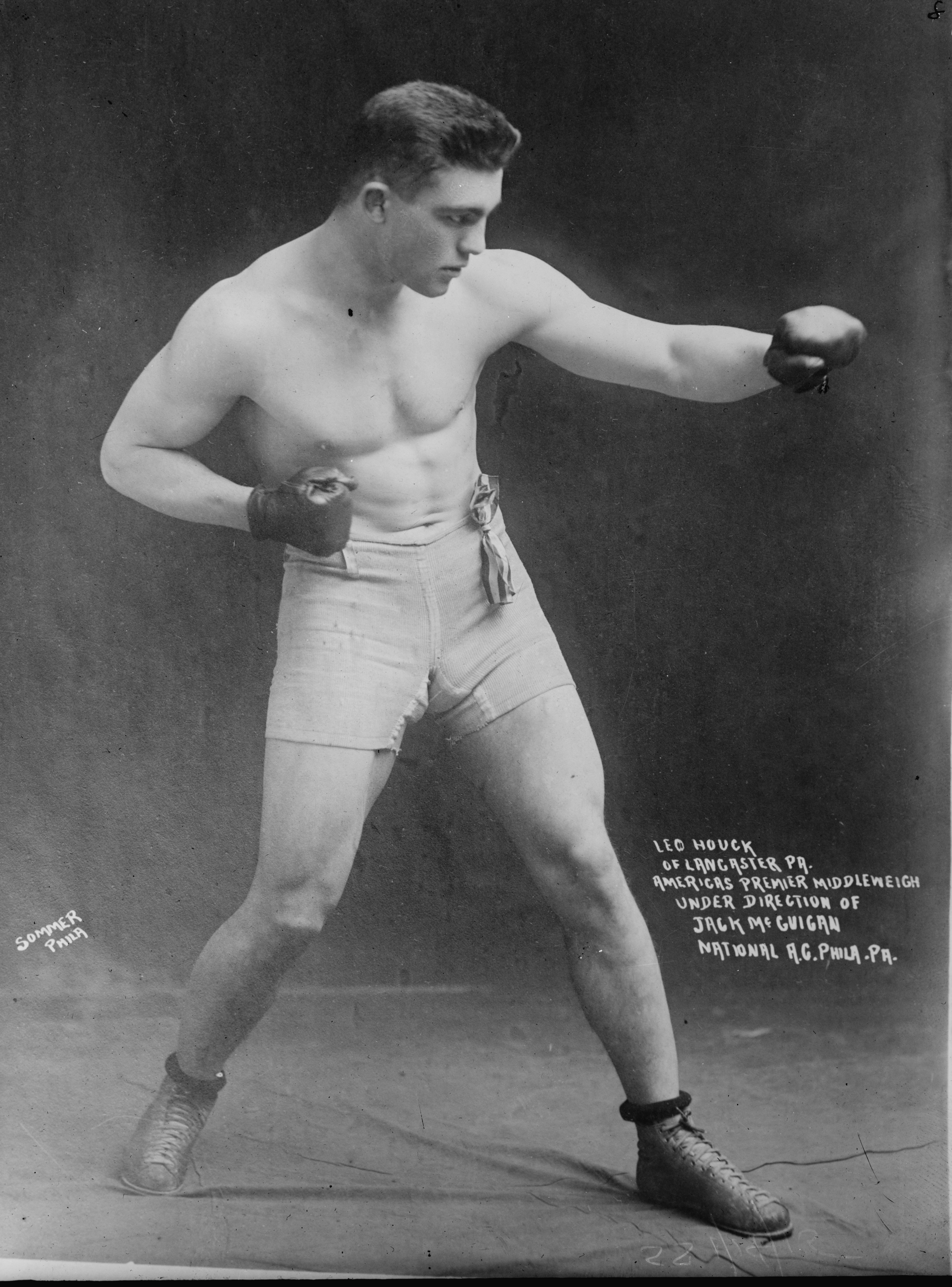

Personal information
- Nickname: Lancaster Thunderbolt
- Born: Leo Florian Hauck; November 4, 1888 Lancaster, Pennsylvania, U.S.
- Died: January 21, 1950 (aged 61)
- Height: 5 ft 8 in (1.73 m)
- Weight: Heavyweight; Light Heavyweight; Middleweight; Welterweight; Featherweight; Flyweight

Boxing career
- Stance: Orthodox

Boxing record
- Total fights: 211;
- Wins: 144
- Win by KO: 21
- Losses: 36
- Draws: 23
- No contests: 5

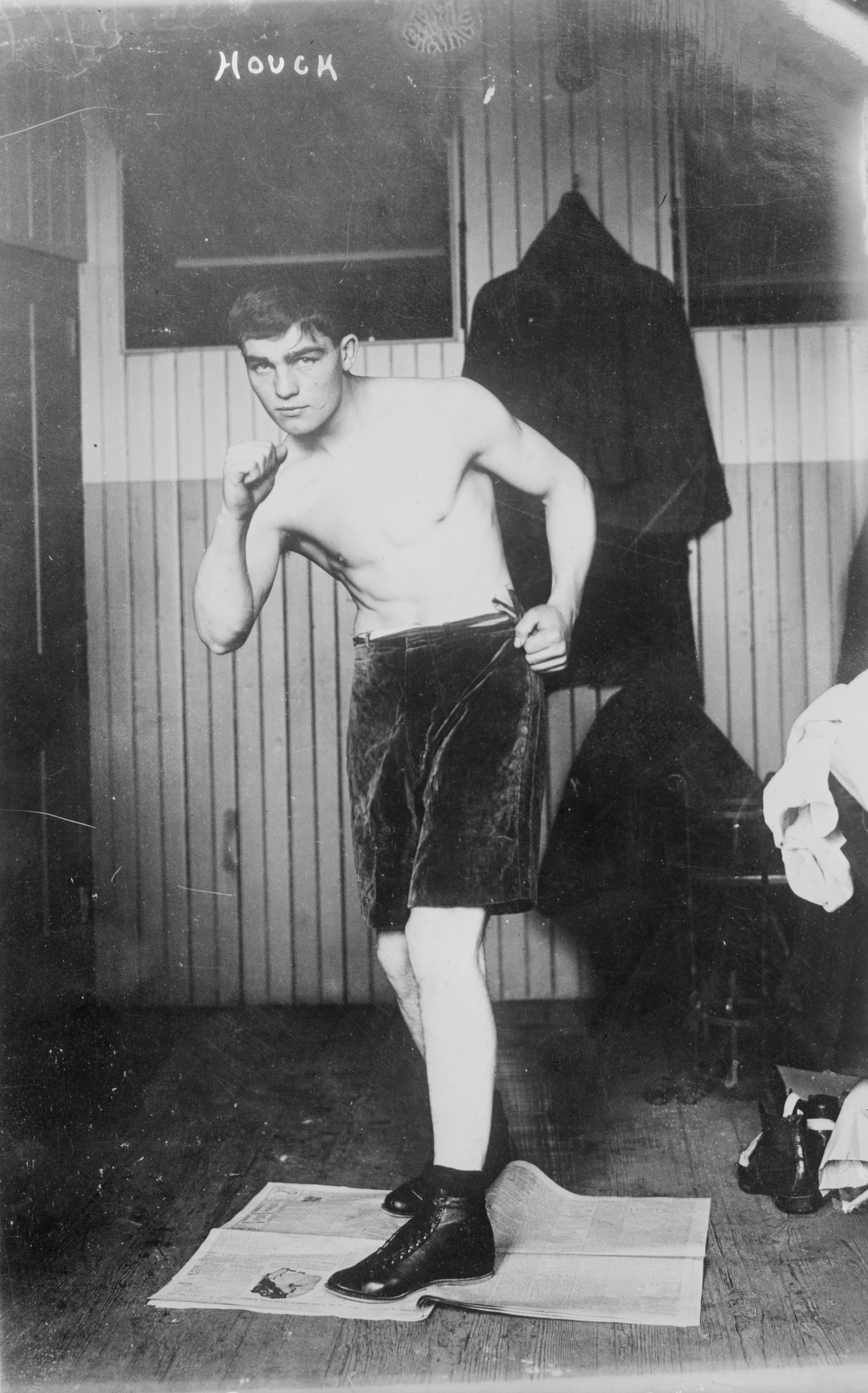
A young Leo Houck

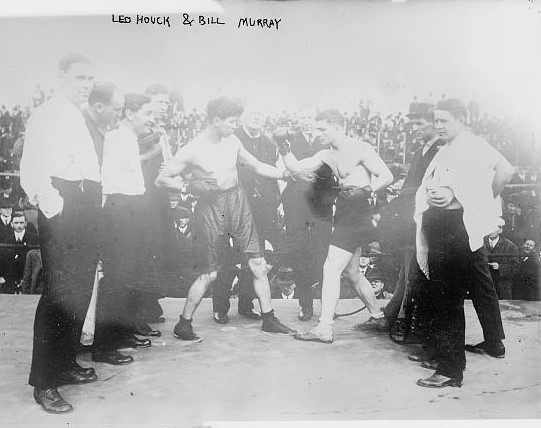
Houck (right) posing before his fight with Billy Murray

Leo Florian Hauck (November 4, 1888 – January 21, 1950) was an American boxer. During his career, he was able to achieve victories over many Hall of Famers including Jack Britton, Jack Dillon, Battling Levinsky, Frank Klaus, Billy Papke, Jeff Smith and Harry Lewis. He also faced the likes of Harry Greb, Gene Tunney and Mike Gibbons. He was inducted into the Ring Magazine hall of fame in 1969, the Pennsylvania Sports Hall of Fame in 1972, and enshrined within the International Boxing Hall of Fame as a part of the 2012 class.

== Biography ==
He was born on November 4, 1888, in Lancaster, Pennsylvania. He began boxing in 1902 as a flyweight, and fought successfully in every weight division up to heavyweight. Houck later served as the boxing coach at Penn State from 1922 to 1949, while also working as a boxing promoter in Lancaster (1931–32). Houck also worked as a referee and judge in the state of Pennsylvania. He died on January 21, 1950.

== Professional boxing record ==
All information in this section is derived from BoxRec, unless otherwise stated.

=== Official record ===
211 fights	33 wins	9 losses
By knockout	21	2
By decision	12	6
By disqualification	0	1
Draws	3	
No contests	1	
Newspaper decisions/draws	165	

All newspaper decisions are officially regarded as "no decision" bouts and are not counted in the win/loss/draw column.

No.	Result	Record	Opponent	Type	Round(s)	Date	Age	Location	Notes
211	Win	33–9–3 (166)	"Sailor" Jack Grady	TKO	3 (8)	Aug 9, 1926	37 years, 278 days	Rossmere Park, Lancaster, Pennsylvania, U.S.	
210	Win	32–9–3 (166)	Buck Aston	NWS	8	May 7, 1923	34 years, 184 days	Fulton Opera House, Lancaster, Pennsylvania, U.S.	
209	Win	32–9–3 (165)	Lew Schupp	NWS	8	Oct 23, 1922	33 years, 353 days	Fulton Opera House, Lancaster, Pennsylvania, U.S.	
208	Draw	32–9–3 (164)	Jackie Clark	NWS	8	Oct 2, 1922	33 years, 332 days	Fulton Opera House, Lancaster, Pennsylvania, U.S.	
207	Win	32–9–3 (163)	Jim Holland	NWS	8	Aug 28, 1922	33 years, 297 days	Rocky Springs Park, Lancaster, Pennsylvania, U.S.	
206	Win	32–9–3 (162)	Frankie Britton	NWS	8	Jul 24, 1922	33 years, 262 days	Rossmere Park, Lancaster, Pennsylvania, U.S.	
205	Win	32–9–3 (161)	Santiago Esparraguera	KO	4 (10)	Jun 17, 1922	33 years, 225 days	Nuevo Fronton, Havana, Cuba	
204	Win	31–9–3 (161)	Kid Cardenas	PTS	10	May 20, 1922	33 years, 197 days	Nuevo Fronton, Havana, Cuba	
203	Win	30–9–3 (161)	Herman Smith	NWS	8	May 1, 1922	33 years, 178 days	Orpheum Theatre, York, Pennsylvania, U.S.	
202	Win	30–9–3 (160)	Lew Schupp	NWS	8	Apr 17, 1922	33 years, 164 days	Fulton Opera House, Lancaster, Pennsylvania, U.S.	
201	Win	30–9–3 (159)	Ray Smith	NWS	8	Mar 13, 1922	33 years, 129 days	Fulton Opera House, Lancaster, Pennsylvania, U.S.	
200	Loss	30–9–3 (158)	Dan O'Dowd	NWS	8	May 21, 1921	32 years, 198 days	Atlantic City, New Jersey, U.S.	
199	Loss	30–9–3 (157)	Gene Tunney	NWS	10	Dec 7, 1920	32 years, 33 days	Regiment Armory, Jersey City, New Jersey, U.S.	
198	Draw	30–9–3 (156)	Leo Leonard	NWS	10	Nov 29, 1920	32 years, 25 days	Williamsport, Pennsylvania, U.S.	
197	Loss	30–9–3 (155)	Gene Tunney	NWS	6	Nov 25, 1920	32 years, 21 days	Olympia A.C., Philadelphia, Pennsylvania, U.S.	
196	Win	30–9–3 (154)	K.O. Sullivan	NWS	10	Nov 12, 1920	32 years, 8 days	Third Regiment Armory, Camden, New Jersey, U.S.	
195	Draw	30–9–3 (153)	Fay Keiser	PTS	10	Oct 23, 1920	31 years, 354 days	Roller Rink, Cumberland, Maryland, U.S.	
194	Win	30–9–2 (153)	Frankie Farron	NWS	6	Oct 22, 1920	31 years, 353 days	Rocky Springs Park, Lancaster, Pennsylvania, U.S.	
193	Win	30–9–2 (152)	Herman Miller	NWS	10	Jun 22, 1920	31 years, 231 days	Norfolk, Virginia, U.S.	
192	Win	30–9–2 (151)	K.O. Sullivan	NWS	10	May 31, 1920	31 years, 209 days	Railway Park, Pottsville, Pennsylvania, U.S.	
191	Loss	30–9–2 (150)	George K.O. Samson	NWS	6	May 14, 1920	31 years, 192 days	Opera House, Columbia, Pennsylvania, U.S.	
190	Win	30–9–2 (149)	Rudolph Martine	TKO	6 (6)	May 10, 1920	31 years, 188 days	Fulton Opera House, Lancaster, Pennsylvania, U.S.	
189	Win	29–9–2 (149)	Johnny Howard	NWS	8	Mar 16, 1920	31 years, 133 days	Schuetzen Park, Bayonne, New Jersey, U.S.	
188	Win	29–9–2 (148)	George K.O. Samson	NWS	6	Mar 11, 1920	31 years, 128 days	Germantown A.C., Philadelphia, Pennsylvania, U.S.	
187	Loss	29–9–2 (147)	Jackie Clark	NWS	6	Mar 8, 1920	31 years, 125 days	Fulton Opera House, Lancaster, Pennsylvania, U.S.	
186	Loss	29–9–2 (146)	Roddie MacDonald	PTS	15	Feb 3, 1920	31 years, 91 days	Armouries, Halifax, Nova Scotia, Canada	
185	Win	29–8–2 (146)	Eddie Revoire	NWS	6	Jan 21, 1920	31 years, 78 days	Olympia A.C., Philadelphia, Pennsylvania, U.S.	
184	Win	29–8–2 (145)	George K.O. Samson	NWS	6	Jan 10, 1920	31 years, 67 days	National A.C., Philadelphia, Pennsylvania, U.S.	
183	Win	29–8–2 (144)	Bert Kenny	NWS	4	Dec 15, 1919	31 years, 41 days	Manor Street Theatre, Lancaster, Pennsylvania, U.S.	
182	Win	29–8–2 (143)	Harry Applegate	KO	2 (?)	Dec 12, 1919	31 years, 38 days	York A.C., York, Pennsylvania, U.S.	
181	Win	28–8–2 (143)	George K.O. Samson	NWS	6	Nov 24, 1919	31 years, 20 days	Maple Grove, Lancaster, Pennsylvania, U.S.	
180	Win	28–8–2 (142)	George K.O. Samson	NWS	6	Oct 6, 1919	30 years, 336 days	Frank Erne Club, Lancaster, Pennsylvania, U.S.	
179	Win	28–8–2 (141)	Bert Kenny	NWS	8	Sep 11, 1919	30 years, 311 days	Atlantic City, New Jersey, U.S.	
178	Win	28–8–2 (140)	Larry Williams	NWS	6	Apr 28, 1919	30 years, 175 days	Frank Erne Club, Lancaster, Pennsylvania, U.S.	
177	Loss	28–8–2 (139)	Harry Greb	NWS	10	Apr 25, 1919	30 years, 172 days	Carney Auditorium, Erie, Pennsylvania, U.S.	
176	Loss	28–8–2 (138)	Joe Allison	NWS	8	Apr 4, 1919	30 years, 151 days	Penns Grove, New Jersey, U.S.	
175	Win	28–8–2 (137)	Al Thiel	NWS	6	Mar 31, 1919	30 years, 147 days	Frank Erne Club, Lancaster, Pennsylvania, U.S.	
174	Loss	28–8–2 (136)	Larry Williams	NWS	6	Mar 28, 1919	30 years, 144 days	Orpheum Theater, Harrisburg, Pennsylvania, U.S.	
173	Loss	28–8–2 (135)	Mike Gibbons	NWS	8	Mar 25, 1919	30 years, 141 days	Coliseum, Saint Louis, Missouri, U.S.	
172	Win	28–8–2 (134)	Jack Clifford	NWS	6	Mar 14, 1919	30 years, 130 days	Cambria A.C., Philadelphia, Pennsylvania, U.S.	
171	Loss	28–8–2 (133)	Harry Greb	NWS	6	Mar 6, 1919	30 years, 122 days	Fulton Opera House, Lancaster, Pennsylvania, U.S.	
170	Win	28–8–2 (132)	Zulu Kid	NWS	6	Feb 24, 1919	30 years, 112 days	Manor Street Theatre, Lancaster, Pennsylvania, U.S.	Not to be confused with Young Zulu Kid
169	Draw	28–8–2 (131)	Roddie MacDonald	PTS	15	Feb 20, 1919	30 years, 108 days	Halifax, Nova Scotia, Canada	
168	Win	28–8–1 (131)	Bob Grant	KO	1 (6), 1:00	Feb 3, 1919	30 years, 91 days	Frank Erne Club, Lancaster, Pennsylvania, U.S.	
167	Win	27–8–1 (131)	Battling Kopin	KO	3 (6)	Jan 20, 1919	30 years, 77 days	Frank Erne Club, Lancaster, Pennsylvania, U.S.	
166	Loss	26–8–1 (131)	Harry Greb	PTS	12	Jan 14, 1919	30 years, 71 days	Arena, Boston, Massachusetts, U.S.	
165	Loss	26–7–1 (131)	Battling Levinsky	NWS	6	Dec 25, 1918	30 years, 51 days	Frank Erne Club, Lancaster, Pennsylvania, U.S.	
164	Win	26–7–1 (130)	Pete Malone	PTS	4	Jul 30, 1918	29 years, 268 days	Chester, Pennsylvania, U.S.	
163	Draw	25–7–1 (130)	Jeff Smith	NWS	6	Jul 4, 1918	29 years, 242 days	Erne's Open Air Arena, Lancaster, Pennsylvania, U.S.	
162	Win	25–7–1 (129)	Edward "Gunboat" Smith	NWS	6	May 27, 1918	29 years, 204 days	Frank Erne Club, Lancaster, Pennsylvania, U.S.	
161	Win	25–7–1 (128)	Clay Turner	NWS	6	Apr 23, 1918	29 years, 170 days	Frank Erne Club, Lancaster, Pennsylvania, U.S.	
160	Loss	25–7–1 (127)	Johnny Wilson	PTS	12	Apr 15, 1918	29 years, 162 days	Douglas A.C., Chelsea, Massachusetts, U.S.	
159	Win	25–6–1 (127)	Johnny Wilson	PTS	12	Mar 11, 1918	29 years, 127 days	Douglas A.C., Chelsea, Massachusetts, U.S.	
158	Win	24–6–1 (127)	Chuck Wiggins	NWS	6	Mar 4, 1918	29 years, 120 days	Lancaster, Pennsylvania, U.S.	
157	Loss	24–6–1 (126)	Jack McCarron	NWS	6	Feb 22, 1918	29 years, 110 days	Cambria A.C., Philadelphia, Pennsylvania, U.S.	
156	Win	24–6–1 (125)	Chuck Wiggins	NWS	6	Jan 1, 1918	29 years, 58 days	National A.C., Philadelphia, Pennsylvania, U.S.	
155	Win	24–6–1 (124)	George Ashe	NWS	6	Dec 25, 1917	29 years, 51 days	Frank Erne Club, Lancaster, Pennsylvania, U.S.	
154	Win	24–6–1 (123)	K.O. Willie Loughlin	NWS	6	Dec 10, 1917	29 years, 36 days	Frank Erne Club, Lancaster, Pennsylvania, U.S.	
153	Win	24–6–1 (122)	Buck Crouse	NWS	6	Nov 19, 1917	29 years, 15 days	Lancaster, Pennsylvania, U.S.	
152	Win	24–6–1 (121)	Willie Meehan	NWS	6	Oct 26, 1917	28 years, 356 days	Cambria A.C., Philadelphia, Pennsylvania, U.S.	
151	Win	24–6–1 (120)	Jack McCarron	NWS	6	Oct 22, 1917	28 years, 352 days	Frank Erne Club, Lancaster, Pennsylvania, U.S.	
150	Win	24–6–1 (119)	Herman Miller	NWS	6	Sep 18, 1917	28 years, 318 days	York, Pennsylvania, U.S.	
149	Win	24–6–1 (118)	See Saw Kelly	KO	3 (6)	May 22, 1917	28 years, 199 days	Manor Street Theatre, Lancaster, Pennsylvania, U.S.	
148	Loss	23–6–1 (118)	Battling Levinsky	NWS	6	May 16, 1917	28 years, 193 days	York Opera House, York, Pennsylvania, U.S.	
147	Win	23–6–1 (117)	Jackie Clark	NWS	6	May 7, 1917	28 years, 184 days	Lancaster, Pennsylvania, U.S.	
146	Win	23–6–1 (116)	Tommy Burke	NWS	6	Apr 16, 1917	28 years, 163 days	Fulton Opera House, Lancaster, Pennsylvania, U.S.	
145	Win	23–6–1 (115)	Dummy Ketchell	NWS	6	Mar 20, 1917	28 years, 136 days	Eighth Ward Theatre, Lancaster, Pennsylvania, U.S.	
144	Win	23–6–1 (114)	Eddie Revoire	NWS	6	Jan 22, 1917	28 years, 79 days	Frank Erne Club, Lancaster, Pennsylvania, U.S.	
143	Win	23–6–1 (113)	Fay Keiser	PTS	10	Dec 27, 1916	28 years, 53 days	Cumberland, Maryland, U.S.	
142	Draw	22–6–1 (113)	Al Grayber	NWS	6	Dec 9, 1916	28 years, 35 days	Power Auditorium, Pittsburgh, Pennsylvania, U.S.	
141	Win	22–6–1 (112)	Jack Reck	NWS	6	May 15, 1916	27 years, 193 days	Family Theatre, Lancaster, Pennsylvania, U.S.	
140	Win	22–6–1 (111)	Ralph Erne	NWS	6	Apr 25, 1916	27 years, 173 days	Coliseum Hall, York, Pennsylvania, U.S.	
139	Win	22–6–1 (110)	Herman Miller	PTS	6	Apr 7, 1916	27 years, 155 days	York, Pennsylvania, U.S.	
138	Win	21–6–1 (110)	Jack Reck	NWS	6	Mar 29, 1916	27 years, 146 days	Keystone AC, Harrisburg, Pennsylvania, U.S.	
137	Win	21–6–1 (109)	K.O. Sullivan	NWS	6	Mar 13, 1916	27 years, 130 days	Lancaster, Pennsylvania, U.S.	
136	Loss	21–6–1 (108)	Eddie Revoire	NWS	6	Mar 7, 1916	27 years, 124 days	Auditorium, Reading, Pennsylvania, U.S.	
135	Win	21–6–1 (107)	Battling Brandt	NWS	6	Feb 29, 1916	27 years, 117 days	York, Pennsylvania, U.S.	
134	Win	21–6–1 (106)	Billy Berger	NWS	6	Feb 14, 1916	27 years, 102 days	Lancaster A.C., Lancaster, Pennsylvania, U.S.	
133	Win	21–6–1 (105)	Willie Baker	NWS	6	Nov 22, 1915	27 years, 18 days	Olympia A.C., Philadelphia, Pennsylvania, U.S.	
132	Loss	21–6–1 (104)	Charles "Sailor" Grande	NWS	6	Nov 16, 1915	27 years, 12 days	Douglas A.C., Philadelphia, Pennsylvania, U.S.	
131	Win	21–6–1 (103)	Al Rogers	NWS	6	Nov 15, 1915	27 years, 11 days	Frohsinn Hall, Altoona, Pennsylvania, U.S.	
130	Draw	21–6–1 (102)	Bill Fleming	NWS	3	Nov 11, 1915	27 years, 7 days	Falcon Hall, Meriden, Connecticut, U.S.	
129	Win	21–6–1 (101)	Johnny Howard	NWS	6	Sep 30, 1915	26 years, 330 days	Rocky Springs Park, Lancaster, Pennsylvania, U.S.	
128	Win	21–6–1 (100)	Herman Miller	TKO	6 (10)	Sep 14, 1915	26 years, 314 days	Conestoga Park, Lancaster, Pennsylvania, U.S.	
127	Win	20–6–1 (100)	Bert Kenny	NWS	10	Sep 10, 1915	26 years, 310 days	New Polo A.C., New York City, New York, U.S.	
126	Draw	20–6–1 (99)	Charles "Sailor" Grande	NWS	6	Jul 26, 1915	26 years, 264 days	Lancaster, Pennsylvania, U.S.	
125	Loss	20–6–1 (98)	Young Ahearn	NWS	10	Jun 7, 1915	26 years, 215 days	Capitol District A.C., Albany, New York, U.S.	
124	Loss	20–6–1 (97)	Mike Gibbons	NWS	10	May 26, 1915	26 years, 203 days	St. Nicholas Arena, New York City, New York, U.S.	
123	Win	20–6–1 (96)	Frank Mantell	PTS	12	May 19, 1915	26 years, 196 days	Rhode Island A.C., Providence, Rhode Island, U.S.	
122	Loss	19–6–1 (96)	Young Ahearn	NWS	10	Apr 22, 1915	26 years, 169 days	Irving A.C., New York City, New York, U.S.	
121	Win	19–6–1 (95)	George K.O. Brown	PTS	10	Apr 8, 1915	26 years, 155 days	Bijou Theater, Atlanta, Georgia, U.S.	
120	Win	18–6–1 (95)	Al Grayber	NWS	10	Mar 30, 1915	26 years, 146 days	Fairmont A.C., Philadelphia, Pennsylvania, U.S.	
119	Win	18–6–1 (94)	George Ashe	NWS	10	Mar 27, 1915	26 years, 143 days	Irving A.C., New York City, New York, U.S.	
118	Win	18–6–1 (93)	Jack Toland	KO	3 (?)	Mar 22, 1915	26 years, 138 days	Lancaster, Pennsylvania, U.S.	
117	Win	17–6–1 (93)	Emmett "Kid" Wagner	NWS	6	Nov 16, 1914	26 years, 12 days	Prince Street Hall, Lancaster, Pennsylvania, U.S.	
116	Loss	17–6–1 (92)	Young Ahearn	NWS	6	Nov 14, 1914	26 years, 10 days	National A.C., Philadelphia, Pennsylvania, U.S.	
115	Win	17–6–1 (91)	Tommy Gavigan	TKO	11 (12)	Sep 7, 1914	25 years, 307 days	Wright Field, Youngstown, Ohio, U.S.	
114	Win	16–6–1 (91)	George Chip	NWS	12	Apr 21, 1914	25 years, 168 days	Grand Opera House, Youngstown, Ohio, U.S.	
113	Loss	16–6–1 (90)	Billy Murray	TKO	14 (20)	Feb 23, 1914	25 years, 111 days	Coffroth's Arena, Daly City, California, U.S.	
112	Loss	16–5–1 (90)	Joe Borrell	NWS	6	Jan 17, 1914	25 years, 74 days	National A.C., Philadelphia, Pennsylvania, U.S.	
111	Win	16–5–1 (89)	Joe Borrell	NWS	6	Dec 20, 1913	25 years, 46 days	National A.C., Philadelphia, Pennsylvania, U.S.	
110	Win	16–5–1 (88)	George Chip	NWS	6	Nov 15, 1913	25 years, 11 days	National A.C., Philadelphia, Pennsylvania, U.S.	NYSAC middleweight title at stake; (via KO only)
109	Win	16–5–1 (87)	Jack Dillon	NWS	6	Oct 9, 1913	24 years, 339 days	Rocky Springs Park, Lancaster, Pennsylvania, U.S.	
108	Win	16–5–1 (86)	Tommy Bergin	NWS	6	Sep 6, 1913	24 years, 306 days	National A.C., Philadelphia, Pennsylvania, U.S.	
107	Win	16–5–1 (85)	Buck Crouse	NWS	6	May 29, 1913	24 years, 206 days	Prince Street Hall, Lancaster, Pennsylvania, U.S.	
106	Win	16–5–1 (84)	George K.O. Brown	NWS	10	May 7, 1913	24 years, 184 days	St. Nicholas Arena, New York City, New York, U.S.	
105	Win	16–5–1 (83)	Richard Gilbert	NWS	6	Mar 27, 1913	24 years, 143 days	Lancaster A.C., Lancaster, Pennsylvania, U.S.	
104	Draw	16–5–1 (82)	Al Rogers	NWS	6	Feb 10, 1913	24 years, 98 days	Mishler Theatre, Altoona, Pennsylvania, U.S.	
103	Loss	16–5–1 (81)	Jack Dillon	NWS	6	Jan 22, 1913	24 years, 79 days	Olympia A.C., Philadelphia, Pennsylvania, U.S.	
102	Win	16–5–1 (80)	Freddie Hicks	NWS	6	Jan 15, 1913	24 years, 72 days	Prince Street Hall, Lancaster, Pennsylvania, U.S.	
101	Draw	16–5–1 (79)	Emmett "Kid" Wagner	NWS	6	Nov 25, 1912	24 years, 21 days	Town Hall, Scranton, Pennsylvania, U.S.	
100	Win	16–5–1 (78)	Larry Williams	KO	4 (6)	Nov 15, 1912	24 years, 11 days	Lancaster, Pennsylvania, U.S.	
99	Win	15–5–1 (78)	Dave Smith	NWS	6	Nov 8, 1912	24 years, 4 days	Olympia A.C., Philadelphia, Pennsylvania, U.S.	
98	Win	15–5–1 (77)	Jack Fitzgerald	NWS	6	Oct 28, 1912	23 years, 359 days	Scranton, Pennsylvania, U.S.	
97	Win	15–5–1 (76)	Eddie McGoorty	NWS	6	Oct 9, 1912	23 years, 340 days	National A.C., Philadelphia, Pennsylvania, U.S.	
96	Win	15–5–1 (75)	Billy Papke	NWS	6	Sep 27, 1912	23 years, 328 days	Olympia A.C., Philadelphia, Pennsylvania, U.S.	
95	Win	15–5–1 (74)	Peck Miller	NWS	6	Sep 19, 1912	23 years, 320 days	Prince Street Hall, Lancaster, Pennsylvania, U.S.	
94	Win	15–5–1 (73)	George Chip	NWS	6	Jun 13, 1912	23 years, 222 days	Rossmere Park, Lancaster, Pennsylvania, U.S.	
93	Win	15–5–1 (72)	Jack Fitzgerald	NWS	6	May 23, 1912	23 years, 201 days	Lancaster, Pennsylvania, U.S.	
92	Loss	15–5–1 (71)	Buck Crouse	PTS	12	May 7, 1912	23 years, 185 days	Pilgrim A.A., Boston, Massachusetts, U.S.	
91	Win	15–4–1 (71)	Peck Miller	NWS	6	Apr 23, 1912	23 years, 171 days	Prince Street Hall, Lancaster, Pennsylvania, U.S.	
90	Win	15–4–1 (70)	Bob Moha	NWS	6	Apr 20, 1912	23 years, 168 days	National A.C., Philadelphia, Pennsylvania, U.S.	
89	Win	15–4–1 (69)	Peck Miller	NWS	6	Apr 12, 1912	23 years, 160 days	Lancaster, Pennsylvania, U.S.	
88	Loss	15–4–1 (68)	Jack Dillon	TKO	6 (10)	Jan 1, 1912	23 years, 58 days	Auditorium (Virginia Ave.), Indianapolis, Indiana, U.S.	Lost world middleweight title claim
87	Draw	15–3–1 (68)	Buck Crouse	NWS	6	Dec 9, 1911	23 years, 35 days	Duquesne Garden, Pittsburgh, Pennsylvania, U.S.	
86	Loss	15–3–1 (67)	Buck Crouse	NWS	6	Nov 15, 1911	23 years, 11 days	Duquesne Garden, Pittsburgh, Pennsylvania, U.S.	
85	Draw	15–3–1 (66)	Harry Ramsey	NWS	6	Nov 3, 1911	22 years, 364 days	Nonpareil A.C., Philadelphia, Pennsylvania, U.S.	
84	Win	15–3–1 (65)	Battling Levinsky	PTS	12	Oct 24, 1911	22 years, 354 days	Arena (Armory A.A.), Boston, Massachusetts, U.S.	
83	Loss	14–3–1 (65)	Frank Klaus	NWS	6	Oct 18, 1911	22 years, 348 days	American A.C., Philadelphia, Pennsylvania, U.S.	
82	Win	14–3–1 (64)	Harry Ramsey	NWS	6	Sep 28, 1911	22 years, 328 days	Lancaster A.C., Lancaster, Pennsylvania, U.S.	
81	Win	14–3–1 (63)	Frank Mantell	NWS	10	Sep 21, 1911	22 years, 321 days	National S.C., New York City, New York, U.S.	
80	Win	14–3–1 (62)	George Chip	NWS	6	Sep 16, 1911	22 years, 316 days	National A.C., Philadelphia, Pennsylvania, U.S.	
79	Win	14–3–1 (61)	Joe Thomas	NWS	6	Jun 16, 1911	22 years, 224 days	Lancaster, Pennsylvania, U.S.	
78	Win	14–3–1 (60)	Harry Lewis	PTS	20	May 3, 1911	22 years, 180 days	L'Hippodrome, Clichy, Paris, France	Won world middleweight title claim
77	Win	13–3–1 (60)	Battling Levinsky	NWS	6	Mar 16, 1911	22 years, 132 days	Lancaster, Pennsylvania, U.S.	
76	Win	13–3–1 (59)	Harry Ramsey	NWS	6	Mar 13, 1911	22 years, 129 days	American A.C., Philadelphia, Pennsylvania, U.S.	
75	Win	13–3–1 (58)	Harry Mansfield	NWS	6	Feb 23, 1911	22 years, 111 days	Lancaster A.C., Lancaster, Pennsylvania, U.S.	
74	Loss	13–3–1 (57)	Frank Klaus	PTS	12	Feb 14, 1911	22 years, 102 days	Armory A.A., Boston, Massachusetts, U.S.	
73	Win	13–2–1 (57)	Tom McMahon	NWS	6	Feb 4, 1911	22 years, 92 days	National A.C., Philadelphia, Pennsylvania, U.S.	
72	Win	13–2–1 (56)	Battling Levinsky	NWS	6	Feb 2, 1911	22 years, 90 days	Lancaster, Pennsylvania, U.S.	
71	Win	13–2–1 (55)	Frank Mantell	PTS	15	Nov 11, 1910	22 years, 7 days	Rhode Island A.C., Thornton, New Jersey, U.S.	
70	Win	12–2–1 (55)	Frank Klaus	NWS	6	Oct 29, 1910	21 years, 359 days	National A.C., Philadelphia, Pennsylvania, U.S.	
69	Win	12–2–1 (54)	Fred Corbett	TKO	3 (6)	Oct 27, 1910	21 years, 357 days	Lancaster A.C., Lancaster, Pennsylvania, U.S.	
68	Win	11–2–1 (54)	Jimmy Gardner	NWS	6	Oct 17, 1910	21 years, 347 days	National A.C., Philadelphia, Pennsylvania, U.S.	
67	Win	11–2–1 (53)	Tommy Quill	KO	8 (12)	Oct 11, 1910	21 years, 341 days	Armory A.A., Boston, Massachusetts, U.S.	
66	Win	10–2–1 (53)	Young Loughrey	NWS	6	Oct 7, 1910	21 years, 337 days	Nonpareil A.C., Philadelphia, Pennsylvania, U.S.	
65	Win	10–2–1 (52)	Young Otto	NWS	6	Oct 1, 1910	21 years, 331 days	National A.C., Philadelphia, Pennsylvania, U.S.	
64	Win	10–2–1 (51)	Jimmy Dolan	TKO	4 (6)	Sep 28, 1910	21 years, 328 days	Lancaster A.C., Lancaster, Pennsylvania, U.S.	
63	Win	9–2–1 (51)	Harry Lewis	NWS	6	Sep 17, 1910	21 years, 317 days	National A.C., Philadelphia, Pennsylvania, U.S.	
62	Win	9–2–1 (50)	Harry Lewis	PTS	12	Aug 23, 1910	21 years, 292 days	Armory, Boston, Massachusetts, U.S.	
61	Win	8–2–1 (50)	Young Loughrey	NWS	6	Jun 23, 1910	21 years, 231 days	Lancaster A.C., Lancaster, Pennsylvania, U.S.	
60	Win	8–2–1 (49)	Joe Hirst	NWS	6	Jun 16, 1910	21 years, 224 days	Lancaster A.C., Lancaster, Pennsylvania, U.S.	
59	Loss	8–2–1 (48)	Young Loughrey	PTS	15	May 4, 1910	21 years, 181 days	Wilmington, Delaware, U.S.	
58	Win	8–1–1 (48)	Johnny Willetts	NWS	6	Apr 30, 1910	21 years, 177 days	National A.C., Philadelphia, Pennsylvania, U.S.	
57	Loss	8–1–1 (47)	Frank Perron	DQ	2 (12)	Apr 26, 1910	21 years, 173 days	Armory, Boston, Massachusetts, U.S.	
56	Draw	8–0–1 (47)	Dick Nelson	PTS	12	Apr 21, 1910	21 years, 168 days	New Haven, Connecticut, U.S.	
55	Win	8–0 (47)	Young Erne	NWS	6	Apr 15, 1910	21 years, 162 days	Douglas A.C., Philadelphia, Pennsylvania, U.S.	
54	Draw	8–0 (46)	Young Loughrey	NWS	10	Apr 7, 1910	21 years, 154 days	Academy Hall, Reading, Pennsylvania, U.S.	
53	Win	8–0 (45)	Young Erne	NWS	6	Mar 31, 1910	21 years, 147 days	Lancaster A.C., Lancaster, Pennsylvania, U.S.	
52	Win	8–0 (44)	Joe Hirst	NWS	6	Mar 17, 1910	21 years, 133 days	Lancaster A.C., Lancaster, Pennsylvania, U.S.	
51	Win	8–0 (43)	Young Loughrey	NWS	6	Mar 15, 1910	21 years, 131 days	Douglas A.C., Philadelphia, Pennsylvania, U.S.	
50	Win	8–0 (42)	Jack Cardiff	NWS	10	Mar 9, 1910	21 years, 125 days	Academy Hall, Reading, Pennsylvania, U.S.	
49	Win	8–0 (41)	Young Nitchie	NWS	6	Mar 3, 1910	21 years, 119 days	Lancaster A.C., Lancaster, Pennsylvania, U.S.	
48	Loss	8–0 (40)	Paddy Lavin	NWS	10	Feb 16, 1910	21 years, 104 days	Academy Hall, Reading, Pennsylvania, U.S.	
47	Draw	8–0 (39)	Young Erne	NWS	6	Feb 12, 1910	21 years, 100 days	National A.C., Philadelphia, Pennsylvania, U.S.	
46	Win	8–0 (38)	Tommy O'Keefe	NWS	6	Feb 10, 1910	21 years, 98 days	Lancaster A.C., Lancaster, Pennsylvania, U.S.	
45	Win	8–0 (37)	Mickey Gannon	NWS	6	Jan 29, 1910	21 years, 86 days	National A.C., Philadelphia, Pennsylvania, U.S.	
44	Loss	8–0 (36)	Joe Hirst	NWS	6	Jan 20, 1910	21 years, 77 days	Lancaster A.C., Lancaster, Pennsylvania, U.S.	
43	Win	8–0 (35)	Young Nitchie	NWS	10	Dec 20, 1909	21 years, 46 days	Academy Hall, Reading, Pennsylvania, U.S.	
42	Win	8–0 (34)	Kid Locke	NWS	6	Dec 16, 1909	21 years, 42 days	Lancaster A.C., Lancaster, Pennsylvania, U.S.	
41	Win	8–0 (33)	Young Kid Broad	NWS	6	Dec 2, 1909	21 years, 28 days	Lancaster A.C., Lancaster, Pennsylvania, U.S.	
40	Loss	8–0 (32)	Joe Hirst	NWS	6	Nov 25, 1909	21 years, 21 days	Lancaster A.C., Lancaster, Pennsylvania, U.S.	
39	Draw	8–0 (31)	Joe Sieger	NWS	6	Nov 11, 1909	21 years, 7 days	Lancaster A.C., Lancaster, Pennsylvania, U.S.	
38	Win	8–0 (30)	Mike Fleming	NWS	6	Oct 14, 1909	20 years, 344 days	Lancaster A.C., Lancaster, Pennsylvania, U.S.	
37	Win	8–0 (29)	Tommy O'Keefe	NWS	6	May 14, 1909	20 years, 191 days	Lancaster A.C., Lancaster, Pennsylvania, U.S.	
36	Draw	8–0 (28)	Grover Hayes	NWS	6	Mar 27, 1909	20 years, 143 days	National A.C., Philadelphia, Pennsylvania, U.S.	
35	Draw	8–0 (27)	Jack Britton	NWS	6	Mar 18, 1909	20 years, 134 days	Lancaster A.C., Lancaster, Pennsylvania, U.S.	
34	Win	8–0 (26)	Young Kid Broad	NWS	6	Mar 4, 1909	20 years, 120 days	Lancaster A.C., Lancaster, Pennsylvania, U.S.	
33	Win	8–0 (25)	Grover Hayes	NWS	6	Feb 23, 1909	20 years, 111 days	Chestnut Street Auditorium, Harrisburg, Pennsylvania, U.S.	
32	Draw	8–0 (24)	Kid Locke	NWS	6	Feb 18, 1909	20 years, 106 days	National A.C., Philadelphia, Pennsylvania, U.S.	
31	Draw	8–0 (23)	Jack Britton	NWS	6	Feb 4, 1909	20 years, 92 days	National A.C., Philadelphia, Pennsylvania, U.S.	
30	Loss	8–0 (22)	Eddie McAvoy	NWS	6	Jan 14, 1909	20 years, 71 days	National A.C., Philadelphia, Pennsylvania, U.S.	
29	Win	8–0 (21)	Phil Griffin	NWS	6	Dec 17, 1908	20 years, 43 days	National A.C., Philadelphia, Pennsylvania, U.S.	
28	Draw	8–0 (20)	George Decker	NWS	6	Nov 19, 1908	20 years, 15 days	National A.C., Philadelphia, Pennsylvania, U.S.	
27	Win	8–0 (19)	Harry Kegel	TKO	2 (6)	Oct 15, 1908	19 years, 346 days	National A.C., Philadelphia, Pennsylvania, U.S.	
26	Loss	7–0 (19)	Phil Griffin	NWS	6	Apr 25, 1908	19 years, 173 days	National A.C., Philadelphia, Pennsylvania, U.S.	
25	Draw	7–0 (18)	Willie Lucas	NWS	6	Apr 16, 1908	19 years, 164 days	Lancaster A.C., Lancaster, Pennsylvania, U.S.	
24	Loss	7–0 (17)	Percy Cove	NWS	6	Mar 19, 1908	19 years, 136 days	Lancaster A.C., Lancaster, Pennsylvania, U.S.	
23	Loss	7–0 (16)	Tommy O'Keefe	NWS	6	Feb 20, 1908	19 years, 108 days	Lancaster A.C., Lancaster, Pennsylvania, U.S.	
22	Win	7–0 (15)	Kid Daly	NWS	6	Jan 16, 1908	19 years, 73 days	Lancaster A.C., Lancaster, Pennsylvania, U.S.	
21	Win	7–0 (14)	Kid Beebe	NWS	6	Dec 12, 1907	19 years, 38 days	Lancaster A.C., Lancaster, Pennsylvania, U.S.	
20	Win	7–0 (13)	Kid Beebe	NWS	6	Nov 14, 1907	19 years, 10 days	Lancaster A.C., Lancaster, Pennsylvania, U.S.	
19	Draw	7–0 (12)	Frankie Moore	NWS	6	Oct 17, 1907	18 years, 347 days	Lancaster A.C., Lancaster, Pennsylvania, U.S.	
18	Draw	7–0 (11)	Reddy Moore	NWS	6	Jun 12, 1907	18 years, 220 days	Lancaster A.C., Lancaster, Pennsylvania, U.S.	
17	Win	7–0 (10)	Buck Eagan	PTS	6	Apr 25, 1907	18 years, 172 days	Lancaster A.C., Lancaster, Pennsylvania, U.S.	
16	Win	6–0 (10)	Young Kid Broad	NWS	6	Apr 4, 1907	18 years, 151 days	Lancaster A.C., Lancaster, Pennsylvania, U.S.	
15	Win	6–0 (9)	Young Kid Broad	TKO	2 (6)	Feb 21, 1907	18 years, 109 days	Lancaster A.C., Lancaster, Pennsylvania, U.S.	
14	Win	5–0 (9)	Young Marshall	KO	2 (6)	Jan 24, 1907	18 years, 81 days	Maennerchor Hall, Lancaster, Pennsylvania, U.S.	
13	Win	4–0 (9)	Eddie Wallace	TKO	5 (6)	Dec 13, 1906	18 years, 39 days	Lancaster A.C., Lancaster, Pennsylvania, U.S.	
12	Win	3–0 (9)	Jack Britton	NWS	6	Oct 18, 1906	17 years, 348 days	Lancaster A.C., Lancaster, Pennsylvania, U.S.	
11	Win	3–0 (8)	Hugh McCann	KO	5 (6)	Jun 4, 1906	17 years, 212 days	Prince Street Hall, Lancaster, Pennsylvania, U.S.	
10	Draw	2–0 (8)	Jimmy Livingstone	NWS	6	May 17, 1906	17 years, 194 days	Prince Street Hall, Lancaster, Pennsylvania, U.S.	
9	Draw	2–0 (7)	Sam Parks	NWS	6	Apr 18, 1906	17 years, 165 days	Prince Street Hall, Lancaster, Pennsylvania, U.S.	
8	Win	2–0 (6)	Sam Parks	NWS	6	Mar 7, 1906	17 years, 123 days	Maennerchor Hall, Lancaster, Pennsylvania, U.S.	
7	Win	2–0 (5)	Tommy Dugan	KO	2 (6)	Feb 21, 1906	17 years, 109 days	Lancaster A.C., Lancaster, Pennsylvania, U.S.	
6	Win	1–0 (5)	Young Jack Hanlon	NWS	6	Jan 24, 1906	17 years, 81 days	Lancaster A.C., Lancaster, Pennsylvania, U.S.	
5	Draw	1–0 (4)	Pinky Evans	NWS	6	Apr 7, 1905	16 years, 154 days	Lancaster A.C., Lancaster, Pennsylvania, U.S.	
4	Win	1–0 (3)	Walter Groff	NWS	6	Feb 17, 1905	16 years, 105 days	Maennerchor Hall, Lancaster, Pennsylvania, U.S.	
3	Win	1–0 (2)	Young White	KO	3 (?)	Jan 20, 1905	16 years, 77 days	Jack Milley's Club, Lancaster, Pennsylvania, U.S.	
2	Win	0–0 (2)	Carl Kreckel	NWS	4	Nov 12, 1904	16 years, 8 days	Terre Hill, Pennsylvania, U.S.	
1	NC	0–0 (1)	Young Warren	NC	3 (4)	Oct 20, 1904	15 years, 351 days	Maennerchor Hall, Lancaster, Pennsylvania, U.S.	

=== Unofficial record ===
211 fights	144 wins	39 losses
By knockout	21	2
By decision	123	36
By disqualification	0	1
Draws	27	
No contests	1	

Record with the inclusion of newspaper decisions in the win/loss/draw column.

No.	Result	Record	Opponent	Type	Round(s)	Date	Age	Location	Note
211	Win	144–39–27 (1)	"Sailor" Jack Grady	TKO	3 (8)	Aug 9, 1926	37 years, 278 days	Rossmere Park, Lancaster, Pennsylvania, U.S.	
210	Win	143–39–27 (1)	Buck Aston	NWS	8	May 7, 1923	34 years, 184 days	Fulton Opera House, Lancaster, Pennsylvania, U.S.	
209	Win	142–39–27 (1)	Lew Schupp	NWS	8	Oct 23, 1922	33 years, 353 days	Fulton Opera House, Lancaster, Pennsylvania, U.S.	
208	Draw	141–39–27 (1)	Jackie Clark	NWS	8	Oct 2, 1922	33 years, 332 days	Fulton Opera House, Lancaster, Pennsylvania, U.S.	
207	Win	141–39–26 (1)	Jim Holland	NWS	8	Aug 28, 1922	33 years, 297 days	Rocky Springs Park, Lancaster, Pennsylvania, U.S.	
206	Win	140–39–26 (1)	Frankie Britton	NWS	8	Jul 24, 1922	33 years, 262 days	Rossmere Park, Lancaster, Pennsylvania, U.S.	
205	Win	139–39–26 (1)	Santiago Esparraguera	KO	4 (10)	Jun 17, 1922	33 years, 225 days	Nuevo Fronton, Havana, Cuba	
204	Win	138–39–26 (1)	Kid Cardenas	PTS	10	May 20, 1922	33 years, 197 days	Nuevo Fronton, Havana, Cuba	
203	Win	137–39–26 (1)	Herman Smith	NWS	8	May 1, 1922	33 years, 178 days	Orpheum Theatre, York, Pennsylvania, U.S.	
202	Win	136–39–26 (1)	Lew Schupp	NWS	8	Apr 17, 1922	33 years, 164 days	Fulton Opera House, Lancaster, Pennsylvania, U.S.	
201	Win	135–39–26 (1)	Ray Smith	NWS	8	Mar 13, 1922	33 years, 129 days	Fulton Opera House, Lancaster, Pennsylvania, U.S.	
200	Loss	134–39–26 (1)	Dan O'Dowd	NWS	8	May 21, 1921	32 years, 198 days	Atlantic City, New Jersey, U.S.	
199	Loss	134–38–26 (1)	Gene Tunney	NWS	10	Dec 7, 1920	32 years, 33 days	Regiment Armory, Jersey City, New Jersey, U.S.	
198	Draw	134–37–26 (1)	Leo Leonard	NWS	10	Nov 29, 1920	32 years, 25 days	Williamsport, Pennsylvania, U.S.	
197	Loss	134–37–25 (1)	Gene Tunney	NWS	6	Nov 25, 1920	32 years, 21 days	Olympia A.C., Philadelphia, Pennsylvania, U.S.	
196	Win	134–36–25 (1)	K.O. Sullivan	NWS	10	Nov 12, 1920	32 years, 8 days	Third Regiment Armory, Camden, New Jersey, U.S.	
195	Draw	133–36–25 (1)	Fay Keiser	PTS	10	Oct 23, 1920	31 years, 354 days	Roller Rink, Cumberland, Maryland, U.S.	
194	Win	133–36–24 (1)	Frankie Farron	NWS	6	Oct 22, 1920	31 years, 353 days	Rocky Springs Park, Lancaster, Pennsylvania, U.S.	
193	Win	132–36–24 (1)	Herman Miller	NWS	10	Jun 22, 1920	31 years, 231 days	Norfolk, Virginia, U.S.	
192	Win	131–36–24 (1)	K.O. Sullivan	NWS	10	May 31, 1920	31 years, 209 days	Railway Park, Pottsville, Pennsylvania, U.S.	
191	Loss	130–36–24 (1)	George K.O. Samson	NWS	6	May 14, 1920	31 years, 192 days	Opera House, Columbia, Pennsylvania, U.S.	
190	Win	130–35–24 (1)	Rudolph Martine	TKO	6 (6)	May 10, 1920	31 years, 188 days	Fulton Opera House, Lancaster, Pennsylvania, U.S.	
189	Win	129–35–24 (1)	Johnny Howard	NWS	8	Mar 16, 1920	31 years, 133 days	Schuetzen Park, Bayonne, New Jersey, U.S.	
188	Win	128–35–24 (1)	George K.O. Samson	NWS	6	Mar 11, 1920	31 years, 128 days	Germantown A.C., Philadelphia, Pennsylvania, U.S.	
187	Loss	127–35–24 (1)	Jackie Clark	NWS	6	Mar 8, 1920	31 years, 125 days	Fulton Opera House, Lancaster, Pennsylvania, U.S.	
186	Loss	127–34–24 (1)	Roddie MacDonald	PTS	15	Feb 3, 1920	31 years, 91 days	Armouries, Halifax, Nova Scotia, Canada	
185	Win	127–33–24 (1)	Eddie Revoire	NWS	6	Jan 21, 1920	31 years, 78 days	Olympia A.C., Philadelphia, Pennsylvania, U.S.	
184	Win	126–33–24 (1)	George K.O. Samson	NWS	6	Jan 10, 1920	31 years, 67 days	National A.C., Philadelphia, Pennsylvania, U.S.	
183	Win	125–33–24 (1)	Bert Kenny	NWS	4	Dec 15, 1919	31 years, 41 days	Manor Street Theatre, Lancaster, Pennsylvania, U.S.	
182	Win	124–33–24 (1)	Harry Applegate	KO	2 (?)	Dec 12, 1919	31 years, 38 days	York A.C., York, Pennsylvania, U.S.	
181	Win	123–33–24 (1)	George K.O. Samson	NWS	6	Nov 24, 1919	31 years, 20 days	Maple Grove, Lancaster, Pennsylvania, U.S.	
180	Win	122–33–24 (1)	George K.O. Samson	NWS	6	Oct 6, 1919	30 years, 336 days	Frank Erne Club, Lancaster, Pennsylvania, U.S.	
179	Win	121–33–24 (1)	Bert Kenny	NWS	8	Sep 11, 1919	30 years, 311 days	Atlantic City, New Jersey, U.S.	
178	Win	120–33–24 (1)	Larry Williams	NWS	6	Apr 28, 1919	30 years, 175 days	Frank Erne Club, Lancaster, Pennsylvania, U.S.	
177	Loss	119–33–24 (1)	Harry Greb	NWS	10	Apr 25, 1919	30 years, 172 days	Carney Auditorium, Erie, Pennsylvania, U.S.	
176	Loss	119–32–24 (1)	Joe Allison	NWS	8	Apr 4, 1919	30 years, 151 days	Penns Grove, New Jersey, U.S.	
175	Win	119–31–24 (1)	Al Thiel	NWS	6	Mar 31, 1919	30 years, 147 days	Frank Erne Club, Lancaster, Pennsylvania, U.S.	
174	Loss	118–31–24 (1)	Larry Williams	NWS	6	Mar 28, 1919	30 years, 144 days	Orpheum Theater, Harrisburg, Pennsylvania, U.S.	
173	Loss	118–30–24 (1)	Mike Gibbons	NWS	8	Mar 25, 1919	30 years, 141 days	Coliseum, Saint Louis, Missouri, U.S.	
172	Win	118–29–24 (1)	Jack Clifford	NWS	6	Mar 14, 1919	30 years, 130 days	Cambria A.C., Philadelphia, Pennsylvania, U.S.	
171	Loss	117–29–24 (1)	Harry Greb	NWS	6	Mar 6, 1919	30 years, 122 days	Fulton Opera House, Lancaster, Pennsylvania, U.S.	
170	Win	117–28–24 (1)	Zulu Kid	NWS	6	Feb 24, 1919	30 years, 112 days	Manor Street Theatre, Lancaster, Pennsylvania, U.S.	Not to be confused with Young Zulu Kid
169	Draw	116–28–24 (1)	Roddie MacDonald	PTS	15	Feb 20, 1919	30 years, 108 days	Halifax, Nova Scotia, Canada	
168	Win	116–28–23 (1)	Bob Grant	KO	1 (6), 1:00	Feb 3, 1919	30 years, 91 days	Frank Erne Club, Lancaster, Pennsylvania, U.S.	
167	Win	115–28–23 (1)	Battling Kopin	KO	3 (6)	Jan 20, 1919	30 years, 77 days	Frank Erne Club, Lancaster, Pennsylvania, U.S.	
166	Loss	114–28–23 (1)	Harry Greb	PTS	12	Jan 14, 1919	30 years, 71 days	Arena, Boston, Massachusetts, U.S.	
165	Loss	114–27–23 (1)	Battling Levinsky	NWS	6	Dec 25, 1918	30 years, 51 days	Frank Erne Club, Lancaster, Pennsylvania, U.S.	
164	Win	114–26–23 (1)	Pete Malone	PTS	4	Jul 30, 1918	29 years, 268 days	Chester, Pennsylvania, U.S.	
163	Draw	113–26–23 (1)	Jeff Smith	NWS	6	Jul 4, 1918	29 years, 242 days	Erne's Open Air Arena, Lancaster, Pennsylvania, U.S.	
162	Win	113–26–22 (1)	Edward "Gunboat" Smith	NWS	6	May 27, 1918	29 years, 204 days	Frank Erne Club, Lancaster, Pennsylvania, U.S.	
161	Win	112–26–22 (1)	Clay Turner	NWS	6	Apr 23, 1918	29 years, 170 days	Frank Erne Club, Lancaster, Pennsylvania, U.S.	
160	Loss	111–26–22 (1)	Johnny Wilson	PTS	12	Apr 15, 1918	29 years, 162 days	Douglas A.C., Chelsea, Massachusetts, U.S.	
159	Win	111–25–22 (1)	Johnny Wilson	PTS	12	Mar 11, 1918	29 years, 127 days	Douglas A.C., Chelsea, Massachusetts, U.S.	
158	Win	110–25–22 (1)	Chuck Wiggins	NWS	6	Mar 4, 1918	29 years, 120 days	Lancaster, Pennsylvania, U.S.	
157	Loss	109–25–22 (1)	Jack McCarron	NWS	6	Feb 22, 1918	29 years, 110 days	Cambria A.C., Philadelphia, Pennsylvania, U.S.	
156	Win	109–24–22 (1)	Chuck Wiggins	NWS	6	Jan 1, 1918	29 years, 58 days	National A.C., Philadelphia, Pennsylvania, U.S.	
155	Win	108–24–22 (1)	George Ashe	NWS	6	Dec 25, 1917	29 years, 51 days	Frank Erne Club, Lancaster, Pennsylvania, U.S.	
154	Win	107–24–22 (1)	K.O. Willie Loughlin	NWS	6	Dec 10, 1917	29 years, 36 days	Frank Erne Club, Lancaster, Pennsylvania, U.S.	
153	Win	106–24–22 (1)	Buck Crouse	NWS	6	Nov 19, 1917	29 years, 15 days	Lancaster, Pennsylvania, U.S.	
152	Win	105–24–22 (1)	Willie Meehan	NWS	6	Oct 26, 1917	28 years, 356 days	Cambria A.C., Philadelphia, Pennsylvania, U.S.	
151	Win	104–24–22 (1)	Jack McCarron	NWS	6	Oct 22, 1917	28 years, 352 days	Frank Erne Club, Lancaster, Pennsylvania, U.S.	
150	Win	103–24–22 (1)	Herman Miller	NWS	6	Sep 18, 1917	28 years, 318 days	York, Pennsylvania, U.S.	
149	Win	102–24–22 (1)	See Saw Kelly	KO	3 (6)	May 22, 1917	28 years, 199 days	Manor Street Theatre, Lancaster, Pennsylvania, U.S.	
148	Loss	101–24–22 (1)	Battling Levinsky	NWS	6	May 16, 1917	28 years, 193 days	York Opera House, York, Pennsylvania, U.S.	
147	Win	101–23–22 (1)	Jackie Clark	NWS	6	May 7, 1917	28 years, 184 days	Lancaster, Pennsylvania, U.S.	
146	Win	100–23–22 (1)	Tommy Burke	NWS	6	Apr 16, 1917	28 years, 163 days	Fulton Opera House, Lancaster, Pennsylvania, U.S.	
145	Win	99–23–22 (1)	Dummy Ketchell	NWS	6	Mar 20, 1917	28 years, 136 days	Eighth Ward Theatre, Lancaster, Pennsylvania, U.S.	
144	Win	98–23–22 (1)	Eddie Revoire	NWS	6	Jan 22, 1917	28 years, 79 days	Frank Erne Club, Lancaster, Pennsylvania, U.S.	
143	Win	97–23–22 (1)	Fay Keiser	PTS	10	Dec 27, 1916	28 years, 53 days	Cumberland, Maryland, U.S.	
142	Draw	96–23–22 (1)	Al Grayber	NWS	6	Dec 9, 1916	28 years, 35 days	Power Auditorium, Pittsburgh, Pennsylvania, U.S.	
141	Win	96–23–21 (1)	Jack Reck	NWS	6	May 15, 1916	27 years, 193 days	Family Theatre, Lancaster, Pennsylvania, U.S.	
140	Win	95–23–21 (1)	Ralph Erne	NWS	6	Apr 25, 1916	27 years, 173 days	Coliseum Hall, York, Pennsylvania, U.S.	
139	Win	94–23–21 (1)	Herman Miller	PTS	6	Apr 7, 1916	27 years, 155 days	York, Pennsylvania, U.S.	
138	Win	93–23–21 (1)	Jack Reck	NWS	6	Mar 29, 1916	27 years, 146 days	Keystone AC, Harrisburg, Pennsylvania, U.S.	
137	Win	92–23–21 (1)	K.O. Sullivan	NWS	6	Mar 13, 1916	27 years, 130 days	Lancaster, Pennsylvania, U.S.	
136	Loss	91–23–21 (1)	Eddie Revoire	NWS	6	Mar 7, 1916	27 years, 124 days	Auditorium, Reading, Pennsylvania, U.S.	
135	Win	91–22–21 (1)	Battling Brandt	NWS	6	Feb 29, 1916	27 years, 117 days	York, Pennsylvania, U.S.	
134	Win	90–22–21 (1)	Billy Berger	NWS	6	Feb 14, 1916	27 years, 102 days	Lancaster A.C., Lancaster, Pennsylvania, U.S.	
133	Win	89–22–21 (1)	Willie Baker	NWS	6	Nov 22, 1915	27 years, 18 days	Olympia A.C., Philadelphia, Pennsylvania, U.S.	
132	Loss	88–22–21 (1)	Charles "Sailor" Grande	NWS	6	Nov 16, 1915	27 years, 12 days	Douglas A.C., Philadelphia, Pennsylvania, U.S.	
131	Win	88–21–21 (1)	Al Rogers	NWS	6	Nov 15, 1915	27 years, 11 days	Frohsinn Hall, Altoona, Pennsylvania, U.S.	
130	Draw	87–21–21 (1)	Bill Fleming	NWS	3	Nov 11, 1915	27 years, 7 days	Falcon Hall, Meriden, Connecticut, U.S.	
129	Win	87–21–20 (1)	Johnny Howard	NWS	6	Sep 30, 1915	26 years, 330 days	Rocky Springs Park, Lancaster, Pennsylvania, U.S.	
128	Win	86–21–20 (1)	Herman Miller	TKO	6 (10)	Sep 14, 1915	26 years, 314 days	Conestoga Park, Lancaster, Pennsylvania, U.S.	
127	Win	85–21–20 (1)	Bert Kenny	NWS	10	Sep 10, 1915	26 years, 310 days	New Polo A.C., New York City, New York, U.S.	
126	Draw	84–21–20 (1)	Charles "Sailor" Grande	NWS	6	Jul 26, 1915	26 years, 264 days	Lancaster, Pennsylvania, U.S.	
125	Loss	84–21–19 (1)	Young Ahearn	NWS	10	Jun 7, 1915	26 years, 215 days	Capitol District A.C., Albany, New York, U.S.	
124	Loss	84–20–19 (1)	Mike Gibbons	NWS	10	May 26, 1915	26 years, 203 days	St. Nicholas Arena, New York City, New York, U.S.	
123	Win	84–19–19 (1)	Frank Mantell	PTS	12	May 19, 1915	26 years, 196 days	Rhode Island A.C., Providence, Rhode Island, U.S.	
122	Loss	83–19–19 (1)	Young Ahearn	NWS	10	Apr 22, 1915	26 years, 169 days	Irving A.C., New York City, New York, U.S.	
121	Win	83–18–19 (1)	George K.O. Brown	PTS	10	Apr 8, 1915	26 years, 155 days	Bijou Theater, Atlanta, Georgia, U.S.	
120	Win	82–18–19 (1)	Al Grayber	NWS	10	Mar 30, 1915	26 years, 146 days	Fairmont A.C., Philadelphia, Pennsylvania, U.S.	
119	Win	81–18–19 (1)	George Ashe	NWS	10	Mar 27, 1915	26 years, 143 days	Irving A.C., New York City, New York, U.S.	
118	Win	80–18–19 (1)	Jack Toland	KO	3 (?)	Mar 22, 1915	26 years, 138 days	Lancaster, Pennsylvania, U.S.	
117	Win	79–18–19 (1)	Emmett "Kid" Wagner	NWS	6	Nov 16, 1914	26 years, 12 days	Prince Street Hall, Lancaster, Pennsylvania, U.S.	
116	Loss	78–18–19 (1)	Young Ahearn	NWS	6	Nov 14, 1914	26 years, 10 days	National A.C., Philadelphia, Pennsylvania, U.S.	
115	Win	78–17–19 (1)	Tommy Gavigan	TKO	11 (12)	Sep 7, 1914	25 years, 307 days	Wright Field, Youngstown, Ohio, U.S.	
114	Win	77–17–19 (1)	George Chip	NWS	12	Apr 21, 1914	25 years, 168 days	Grand Opera House, Youngstown, Ohio, U.S.	
113	Loss	76–17–19 (1)	Billy Murray	TKO	14 (20)	Feb 23, 1914	25 years, 111 days	Coffroth's Arena, Daly City, California, U.S.	
112	Loss	76–16–19 (1)	Joe Borrell	NWS	6	Jan 17, 1914	25 years, 74 days	National A.C., Philadelphia, Pennsylvania, U.S.	
111	Win	76–15–19 (1)	Joe Borrell	NWS	6	Dec 20, 1913	25 years, 46 days	National A.C., Philadelphia, Pennsylvania, U.S.	
110	Win	75–15–19 (1)	George Chip	NWS	6	Nov 15, 1913	25 years, 11 days	National A.C., Philadelphia, Pennsylvania, U.S.	NYSAC middleweight title at stake; (via KO only)
109	Win	74–15–19 (1)	Jack Dillon	NWS	6	Oct 9, 1913	24 years, 339 days	Rocky Springs Park, Lancaster, Pennsylvania, U.S.	
108	Win	73–15–19 (1)	Tommy Bergin	NWS	6	Sep 6, 1913	24 years, 306 days	National A.C., Philadelphia, Pennsylvania, U.S.	
107	Win	72–15–19 (1)	Buck Crouse	NWS	6	May 29, 1913	24 years, 206 days	Prince Street Hall, Lancaster, Pennsylvania, U.S.	
106	Win	71–15–19 (1)	George K.O. Brown	NWS	10	May 7, 1913	24 years, 184 days	St. Nicholas Arena, New York City, New York, U.S.	
105	Win	70–15–19 (1)	Richard Gilbert	NWS	6	Mar 27, 1913	24 years, 143 days	Lancaster A.C., Lancaster, Pennsylvania, U.S.	
104	Draw	69–15–19 (1)	Al Rogers	NWS	6	Feb 10, 1913	24 years, 98 days	Mishler Theatre, Altoona, Pennsylvania, U.S.	
103	Loss	69–15–18 (1)	Jack Dillon	NWS	6	Jan 22, 1913	24 years, 79 days	Olympia A.C., Philadelphia, Pennsylvania, U.S.	
102	Win	69–14–18 (1)	Freddie Hicks	NWS	6	Jan 15, 1913	24 years, 72 days	Prince Street Hall, Lancaster, Pennsylvania, U.S.	
101	Draw	68–14–18 (1)	Emmett "Kid" Wagner	NWS	6	Nov 25, 1912	24 years, 21 days	Town Hall, Scranton, Pennsylvania, U.S.	
100	Win	68–14–17 (1)	Larry Williams	KO	4 (6)	Nov 15, 1912	24 years, 11 days	Lancaster, Pennsylvania, U.S.	
99	Win	67–14–17 (1)	Dave Smith	NWS	6	Nov 8, 1912	24 years, 4 days	Olympia A.C., Philadelphia, Pennsylvania, U.S.	
98	Win	66–14–17 (1)	Jack Fitzgerald	NWS	6	Oct 28, 1912	23 years, 359 days	Scranton, Pennsylvania, U.S.	
97	Win	65–14–17 (1)	Eddie McGoorty	NWS	6	Oct 9, 1912	23 years, 340 days	National A.C., Philadelphia, Pennsylvania, U.S.	
96	Win	64–14–17 (1)	Billy Papke	NWS	6	Sep 27, 1912	23 years, 328 days	Olympia A.C., Philadelphia, Pennsylvania, U.S.	
95	Win	63–14–17 (1)	Peck Miller	NWS	6	Sep 19, 1912	23 years, 320 days	Prince Street Hall, Lancaster, Pennsylvania, U.S.	
94	Win	62–14–17 (1)	George Chip	NWS	6	Jun 13, 1912	23 years, 222 days	Rossmere Park, Lancaster, Pennsylvania, U.S.	
93	Win	61–14–17 (1)	Jack Fitzgerald	NWS	6	May 23, 1912	23 years, 201 days	Lancaster, Pennsylvania, U.S.	
92	Loss	60–14–17 (1)	Buck Crouse	PTS	12	May 7, 1912	23 years, 185 days	Pilgrim A.A., Boston, Massachusetts, U.S.	
91	Win	60–13–17 (1)	Peck Miller	NWS	6	Apr 23, 1912	23 years, 171 days	Prince Street Hall, Lancaster, Pennsylvania, U.S.	
90	Win	59–13–17 (1)	Bob Moha	NWS	6	Apr 20, 1912	23 years, 168 days	National A.C., Philadelphia, Pennsylvania, U.S.	
89	Win	58–13–17 (1)	Peck Miller	NWS	6	Apr 12, 1912	23 years, 160 days	Lancaster, Pennsylvania, U.S.	
88	Loss	57–13–17 (1)	Jack Dillon	TKO	6 (10)	Jan 1, 1912	23 years, 58 days	Auditorium (Virginia Ave.), Indianapolis, Indiana, U.S.	Lost world middleweight title claim
87	Draw	57–12–17 (1)	Buck Crouse	NWS	6	Dec 9, 1911	23 years, 35 days	Duquesne Garden, Pittsburgh, Pennsylvania, U.S.	
86	Loss	57–12–16 (1)	Buck Crouse	NWS	6	Nov 15, 1911	23 years, 11 days	Duquesne Garden, Pittsburgh, Pennsylvania, U.S.	
85	Draw	57–11–16 (1)	Harry Ramsey	NWS	6	Nov 3, 1911	22 years, 364 days	Nonpareil A.C., Philadelphia, Pennsylvania, U.S.	
84	Win	57–11–15 (1)	Battling Levinsky	PTS	12	Oct 24, 1911	22 years, 354 days	Arena (Armory A.A.), Boston, Massachusetts, U.S.	
83	Loss	56–11–15 (1)	Frank Klaus	NWS	6	Oct 18, 1911	22 years, 348 days	American A.C., Philadelphia, Pennsylvania, U.S.	
82	Win	56–10–15 (1)	Harry Ramsey	NWS	6	Sep 28, 1911	22 years, 328 days	Lancaster A.C., Lancaster, Pennsylvania, U.S.	
81	Win	55–10–15 (1)	Frank Mantell	NWS	10	Sep 21, 1911	22 years, 321 days	National S.C., New York City, New York, U.S.	
80	Win	54–10–15 (1)	George Chip	NWS	6	Sep 16, 1911	22 years, 316 days	National A.C., Philadelphia, Pennsylvania, U.S.	
79	Win	53–10–15 (1)	Joe Thomas	NWS	6	Jun 16, 1911	22 years, 224 days	Lancaster, Pennsylvania, U.S.	
78	Win	52–10–15 (1)	Harry Lewis	PTS	20	May 3, 1911	22 years, 180 days	L'Hippodrome, Clichy, Paris, France	Won world middleweight title claim
77	Win	51–10–15 (1)	Battling Levinsky	NWS	6	Mar 16, 1911	22 years, 132 days	Lancaster, Pennsylvania, U.S.	
76	Win	50–10–15 (1)	Harry Ramsey	NWS	6	Mar 13, 1911	22 years, 129 days	American A.C., Philadelphia, Pennsylvania, U.S.	
75	Win	49–10–15 (1)	Harry Mansfield	NWS	6	Feb 23, 1911	22 years, 111 days	Lancaster A.C., Lancaster, Pennsylvania, U.S.	
74	Loss	48–10–15 (1)	Frank Klaus	PTS	12	Feb 14, 1911	22 years, 102 days	Armory A.A., Boston, Massachusetts, U.S.	
73	Win	48–9–15 (1)	Tom McMahon	NWS	6	Feb 4, 1911	22 years, 92 days	National A.C., Philadelphia, Pennsylvania, U.S.	
72	Win	47–9–15 (1)	Battling Levinsky	NWS	6	Feb 2, 1911	22 years, 90 days	Lancaster, Pennsylvania, U.S.	
71	Win	46–9–15 (1)	Frank Mantell	PTS	15	Nov 11, 1910	22 years, 7 days	Rhode Island A.C., Thornton, New Jersey, U.S.	
70	Win	45–9–15 (1)	Frank Klaus	NWS	6	Oct 29, 1910	21 years, 359 days	National A.C., Philadelphia, Pennsylvania, U.S.	
69	Win	44–9–15 (1)	Fred Corbett	TKO	3 (6)	Oct 27, 1910	21 years, 357 days	Lancaster A.C., Lancaster, Pennsylvania, U.S.	
68	Win	43–9–15 (1)	Jimmy Gardner	NWS	6	Oct 17, 1910	21 years, 347 days	National A.C., Philadelphia, Pennsylvania, U.S.	
67	Win	42–9–15 (1)	Tommy Quill	KO	8 (12)	Oct 11, 1910	21 years, 341 days	Armory A.A., Boston, Massachusetts, U.S.	
66	Win	41–9–15 (1)	Young Loughrey	NWS	6	Oct 7, 1910	21 years, 337 days	Nonpareil A.C., Philadelphia, Pennsylvania, U.S.	
65	Win	40–9–15 (1)	Young Otto	NWS	6	Oct 1, 1910	21 years, 331 days	National A.C., Philadelphia, Pennsylvania, U.S.	
64	Win	39–9–15 (1)	Jimmy Dolan	TKO	4 (6)	Sep 28, 1910	21 years, 328 days	Lancaster A.C., Lancaster, Pennsylvania, U.S.	
63	Win	38–9–15 (1)	Harry Lewis	NWS	6	Sep 17, 1910	21 years, 317 days	National A.C., Philadelphia, Pennsylvania, U.S.	
62	Win	37–9–15 (1)	Harry Lewis	PTS	12	Aug 23, 1910	21 years, 292 days	Armory, Boston, Massachusetts, U.S.	
61	Win	36–9–15 (1)	Young Loughrey	NWS	6	Jun 23, 1910	21 years, 231 days	Lancaster A.C., Lancaster, Pennsylvania, U.S.	
60	Win	35–9–15 (1)	Joe Hirst	NWS	6	Jun 16, 1910	21 years, 224 days	Lancaster A.C., Lancaster, Pennsylvania, U.S.	
59	Loss	34–9–15 (1)	Young Loughrey	PTS	15	May 4, 1910	21 years, 181 days	Wilmington, Delaware, U.S.	
58	Win	34–8–15 (1)	Johnny Willetts	NWS	6	Apr 30, 1910	21 years, 177 days	National A.C., Philadelphia, Pennsylvania, U.S.	
57	Loss	33–8–15 (1)	Frank Perron	DQ	2 (12)	Apr 26, 1910	21 years, 173 days	Armory, Boston, Massachusetts, U.S.	
56	Draw	33–7–15 (1)	Dick Nelson	PTS	12	Apr 21, 1910	21 years, 168 days	New Haven, Connecticut, U.S.	
55	Win	33–7–14 (1)	Young Erne	NWS	6	Apr 15, 1910	21 years, 162 days	Douglas A.C., Philadelphia, Pennsylvania, U.S.	
54	Draw	32–7–14 (1)	Young Loughrey	NWS	10	Apr 7, 1910	21 years, 154 days	Academy Hall, Reading, Pennsylvania, U.S.	
53	Win	32–7–13 (1)	Young Erne	NWS	6	Mar 31, 1910	21 years, 147 days	Lancaster A.C., Lancaster, Pennsylvania, U.S.	
52	Win	31–7–13 (1)	Joe Hirst	NWS	6	Mar 17, 1910	21 years, 133 days	Lancaster A.C., Lancaster, Pennsylvania, U.S.	
51	Win	30–7–13 (1)	Young Loughrey	NWS	6	Mar 15, 1910	21 years, 131 days	Douglas A.C., Philadelphia, Pennsylvania, U.S.	
50	Win	29–7–13 (1)	Jack Cardiff	NWS	10	Mar 9, 1910	21 years, 125 days	Academy Hall, Reading, Pennsylvania, U.S.	
49	Win	28–7–13 (1)	Young Nitchie	NWS	6	Mar 3, 1910	21 years, 119 days	Lancaster A.C., Lancaster, Pennsylvania, U.S.	
48	Loss	27–7–13 (1)	Paddy Lavin	NWS	10	Feb 16, 1910	21 years, 104 days	Academy Hall, Reading, Pennsylvania, U.S.	
47	Draw	27–6–13 (1)	Young Erne	NWS	6	Feb 12, 1910	21 years, 100 days	National A.C., Philadelphia, Pennsylvania, U.S.	
46	Win	27–6–12 (1)	Tommy O'Keefe	NWS	6	Feb 10, 1910	21 years, 98 days	Lancaster A.C., Lancaster, Pennsylvania, U.S.	
45	Win	26–6–12 (1)	Mickey Gannon	NWS	6	Jan 29, 1910	21 years, 86 days	National A.C., Philadelphia, Pennsylvania, U.S.	
44	Loss	25–6–12 (1)	Joe Hirst	NWS	6	Jan 20, 1910	21 years, 77 days	Lancaster A.C., Lancaster, Pennsylvania, U.S.	
43	Win	25–5–12 (1)	Young Nitchie	NWS	10	Dec 20, 1909	21 years, 46 days	Academy Hall, Reading, Pennsylvania, U.S.	
42	Win	24–5–12 (1)	Kid Locke	NWS	6	Dec 16, 1909	21 years, 42 days	Lancaster A.C., Lancaster, Pennsylvania, U.S.	
41	Win	23–5–12 (1)	Young Kid Broad	NWS	6	Dec 2, 1909	21 years, 28 days	Lancaster A.C., Lancaster, Pennsylvania, U.S.	
40	Loss	22–5–12 (1)	Joe Hirst	NWS	6	Nov 25, 1909	21 years, 21 days	Lancaster A.C., Lancaster, Pennsylvania, U.S.	
39	Draw	22–4–12 (1)	Joe Sieger	NWS	6	Nov 11, 1909	21 years, 7 days	Lancaster A.C., Lancaster, Pennsylvania, U.S.	
38	Win	22–4–11 (1)	Mike Fleming	NWS	6	Oct 14, 1909	20 years, 344 days	Lancaster A.C., Lancaster, Pennsylvania, U.S.	
37	Win	21–4–11 (1)	Tommy O'Keefe	NWS	6	May 14, 1909	20 years, 191 days	Lancaster A.C., Lancaster, Pennsylvania, U.S.	
36	Draw	20–4–11 (1)	Grover Hayes	NWS	6	Mar 27, 1909	20 years, 143 days	National A.C., Philadelphia, Pennsylvania, U.S.	
35	Draw	20–4–10 (1)	Jack Britton	NWS	6	Mar 18, 1909	20 years, 134 days	Lancaster A.C., Lancaster, Pennsylvania, U.S.	
34	Win	20–4–9 (1)	Young Kid Broad	NWS	6	Mar 4, 1909	20 years, 120 days	Lancaster A.C., Lancaster, Pennsylvania, U.S.	
33	Win	19–4–9 (1)	Grover Hayes	NWS	6	Feb 23, 1909	20 years, 111 days	Chestnut Street Auditorium, Harrisburg, Pennsylvania, U.S.	
32	Draw	18–4–9 (1)	Kid Locke	NWS	6	Feb 18, 1909	20 years, 106 days	National A.C., Philadelphia, Pennsylvania, U.S.	
31	Draw	18–4–8 (1)	Jack Britton	NWS	6	Feb 4, 1909	20 years, 92 days	National A.C., Philadelphia, Pennsylvania, U.S.	
30	Loss	18–4–7 (1)	Eddie McAvoy	NWS	6	Jan 14, 1909	20 years, 71 days	National A.C., Philadelphia, Pennsylvania, U.S.	
29	Win	18–3–7 (1)	Phil Griffin	NWS	6	Dec 17, 1908	20 years, 43 days	National A.C., Philadelphia, Pennsylvania, U.S.	
28	Draw	17–3–7 (1)	George Decker	NWS	6	Nov 19, 1908	20 years, 15 days	National A.C., Philadelphia, Pennsylvania, U.S.	
27	Win	17–3–6 (1)	Harry Kegel	TKO	2 (6)	Oct 15, 1908	19 years, 346 days	National A.C., Philadelphia, Pennsylvania, U.S.	
26	Loss	16–3–6 (1)	Phil Griffin	NWS	6	Apr 25, 1908	19 years, 173 days	National A.C., Philadelphia, Pennsylvania, U.S.	
25	Draw	16–2–6 (1)	Willie Lucas	NWS	6	Apr 16, 1908	19 years, 164 days	Lancaster A.C., Lancaster, Pennsylvania, U.S.	
24	Loss	16–2–5 (1)	Percy Cove	NWS	6	Mar 19, 1908	19 years, 136 days	Lancaster A.C., Lancaster, Pennsylvania, U.S.	
23	Loss	16–1–5 (1)	Tommy O'Keefe	NWS	6	Feb 20, 1908	19 years, 108 days	Lancaster A.C., Lancaster, Pennsylvania, U.S.	
22	Win	16–0–5 (1)	Kid Daly	NWS	6	Jan 16, 1908	19 years, 73 days	Lancaster A.C., Lancaster, Pennsylvania, U.S.	
21	Win	15–0–5 (1)	Kid Beebe	NWS	6	Dec 12, 1907	19 years, 38 days	Lancaster A.C., Lancaster, Pennsylvania, U.S.	
20	Win	14–0–5 (1)	Kid Beebe	NWS	6	Nov 14, 1907	19 years, 10 days	Lancaster A.C., Lancaster, Pennsylvania, U.S.	
19	Draw	13–0–5 (1)	Frankie Moore	NWS	6	Oct 17, 1907	18 years, 347 days	Lancaster A.C., Lancaster, Pennsylvania, U.S.	
18	Draw	13–0–4 (1)	Reddy Moore	NWS	6	Jun 12, 1907	18 years, 220 days	Lancaster A.C., Lancaster, Pennsylvania, U.S.	
17	Win	13–0–3 (1)	Buck Eagan	PTS	6	Apr 25, 1907	18 years, 172 days	Lancaster A.C., Lancaster, Pennsylvania, U.S.	
16	Win	12–0–3 (1)	Young Kid Broad	NWS	6	Apr 4, 1907	18 years, 151 days	Lancaster A.C., Lancaster, Pennsylvania, U.S.	
15	Win	11–0–3 (1)	Young Kid Broad	TKO	2 (6)	Feb 21, 1907	18 years, 109 days	Lancaster A.C., Lancaster, Pennsylvania, U.S.	
14	Win	10–0–3 (1)	Young Marshall	KO	2 (6)	Jan 24, 1907	18 years, 81 days	Maennerchor Hall, Lancaster, Pennsylvania, U.S.	
13	Win	9–0–3 (1)	Eddie Wallace	TKO	5 (6)	Dec 13, 1906	18 years, 39 days	Lancaster A.C., Lancaster, Pennsylvania, U.S.	
12	Win	8–0–3 (1)	Jack Britton	NWS	6	Oct 18, 1906	17 years, 348 days	Lancaster A.C., Lancaster, Pennsylvania, U.S.	
11	Win	7–0–3 (1)	Hugh McCann	KO	5 (6)	Jun 4, 1906	17 years, 212 days	Prince Street Hall, Lancaster, Pennsylvania, U.S.	
10	Draw	6–0–3 (1)	Jimmy Livingstone	NWS	6	May 17, 1906	17 years, 194 days	Prince Street Hall, Lancaster, Pennsylvania, U.S.	
9	Draw	6–0–2 (1)	Sam Parks	NWS	6	Apr 18, 1906	17 years, 165 days	Prince Street Hall, Lancaster, Pennsylvania, U.S.	
8	Win	6–0–1 (1)	Sam Parks	NWS	6	Mar 7, 1906	17 years, 123 days	Maennerchor Hall, Lancaster, Pennsylvania, U.S.	
7	Win	5–0–1 (1)	Tommy Dugan	KO	2 (6)	Feb 21, 1906	17 years, 109 days	Lancaster A.C., Lancaster, Pennsylvania, U.S.	
6	Win	4–0–1 (1)	Young Jack Hanlon	NWS	6	Jan 24, 1906	17 years, 81 days	Lancaster A.C., Lancaster, Pennsylvania, U.S.	
5	Draw	3–0–1 (1)	Pinky Evans	NWS	6	Apr 7, 1905	16 years, 154 days	Lancaster A.C., Lancaster, Pennsylvania, U.S.	
4	Win	3–0 (1)	Walter Groff	NWS	6	Feb 17, 1905	16 years, 105 days	Maennerchor Hall, Lancaster, Pennsylvania, U.S.	
3	Win	2–0 (2)	Young White	KO	3 (?)	Jan 20, 1905	16 years, 77 days	Jack Milley's Club, Lancaster, Pennsylvania, U.S.	
2	Win	1–0 (1)	Carl Kreckel	NWS	4	Nov 12, 1904	16 years, 8 days	Terre Hill, Pennsylvania, U.S.	
1	NC	0–0 (1)	Young Warren	NC	3 (4)	Oct 20, 1904	15 years, 351 days	Maennerchor Hall, Lancaster, Pennsylvania, U.S.	
