= From Bondage to Freedom =

- Produced by: Clement Mason
- Starring: Dave Smith; Jack Read
- Production company: Clement Mason Cinematographic Company
- Release date: November 1911
- Running time: 2,500 feet
- Country: Australia
- Language: Silent film

From Bondage to Freedom is a 1911 Australian film starring the boxer Dave Smith.

It was described as "a great Australian drama with a stadium interest".

It is considered a lost film.
