= Dave Smith (boxer) =

Australian boxer, born 1886

Dave Smith (1886 – 29 May 1945) was a champion New Zealand-born boxer.

Smith had success as an amateur boxer in New Zealand, winning Otago and Dunedin titles, and moved to Australia in 1907 to pursue a professional career.

He became the heavyweight champion of Australia, and travelled to the United States looking for a shot at the world title. On his return to Australia he beat Bill Lang to win the Commonwealth heavyweight title.

He appeared in the films From Bondage to Freedom (1911) and In the Last Stride (1916). He was also announced to play the lead in a film called An Australian Hero and the Red Spiders which may not have been made.

Dave Smith died on 29 May 1945 in Sydney.

Dave was the 2009 Inductee for the Australian National Boxing Hall of Fame Old Timers category.
