= Jimmy Jacobs (handballer) =

American handball player (1930–1988)

- Born: February 18, 1930; St. Louis, Missouri, U.S.
- Died: March 23, 1988 (aged 58); New York City, New York, U.S.
- Occupations: American handball player, boxing manager
- Spouse: Lorraine Atter

James Leslie Jacobs (February 18, 1930 – March 23, 1988) was an American handball player, boxing manager, and comic book and fight film collector.

== American handball ==
Born in St. Louis, Missouri, Jacobs was Jewish. He grew up in a single-parent family in Los Angeles. He dropped out of high school before completing his education but excelled at numerous sports, including baseball, basketball, football and handball. He was credited with running 100 yards (91 m) in under ten seconds, winning a skeet shooting championship and shooting rounds of golf in the low 70s. Jacobs was offered the chance to try out for the US Olympic basketball team but declined in order to focus on handball. He was drafted into the army during the Korean War and was awarded a Purple Heart.

In four-wall handball, Jacobs won his first American singles championship in 1955, defeating Vic Hershkowitz in the final in Chicago. In total, he won six American singles championships and six doubles championships (partnering Marty Decatur). He was additionally a three time national champion in three-wall handball. Between 1955 and 1969, he won every national handball competition match he played in. In 1966, Robert H. Boyle of Sports Illustrated wrote: "Jacobs is generally hailed as the finest player of all time. Indeed, there are those who say Jacobs is the best athlete, regardless of sport, in the country." In 1970, he was recognized by the US Handball Association as the "Greatest Handball Player of the Generation". In 1971, on behalf of the United States government, he toured Germany and England with handballer Simon Singer, giving clinics and exhibitions to Air Force personnel.

== Boxing ==
A longtime boxing enthusiast, Jacobs started collecting films of boxing matches at the age of 17 after reading about the controversial decision in Joe Louis and Jersey Joe Walcott's 1947 world heavyweight title fight. Wanting to judge the result for himself, he tracked down and purchased a copy of the fight. Whilst touring Europe as a handball player, he began buying up old fight films, many of which had been shipped out of America in the wake of the 1912 Congressional ban on the interstate trafficking of boxing films. Jacobs became friends with the boxing trainer Cus D'Amato. D'Amato secretly trained Jacobs intensively for six months with a view to his facing reigning world light-heavyweight champion Archie Moore, intending to make history by leading a boxer to a world title in his first ever fight. However, the bout failed to materialize. Moore apparently remarked to Jacobs, "There are two possibilities: either you win or I kill you. Both are unacceptable to me."

In 1959 Jacobs went into business with fellow collector Bill Cayton, and together they owned the production companies The Greatest Fights of the Century and Big Fights inc. He and Cayton rescued and restored rare films of such fighters as Bob Fitzsimmons, Jack Johnson, Jack Dempsey and James J. Corbett, which might otherwise have been lost forever. In 1974, they purchased the Madison Square Garden fight archive. The result was that between them they amassed the world's largest collection of fight films (between 16,000 and 26,000), dating from the 1890s through to the present day. In 1998 Cayton sold the collection to ESPN for a reported $100 million. They also made over 1000 boxing documentaries and productions, including a.k.a. Cassius Clay, Jack Johnson, The Heavyweight Champions and Legendary Champions; the latter three were nominated for Academy Awards.

In 1978 Jacobs and Cayton bought the management contract of world light-welterweight champion Wilfred Benítez from Benitez' father for $75,000 and guided him to two more championships and over $6.5 million in purses. The partnership ended in December 1983 when Benitez bought out his contract in order to manage himself. In 1984 they signed the 18-year-old Mike Tyson, who was being trained by Jacobs' old friend D'Amato, and oversaw his rise to become undisputed world heavyweight champion; Jacobs became a close friend and mentor of Tyson. They also managed Edwin Rosario, who became a three time world lightweight champion, and 1970s middleweight contender Eugene Hart. Jacobs was named Manager of the Year by the Boxing Writers Association of America in 1986.

== Comics ==
Jacobs also acquired an extensive collection of comic books, having read them since his youth. His collection was thought to contain between 500,000 and 880,000 comics, and had to be stored in a warehouse. Jacobs owned six copies of a rare Detective Comics issue from 1938, worth $10,000 each at the time of his death.

Larry Merchant, who knew Jacobs well, characterized him:

Jimmy Jacobs is the only guy I ever knew who had Three Greatest in front of his name:

1. He's the greatest handball player who ever lived, he's regarded as the Babe Ruth of his sport.
2. He has the greatest collection of fight films in the world some 98% of all the fight films ever made. 26,000 of them, and
3. He has the greatest collection of comic books in the world. Every comic book ever published in America has gone to a warehouse in Los Angeles.

And now he wants a Fourth Greatest, to have the greatest fighter in the world.

— Larry Merchant, May 20, 1986

== Death and halls of fame ==
Jacobs died of leukemia in 1988. He is an inductee of the International Boxing Hall of Fame, the World Boxing Hall of Fame, the International Jewish Sports Hall of Fame and the US Handball Hall of Fame. In 1990 he was inducted into the inaugural class of the Southern California Jewish Sports Hall of Fame. He posthumously appeared in the boxing documentaries When We Were Kings and Tyson in archive footage.
