= Hard music =

Hard music is most commonly associated with the hard rock genre, but it may also refer to any number of subgenres with hard in the name, most of which have no connection to hard rock. (Note: Some artists, such as Miles Davis on the Jack Johnson album, have fused these hard genres with hard rock, although they are the exception rather than the norm) These are:

- Hard bop
- Hard dance
  - Hard NRG
  - Hard trance
  - Hardbag
  - Hardbass
  - Hardstyle
  - UK hard house
    - Hard bounce
  - UK hardcore
- Hard funk
- Hard pop (disambiguation)
- Hardcore (EDM)
  - Breakbeat hardcore
  - Digital hardcore
  - Happy hardcore
  - Hard techno
  - Hardcore breaks
  - Industrial hardcore
  - Mainstream hardcore
  - UK hardcore
- Hardcore punk
  - Beatdown hardcore
  - Christian hardcore
  - Digital hardcore
  - Japanese hardcore
  - Heavy hardcore
  - Horror hardcore
  - Melodic hardcore
  - New York hardcore
  - Positive hardcore
  - Washington D.C. hardcore
- Hardvapour
- Hardwave
- Post-hardcore

== See also ==
- Hard rock (disambiguation)
- "Heavy Music", a 1967 song by Bob Seger & The Last Heard
