= Jack Johnson (film) =

1970 film

- Directed by: Jimmy Jacobs
- Written by: Alan Bodian
- Produced by: Jimmy Jacobs
- Narrated by: Kevin Kennedy; Brock Peters
- Cinematography: Lawrence Garinger
- Edited by: John Dandre
- Music by: Miles Davis
- Distributed by: The Big Fights
- Release date: 1970
- Running time: 90 minutes
- Country: United States
- Language: English

Jack Johnson is a 1970 American documentary film directed by Jimmy Jacobs about the American boxer Jack Johnson (1878–1946).

== Production ==
Johnson had been the subject of the 1967 play The Great White Hope written by Howard Sackler which was later adapted into a 1970 film. Jacobs and Clayton had previously collaborated on boxing documentaries Legendary Champions (1968) and A.k.a. Cassius Clay (1970).

Clayton asked jazz artist Miles Davis to record music for the documentary, which resulted in Davis' 1971 album of the same name.

== Accolades ==
It was nominated for an Academy Award for Best Documentary Feature.

== See also ==
- List of American films of 1970
- Unforgivable Blackness: The Rise and Fall of Jack Johnson
