= Bill Cayton =

American boxing promoter (1918–2003)

William D'Arcy Cayton (June 6, 1918 – October 4, 2003) was a boxing promoter and manager. Clients included Mike Tyson, who sued him, yet retained him as manager when the two settled the lawsuit four years later, in 1988. Cayton also acted as a film historian and producer to preserve boxing's legacy. During his career, Cayton founded or co-founded several companies, including Cayton Sports, Inc., Reel Sports., Inc., Radio and Television Packagers, Inc. and Cayton, Inc.

== Biography ==
- Born in New York City, Cayton graduated from the University of Maryland in 1937 with a degree in chemical engineering and founded advertising agency, Cayton Inc. in 1945. He became involved in boxing in 1948 when he created and produced the TV program titled "Greatest Fights of the Century" to promote Vaseline brand hair tonic. Television was then in its infancy, and Cayton felt that boxing was the sport that lent itself best to the tiny black and white screens of the time.

To create the program, and many others that followed, he licensed, then later acquired, rights to vintage boxing film footage, and for nearly fifty years amassed and restored a collection of thousands of films going back to 1897. These films featured such legendary boxers as Jim Corbett, Jack Johnson (with a soundtrack by Miles Davis), Jack Dempsey, Joe Louis, Rocky Marciano, Sugar Ray Robinson, Muhammad Ali, George Foreman, Wilfred Benítez, and Kid Gavilán. Cayton even acquired rights to the first boxing film ever made, a sparring session filmed by Thomas Edison in 1894. His effort in collecting, restoring, and maintaining these films, many of which were rapidly deteriorating, is credited for preserving modern boxing's heritage and history.

In 1960 Cayton was joined by boxing historian and film collector Jim Jacobs, forming The Big Fights, Inc. With the guidance of boxing manager and trainer Cus D'Amato, the pair also subsequently went into managing boxers, nurturing such fighters as Wilfred Benítez, Edwin Rosario, and "Iron" Mike Tyson to world titles. Following Jacobs's death in 1988, Cayton managed world champions Tommy Morrison, Vinny Pazienza, and championship contenders Jeremy Williams, Michael Grant, and Omar Sheika, among others.

The Big Fights also produced numerous boxing features including a.k.a. Cassius Clay and Academy Award-nominated films Jack Johnson and Legendary Champions. One of Cayton's hires in the 1960s was a then-unknown Harry Chapin, who was assigned a film editor's position, and who worked on Legendary Champions as its writer and director. Cayton fired Chapin numerous times for missing work, or for coming in late due to his musical pursuits, only to re-hire Chapin each time because of his talent and his endearing personality.

Cayton sold his film and tape library to the Walt Disney Company in 1998, which shows many of the titles on its ESPN Classic network. Cayton was also hired as the boxing coordinator for ESPN2's "Friday Night Fights" show, which experienced a resurgence in ratings and the level of competition shown due to Cayton's influence.

Cayton's advertising agency remained active until well into the 1970s.

== Children's television ==
In 1957, working with director and writer, Fred Ladd, it began marketing Soviet Russian animated films from the 1940s and 50s, especially those of the famous Soyuzmultfilm studios (well-known titles included The Firebird, The Frog Prince, Beauty & the Beast, The Space Explorers, and Twelve Months). The films were dubbed, sometimes re-titled, partitioned into chapters and distributed to TV stations.

He also released a partly re-filmed version of the Czech stop-motion animated feature Cesta do pravěku (Karel Zeman, 1955), replacing the opening and closing scenes with new footage and marketing it as Journey to the Beginning of Time. These films proved popular both as features and as TV episodes. Many additional cartoons and natural history films produced by Cayton were marketed under the names "Cartoon Classics", "Animatoons", and "Jungle." Cayton is also credited with reviving professional pool on television in 1977, producing showcase events which included, among others, the legendary Minnesota Fats - Willie Mosconi title matches.

== Tyson vs. Cayton lawsuit ==
Beginning in 1988, following the death of Jim Jacobs, Mike Tyson wanted to replace Cayton with Don King, twice suing Cayton to end their professional relationship. The matter was settled out-of-court. A decade later, Tyson also sued Don King, seeking $100 million in damages; they settled out-of-court for $14 million.

== Legacy ==
Cayton was inducted into the International Boxing Hall of Fame in 2005.
