= Hard pop =

Hard pop may refer to:

- Easycore
- Glam metal
- Kawaii metal
- Pop metal
- Pop punk
- Pop rock
- Power pop

== See also ==
- Hard music (disambiguation)
- Hard rock (disambiguation)
- New Wave (disambiguation)
- Synth-pop
