= Soft Rock =

Soft rock is a music genre derived from pop and rock music.

Soft Rock may refer to:

- Soft Rock, an album by Lifter Puller, 2002
- Soft Rock, an album by Thy Slaughter, 2023
- "Soft Rock", a song by Cxloe, 2021
- "Soft Rock", a song by Mylo from the limited edition of Destroy Rock & Roll, 2005

== Other uses ==
- Chalk, a soft rock mineral
- "Soft/Rock", a 2001 song by Lemon Jelly
- Underground soft-rock mining, a group of underground mining techniques used to extract minerals

== See also ==
- Hard Rock (disambiguation)
