= Bernard Evslin =

American author

- Born: April 4, 1922; New Rochelle, New York, US
- Died: June 4, 1993 (aged 71); Kauaʻi, Hawaii, US
- Occupation: author

Bernard Evslin (April 4, 1922 – June 4, 1993) was an American author best known for his adaptations of Greek mythology.

== Biography ==
Bernard Evslin was born in New Rochelle, New York, April 4, 1922, and went on to attend Rutgers University.

Evslin spent the first part of his career as a playwright and screenwriter. His comedy, The Geranium Hat, opened on Broadway in 1959 and was generally well received, although his later play, Step on a Crack only held one performance before closing at the Ethel Barrymore Theater, despite starring Rita Hayworth. Evslin also wrote the screenplay for A.k.a. Cassius Clay and co-wrote the screenplay for Journey Back to Oz. In the 1960s, he switched gears to novels and short stories, the best-known of which is "Heroes, Gods and Monsters of the Greek Myths" which has been translated into multiple languages and sold over ten million copies across the globe. Evslin went on to author over seventy titles overall, almost half of which were geared at young adults.

Evslin won many awards for his writing, including the National Education Association Award in 1961, National Education Award nomination in 1975, best television documentary on an Educational Theme Award, and the Washington Irving Children's Book Choice Award from the Westchester Library Association for his book Hercules in 1968.

He was married to author and teacher Dorothy Evslin, with whom he co-wrote two of his mythology books, The Greek Gods and Heroes & Monsters of Greek Myth alongside Ned Hoopes. Together, they had four children: Lee, who resides in Hawaii, and Tom, the former Chief Technology Officer of the State of Vermont and CEO of ITXC corporation, who lives in Seattle, as well as two daughters, Pamela and Janet.

== Death ==
Evslin died of cardiac arrest while in his swimming pool on June 4, 1993, in Kauaʻi, Hawaii, at the age of 71.

== Additional works ==
Evslin's Monsters of Mythology series, published between 1987 and 1991, retold many stories from ancient mythology, often by altering the plot of the stories.

The titles include:

- The Adventures of Ulysses
- Anteus
- Amycus
- The Calydonian Boar
- Cerberus
- The Chimaera
- The Cyclopes
- Drabne of Dole
- The Dragon of Boetia
- Fafnir
- Fenris
- The Furies
- Geryon
- Harpalyce
- Hecate
- The Hydra
- Ladon
- Medusa
- The Minotaur
- The Nemean Lion
- Pig's Ploughman
- Procrustes
- Scylla and Charybdis
- The Sirens
- The Spear-Birds
- The Sphinx
