= Legendary Champions =

- Directed by: Harry Chapin
- Written by: Harry Chapin
- Produced by: Bill Cayton; Ross Greenburg
- Narrated by: Norman Rose
- Production company: Turn of the Century Fights
- Distributed by: Marvin Films
- Release date: 1968
- Running time: 77 minutes
- Country: United States
- Language: English

Legendary Champions is a 1968 documentary film written and directed by Harry Chapin for boxing promoter Bill Cayton's The Big Fights Inc. production company which features legendary boxers in action. Some famed and pioneering boxers were also filmed in scenes set outside of the ring, many of which are unique, including several early boxers; John L. Sullivan, for example, is shown in the only film ever taken of him.

== Depiction of Jack Johnson ==
The documentary includes a history of Jack Johnson out of the ring. The narrator states that Johnson is seen picking a defeated boxer's teeth out of one of his gloves. The film of the Dempsey-Willard fight is very violent. Attire worn by some of the early boxers is more revealing than what modern-day boxers use and, at the other extreme, tights were also worn by some boxers.

== Award nomination ==
The film was nominated for an Academy Award for Best Documentary Feature.

== See also ==
- List of American films of 1968
- List of boxing films
