= Jack Johnson (album) =

1971 studio album / soundtrack album by Miles Davis

- Original LP (Columbia S 30455)

Studio album / Soundtrack album by Miles Davis
- Released: February 24, 1971
- Recorded: February 18 and April 7, 1970
- Studio: 30th Street (New York)
- Genres: Jazz-rock; hard rock; funk
- Length: 52:26
- Label: Columbia
- Producer: Teo Macero

Miles Davis chronology
Miles Davis at Fillmore (1970)	Jack Johnson (1971)	Live-Evil (1971)

Alternate cover
- Subsequent reissues

Jack Johnson (also known as A Tribute to Jack Johnson on reissues) is a studio album and soundtrack by the American jazz trumpeter, composer, and bandleader Miles Davis. It was released on February 24, 1971, by Columbia Records.

The album was conceived by Davis for Bill Cayton's documentary of the same name, on the life of boxer Jack Johnson. Its two 25-minute-plus tracks were produced from recordings made on February 18 and April 7, 1970, at 30th Street Studio in New York City. Davis was inspired by the political and racial subtext of Johnson's saga as well as the hard rock and funk sounds of his own era, leading a rock-inspired line-up of musicians in the studio: guitarists John McLaughlin and Sonny Sharrock, keyboardists Herbie Hancock and Chick Corea, saxophonist Steve Grossman, bass clarinetist Bennie Maupin, electric bassist Michael Henderson, and drummers Jack DeJohnette and Billy Cobham.

Jack Johnson performed modestly on the record charts and was generally well received by contemporary critics. It has since been regarded as one of the best albums from Davis' career and the jazz-rock genre, as well as his most overt venture into rock music. In 2003, the original album was reissued as part of The Complete Jack Johnson Sessions, a five-disc box set featuring previously unreleased music from the recording sessions.

== Background ==
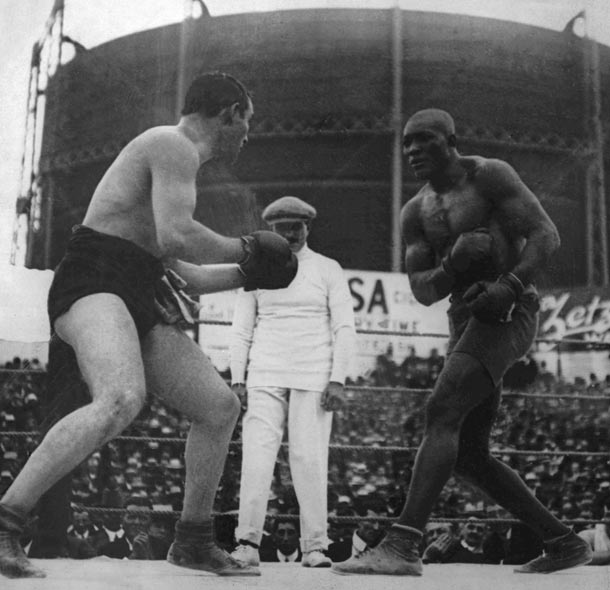
Jack Johnson (right) fighting Tommy Burns for the World Heavyweight Championship in 1908

In 1970, Davis was asked by boxing promoter Bill Cayton to record music for a documentary he was producing, on the life of boxer Jack Johnson. Johnson's saga resonated personally with the musician, who wrote in the album's liner notes of Johnson's mastery as a boxer, his affinity for fast cars, jazz, clothes, and beautiful women, his unreconstructed blackness, and his threatening image of large black manhood to white men. The resulting album, Jack Johnson, was the second film score Davis had composed, after Ascenseur pour l'échafaud in 1957.

== Recording and production ==
The music recorded for Jack Johnson reflected Davis' interest in the eclectic jazz fusion of the time while foreshadowing the hard-edged funk that would fascinate him in the next few years. Having wanted to put together what he called "the greatest rock and roll band you have ever heard", Davis played with a line-up featuring guitarists John McLaughlin and Sonny Sharrock, keyboardists Herbie Hancock and Chick Corea, saxophonist Steve Grossman, bass clarinetist Bennie Maupin, and drummers Jack DeJohnette and Billy Cobham. The album's two tracks were mainly drawn from one session on April 7, 1970, which producer Teo Macero edited together with Davis's recordings from a February 1970 session.

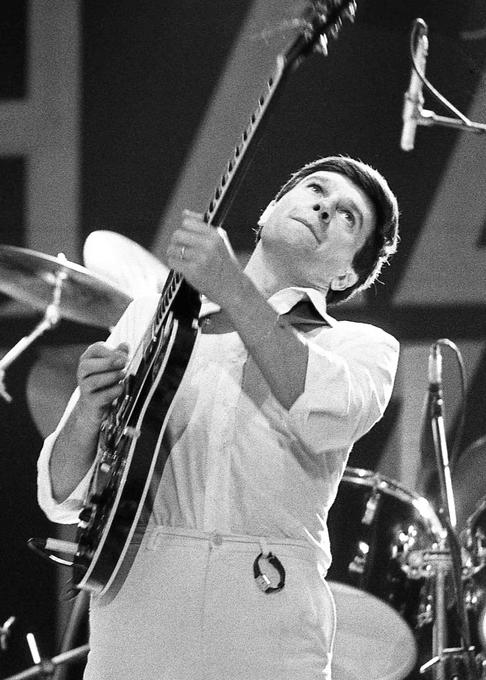
According to Robert Christgau, the recording was the "definitive showcase" for guitarist John McLaughlin (photographed in 1978).

The first track, "Right Off", was constructed from several takes and a solo Davis had recorded in November 1969. It also contains a riff based on Sly and the Family Stone's "Sing a Simple Song", most prominently at 18:44. Much of the track "Yesternow" is built around a slightly modified version of the bassline from the James Brown song "Say It Loud – I'm Black and I'm Proud".

"Right Off" comprises a series of improvisations based on a B♭ chord, but changes after about 20 minutes to an E chord. "Yesternow" has a similar B♭ ostinato and shifts to C minor. It concludes with a voiceover by actor Brock Peters: "I'm Jack Johnson, heavyweight champion of the world. I'm black. They never let me forget it. I'm black all right. I'll never let them forget it." Liner notes accompanying a later release of the album provide a description of the music:

Michael Henderson launches into an enormous boogie groove with Billy Cobham and John McLaughlin. Miles immediately leaves the control room to join in with them. He achieved exactly what he wanted for the soundtrack by creating the effect of a train going at full speed (which he compared to the force of a boxer). By chance, Herbie Hancock had arrived unexpectedly and started playing on a cheap keyboard that a sound engineer quickly connected.

According to The Guardian's Tim Cumming, Jack Johnson abandoned jazz and the broad textures of Bitches Brew in favor of a concerted take on hard rock and funk, inspired as well by politics, the black power movement, and boxing. "[Davis] had a trainer who travelled with the band", Holland recalled. "He used to go to the gym every day. He was in his 40s, and that's prime time for musicians, when you're strong and all your faculties are there. He was playing incredibly." Ken McLeod, an associate professor of music history and culture at the University of Toronto, later said the bassline featured on "Yesternow" (and adapted from James Brown's "Say It Loud—I'm Black and I'm Proud") is "potentially a deliberate allusion to the song's black power theme as it relates to the film's subject. That Davis was so influenced by boxing is also overtly manifest in the titles of pieces named after fighters that were recorded at several of the sessions, both before and after those that resulted in Jack Johnson. Such pieces include 'Johnny Bratton,' 'Archie Moore,' 'Duran,' 'Sugar Ray,' and 'Ali.'"

== Release and reception ==
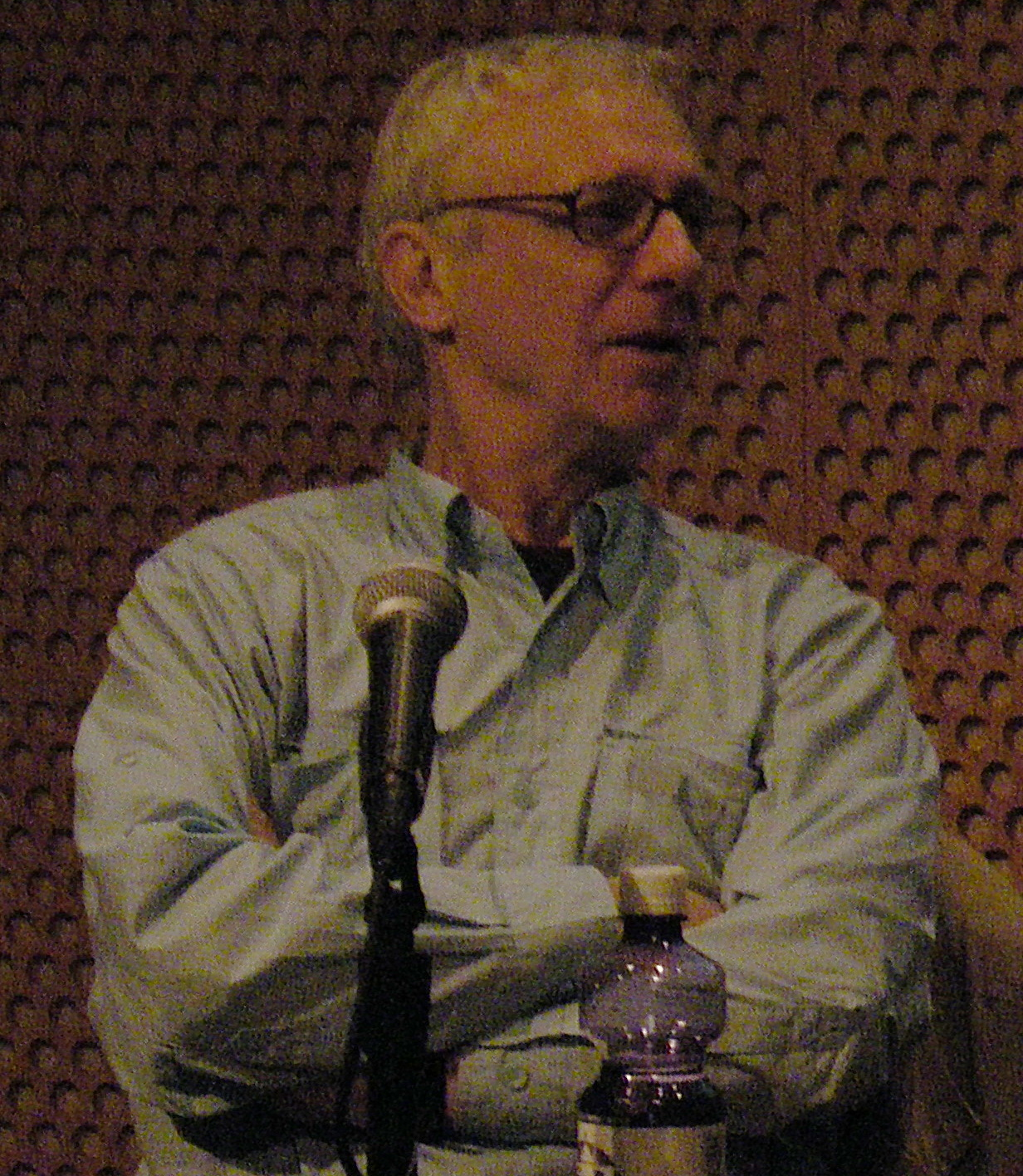
"Jack Johnson is a record I adored from the git, an eccentric call at the time" (Christgau, 2018)

Jack Johnson was released on February 24, 1971, by Columbia Records to some commercial success—peaking at number four on Billboard magazine's jazz chart and at number 47 on the R&B chart—despite little marketing from the label. According to Davis, the record was originally released with the wrong cover: a depiction of Johnson in his car, illustrated in stylized period fashion. The intended cover—a photo of Davis playing trumpet in a bent-backward stance—was used on subsequent pressings, which were titled A Tribute to Jack Johnson. In 2003, the album was included on The Complete Jack Johnson Sessions, a five-disc box set featuring previously unreleased music from the original recording sessions.

Reviewing the album in June 1971 for The Village Voice, rock critic Robert Christgau gave Jack Johnson an A-plus and said it is his favorite recording from Davis since Milestones (1958) and Kind of Blue (1959). While finding it lacking in the excitement of the best moments from Bitches Brew, Christgau believed the album coalesces its predecessor's "flashy ideas" into "one brilliant illumination." Steve Starger of The Hartford Courant called the album "magnificent" and "another gem" in Davis' 20-year "string of gems", and wrote that the tracks "really make up one long, churning, steaming, brooding, slashing musical experience that never dips below the highest of art." Starger found the sidemen's performances masterful and said that Peters' voiceover at the end gives "Johnson's words frightening majesty".

Less enthusiastic about the record was jazz musician and journalist Leonard Feather, who wrote a review for the Los Angeles Times titled "Miles Ahead and Miles Behind". Viewing Jack Johnson as a "letdown after the unflawed triumph" of Bitches Brew, Feather was particularly dismayed by Davis for aligning himself with "the thumping, clinking, whomping battering ram that passes for a rhythm section" on the album.

== Legacy and reappraisal ==
Retrospective professional reviews
Review scores
Source	Rating
AllMusic	5/5 stars
Blender	5/5 stars
Boston Herald	4/4 stars
Christgau's Record Guide	A+
DownBeat	4.5/5 stars
The Encyclopedia of Popular Music	4/5 stars
The Guardian	5/5 stars
MusicHound Jazz	4.5/5 stars
The Penguin Guide to Jazz	4/4 stars
The Rolling Stone Album Guide	5/5 stars

Jack Johnson was a turning point in Davis' career and has since been viewed as one of his greatest works. According to JazzTimes, while his 1970 album Bitches Brew had helped spark the fusion of jazz and rock in the music scene, Jack Johnson was the trumpeter's most brazen and effective venture into rock, "the one that blew the fusion floodgates wide open, launching a whole new genre in its wake". According to McLaughlin, Davis considered it to be his best jazz-rock album. In The Penguin Guide to Jazz (2006), Richard Cook says Jack Johnson "stands at the head of what was to be Miles Davis's most difficult decade, artistically and personally", while Tom Hull names it one of the "true highlights" of the trumpeter's electric period and among his best albums. The Boston Herald cites it as one of Davis' "last truly great albums" and as "some of the most powerful and influential jazz-rock ever played."

Critics in retrospective appraisals also note the uniqueness of Davis' playing and the crucial contributions of his band and producer on the album. AllMusic's Thom Jurek highlights its "funky, dirty rock & roll jazz" and "chilling, overall high-energy rockist stance". He also calls it "the purest electric jazz record ever made because of the feeling of spontaneity and freedom it evokes in the listener, for the stellar and inspiring solos by McLaughlin and Davis that blur all edges between the two musics, and for the tireless perfection of the studio assemblage by Miles and producer Macero". John Fordham from The Guardian observes a transition in Davis's playing from a "whispering electric sound to some of the most trenchantly responsive straight-horn improvising he ever put on disc". According to Fordham:

Considering that it began as a jam between three bored Miles Davis sidemen, and that the eventual 1971 release was stitched together from a variety of takes, it's a miracle that this album turned out to be one of the most remarkable jazz-rock discs of the era. Columbia didn't even realise what it had with these sessions, and the mid-decade Miles albums that followed – angled toward the pop audience – were far more aggressively marketed than the Jack Johnson set ... Of course, it's a much starker, less subtly textured setting than Bitches Brew, but in the early jazz-rock hall of fame, it's up there on the top pedestal.

Jack Johnson and Davis' other electric-period albums influenced rock musician Iggy Pop's early music with the Stooges. Its influence continued into his later career, when in the mid-1980s he purchased copies of Davis' Sketches of Spain (1960) and Jack Johnson in a no frills used record shop for less than $5. "They have been my inspiring companions ever since", he told The Quietus in 2010 while naming them his favorite Davis records. "The one tears me apart and the other puts me back together."

== Track listing ==
All songs were composed by Miles Davis.

Side one
No.	Title	Length
1.	"Right Off"	26:53

Side two
No.	Title	Length
1.	"Yesternow"	25:34
Total length:		52:27

== Personnel ==
The information below is taken from Sony Music's milesdavis.com.

The following lineup was recorded at Columbia Studios, New York, April 7, 1970:

- Miles Davis – trumpet
- Steve Grossman – soprano saxophone
- John McLaughlin – electric guitar
- Herbie Hancock – organ
- Michael Henderson – electric bass
- Billy Cobham – drums
- Brock Peters – narration

Additionally, the following participants were credited for roles outside the band:

- Teo Macero – conduction of "unknown orchestra", production
- Stan Tonkel – engineering
- Miles Davis – compositions

The following lineup, recorded at Columbia Studios, February 18, 1970, was uncredited on the original LP and are only heard on a section of "Yesternow" (from 14:00 to 23:55) playing a composition called "Willie Nelson":

- Miles Davis – trumpet
- Bennie Maupin – bass clarinet
- John McLaughlin – electric guitar
- Sonny Sharrock – electric guitar
- Chick Corea – electric piano
- Dave Holland – electric bass
- Jack DeJohnette – drums

== Charts ==
Chart (1971)	Peak position
U.S. Billboard 200	159
U.S. Jazz Albums (Billboard)	4
U.S. R&B Albums (Billboard)	47

== Bibliography ==
- Considine, J. D.; et al. (November 2, 2004). Brackett, Nathan; Hoard, Christian (eds.). The New Rolling Stone Album Guide: Completely Revised and Updated 4th Edition. Simon & Schuster. ISBN 0-7432-0169-8.
- Cook, Richard; Morton, Brian (2006). The Penguin Guide to Jazz Recordings (8th ed.). Penguin Books. ISBN 0141023279.
- Szwed, John F. (2002). So What: The Life of Miles Davis. Simon & Schuster. ISBN 0684859823.
- Tingen, Paul (2001). Miles Beyond: The Electric Explorations of Miles Davis, 1967–1991. Billboard Books. ISBN 0823083462.
