= A.k.a. Cassius Clay =

1970 film

a.k.a. Cassius Clay
- Theatrical release poster
- Directed by: Jimmy Jacobs
- Written by: Bernard Evslin
- Produced by: Bill Cayton
- Starring: Muhammad Ali; Cus D'Amato; Richard Kiley (narrator)
- Cinematography: Isidore Mankofsky
- Edited by: Edward P. Bartsch
- Music by: Teo Macero
- Production companies: Sports of the Century, William Cayton Productions
- Distributed by: United Artists
- Release date: November 4, 1970 (U.S.)
- Running time: 79 minutes
- Country: United States
- Language: English

A.k.a. Cassius Clay (styled as a.k.a. Cassius Clay) is a 1970 boxing documentary film about the former heavyweight champion Muhammad Ali.

Directed by Jimmy Jacobs, the film was made during Ali's exile from the sport for refusing to be inducted into the US Army on religious grounds. Narrated by Richard Kiley, the film gives an overview of Ali's career to that point. The film features archival footage of people associated with Ali, such as Angelo Dundee, Malcolm X, and Drew Bundini Brown, and clips of his fights with Sonny Liston, Henry Cooper, George Chuvalo and Floyd Patterson. These are intercut with scenes featuring Ali and veteran boxing trainer Cus D'Amato discussing his career and how he would have fared against past champions such as Joe Louis.

== Reception ==
The film opened at number two at the US box office behind Sunflower with a gross of $277,500 from 55 theaters.
