= Hard Rock (disambiguation) =

Hard rock is a subgenre of rock music.

Hard rock or Hard Rock may also refer to:

== Brands and enterprises ==
- Hard Rock International, an American conglomerate owned by the Seminole Tribe of Florida
  - Hard Rock Hotel and Casino
  - Hard Rock Cafe
- The Rockin' Life, Indonesian radio network formerly known as Hard Rock FM

== Sports ==
- Hard Rock FC, a Grenadian football club that competes in the Grenadian Premier Division league
- Hardrock Hundred Mile Endurance Run, or "Hardrock 100", a long-distance endurance run in Colorado
- Hard Rock Stadium, a stadium in Miami, Florida

== Other uses ==
- Hard Rock, a DC Comics character
- Hard rock mining, mining of metals and other hard minerals
- Hard ROCK!, a difficulty level in the 2006 rhythm video game Elite Beat Agents
- Hard Rock (exercise), a planned 1982 British civil defence exercise
- Hard Rock, Arizona, a census designated place

== See also ==
- Hard music (disambiguation)
- Heavy rock (disambiguation)
- Soft Rock (disambiguation)
