= Jack Johnson =

American boxer (1878–1946)

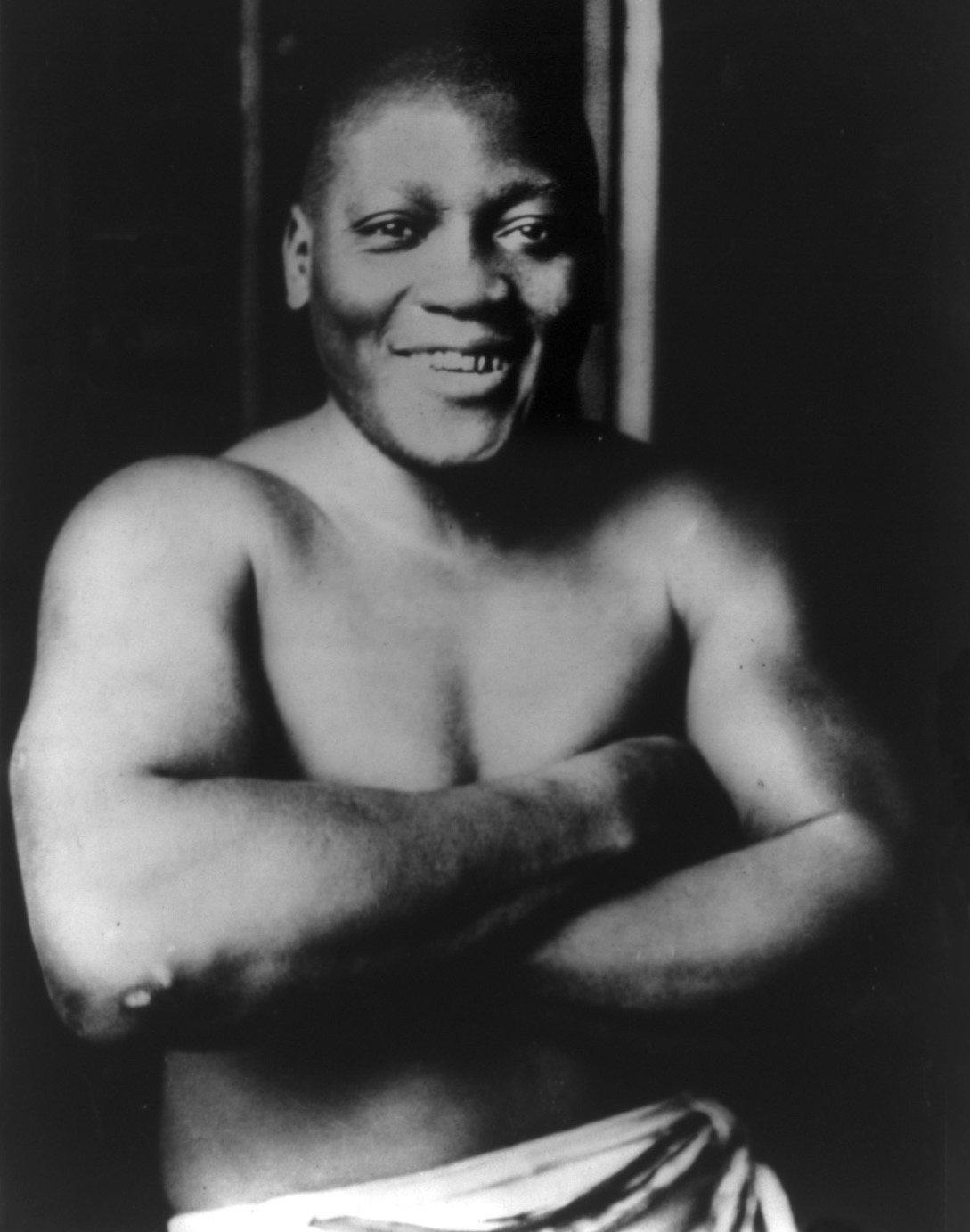
- Johnson in 1915

Personal information
- Nickname: Galveston Giant
- Born: John Arthur Johnson; March 31, 1878 Galveston, Texas, U.S.
- Died: June 10, 1946 (aged 68) Franklinton, North Carolina, U.S.
- Height: 6 ft 0 1/2 in (1.84 m)
- Weight: Heavyweight

Boxing career
- Reach: 75 in (191 cm)
- Stance: Orthodox

Boxing record
- Total fights: 94
- Wins: 69
- Win by KO: 34
- Losses: 11
- Draws: 10
- No contests: 4

John Arthur Johnson (March 31, 1878 – June 10, 1946), nicknamed the "Galveston Giant", was an American boxer who, at the height of the Jim Crow era, became the first black world heavyweight boxing champion (1908–1915). His 1910 fight against James J. Jeffries was dubbed the "fight of the century". Johnson defeated Jeffries, who was white, triggering dozens of race riots across the U.S. According to filmmaker Ken Burns, "for more than thirteen years, Jack Johnson was the most famous and the most notorious African American on Earth". He is widely regarded as one of the most influential boxers in history.

In 1912, Johnson opened a successful and luxurious "black and tan" (desegregated) restaurant and nightclub in Chicago, which in part was run by his wife, a white woman. Major newspapers of the time soon claimed that Johnson was attacked by the federal government only after he became famous as a black man married to a white woman, and was linked to other white women. Johnson was arrested on charges of violating the federal Mann Act—forbidding one to transport a woman across state lines for "immoral purposes"—a racially motivated charge that embroiled him in controversy for his relationships, including marriages. Sentenced to a year in prison, Johnson fled the country and fought boxing matches abroad for seven years until 1920, when he served his sentence at the federal penitentiary at Leavenworth.

Johnson continued taking paying fights for many years, and operated several other businesses, including lucrative endorsement deals. He died in a car crash in 1946 at the age of 68. In 2018, Johnson was posthumously pardoned by U.S. President Donald Trump.

== Early life ==
Born on March 31, 1878, Johnson grew up in Galveston, Texas. He was the third child and eldest son among nine children born to Henry and Tina ("Tiny") Johnson, both formerly enslaved. Henry, who was disabled while serving in the Union's 38th Colored Infantry as a civilian teamster, worked as a janitor while Tiny took in washing.

As a youth, Johnson associated with the racially integrated 11th Street and Avenue K gang, though he later wrote in his 1927 autobiography that he did not engage in fights before the age of 12. Remembering his childhood, Johnson said: "As I grew up, the white boys were my friends and my pals. I ate with them, played with them and slept at their homes. Their mothers gave me cookies, and I ate at their tables. No one ever taught me that white men were superior to me." Although a segregated high school for Black students was available to him, Johnson did not enroll. Instead, he entered the workforce to contribute to his family's income. He held a series of jobs, including cleaning a barbershop, working as a porter in a gambling parlor, and assisting a baker. For a time, he traveled to Dallas in search of employment and apprenticed with a carriage painter. It was there that the shop's owner, Walter Lewis, first introduced him to the sport of boxing.

Johnson later said that he left home again at age 16. According to his account, he traveled to Manhattan to meet Steve Brodie, the Irish immigrant who claimed to have survived a jump from the newly completed Brooklyn Bridge in 1886. He reportedly then went on to Boston to see another of his heroes, Barbados Joe Walcott, a welterweight fighter from the West Indies. Afterward, Johnson returned to the Texas Gulf Coast and worked as a janitor, a stableboy, a hotel porter and a longshoreman. At one point, he got a job cleaning a gym and saved up enough money to buy a pair of boxing gloves. In the summer of 1895, he took part in his first significant bout, facing fellow dockworker John Lee on the beach. Johnson won both the match and the $1.50 prize. Later that summer, when professional boxer Bob Thompson offered $25 to anyone who could last four rounds with him in Galveston, Johnson accepted the challenge. He completed the four rounds but later described the prize money as "the hardest earned money of my life."

== Boxing career ==
Johnson made his debut as a professional boxer on November 1, 1898, in Galveston, when he knocked out Charley Brooks in the second round of a 15-round bout. This victory gave him the Texas state middleweight title.

In 1899, Johnson traveled to Chicago and began winning "battle royals", in which a half dozen or more young black men were gloved, blindfolded, and pushed into a ring where they were forced to flail at each other until only one remained standing. Johnson was the last man standing, and won $1.50, which he had to turn over to the white "manager" who had gotten him the fight. His performance attracted the attention of promoter Jack Curley and P.J. "Paddy" Carroll, who arranged for him to face Black heavyweight John "Klondike" Haynes. Johnson lost that bout in May 1899 after retiring in the fifth round. In January 1901, Carroll organized a rematch between Johnson and Klondike in Memphis. Johnson battered Klondike badly enough that he quit in the 14th round.

=== Johnson vs. Choynski ===
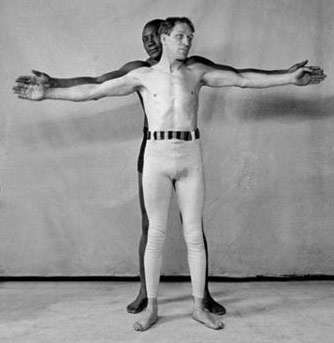
Johnson standing behind Choynski in Chicago in 1909

On February 25, 1901, Johnson fought Joe Choynski at Harmony Hall in Galveston, Texas. Choynski, a popular and experienced heavyweight, knocked out Johnson in the third round. As Johnson lay dazed on the canvas, authorities, including the Texas Rangers, intervened, and both fighters were arrested for participating in an illegal prizefight. They spent 23 days in jail, during which Sheriff Henry Thomas permitted spectators to gather outside and observe the men sparring. A grand jury declined to issue indictments, and the sheriff released both men on the condition that they leave town.

Johnson attested that his success in boxing came from the coaching he received from Choynski. The aging Choynski saw natural talent and determination in Johnson and taught him the nuances of defense, stating: "A man who can move like you should never have to take a punch".

=== World colored heavyweight champion ===
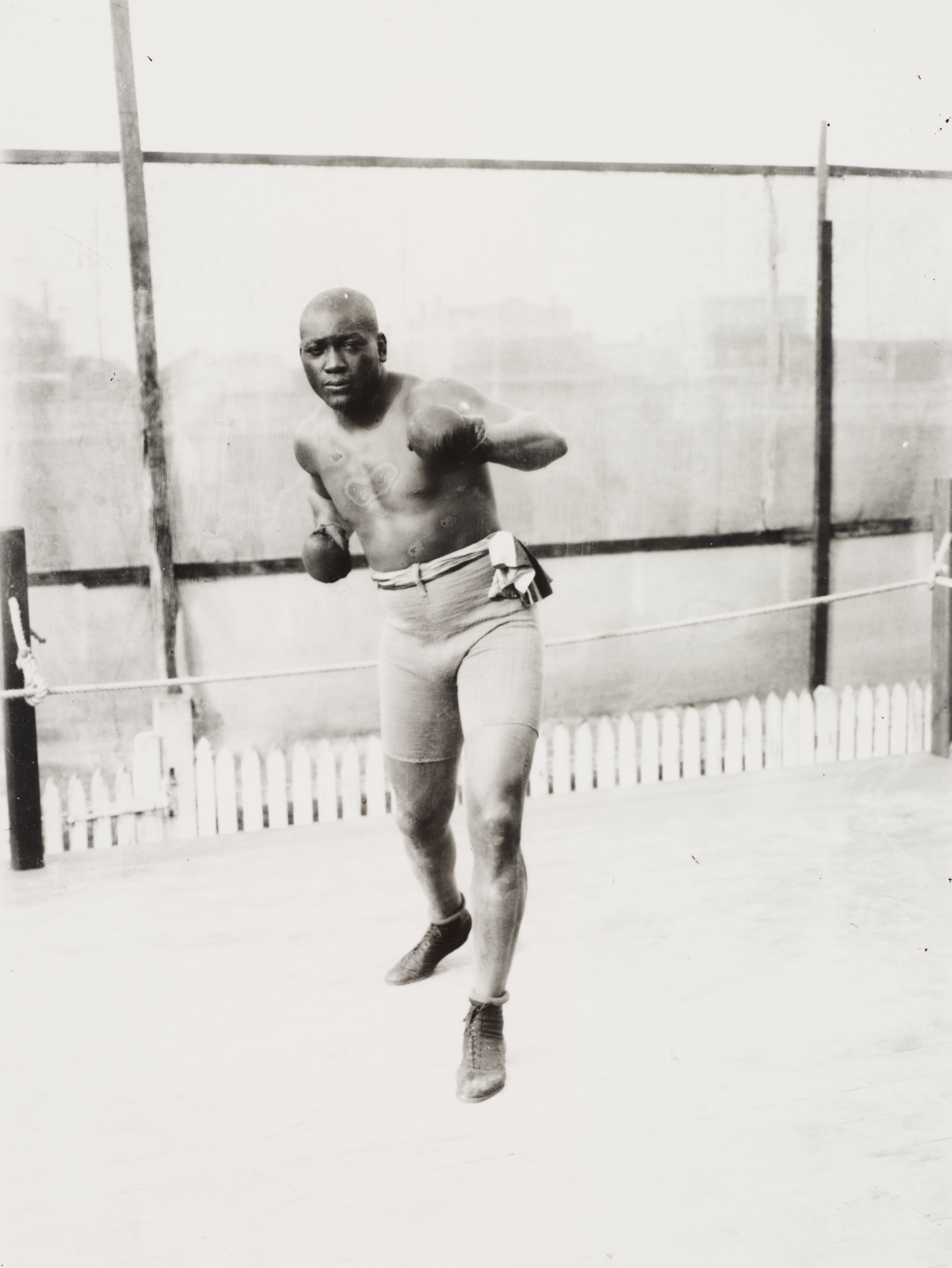
Jack Johnson, Sydney, c. 1908

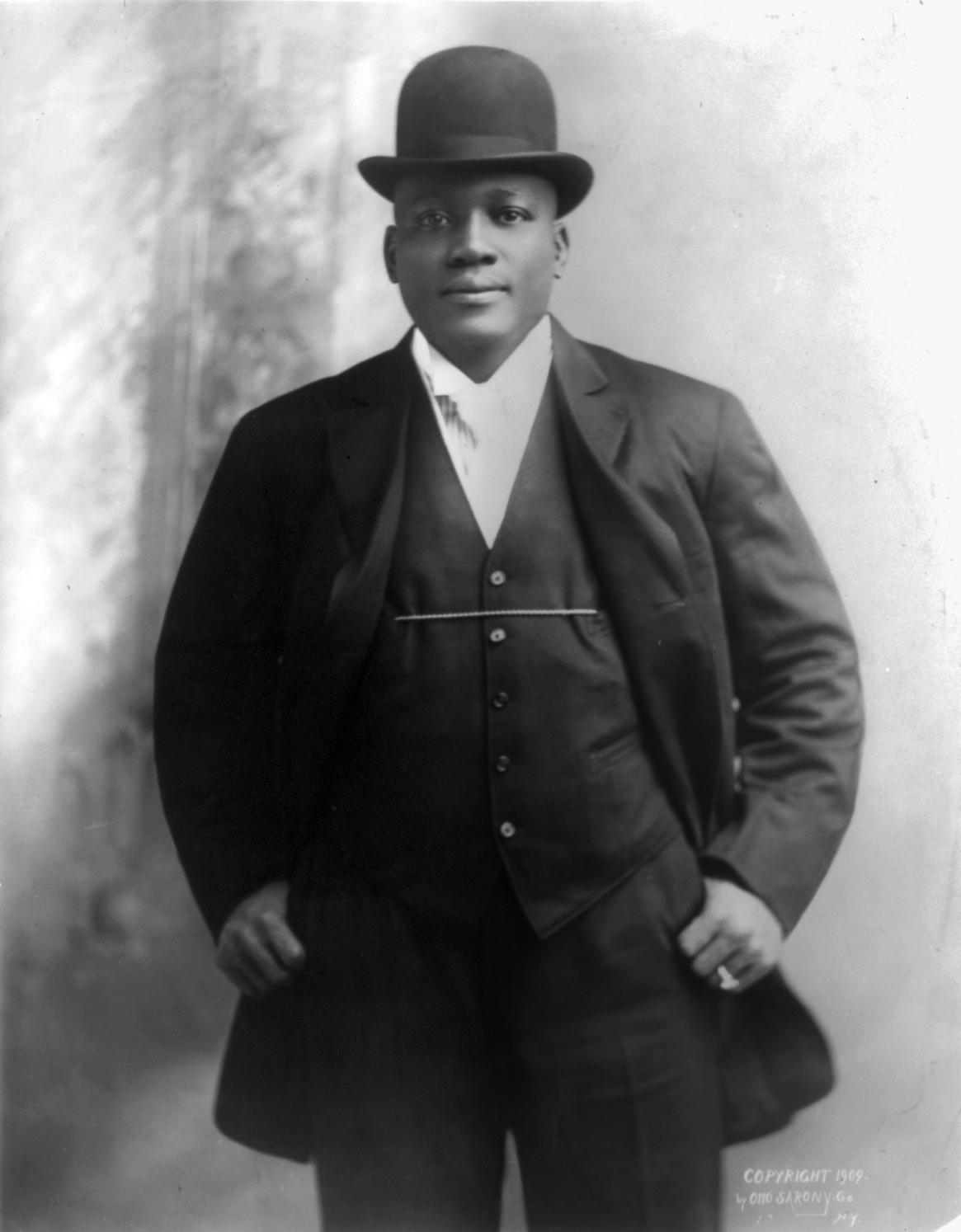
Johnson in 1908 (photograph by Otto Sarony)

On February 5, 1903, at Hazard's Pavilion in Los Angeles, Johnson won a 20-round decision over Denver Ed Martin for the World Colored Heavyweight Championship, which he defended four times in the next two years. By the end of 1903, the Los Angeles Times declared that "Jack Johnson is now the logical opponent for Champion Jeffries.... The color line gag does not go now."

==== Johnson vs. Jeanette & Langford ====
Johnson and Joe Jeanette fought frequently between 1905 and 1908, with Johnson dominating their official matchups before winning the world heavyweight title. Often referred to as part of the "Black Heavyweight" era, they fought 7–10 times (sources vary on exact number of "no-decision" matches). After winning the heavyweight title in 1908, Johnson refused to fight Jeanette again, despite numerous challenges.

Johnson fought Sam Langford once, on April 26, 1906, at the Lincoln Athletic Club in Chelsea, Massachusetts. Johnson, who outweighed Langford by 35 pounds, won easily, breaking Langford's nose and cutting his lip. Johnson said later that he had prolonged the match to 15 rounds at the request of the ring's management. Once Johnson won the heavyweight championship, he refused to give Langford a chance at the title.

=== World heavyweight champion ===
At the time, the heavyweight boxing champion was widely regarded as an embodiment of ideal masculinity. The prospect of an African American holding the title challenged prevailing beliefs in white superiority. Because boxing was one of the most popular sports of the era—alongside baseball and horse racing—the champion attracted significant public attention. Many white Americans opposed the idea of a Black champion receiving such prominence after defeating white opponents. As a result, Johnson encountered substantial obstacles in securing a bout with the reigning heavyweight champion.

In 1904, Johnson issued a challenge to James J. Jeffries, who held the world heavyweight title at the time. However, Jeffries refused to fight an African American and retired instead. Johnson later fought former champion Bob Fitzsimmons in July 1907 and knocked him out in two rounds.

Johnson finally won the world heavyweight title on December 26, 1908, a full six years after lightweight champion Joe Gans became the first African American boxing champion. Johnson's victory over the reigning world champion, Canadian Tommy Burns, at the Sydney Stadium in Australia, came after following Burns around the world for two years and taunting him in the press for a match. Burns agreed to fight Johnson only after promoters guaranteed him $30,000. Burns, who was 24 pounds lighter than the 192-pound Johnson, was practically out on his feet in the 14th round when the police jumped into the ring and stopped the fight in front of over 20,000 spectators. Referee Hugh McIntosh awarded the championship to Johnson.

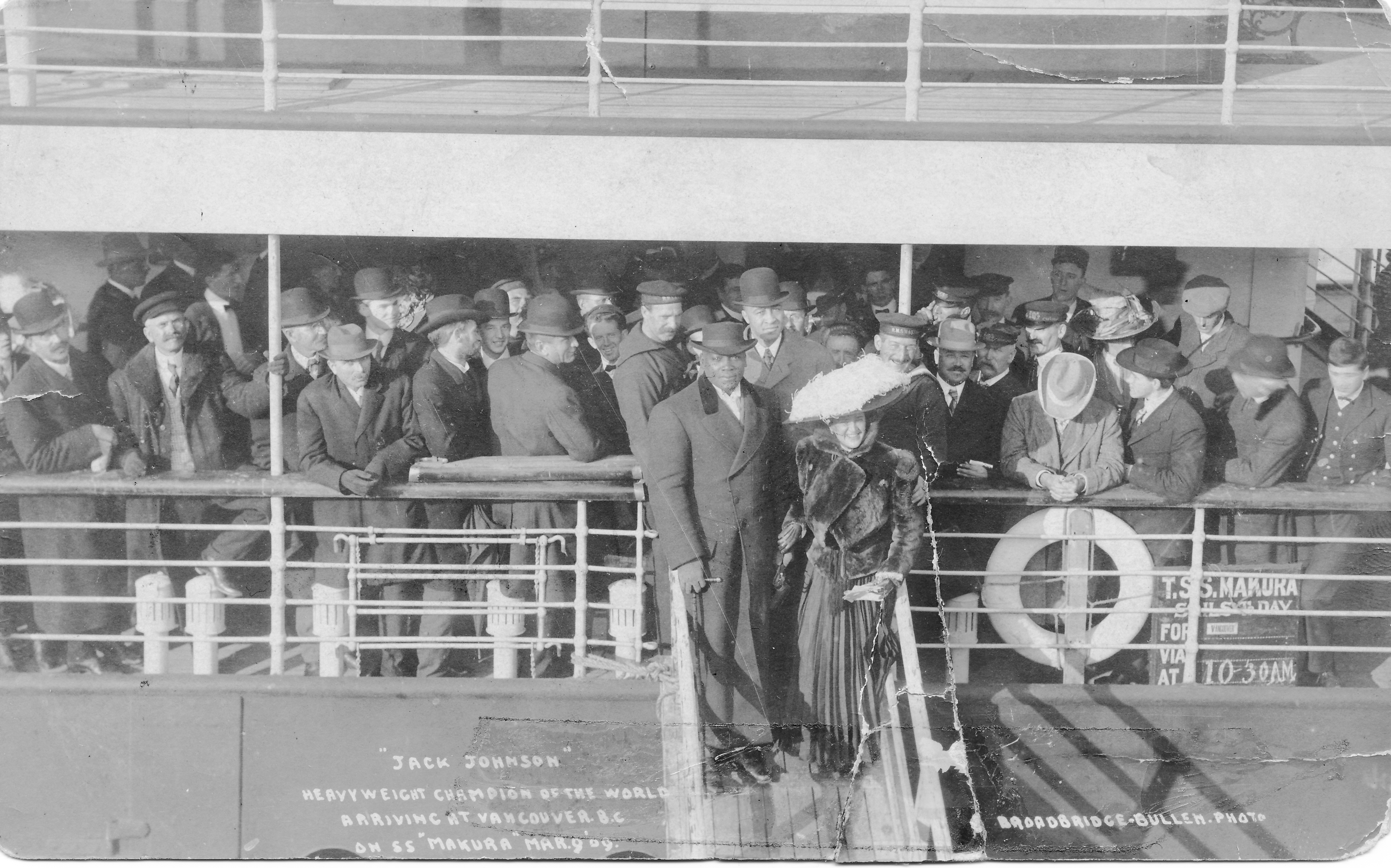
Johnson arriving in Vancouver on March 9, 1909, as the World Heavyweight Champion

After Johnson's victory over Burns, racial animosity among whites ran so deep that some, including renowned American author Jack London, called for a "Great White Hope" to take the title away from Johnson. While Johnson was heavyweight champion, he was covered more in the press than all other notable black men combined. The lead-up to the bout was peppered with racist press against Johnson. An editorial in the New York Times ("Pugilists as Race Champions") expressed a concern that the fight would "have the deplorable effect of intensifying racial antagonisms and of making race problems more difficult of solution":

If the black man wins, thousands and thousands of his ignorant brothers will misinterpret his victory as justifying claims to much more than mere physical equality with their white neighbors. If the negro loses, the members of his race will be taunted and irritated [provoked] because of their champion's downfall.

Johnson refused to keep a low profile in the face of criticism of his color and character, and instead took on an excessively flamboyant lifestyle. He drove flashy yellow sports cars, reputedly walked his pet leopard while sipping champagne, flaunted gold teeth that went with his gold-handled walking stick, and engaged in numerous, overlapping romances with women–all of them white.

As title holder, Johnson thus had to face a series of fighters each billed by boxing promoters as a "great white hope". He fought two exhibitions and three no-decisions before meeting middleweight champ Stanley Ketchel on October 16, 1909. The 205 1/2-pound Johnson knocked out the 170 1/4-pound Ketchel in the 12th round with a devastating right to the jaw, one of the hardest blows ever delivered. Five of the challenger's teeth were ripped off at the roots; Johnson can be seen on film removing them from his glove, where they had been embedded.

=== "Fight of the Century" ===
In 1910, former undefeated heavyweight champion James J. Jeffries came out of retirement to challenge Johnson, saying "I am going into this fight for the sole purpose of proving that a white man is better than a Negro". He had not fought in six years and he also had to lose well over 100 pounds to get back to his championship fighting weight. Efforts to persuade Jeffries to "retrieve the honor of the white race" began immediately after the Burns–Johnson fight. Initially Jeffries had no interest in the fight, being quite happy as an alfalfa farmer. On October 29, 1909, Johnson and Jeffries signed an agreement to "box for the heavyweight championship of the world" and called promoters to bid for the right to orchestrate the event.

In early December 1909, Johnson and Jeffries selected a bid from the nation's top boxing promoters—Tex Rickard and John Gleason. The bid guaranteed a purse of $101,000 (equivalent to $3,619,000 in 2025) to be divided 75 percent to the winner and 25 percent to the loser, as well as two-thirds of the revenues collected from the sales of the right to film the fight (each boxer received one third of the equity rights). Although it was well understood that a victory for Jeffries was likely to be more profitable than a victory for Johnson, there were no doubts that either way the event would produce record profits. Legal historian Barak Orbach argues that in "an industry that promoted events through the dramatization of rivalries, a championship contest between an iconic representative of the white race and the most notorious [black fighter] was a gold mine".

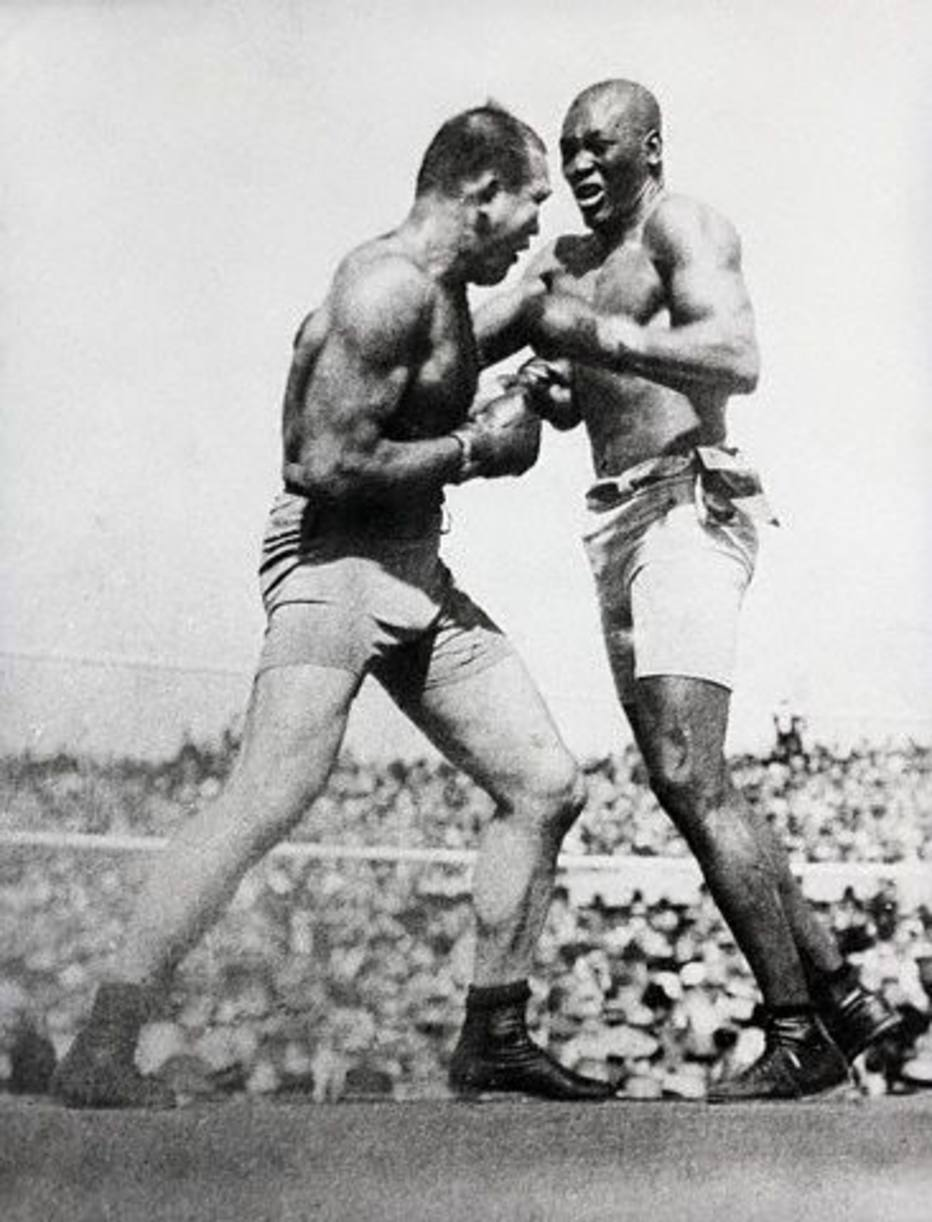
James J. Jeffries fights Johnson in 1910

Jeffries mostly remained hidden from media attention until the day of the fight, while Johnson soaked up the spotlight. John L. Sullivan, who made boxing championships a popular and esteemed spectacle, stated that Johnson was in such good physical shape compared to Jeffries that he would only lose if he had a lack of skill on the day of the fight. Before the fight, Jeffries remarked, "It is my intention to go right after my opponent and knock him out as soon as possible." While his wife added, "I'm not interested in prizefighting but I am interested in my husband's welfare, I do hope this will be his last fight." Johnson's words were "May the best man win."

Racial tension was brewing in the lead up to the fight and to prevent any harm from coming to either boxer, guns were prohibited within the arena along with the sale of alcohol and anyone who was under the effects of alcohol. Apples and all other potential weapons were barred. Behind the racial attitudes which were being instigated by the media was a major investment in gambling for the fight, with 10–7 odds in favor of Jeffries.

The fight took place on July 4, 1910, in front of 20,000 people, at a ring which was built just for the occasion in downtown Reno, Nevada. Jeffries proved unable to impose his will on the younger champion and Johnson dominated the fight. By the 15th round, after Jeffries had been knocked down twice for the first time in his career, Jeffries' corner threw in the towel to end the fight and prevent Jeffries from having a knockout on his record.

Johnson later remarked he knew the fight was over in the 4th round when he landed an uppercut and saw the look on Jeffries face, stating, "I knew what that look meant. The old ship was sinking." Afterwards, Jeffries was humbled by the loss and what he had seen of Johnson in their match. "I could never have whipped Johnson at my best," Jeffries said. "I couldn't have hit him. No, I couldn't have reached him in 1,000 years."

The "Fight of the Century" earned Johnson $65,000 (over $2.2 million in 2025 dollars) and silenced the critics, who had belittled Johnson's previous victory over Tommy Burns as "empty", claiming that Burns was a false champion since Jeffries had retired undefeated. John L. Sullivan commented after the fight that Johnson won deservedly, fairly and convincingly,

The fight of the century is over and a black man is the undisputed champion of the world. It was a poor fight as fights go, this less than 15-round affair between James J. Jeffries and Jack Johnson. Scarcely has there ever been a championship contest that was so one-sided. All of Jeffries much-vaunted condition amounted to nothing. He wasn't in it from the first bell tap to the last ... The negro had few friends, but there was little demonstration against him. (Spectators) could not help but admire Johnson because he is the type of prizefighter that is admired by sportsmen. He played fairly at all times and fought fairly. ... What a crafty, powerful, cunning left hand (Johnson) has. He is one of the craftiest, cunningest boxers that ever stepped into the ring. ... They both fought closely all during the 15 rounds. It was just the sort of fight that Jeffries wanted. There was no running or ducking like Corbett did with me in New Orleans (1892). Jeffries did not miss so many blows, because he hardly started any. Johnson was on top of him all the time.... (Johnson) didn't get gay at all with Jeffries in the beginning, and it was always the white man who clinched, but Johnson was very careful, and he backed away and took no chances, and was good-natured with it all ... The best man won, and I was one of the first to congratulate him, and also one of the first to extend my heartfelt sympathy to the beaten man.

==== Riots and aftermath ====
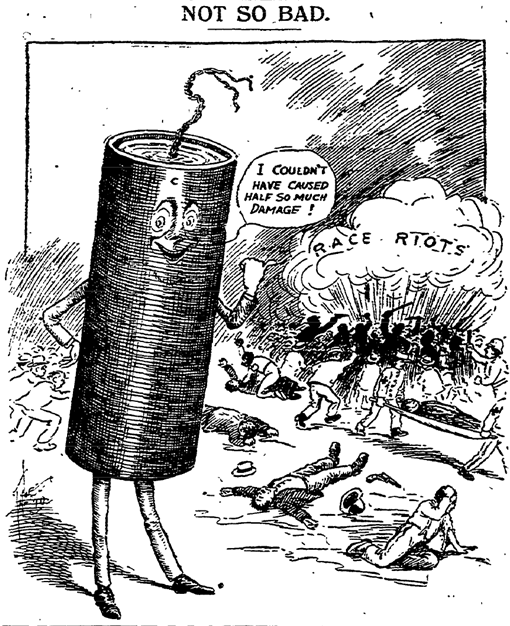
The LA Times noted the explosive nature of Johnson's victory by featuring this cartoon in which a stick of dynamite suggests that it would not have caused as much damage as the riots resulting from the fight did.

The outcome of the fight triggered race riots that evening—the Fourth of July—all across the United States, from Texas and Colorado to New York and Washington, D.C. Johnson's victory over Jeffries had dashed white dreams of finding a "great white hope" to defeat him. Many whites felt humiliated by the defeat of Jeffries.

Black Americans, on the other hand, were jubilant and celebrated Johnson's great victory as a victory for racial advancement. Black poet William Waring Cuney later highlighted the black reaction to the fight in his poem "My Lord, What a Morning".

Race riots erupted in New York, Baltimore, Pittsburgh, Philadelphia, New Orleans, Atlanta, St. Louis, Little Rock and Houston. In all, riots occurred in more than 25 states and 50 cities. At least twenty people were killed in the riots and hundreds more were injured.

==== Film of the bout ====
The Johnson–Jeffries Fight film received more public attention in the United States than any other film to date and for the next five years, until the release of The Birth of a Nation. In the United States, many states and cities banned the exhibition of the Johnson–Jeffries film. The movement to censor Johnson's victory took over the country within three days after the fight.

Two weeks after the match former President Theodore Roosevelt, an avid boxer and fan, wrote an article for The Outlook in which he supported banning not just moving pictures of boxing matches, but a complete ban on all prize fights in the US. He cited the "crookedness" and gambling that surrounded such contests and that moving pictures have "introduced a new method of money getting and of demoralization".

In 2005, the film of the Jeffries–Johnson "Fight of the Century" was entered into the United States National Film Registry as being worthy of preservation.

The six fights for which the major films were made, starring Johnson, were

1. Johnson–Burns, released in 1908
2. Johnson–Ketchel, released in 1909
3. Johnson–Jeffries, released in 1910
4. Johnson–Flynn, released in 1912
5. Johnson–Moran, released in 1914
6. Johnson–Willard, released in 1915

=== Maintaining the Color Bar ===
The color bar remained in effect even under Johnson. Once he was the world's heavyweight champ, Johnson did not fight a black opponent for the first five years of his reign. He denied matches to black heavyweights Joe Jeanette, one of his successors as colored heavyweight champ, Sam Langford, who beat Jeanette for the colored title and the young Harry Wills, who was colored heavyweight champ during the last year of Johnson's reign as world's heavyweight champ.

Black fighters were not given a chance at the title because Johnson maintained that he could make more money fighting White boxers. In August 1913, as Johnson neared the end of his reign as world heavyweight champ, there were rumors that he had agreed to fight Langford in Paris for the title, but it did not happen. Johnson alleged that Langford was unable to raise the $30,000 for his guarantee.

Because Black boxers, with the exception of Johnson, had been barred from fighting for the heavyweight championship, Johnson's refusal to fight African-Americans offended the African-American community, since the opportunity to fight top white boxers was rare. Jeanette criticized Johnson, saying, "Jack forgot about his old friends after he became champion and drew the color line against his own people."

==== Johnson v. Johnson ====
When Johnson finally agreed to take on a Black opponent in late 1913, it was not Sam Langford the current colored heavyweight champion that he gave the title shot to. Instead, Johnson chose to take on Battling Jim Johnson, a lesser-known boxer who in 1910 had lost to Langford and had a draw and loss via KO to Sam McVey, the former colored champ. Battling Jim fought former colored champ Joe Jeanette four times between July 19, 1912, and January 21, 1913, and lost all four fights. The only fighter of note who he did beat during that period was the future Colored champ Big Bill Tate, whom he KO-ed in the second round of a scheduled 10-round bout. It was Tate's third pro fight.

In November 1913, the International Boxing Union had declared the world heavyweight title held by Jack Johnson to be vacant. The fight, scheduled for 10 rounds, was held on December 19, 1913, in Paris. It was the first time in history that two black people had fought for the world heavyweight championship

Jack Johnson, the heavyweight champion, and Battling Jim Johnson, another colored pugilist, of Galveston, Texas, met in a 10-round contest here tonight, which ended in a draw. The spectators loudly protested throughout that the men were not fighting, and demanded their money back. Many of them left the hall. The organizers of the fight explained the fiasco by asserting that Jack Johnson's left arm was broken in the third round. There is no confirmation of a report that Jack Johnson had been stabbed and no evidence at the ringside of such an accident. During the first three rounds he was obviously playing with his opponent. After that it was observed that he was only using his right hand. When the fight was over, he complained that his arm had been injured. Doctors who made an examination, certified to a slight fracture of the radius of the left arm. The general opinion is that his arm was injured in a wrestling match early in the week, and that a blow tonight caused the fracture of the bone.

Because of the draw, Jack Johnson kept his championship. After the fight, he explained that his left arm was injured in the third round and he could not use it.

=== Title loss ===
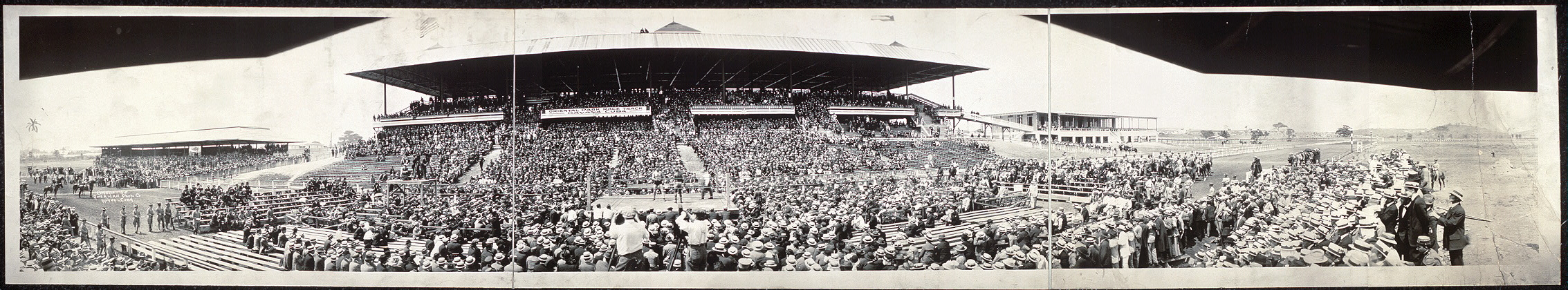
A panorama of the 1915 Willard–Johnson fight in Havana, Cuba

In late 1914, two ambitious promoters—Jack Curley and Harry Frazee—began working to arrange a title fight between Johnson and 6-foot, 6 1/4-inch, 230-pound Jess Willard. The fight was set at the Oriental Park Racetrack in Havana, Cuba, on April 5, 1915, before a crowd of 25,000. At age 37, Johnson had a noticeable paunch and looked anything but ready for the scheduled 45-round bout. Nevertheless, he dominated the fight until the 20th round. In the 26th round, Willard penetrated Johnson's withering defense with a hard right to the head. Johnson was knocked out, and Willard became the new heavyweight champion.

Johnson is said by many a year after the fight to have spread rumors that he took a dive, but Willard is widely regarded as having won the fight outright. Many people thought Johnson purposely threw the fight because Willard was white, in an effort to have his Mann Act charges dropped. Willard ironically responded, "If he was going to throw the fight, I wish he'd done it sooner. It was hotter than hell out there."

=== Post-championship ===
After losing his world heavyweight championship, Johnson never again fought for the world or colored heavyweight crowns. His popularity remained strong enough that he recorded for Ajax Records in the 1920s. Johnson continued fighting, but age was catching up with him. He fought professionally until 1938 at age 60 when he lost 7 of his last 9 bouts, losing his final fight to Walter Price by a 7th-round TKO. It is often suggested that any bouts after the age of 40—which was a very venerable age for boxing in those days—not be counted on his actual record, since he was performing in order to make a living.

He also indulged in what was known as "cellar" fighting, where the bouts, unadvertised, were fought for private audiences, usually in cellars or other unrecognized places. There are surviving photographs of one of these fights. Johnson made his final ring appearance at age 67 on November 27, 1945, fighting three one-minute exhibition rounds against two opponents, Joe Jeanette and John Ballcort, in a benefit fight card for U.S. War Bonds.

== Boxing style ==
Throughout his career, Johnson built a unique fighting style of his own, which was not customary in boxing during this time. Though he would typically strike first, he would fight defensively, waiting for his opponents to tire out, becoming more aggressive as the rounds went on. He often fought to punish his opponents over the course of the bout rather than going for the knockout, and would continuously dodge their punches. He would then quickly strike back with a blow of his own. Johnson often made his fights look effortless, and as if he had much more to offer, but when pushed he could also display some powerful moves and punches. There are films of his fights in which he can be seen holding up his opponent, who otherwise might have fallen, until he recovered. Johnson was also known for his use of the mummy guard which was later adopted by boxers such as Sandy Saddler and George Foreman.

== Personal life ==
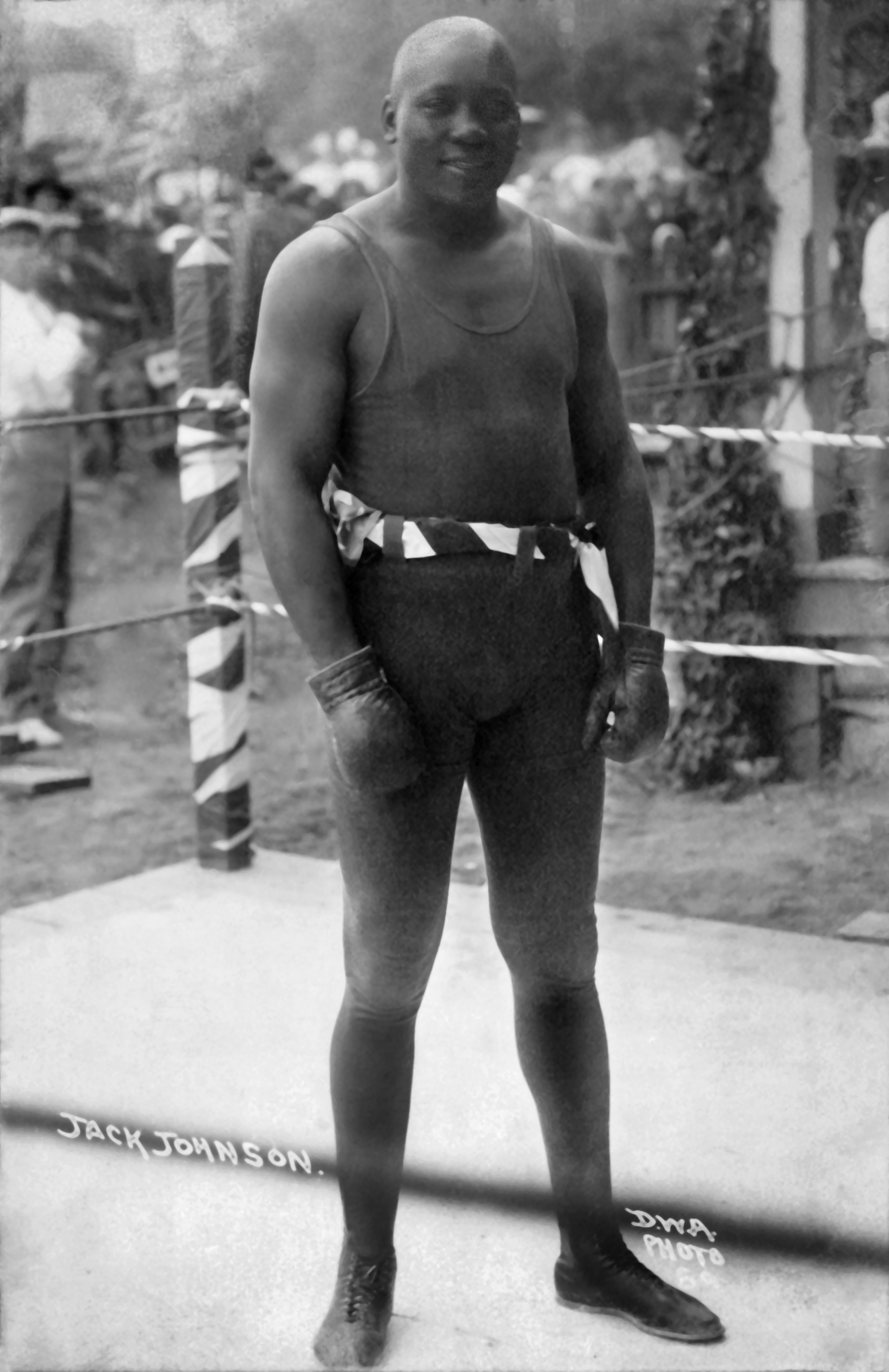
Jack Johnson, c. 1910–1915

Johnson earned considerable sums endorsing various products, including patent medicines, and had several expensive hobbies such as automobile racing and tailored clothing, as well as purchasing jewelry and furs for his wives. He challenged champion racer Barney Oldfield to an auto race at the Sheepshead Bay, Brooklyn dirt track. Oldfield easily defeated Johnson. Once, when he was pulled over for a $50 speeding ticket, he gave the officer a $100 bill; when the officer protested that he could not make change for that much, Johnson told him to keep the change as he was going to make his return trip at the same speed. In 1920, Johnson opened the Club Deluxe, a Black and Tan night club in Harlem; he sold it three years later to a gangster, Owney Madden, who renamed it the Cotton Club.

Johnson's behavior was looked down upon by some in the African-American community, especially by the black scholar Booker T. Washington, who said it "is unfortunate that a man with money should use it in a way to injure his own people, in the eyes of those who are seeking to uplift his race and improve its conditions, I wish to say emphatically that Jack Johnson's actions did not meet my personal approval and I am sure they do not meet with the approval of the colored race."

Johnson flouted conventions regarding the social and economic "place" of blacks in American society. As a black man, he broke a powerful taboo in consorting with white women and would verbally taunt men (both white and black) inside and outside the ring. When asked the secret of his staying power by a reporter who had watched a succession of women parade into, and out of, the champion's hotel room, Johnson supposedly said "Eat jellied eels and think distant thoughts."

In 1911, Johnson, through an acquaintance, attempted to become a Freemason in Dundee, Scotland. He was initiated as an Entered Apprentice at Forfar and Kincardine Lodge No 225 in the city. However, there was some opposition to his membership from within the lodge, but mainly from the Grand Lodge who tried to stop the initiation from going ahead due to most Grand Lodges in the USA threatening to withdraw their Scottish Grand Lodge representation if it did. The Forfarshire Lodge was suspended by the Grand Lodge of Scotland, and Johnson's fees were returned to him and his admission was ruled illegal.

In July 1912, Johnson opened an interracial nightclub in Chicago called Café de Champion.

Johnson wrote two memoirs of his life: Mes combats in 1914 and Jack Johnson in the Ring and Out in 1927.

In 1943, Johnson attended at least one service at the Pentecostal Angelus Temple in Los Angeles, California. In a public conversion, while Detroit, Michigan, burned in race riots, he professed his faith to Christ in a service conducted by evangelist Aimee Semple McPherson. She embraced him as "he raised his hand in worship".

=== Marriages ===
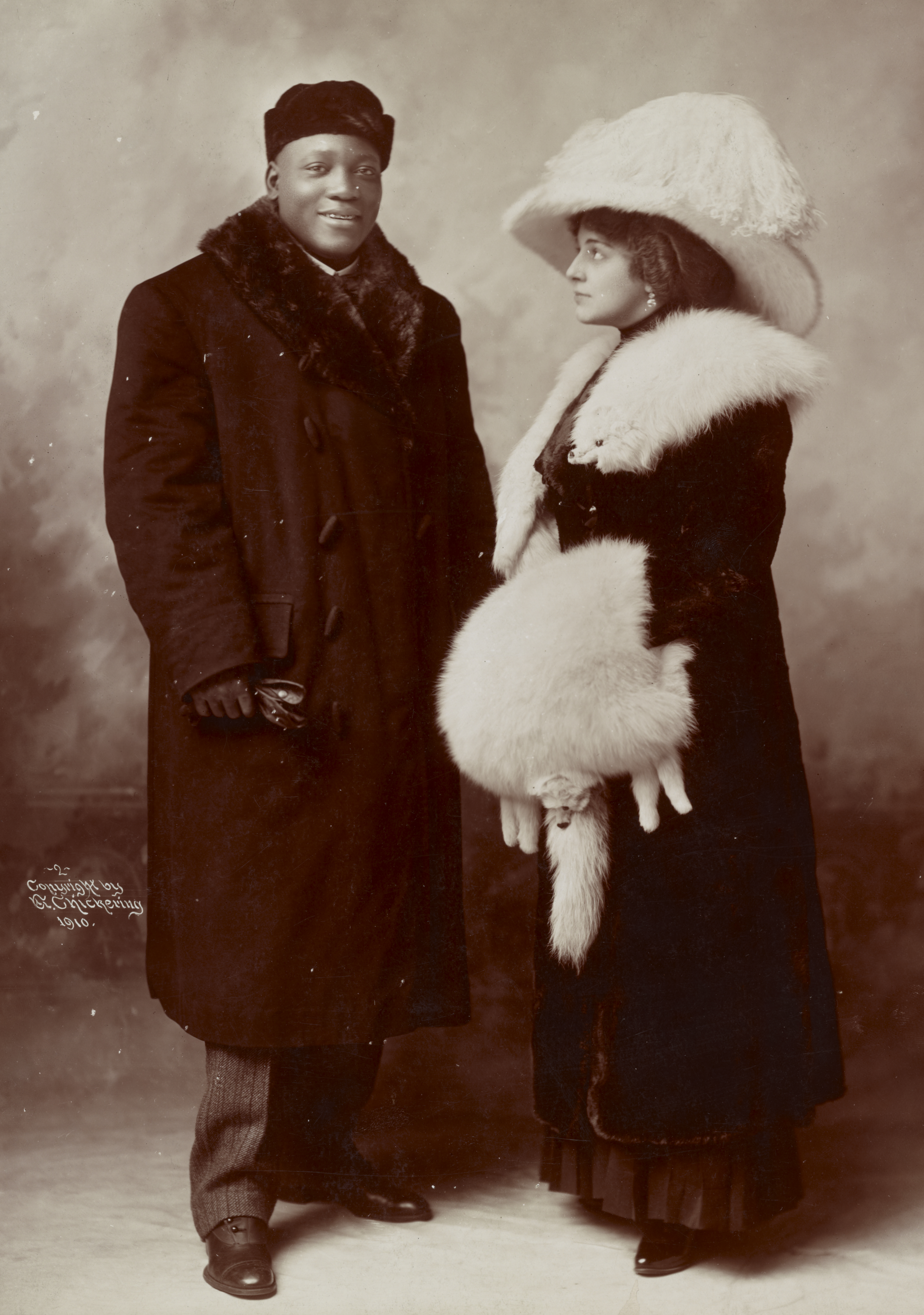
Johnson with his wife Etta Duryea, who killed herself in 1912

Johnson engaged in various relationships, including three documented marriages. All of his documented wives were white. At the height of his career, Johnson was excoriated by the press for his flashy lifestyle and for having married white women.

According to Johnson's 1927 autobiography, he married Mary Austin, a black woman from Galveston, Texas. No record exists of this marriage.

While in Philadelphia in 1903, Johnson met Clara Kerr, a black prostitute. According to Johnson's autobiography, Kerr left him for Johnson's friend, a racehorse trainer named William Bryant. They stole Johnson's jewelry and clothing when they left. Johnson tracked the couple down and had Kerr arrested on burglary charges. Johnson and Kerr reconciled for a while before she left him again.

During a three-month tour of Australia in 1907, Johnson had a brief affair with Alma "Lola" Toy, a white woman from Sydney. Johnson confirmed to an American journalist that he intended to marry Toy. When The Referee printed Johnson's plans to marry Toy, it caused controversy in Sydney. Toy demanded a retraction and later won a libel lawsuit from the newspaper.

After returning from Australia, Johnson said that "the heartaches which Mary Austin and Clara Kerr caused me led me to forswear colored women and to determine that my lot henceforth would be cast only with white women."

Johnson met Etta Terry Duryea, a Brooklyn socialite and former wife of Clarence Duryea, at a car race in 1909. In 1910, Johnson hired a private investigator to follow Duryea after suspecting she was having an affair with his chauffeur. On Christmas Day, Johnson confronted Duryea and beat her to the point of hospitalization. They reconciled and were married on January 18, 1911. Prone to depression, her condition worsened due to Johnson's abuse and infidelity in addition to the hostile reaction to their interracial relationship. Duryea attempted suicide twice before she died from a self-inflicted gunshot wound on September 11, 1912.

In the summer of 1912, Johnson met Lucille Cameron, an 18-year-old prostitute from Minneapolis who relocated to Chicago, at his nightclub Café de Champion. Johnson hired her as his stenographer, but shortly after Duryea's funeral, they were out in public as a couple. They married on December 3, 1912, at 3:00 p.m. Cameron filed for divorce in 1924 due to his infidelity.

Johnson met Irene Pineau at the race track in Aurora, Illinois, in 1924. After she divorced her husband the following year, they were married in Waukegan in August 1925. Johnson and Pineau were together until his death in 1946. When asked by a reporter at Johnson's funeral what she had loved about him, she replied: "I loved him because of his courage. He faced the world unafraid. There wasn't anybody or anything he feared."

=== Prison sentence ===
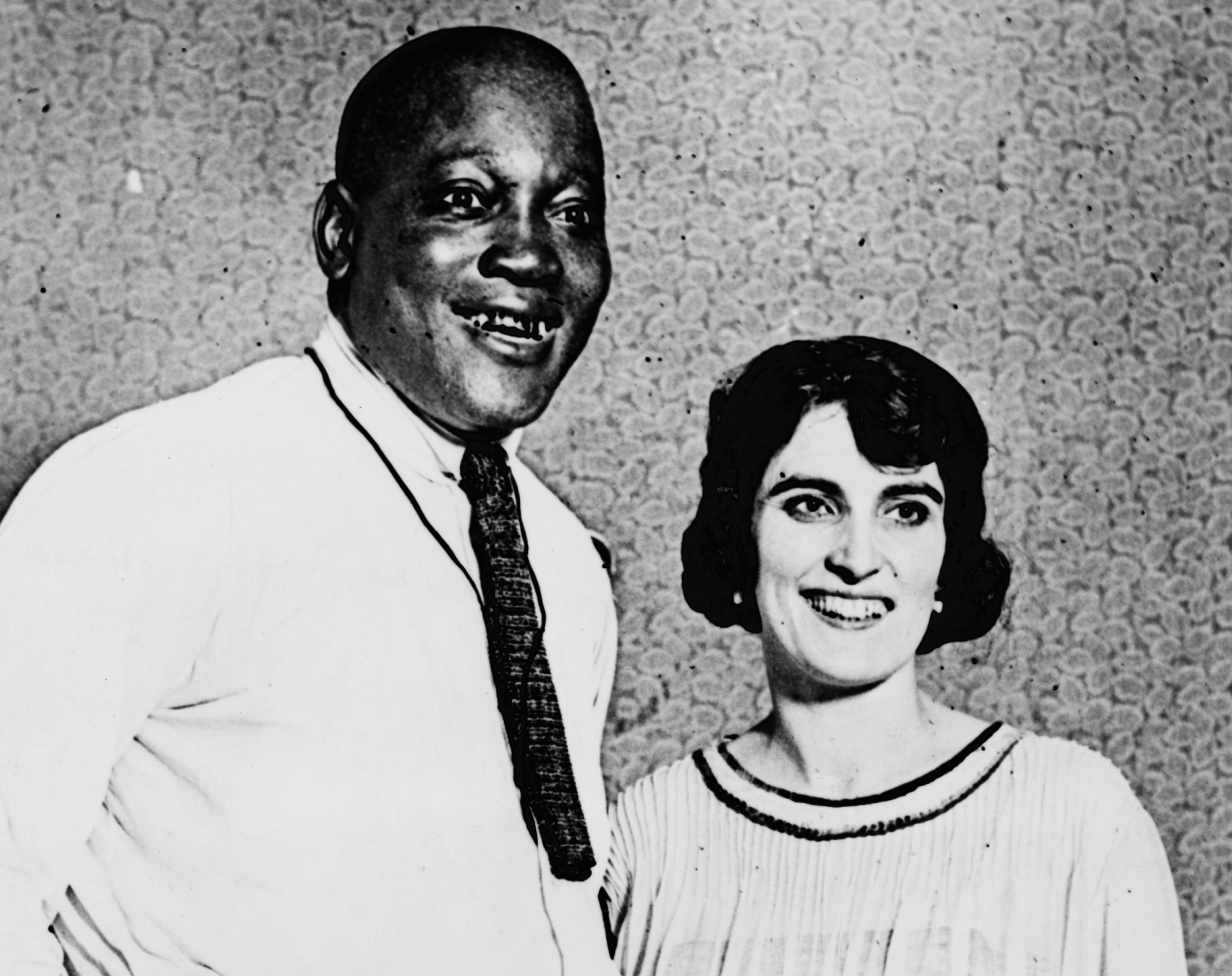
Johnson with his wife Lucille in 1921. Their relationship led to Johnson's first 1912 arrest.

On October 18, 1912, Johnson was arrested on the grounds that his relationship with Lucille Cameron violated the Mann Act against "transporting women across state lines for immoral purposes" due to her being an alleged prostitute. Her mother also swore that her daughter was insane. Cameron, soon to become his second wife, refused to cooperate and the case fell apart.

Less than a month later, Johnson was arrested again on similar charges. This time, the woman, another alleged prostitute named Belle Schreiber, with whom he had been involved in 1909 and 1910, testified against him. In the courtroom of Kenesaw Mountain Landis, the future Commissioner of Baseball who perpetuated the baseball color line until his death, Johnson was convicted by an all-white jury in June 1913, although the incidents used to convict him took place before passage of the Mann Act. He was sentenced to a year and a day in prison.

Johnson skipped bail and left the country, joining Lucille in Montreal on June 25, before fleeing to France. To flee to Canada, Johnson posed as a member of a black baseball team. They lived in exile in Europe, South America, and Mexico for the next seven years. Johnson returned to the U.S. on July 20, 1920. He surrendered to federal agents at the Mexican border and was sent to the United States Penitentiary, Leavenworth, to serve his sentence in September 1920. He was released on July 9, 1921.

==== Presidential pardon ====
May 2018 pardon granted by Donald Trump

President Donald Trump granted Johnson a posthumous presidential pardon after recurring proposals to grant one had not been acted on by previous administrations. In April 2018, Trump announced that he was considering granting a full pardon to Johnson on the advice of actor Sylvester Stallone. Trump pardoned Johnson on May 24, 2018, 105 years after his conviction, during a ceremony which included special guests Sylvester Stallone (actor), Deontay Wilder (then current WBC Champion), Lennox Lewis (WBC Former Champion), Mauricio Sulaiman (WBC President), Linda Bell Haywood (Johnson's great-great niece), and Hector Sulaiman (President of the Board of Advisors of Scholas Occurrentes).

A bill which requested that President George W. Bush pardon Johnson passed the House in 2008, but failed to pass in the Senate. In April 2009, Senator John McCain, along with Representative Peter King, film maker Ken Burns, and Johnson's great-niece, Linda Haywood, requested a presidential pardon for Johnson from President Barack Obama. In July of that year, Congress passed a resolution calling on President Obama to issue a pardon.

In 2016, another petition for Johnson's pardon was issued by McCain, King, Senator Harry Reid, and Congressman Gregory Meeks to President Obama, marking the 70th anniversary since the boxer's death. This time, the petitioners cited a provision of the Every Student Succeeds Act, signed by the president in December 2015, in which Congress expressed that this boxing great should receive a posthumous pardon, and a vote by the United States Commission on Civil Rights passed unanimously a week earlier in June 2016 to "right this century-old wrong."

Mike Tyson, Harry Reid, and John McCain lent their support to the campaign, starting a Change.org petition asking President Obama to posthumously pardon the world's first African American heavyweight boxing champion for his racially motivated 1913 felony conviction.

=== Monkey wrench ===
A persistent hoax on social media claims that Johnson invented the monkey wrench and it was named a monkey wrench as a racial slur. Johnson did receive a patent for improvements which he made to the monkey wrench, but the name "monkey wrench" and the first patent for it predate his birth by over 35 years.

== Death ==
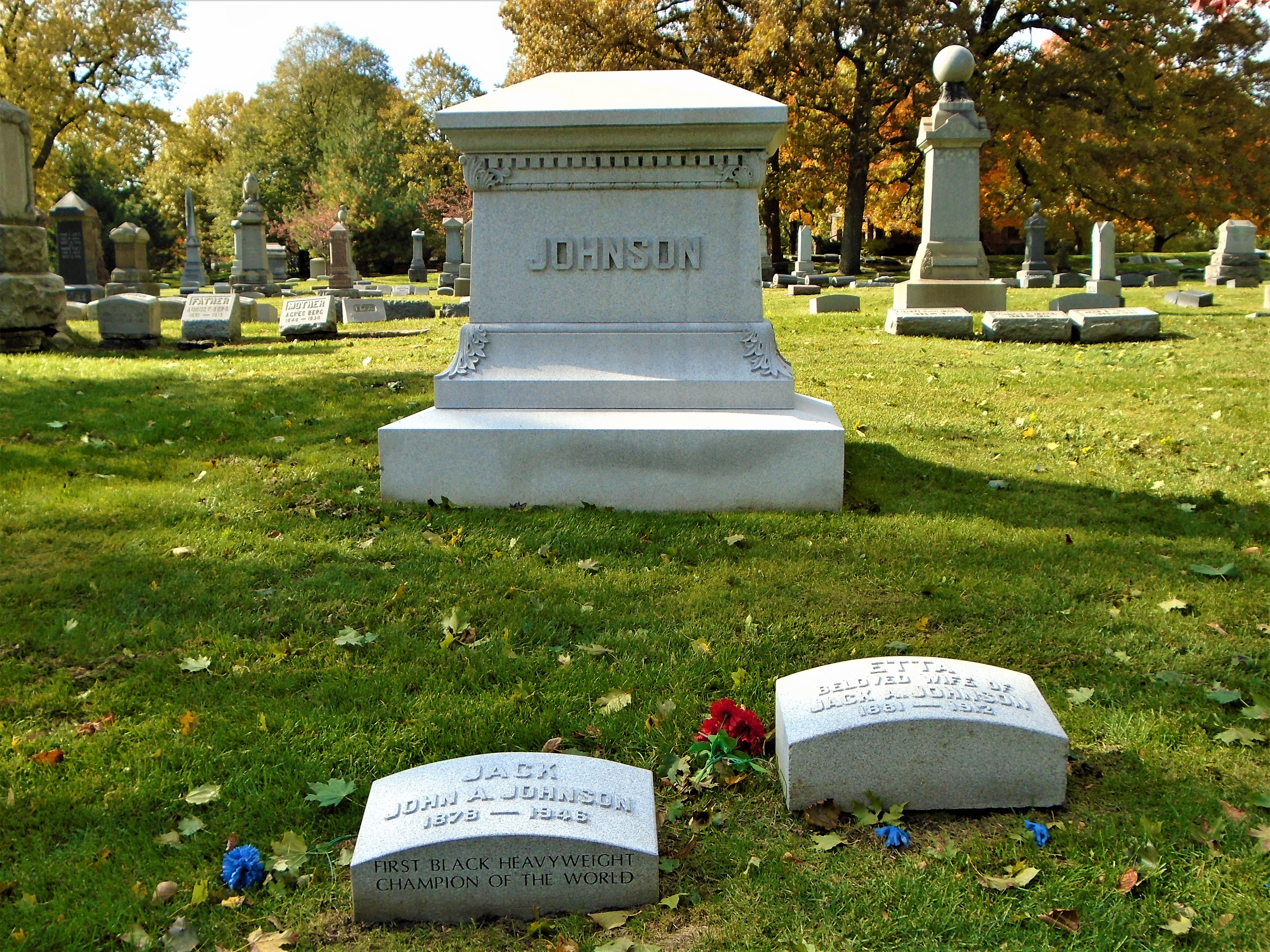
Graves of Jack and Etta Johnson in Graceland Cemetery, Chicago

On June 10, 1946, Johnson and a friend were en route to New York from Texas and visited a segregated diner; when the diner refused to serve him, Johnson drove away angrily with his friend in the passenger seat. The car collided with a telegraph pole on U.S. Highway 1 near Franklinton, North Carolina. (Note: Co-ordinates of the crash site: 36°5′41.96″N 78°27′40.81″W) While his friend survived the crash, Johnson suffered fatal injuries and died later that day at St. Agnes Hospital in Raleigh, North Carolina, which was the nearest black hospital, at 6:10 pm. He was 68 years old.

Johnson was buried at Graceland Cemetery in Chicago next to his first wife, Etta Duryea Johnson, who committed suicide in 1912. His grave was initially unmarked, but was later marked with a large tombstone which says only "Johnson". An additional marker was added after filmmaker Ken Burns released a film about Johnson's life in 2005. Johnson's footstone reads: "Jack / John A. Johnson. 1878–1946. First black heavyweight champion of the world." Johnson's signature is on the back of the stone.

== Legacy ==
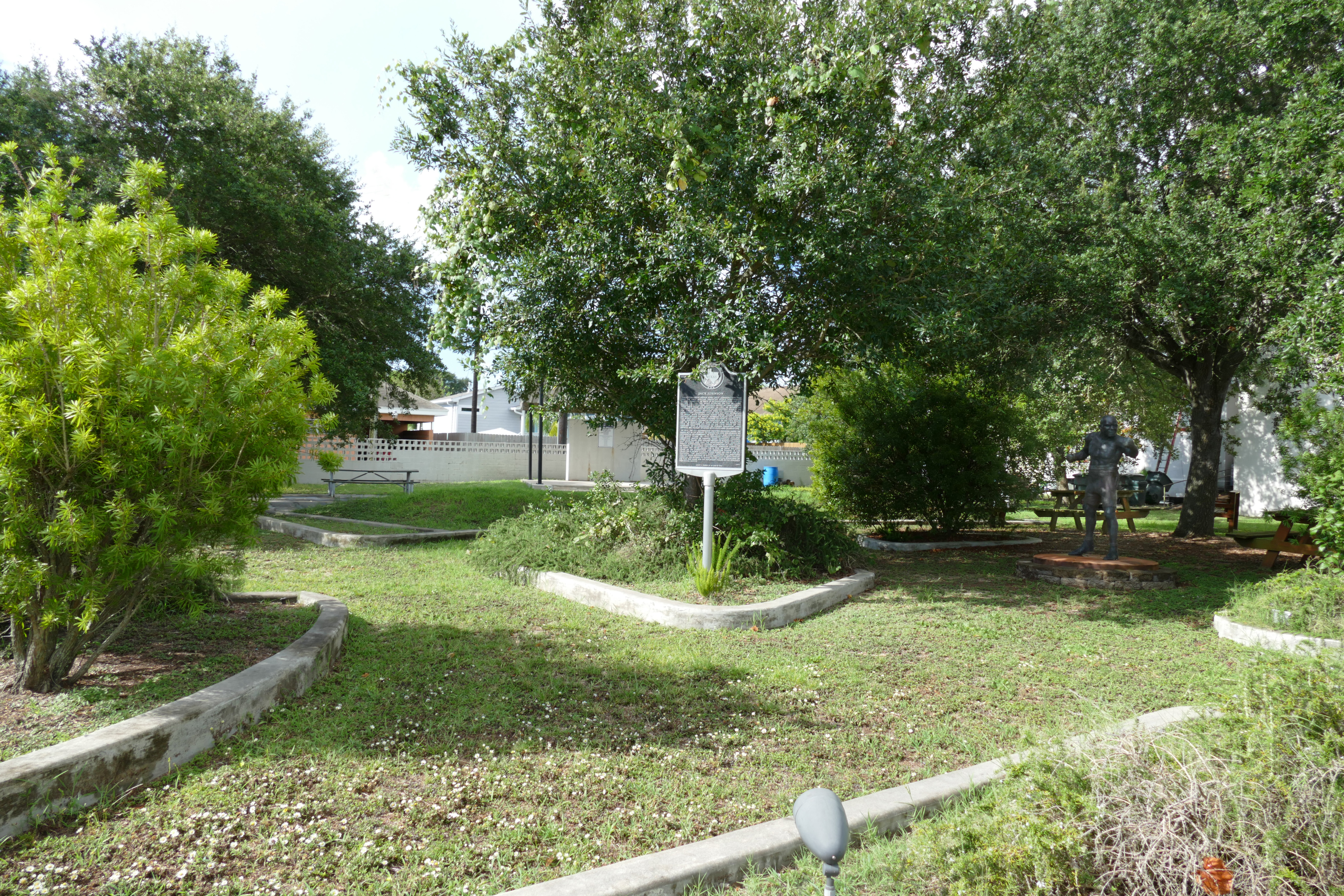
Jack Johnson Park -- Galveston

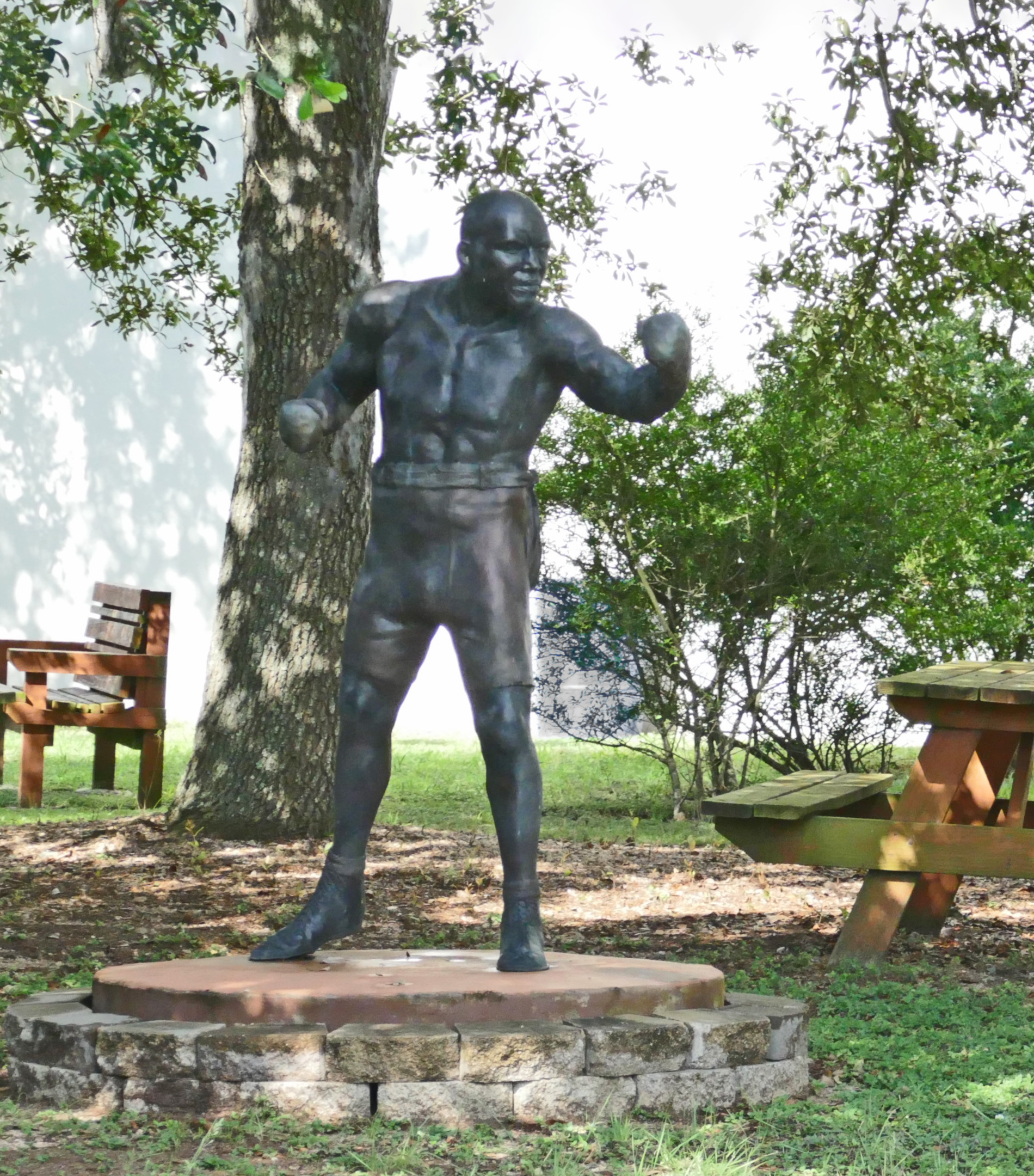
Jack Johnson Bronze Statue in Jack Johnson Park -- Galveston

Johnson was an inaugural 1954 inductee to The Ring magazine's Boxing Hall of Fame (disbanded in 1987), and was inducted to the International Boxing Hall of Fame in 1990. In 2005, the United States National Film Preservation Board deemed the film of the 1910 Johnson-Jeffries fight "historically significant" and put it in the National Film Registry.

During his boxing career, Jack Johnson fought 114 fights, winning 80 matches, 45 by knockouts. He also had the longest professional career of any world heavyweight boxing champion, having boxed for over 33 years from 1897 to 1931 (12,231 days). This record was beaten by Roy Jones Jr. in 2023, who has boxed for more than 33 years since 1989 (12,384 days).

Muhammad Ali often spoke of how he was influenced by Jack Johnson. Ali identified with Johnson because he felt America ostracized him in the same manner because of his opposition to the Vietnam War and affiliation with the Nation of Islam.

In 2002, scholar Molefi Kete Asante listed Jack Johnson on his list of 100 Greatest African Americans. In 2012, the City of Galveston dedicated a park in Johnson's memory as Galveston Island's most famous native son. The park, called Jack Johnson Park, includes a life-size, bronze statue of Johnson.

Actor and professional wrestler Dwayne "The Rock" Johnson's surname is an homage to Jack Johnson; his father, professional wrestler Rocky Johnson, was born with the surname "Bowles" and chose his ring name in honor of the boxer before making it his legal name.

Jack Johnson's personal life and relationships also shaped his public legacy. His open romantic involvement and marriages with white women provoked outrage in early twentieth-century America, where segregation and anti-miscegenation laws reinforced strict racial boundaries. Many newspapers portrayed him as dangerous or immoral, framing his confidence and success as a cultural threat to white supremacy. Still, his decision to live on his own terms inspired many African Americans, who saw in him a rare example of pride and independence during an era of racial violence. His success as a Black champion during the height of Jim Crow challenged the racial hierarchy that linked whiteness to physical and moral superiority. His victories, especially over white opponents like Jim Jeffries, provoked racial violence across the country, showing how sport could reflect and even intensify racial conflict. Later African American athletes, from Joe Louis to Muhammad Ali, would look to Johnson's defiance as both an inspiration and a warning about the costs of challenging racial boundaries in sport.

=== Popular culture ===
The first filmed fight of Johnson's career was his bout with Tommy Burns, which was turned into a contemporary documentary, The Burns-Johnson Fight, in 1908.

Folksinger and blues singer Lead Belly referenced Johnson in a song about the Titanic: "Jack Johnson wanna get on board, Captain said I ain't hauling no coal. Fare thee, Titanic, fare thee well. When Jack Johnson heard that mighty shock, mighta seen the man do the Eagle rock. Fare thee, Titanic, fare thee well" (The Eagle Rock was a popular dance at the time). In 1969, American folk singer Jaime Brockett reworked the Lead Belly song into a satirical talking blues called "The Legend of the S.S. Titanic."

In the trenches of World War One, Johnson's name was used by British troops to describe the impact of German 150 mm heavy artillery shells which had a black color. In his letters home to his wife, Rupert Edward Inglis (1863–1916), a former rugby international who was a Forces Chaplain, describes passing through the town of Albert:

We went through the place today (2 October 1915) where the Virgin Statue at the top of the Church was hit by a shell in January. The statue was knocked over, but has never fallen, I sent you a picture of it. It really is a wonderful sight. It is incomprehensible how it can have stayed there, but I think it is now lower than when the photograph was taken, and no doubt will come down with the next gale. The Church and village are wrecked, there's a huge hole made by a Jack Johnson just outside the west door of the Church.

Johnson's story is the basis of the play The Great White Hope and its 1970 film adaptation, starring James Earl Jones as "Jack Jefferson" and Jane Alexander as his love interest. Both Jones and Alexander won Tonys and were nominated for Oscars.

Also in 1970, Jimmy Jacobs and Bill Cayton brought together much of the rare archive footage of Johnson which they had saved and restored, and made the film Jack Johnson, with Johnson's words voiced by Brock Peters, and music by Miles Davis. Davis' score later became the 1971 album named after the boxer. It features the actor Peters (as Johnson) saying:

I'm Jack Johnson. Heavyweight champion of the world.
I'm black. They never let me forget it.
I'm black all right! I'll never let them forget it!

In 2005, filmmaker Ken Burns produced a two-part documentary about Johnson's life, Unforgivable Blackness: The Rise and Fall of Jack Johnson, based on the 2004 nonfiction book of the same name by Geoffrey C. Ward, and with music by Wynton Marsalis. The book won the William Hill Sports Book of the Year (2006).

Several Hip Hop activists have also reflected on Johnson's legacy, most notably in the album The New Danger, by Mos Def, in which songs like "Zimzallabim" and "Blue Black Jack" are devoted to the artist's pugilistic hero. In the closing track of the album Run the Jewels 3, "A Report to the Shareholders / Kill Your Masters," Killer Mike of the Hip Hop duo Run the Jewels reinvokes Johnson's image with the line: "I'm Jack Johnson, I beat a slave catcher snaggletooth." Additionally, both Southern punk rock band This Bike is a Pipe Bomb and alternative country performer Tom Russell have songs dedicated to Johnson. Russell's piece is both a tribute and a biting indictment of the racism Johnson faced: "here comes Jack Johnson, like he owns the town, there's a lot of white Americans like to see a man go down ... like to see a black man drown."

In Joe R. Lansdale's 1997 short story The Big Blow, Johnson is featured fighting a white boxer brought in by Galveston, Texas's boxing fans to defeat the African American fighter during the 1900 Galveston Hurricane. The story won a Bram Stoker Award and was expanded into a 2000 novel.

The book of poetry, The Big Smoke by Adrian Matejka, is inspired by Johnson's voice and life and written in forms ranging from sonnets to prose poetry. It was a finalist for the National Book Award for Poetry in 2013.

The Royale, a play by Marco Ramirez, uses the life of Jack Johnson as inspiration for its main character, Jay Jackson. It premiered in March 2016 at Lincoln Center Theater directed by Rachel Chavkin, and was nominated for a Drama Desk Awards for Outstanding Play, Outstanding Director of a Play, and a Special Drama Desk Award for Outstanding Ensemble.

The book Crossing the Color Line: Stanley Ketchel's Challenge for Jack Johnson's Heavyweight Crown, written by Vernon Gravely and released in 2021, details Johnson's fight with middleweight champion Stanley Ketchel.

The graphic novel "The Original Johnson" was written and drawn by Trevor Von Eeden, the first black artist ever hired by DC Comics, in 1976, and co-creator of their first original black super-hero, Black Lightning. "The Original Johnson" details Jack Johnson's life from childhood up to his death, and was generally well received. A favorable quote from the NY Times graces the cover of both volumes.

The graphic novel Last On His Feet: Jack Johnson and the Battle of the Century by Adrian Matejka and Youssef Daoudi, released in 2023, chronicles Johnson vs. Jeffries, interspersing the fight with flashbacks to Johnson's youth.

== Professional boxing record ==
All information in this section is derived from BoxRec, unless otherwise stated.

=== Official record ===
94 fights	54 wins	11 losses
By knockout	34	6
By decision	15	4
By disqualification	5	1
Draws	8	
No contests	4	
Newspaper decisions/draws	17	

All newspaper decisions are officially regarded as "no decision" bouts and are not counted in the win/loss/draw column.

No.	Result	Record	Opponent	Type	Round, time	Date	Age	Location	Notes
94	Win	54–11–8 (21)	Brad Simmons	KO	2 (10)	April 28, 1931	53 years, 28 days	Tulsa, Oklahoma, U.S.	
93	Loss	53–11–8 (21)	Brad Simmons	PTS	10	March 4, 1931	52 years, 338 days	Tulsa, Oklahoma, U.S.	
92	Win	53–10–8 (21)	Rough House Wilson	DQ	3 (10)	July 19, 1928	50 years, 110 days	Douglass Park, Indianapolis, Indiana, U.S.	
91	Loss	52–10–8 (21)	Bill Hartwell	RTD	6 (10)	May 15, 1928	50 years, 45 days	Memorial Hall, Kansas City, Kansas, U.S.	
90	Loss	52–9–8 (21)	Bearcat Wright	KO	5 (10)	April 16, 1928	50 years, 16 days	Topeka, Kansas, U.S.	
89	Loss	52–8–8 (21)	Brad Simmons	PTS	10	September 6, 1926	48 years, 159 days	101 Ranch Arena, Enid, Oklahoma, U.S.	
88	Loss	52–7–8 (21)	Bob Lawson	RTD	7 (12)	May 30, 1926	48 years, 60 days	Coliseum, Ciudad Juarez, Mexico	
87	Win	52–6–8 (21)	Pat Lester	PTS	15	May 2, 1926	48 years, 32 days	Plaza de Toros, Nogales, Sonora, Mexico	
86	Win	51–6–8 (21)	Homer Smith	PTS	10	February 22, 1924	45 years, 328 days	Théâtre Saint-Denis, Montreal, Canada	
85	Win	50–6–8 (21)	Jack Thompson	NWS	12	May 20, 1923	45 years, 50 days	Havana, Cuba	
84	Win	50–6–8 (20)	Farmer Lodge	KO	4	May 6, 1923	45 years, 36 days	Havana, Cuba	
83	Win	49–6–8 (20)	George Roberts	KO	3	May 17, 1920	42 years, 47 days	Tijuana, Baja California, Mexico	
82	Win	48–6–8 (20)	Bob Wilson	KO	3	April 18, 1920	42 years, 18 days	Mexicali, Baja California, Mexico	
81	Win	47–6–8 (20)	Marty Cutler	KO	6 (25)	September 28, 1919	41 years, 181 days	Mexico City, Mexico	
80	NC	46–6–8 (20)	Jerry Smith	NC	3 (?)	August 17, 1919	41 years, 139 days	Cine Teatro Venecia, Tampico, Mexico	Police stopped the fight
79	Win	46–6–8 (19)	Tom Cowler	PTS	15	August 10, 1919	41 years, 132 days	Plaza de Toros, Mexico City, Mexico	
78	Win	45–6–8 (19)	Bob Roper	PTS	10	June 22, 1919	41 years, 83 days	Mexico City, Mexico	
77	Win	44–6–8 (19)	Bill Flint	KO	2 (10)	February 12, 1919	40 years, 318 days	Teatro de la Gran Via, Madrid, Spain	
76	Win	43–6–8 (19)	Blink McCloskey	RTD	6 (20)	February 5, 1918	39 years, 311 days	Teatro Circo Price, Madrid, Spain	
75	Win	42–6–8 (19)	Arthur Cravan	KO	6 (20)	April 23, 1916	38 years, 23 days	Plaza de Toros Monumental, Barcelona, Spain	
74	Win	41–6–8 (19)	Frank Crozier	TKO	7 (10)	March 23, 1916	37 years, 358 days	Gran Teatro de Madrid, Madrid, Spain	
73	Loss	40–6–8 (19)	Jess Willard	KO	26 (45), 2:20	April 5, 1915	37 years, 5 days	Oriental Park, Havana, Cuba	Lost NYSAC heavyweight title
72	Win	40–5–8 (19)	Jack Murray	KO	3 (10)	January 10, 1915	36 years, 285 days	Sociedad Sportiva Argentina, Buenos Aires, Argentina	
71	Win	39–5–8 (19)	Frank Moran	PTS	20	June 27, 1914	36 years, 88 days	Vélodrome d'Hiver, Paris, France	Retained NYSAC heavyweight title
70	Draw	38–5–8 (19)	Battling Jim Johnson	PTS	10	December 19, 1913	35 years, 263 days	Élysée Montmartre, Paris, France	Retained NYSAC heavyweight title
69	Win	38–5–7 (19)	Fireman Jim Flynn	DQ	9 (45)	July 4, 1912	34 years, 95 days	East Las Vegas, Las Vegas, New Mexico, U.S.	Retained NYSAC heavyweight title
68	Win	37–5–7 (19)	James J. Jeffries	TKO	15 (45), 2:20	July 4, 1910	32 years, 95 days	Reno, Nevada, U.S.	Retained world heavyweight title
67	Win	36–5–7 (19)	Stanley Ketchel	KO	12 (20)	October 16, 1909	31 years, 199 days	Mission Street Arena, Colma, California, U.S.	Retained world heavyweight title
66	Win	35–5–7 (19)	Al Kaufman	NWS	10	September 9, 1909	31 years, 162 days	Coffroth's Arena, San Francisco, California, U.S.	World heavyweight title at stake; (via KO only)
65	Win	35–5–7 (18)	Tony Ross	NWS	6	June 30, 1909	31 years, 91 days	Duquesne Garden, Pittsburgh, Pennsylvania, U.S.	
64	Draw	35–5–7 (17)	Philadelphia Jack O'Brien	NWS	6	May 19, 1909	31 years, 49 days	National Athletic Club, Philadelphia, Pennsylvania, U.S.	World heavyweight title at stake; (via KO only)
63	Win	35–5–7 (16)	Tommy Burns	TKO	14 (20)	December 26, 1908	30 years, 270 days	Sydney Stadium, Sydney, Australia	Won world heavyweight title
62	Win	34–5–7 (16)	Ben Taylor	TKO	8 (10)	July 31, 1908	30 years, 122 days	Cosmopolitan Gymnasium, Plymouth, England	
61	Win	33–5–7 (16)	Fireman Jim Flynn	KO	11 (45), 1:30	November 2, 1907	29 years, 216 days	Coffroth's Arena, San Francisco, California, U.S.	
60	Win	32–5–7 (16)	Sailor Burke	NWS	6	September 12, 1907	29 years, 165 days	Smith's Theater, Bridgeport, Connecticut, U.S.	
59	Win	32–5–7 (15)	Charles Cutler	KO	1 (6)	August 28, 1907	29 years, 150 days	Lauer's Park, Reading, Pennsylvania, U.S.	
58	Win	31–5–7 (15)	Bob Fitzsimmons	KO	2 (6)	July 17, 1907	29 years, 108 days	Washington Sports Club, Philadelphia, Pennsylvania, U.S.	
57	Win	30–5–7 (15)	Bill Lang	TKO	9 (20)	March 4, 1907	28 years, 338 days	Richmond Race Course, Melbourne, Australia	
56	Win	29–5–7 (15)	Peter Felix	KO	1 (10), 2:20	February 19, 1907	28 years, 325 days	Gaiety Athletic Hall, Sydney, Australia	Retained world colored heavyweight title
55	Draw	28–5–7 (15)	Joe Jennette	NWS	10	November 26, 1906	28 years, 240 days	Auditorium, Portland, Maine, U.S.	World colored heavyweight title at stake; (via KO only)
54	Win	28–5–7 (14)	Jim Jeffords	NWS	6	November 8, 1906	28 years, 222 days	Lancaster Athletic Club, Lancaster, Pennsylvania, U.S.	
53	Win	28–5–7 (13)	Joe Jennette	NWS	6	September 20, 1906	28 years, 173 days	Broadway Athletic Club, Philadelphia, Pennsylvania, U.S.	
52	Draw	28–5–7 (12)	Billy Dunning	PTS	10	September 3, 1906	28 years, 156 days	Millinocket, Maine, U.S.	
51	Win	28–5–6 (12)	Charlie Haghey	KO	2 (12)	June 16, 1906	28 years, 77 days	Gloucester Athletic Club, Gloucester, Massachusetts, U.S.	
50	Win	27–5–6 (12)	Sam Langford	PTS	15	April 26, 1906	28 years, 26 days	Lincoln Athletic Club, Chelsea, Massachusetts, U.S.	Retained world colored heavyweight title
49	Win	26–5–6 (12)	Black Bill	KO	7 (10)	April 16, 1906	28 years, 16 days	Peerless Athletic Club, Pittston, Pennsylvania, U.S.	
48	Win	25–5–6 (12)	Joe Jennette	PTS	15	March 14, 1906	27 years, 348 days	Germania Maennerchor Hall, Baltimore, Maryland, U.S.	Retained world colored heavyweight title
47	Win	24–5–6 (12)	Joe Jennette	NWS	3	January 16, 1906	27 years, 291 days	Sharkey Athletic Club, New York City, New York, U.S.	
46	Win	24–5–6 (11)	Joe Jennette	NWS	6	December 2, 1905	27 years, 246 days	National Athletic Club, Philadelphia, Pennsylvania, U.S.	
45	Win	24–5–6 (10)	Young Peter Jackson	NWS	12	December 1, 1905	27 years, 245 days	Germania Maennerchor Hall, Baltimore, Maryland, U.S.	World colored heavyweight title at stake; (via KO only)
44	Loss	24–5–6 (9)	Joe Jennette	DQ	2 (6)	November 25, 1905	27 years, 239 days	National Athletic Club, Philadelphia, Pennsylvania, U.S.	
43	Win	24–4–6 (9)	Joe Grim	NWS	6	July 24, 1905	27 years, 115 days	National Athletic Club, Philadelphia, Pennsylvania, U.S.	
42	Win	24–4–6 (8)	Sandy Ferguson	DQ	7 (15)	July 18, 1905	27 years, 109 days	Douglas Athletic Club, Chelsea, Massachusetts, U.S.	
41	Win	23–4–6 (8)	Morris Harris	KO	1 (3)	July 13, 1905	27 years, 104 days	Broadway Athletic Club, Philadelphia, Pennsylvania, U.S.	
40	Win	22–4–6 (8)	Black Bill	NWS	3	July 13, 1905	27 years, 104 days	Broadway Athletic Club, Philadelphia, Pennsylvania, U.S.	
39	Win	22–4–6 (7)	Jack Munroe	NWS	6	June 26, 1905	27 years, 87 days	National Athletic Club, Philadelphia, Pennsylvania, U.S.	
38	Win	22–4–6 (6)	Walter Johnson	KO	3 (3)	May 9, 1905	27 years, 39 days	Knickerbocker Athletic Club, Philadelphia, Pennsylvania, U.S.	
37	Win	21–4–6 (6)	Joe Jennette	NWS	3	May 9, 1905	27 years, 39 days	Knickerbocker Athletic Club, Philadelphia, Pennsylvania, U.S.	
36	Win	21–4–6 (5)	Black Bill	TKO	4 (6)	May 2, 1905	27 years, 32 days	Knickerbocker Athletic Club, Philadelphia, Pennsylvania, U.S.	
35	Win	20–4–6 (5)	Jim Jeffords	KO	4 (6)	April 25, 1905	27 years, 25 days	Knickerbocker Athletic Club, Philadelphia, Pennsylvania, U.S.	
34	Loss	19–4–6 (5)	Marvin Hart	PTS	20	March 28, 1905	26 years, 362 days	Woodward's Pavilion, San Francisco, California, U.S.	
33	Win	19–3–6 (5)	Denver Ed Martin	KO	2 (20)	October 10, 1904	26 years, 193 days	Hazard's Pavilion, Los Angeles, California, U.S.	Retained world colored heavyweight title
32	Win	18–3–6 (5)	Frank Childs	PTS	6	June 2, 1904	26 years, 63 days	Apollo Hall, Chicago, Illinois, U.S.	Retained world colored heavyweight title
31	Win	17–3–6 (5)	Sam McVey	KO	20 (20)	April 22, 1904	26 years, 22 days	Mechanic's Pavilion, San Francisco, California, U.S.	Retained world colored heavyweight title
30	Win	16–3–6 (5)	Black Bill	NWS	6	February 15, 1904	25 years, 321 days	Lenox Athletic Club, Philadelphia, Pennsylvania, U.S.	
29	NC	16–3–6 (4)	Sandy Ferguson	NC	5 (6)	February 6, 1904	25 years, 312 days	National Athletic Club, Philadelphia, Pennsylvania, U.S.	
28	Win	16–3–6 (3)	Sandy Ferguson	PTS	20	December 11, 1903	25 years, 255 days	Colma, California, U.S.	
27	Win	15–3–6 (3)	Sam McVey	PTS	20	October 27, 1903	25 years, 210 days	Hazard's Pavilion, Los Angeles, California, U.S.	Retained world colored heavyweight title
26	Win	14–3–6 (3)	Sandy Ferguson	NWS	6	July 31, 1903	25 years, 122 days	Penn Art Club, Philadelphia, Pennsylvania, U.S.	
25	Win	14–3–6 (2)	Joe Butler	KO	3 (6)	May 11, 1903	25 years, 41 days	Washington Sports Club, Philadelphia, Pennsylvania, U.S.	
24	Win	13–3–6 (2)	Sandy Ferguson	PTS	10	April 16, 1903	25 years, 16 days	Essex Athletic Club, Boston, Massachusetts, U.S.	
23	Win	12–3–6 (2)	Sam McVey	PTS	20	February 26, 1903	24 years, 332 days	Hazard's Pavilion, Los Angeles, California, U.S.	Retained world colored heavyweight title
22	Win	11–3–6 (2)	Denver Ed Martin	PTS	20	February 5, 1903	24 years, 311 days	Hazard's Pavilion, Los Angeles, California, U.S.	Won world colored heavyweight title
21	Win	10–3–6 (2)	Fred Russell	DQ	8 (20)	December 4, 1902	24 years, 248 days	Hazard's Pavilion, Los Angeles, California, U.S.	
20	Win	9–3–6 (2)	George Gardiner	PTS	20	October 31, 1902	24 years, 214 days	Woodward's Pavilion, San Francisco, California, U.S.	
19	Win	8–3–6 (2)	Frank Childs	TKO	12 (20)	October 21, 1902	24 years, 204 days	Hazard's Pavilion, Los Angeles, California, U.S.	Won world colored heavyweight title claim
18	Draw	7–3–6 (2)	Hank Griffin	PTS	20	June 20, 1902	24 years, 81 days	Hazard's Pavilion, Los Angeles, California, U.S.	
17	Win	7–3–5 (2)	Jack Jeffries	KO	5 (20)	May 16, 1902	24 years, 46 days	Hazard's Pavilion, Los Angeles, California, U.S.	
16	Win	6–3–5 (2)	Joe Kennedy	KO	4 (15)	March 7, 1902	23 years, 341 days	Reliance Athletic Club, Oakland, California, U.S.	
15	Draw	5–3–5 (2)	Hank Griffin	PTS	15	December 27, 1901	23 years, 271 days	Reliance Athletic Club, Oakland, California, U.S.	
14	Loss	5–3–4 (2)	Hank Griffin	PTS	20	November 4, 1901	23 years, 218 days	Armory Hall, Bakersfield, California, U.S.	
13	Draw	5–2–4 (2)	Mexican Pete Everett	PTS	20	August 14, 1901	23 years, 136 days	Gold Coin Club, Victor, Colorado, U.S.	
12	Draw	5–2–3 (2)	Billy Stift	PTS	10	April 26, 1901	23 years, 26 days	Colorado Athletic Club, Denver, Colorado, U.S.	
11	Loss	5–2–2 (2)	Joe Choynski	KO	3 (20)	February 25, 1901	22 years, 331 days	Harmony Hall, Galveston, Texas, U.S.	
10	Draw	5–1–2 (2)	Jim Scanlon	PTS	7 (20)	January 14, 1901	22 years, 289 days	Galveston Athletic Club, Galveston, Texas, U.S.	
9	Win	5–1–1 (2)	Klondike Haynes	TKO	4 (20)	December 27, 1900	22 years, 271 days	Phoenix Athletic Club, Memphis, Tennessee, U.S.	
8	Draw	4–1–1 (2)	Klondike Haynes	PTS	20	June 25, 1900	22 years, 86 days	Galveston Athletic Club, Galveston, Texas, U.S.	Pre-arranged draw if lasting the distance
7	Win	4–1 (2)	Jim McCormick	DQ	6 (20)	April 20, 1900	22 years, 20 days	Galveston Athletic Club, Galveston, Texas, U.S.	
6	ND	3–1 (2)	William McNeill	ND	4	April 9, 1900	22 years, 9 days	Galveston Athletic Club, Galveston, Texas, U.S.	
5	ND	3–1 (1)	Jim McCormick	ND	15	March 21, 1900	21 years, 355 days	Galveston Athletic Club, Galveston, Texas, U.S.	
4	Loss	3–1	Klondike Haynes	TKO	5 (6)	May 6, 1899	21 years, 36 days	Howard Theatre, Chicago, Illinois, U.S.	For inaugural black heavyweight title
3	Win	3–0	Cherokee	KO	? (6)	July 24, 1898	20 years, 115 days	Kansas City, Kansas, U.S.	
2	Win	2–0	Ed Johnson	KO	5	November 20, 1897	19 years, 234 days	Convention Hall, Galveston, Texas, U.S.	Retained Texas State middleweight title
1	Win	1–0	Charley Brooks	KO	2 (15)	November 1, 1897	19 years, 215 days	Prof. Bernau's Gymnasium, Galveston, Texas, U.S.	Won Texas State middleweight title

=== Unofficial record ===
94 fights	69 wins	11 losses
By knockout	34	6
By decision	30	4
By disqualification	5	1
Draws	10	
No contests	4	

Record with the inclusion of newspaper decisions in the win/loss/draw column.

No.	Result	Record	Opponent	Type	Round, time	Date	Age	Location	Notes
94	Win	69–11–10 (4)	Brad Simmons	KO	2 (10)	April 28, 1931	53 years, 28 days	Tulsa, Oklahoma, U.S.	
93	Loss	68–11–10 (4)	Brad Simmons	PTS	10	March 4, 1931	52 years, 338 days	Tulsa, Oklahoma, U.S.	
92	Win	68–10–10 (4)	Rough House Wilson	DQ	3 (10)	July 19, 1928	50 years, 110 days	Douglas Park, Indianapolis, Indiana, U.S.	
91	Loss	67–10–10 (4)	Bill Hartwell	RTD	6 (10)	May 15, 1928	50 years, 45 days	Memorial Hall, Kansas City, Kansas, U.S.	
90	Loss	67–9–10 (4)	Bearcat Wright	KO	5 (10)	April 16, 1928	50 years, 16 days	Topeka, Kansas, U.S.	
89	Loss	67–8–10 (4)	Brad Simmons	PTS	10	September 6, 1926	48 years, 159 days	101 Ranch Arena, Enid, Oklahoma, U.S.	
88	Loss	67–7–10 (4)	Bob Lawson	RTD	7 (12)	May 30, 1926	48 years, 60 days	Coliseum, Ciudad Juarez, Mexico	
87	Win	67–6–10 (4)	Pat Lester	PTS	15	May 2, 1926	48 years, 32 days	Plaza de Toros, Nogales, Sonora, Mexico	
86	Win	66–6–10 (4)	Homer Smith	PTS	10	February 22, 1924	45 years, 328 days	Théâtre Saint-Denis, Montreal, Canada	
85	Win	65–6–10 (4)	Jack Thompson	NWS	12	May 20, 1923	45 years, 50 days	Havana, Cuba	
84	Win	64–6–10 (4)	Farmer Lodge	KO	4	May 6, 1923	45 years, 36 days	Havana, Cuba	
83	Win	63–6–10 (4)	George Roberts	KO	3	May 17, 1920	42 years, 47 days	Tijuana, Baja California, Mexico	
82	Win	62–6–10 (4)	Bob Wilson	KO	3	April 18, 1920	42 years, 18 days	Mexicali, Baja California, Mexico	
81	Win	61–6–10 (4)	Marty Cutler	KO	6 (25)	September 28, 1919	41 years, 181 days	Mexico City, Mexico	
80	NC	60–6–10 (4)	Jerry Smith	NC	3 (?)	August 17, 1919	41 years, 139 days	Cine Teatro Venecia, Tampico, Mexico	Police stopped the fight
79	Win	60–6–10 (3)	Tom Cowler	PTS	15	August 10, 1919	41 years, 132 days	Plaza de Toros, Mexico City, Mexico	
78	Win	59–6–10 (3)	Bob Roper	PTS	10	June 22, 1919	41 years, 83 days	Mexico City, Mexico	
77	Win	58–6–10 (3)	Bill Flint	KO	2 (10)	February 12, 1919	40 years, 318 days	Teatro de la Gran Via, Madrid, Spain	
76	Win	57–6–10 (3)	Blink McCloskey	RTD	6 (20)	February 5, 1918	39 years, 311 days	Teatro Circo Price, Madrid, Spain	
75	Win	56–6–10 (3)	Arthur Cravan	KO	6 (20)	April 23, 1916	38 years, 23 days	Plaza de Toros Monumental, Barcelona, Spain	
74	Win	55–6–10 (3)	Frank Crozier	TKO	7 (10)	March 23, 1916	37 years, 358 days	Gran Teatro de Madrid, Madrid, Spain	
73	Loss	54–6–10 (3)	Jess Willard	KO	26 (45), 2:20	April 5, 1915	37 years, 5 days	Oriental Park, Havana, Cuba	Lost NYSAC heavyweight title
72	Win	54–5–10 (3)	Jack Murray	KO	3 (10)	January 10, 1915	36 years, 285 days	Sociedad Sportiva Argentina, Buenos Aires, Argentina	
71	Win	53–5–10 (3)	Frank Moran	PTS	20	June 27, 1914	36 years, 88 days	Vélodrome d'Hiver, Paris, France	Retained NYSAC heavyweight title
70	Draw	52–5–10 (3)	Battling Jim Johnson	PTS	10	December 19, 1913	35 years, 263 days	Élysée Montmartre, Paris, France	Retained NYSAC heavyweight title
69	Win	52–5–9 (3)	Fireman Jim Flynn	DQ	9 (45)	July 4, 1912	34 years, 95 days	East Las Vegas, Las Vegas, New Mexico, U.S.	Retained NYSAC heavyweight title
68	Win	51–5–9 (3)	James J. Jeffries	TKO	15 (45), 2:20	July 4, 1910	32 years, 95 days	Reno, Nevada, U.S.	Retained world heavyweight title
67	Win	50–5–9 (3)	Stanley Ketchel	KO	12 (20)	October 16, 1909	31 years, 199 days	Mission Street Arena, Colma, California, U.S.	Retained world heavyweight title
66	Win	49–5–9 (3)	Al Kaufman	NWS	10	September 9, 1909	31 years, 162 days	Coffroth's Arena, San Francisco, California, U.S.	World heavyweight title at stake; (via KO only)
65	Win	48–5–9 (3)	Tony Ross	NWS	6	June 30, 1909	31 years, 91 days	Duquesne Garden, Pittsburgh, Pennsylvania, U.S.	
64	Draw	47–5–9 (3)	Philadelphia Jack O'Brien	NWS	6	May 19, 1909	31 years, 49 days	National Athletic Club, Philadelphia, Pennsylvania, U.S.	World heavyweight title at stake; (via KO only)
63	Win	47–5–8 (3)	Tommy Burns	PTS	14 (20)	December 26, 1908	30 years, 270 days	Sydney Stadium, Sydney, Australia	Won world heavyweight title
62	Win	46–5–8 (3)	Ben Taylor	TKO	8 (10)	July 31, 1908	30 years, 122 days	Cosmopolitan Gymnasium, Plymouth, England	
61	Win	45–5–8 (3)	Fireman Jim Flynn	KO	11 (45), 1:30	November 2, 1907	29 years, 216 days	Coffroth's Arena, San Francisco, California, U.S.	
60	Win	44–5–8 (3)	Sailor Burke	NWS	6	September 12, 1907	29 years, 165 days	Smith's Theater, Bridgeport, Connecticut, U.S.	
59	Win	43–5–8 (3)	Charles Cutler	KO	1 (6)	August 28, 1907	29 years, 150 days	Lauer's Park, Reading, Pennsylvania, U.S.	
58	Win	42–5–8 (3)	Bob Fitzsimmons	KO	2 (6)	July 17, 1907	29 years, 108 days	Washington Sports Club, Philadelphia, Pennsylvania, U.S.	
57	Win	41–5–8 (3)	Bill Lang	TKO	9 (20)	March 4, 1907	28 years, 338 days	Richmond Race Course, Melbourne, Australia	
56	Win	40–5–8 (3)	Peter Felix	KO	1 (10), 2:20	February 19, 1907	28 years, 325 days	Gaiety Athletic Hall, Sydney, Australia	Retained world colored heavyweight title
55	Draw	39–5–8 (3)	Joe Jennette	NWS	10	November 26, 1906	28 years, 240 days	Auditorium, Portland, Maine, U.S.	World colored heavyweight title at stake; (via KO only)
54	Win	39–5–7 (3)	Jim Jeffords	NWS	6	November 8, 1906	28 years, 222 days	Lancaster Athletic Club, Lancaster, Pennsylvania, U.S.	
53	Win	38–5–7 (3)	Joe Jennette	NWS	6	September 20, 1906	28 years, 173 days	Broadway Athletic Club, Philadelphia, Pennsylvania, U.S.	
52	Draw	37–5–7 (3)	Billy Dunning	NWS	10	September 3, 1906	28 years, 156 days	Millinocket, Maine, U.S.	
51	Win	37–5–6 (3)	Charlie Haghey	KO	2 (12)	June 16, 1906	28 years, 77 days	Gloucester Athletic Club, Gloucester, Massachusetts, U.S.	
50	Win	36–5–6 (3)	Sam Langford	PTS	15	April 26, 1906	28 years, 26 days	Lincoln Athletic Club, Chelsea, Massachusetts, U.S.	Retained world colored heavyweight title
49	Win	35–5–6 (3)	Black Bill	KO	7 (10)	April 16, 1906	28 years, 16 days	Peerless Athletic Club, Pittston, Pennsylvania, U.S.	
48	Win	34–5–6 (3)	Joe Jennette	PTS	15	March 14, 1906	27 years, 348 days	Germania Maennerchor Hall, Baltimore, Maryland, U.S.	Retained world colored heavyweight title
47	Win	33–5–6 (3)	Joe Jennette	NWS	3	January 16, 1906	27 years, 291 days	Sharkey Athletic Club, New York City, New York, U.S.	
46	Win	32–5–6 (3)	Joe Jennette	NWS	6	December 2, 1905	27 years, 246 days	National Athletic Club, Philadelphia, Pennsylvania, U.S.	
45	Win	31–5–6 (3)	Young Peter Jackson	NWS	12	December 1, 1905	27 years, 245 days	Germania Maennerchor Hall, Baltimore, Maryland, U.S.	World colored heavyweight title at stake; (via KO only)
44	Loss	30–5–6 (3)	Joe Jennette	DQ	2 (6)	November 25, 1905	27 years, 239 days	National Athletic Club, Philadelphia, Pennsylvania, U.S.	
43	Win	30–4–6 (3)	Joe Grim	NWS	6	July 24, 1905	27 years, 115 days	National Athletic Club, Philadelphia, Pennsylvania, U.S.	
42	Win	29–4–6 (3)	Sandy Ferguson	DQ	7 (15)	July 18, 1905	27 years, 109 days	Douglas Athletic Club, Chelsea, Massachusetts, U.S.	
41	Win	28–4–6 (3)	Morris Harris	KO	1 (3)	July 13, 1905	27 years, 104 days	Broadway Athletic Club, Philadelphia, Pennsylvania, U.S.	
40	Win	27–4–6 (3)	Black Bill	NWS	3	July 13, 1905	27 years, 104 days	Broadway Athletic Club, Philadelphia, Pennsylvania, U.S.	
39	Win	26–4–6 (3)	Jack Munroe	NWS	6	June 26, 1905	27 years, 87 days	National Athletic Club, Philadelphia, Pennsylvania, U.S.	
38	Win	25–4–6 (3)	Walter Johnson	KO	3 (3)	May 9, 1905	27 years, 39 days	Knickerbocker Athletic Club, Philadelphia, Pennsylvania, U.S.	
37	Win	24–4–6 (3)	Joe Jennette	NWS	3	May 9, 1905	27 years, 39 days	Knickerbocker Athletic Club, Philadelphia, Pennsylvania, U.S.	
36	Win	23–4–6 (3)	Black Bill	TKO	4 (6)	May 2, 1905	27 years, 32 days	Knickerbocker Athletic Club, Philadelphia, Pennsylvania, U.S.	
35	Win	22–4–6 (3)	Jim Jeffords	KO	4 (6)	April 25, 1905	27 years, 25 days	Knickerbocker Athletic Club, Philadelphia, Pennsylvania, U.S.	
34	Loss	21–4–6 (3)	Marvin Hart	PTS	20	March 28, 1905	26 years, 362 days	Woodward's Pavilion, San Francisco, California, U.S.	
33	Win	21–3–6 (3)	Denver Ed Martin	KO	2 (20)	October 10, 1904	26 years, 193 days	Hazard's Pavilion, Los Angeles, California, U.S.	Retained world colored heavyweight title
32	Win	20–3–6 (3)	Frank Childs	PTS	6	June 2, 1904	26 years, 63 days	Apollo Hall, Chicago, Illinois, U.S.	Retained world colored heavyweight title
31	Win	19–3–6 (3)	Sam McVey	KO	20 (20)	April 22, 1904	26 years, 22 days	Mechanic's Pavilion, San Francisco, California, U.S.	Retained world colored heavyweight title
30	Win	18–3–6 (3)	Black Bill	NWS	6	February 15, 1904	25 years, 321 days	Lenox Athletic Club, Philadelphia, Pennsylvania, U.S.	
29	NC	17–3–6 (3)	Sandy Ferguson	NC	5 (6)	February 6, 1904	25 years, 312 days	National Athletic Club, Philadelphia, Pennsylvania, U.S.	
28	Win	17–3–6 (2)	Sandy Ferguson	PTS	20	December 11, 1903	25 years, 255 days	Colma, California, U.S.	
27	Win	16–3–6 (2)	Sam McVey	PTS	20	October 27, 1903	25 years, 210 days	Hazard's Pavilion, Los Angeles, California, U.S.	Retained world colored heavyweight title
26	Win	15–3–6 (2)	Sandy Ferguson	NWS	6	July 31, 1903	25 years, 122 days	Penn Art Club, Philadelphia, Pennsylvania, U.S.	
25	Win	14–3–6 (2)	Joe Butler	KO	3 (6)	May 11, 1903	25 years, 41 days	Washington Sports Club, Philadelphia, Pennsylvania, U.S.	
24	Win	13–3–6 (2)	Sandy Ferguson	PTS	10	April 16, 1903	25 years, 16 days	Essex Athletic Club, Boston, Massachusetts, U.S.	
23	Win	12–3–6 (2)	Sam McVey	PTS	20	February 26, 1903	24 years, 332 days	Hazard's Pavilion, Los Angeles, California, U.S.	Retained world colored heavyweight title
22	Win	11–3–6 (2)	Denver Ed Martin	PTS	20	February 5, 1903	24 years, 311 days	Hazard's Pavilion, Los Angeles, California, U.S.	Won world colored heavyweight title
21	Win	10–3–6 (2)	Fred Russell	DQ	8 (20)	December 4, 1902	24 years, 248 days	Hazard's Pavilion, Los Angeles, California, U.S.	
20	Win	9–3–6 (2)	George Gardiner	PTS	20	October 31, 1902	24 years, 214 days	Woodward's Pavilion, San Francisco, California, U.S.	
19	Win	8–3–6 (2)	Frank Childs	TKO	12 (20)	October 21, 1902	24 years, 204 days	Hazard's Pavilion, Los Angeles, California, U.S.	Won world colored heavyweight title claim
18	Draw	7–3–6 (2)	Hank Griffin	PTS	20	June 20, 1902	24 years, 81 days	Hazard's Pavilion, Los Angeles, California, U.S.	
17	Win	7–3–5 (2)	Jack Jeffries	KO	5 (20)	May 16, 1902	24 years, 46 days	Hazard's Pavilion, Los Angeles, California, U.S.	
16	Win	6–3–5 (2)	Joe Kennedy	KO	4 (15)	March 7, 1902	23 years, 341 days	Reliance Athletic Club, Oakland, California, U.S.	
15	Draw	5–3–5 (2)	Hank Griffin	PTS	15	December 27, 1901	23 years, 271 days	Reliance Athletic Club, Oakland, California, U.S.	
14	Loss	5–3–4 (2)	Hank Griffin	PTS	20	November 4, 1901	23 years, 218 days	Armory Hall, Bakersfield, California, U.S.	
13	Draw	5–2–4 (2)	Mexican Pete Everett	PTS	20	August 14, 1901	23 years, 136 days	Gold Coin Club, Victor, Colorado, U.S.	
12	Draw	5–2–3 (2)	Billy Stift	PTS	10	April 26, 1901	23 years, 26 days	Colorado Athletic Club, Denver, Colorado, U.S.	
11	Loss	5–2–2 (2)	Joe Choynski	KO	3 (20)	February 25, 1901	22 years, 331 days	Harmony Hall, Galveston, Texas, U.S.	
10	Draw	5–1–2 (2)	Jim Scanlon	PTS	7 (20)	January 14, 1901	22 years, 289 days	Galveston Athletic Club, Galveston, Texas, U.S.	
9	Win	5–1–1 (2)	Klondike Haynes	TKO	4 (20)	December 27, 1900	22 years, 271 days	Phoenix Athletic Club, Memphis, Tennessee, U.S.	
8	Draw	4–1–1 (2)	Klondike Haynes	PTS	20	June 25, 1900	22 years, 86 days	Galveston Athletic Club, Galveston, Texas, U.S.	Pre-arranged draw if lasting the distance
7	Win	4–1 (2)	Jim McCormick	DQ	6 (20)	April 20, 1900	22 years, 20 days	Galveston Athletic Club, Galveston, Texas, U.S.	
6	ND	3–1 (2)	William McNeill	ND	4	April 9, 1900	22 years, 9 days	Galveston Athletic Club, Galveston, Texas, U.S.	
5	ND	3–1 (1)	Jim McCormick	ND	15	March 21, 1900	21 years, 355 days	Galveston Athletic Club, Galveston, Texas, U.S.	
4	Loss	3–1	Klondike Haynes	TKO	5 (6)	May 6, 1899	21 years, 36 days	Howard Theatre, Chicago, Illinois, U.S.	For inaugural black heavyweight title
3	Win	3–0	Cherokee	KO	? (6)	July 24, 1898	20 years, 115 days	Kansas City, Kansas, U.S.	
2	Win	2–0	Ed Johnson	KO	5	November 20, 1897	19 years, 234 days	Convention Hall, Galveston, Texas, U.S.	Retained Texas State middleweight title
1	Win	1–0	Charley Brooks	KO	2 (15)	November 1, 1897	19 years, 215 days	Prof. Bernau's Gymnasium, Galveston, Texas, U.S.	Won Texas State middleweight title

== Titles in boxing ==
=== Major world titles ===
- World heavyweight champion (Note: The first African American heavyweight boxing champion ever.) (200+ lbs)
- World colored heavyweight champion (200+ lbs)

== See also ==
- List of heavyweight boxing champions
- List of people granted executive clemency in the first Trump presidency
- List of people pardoned or granted clemency by the president of the United States

== Notes ==
Awards and achievements
Preceded by Ed Martin	World Colored Heavyweight Championship; February 5, 1903 – December 26, 1908	Succeeded by Sam McVey; Won vacant title
Preceded by Tommy Burns	World Heavyweight Champion; December 26, 1908 – April 5, 1915	Succeeded by Jess Willard
Records
Preceded by Bob Fitzsimmons	Oldest World Heavyweight Champion; April 14, 1914 – January 4, 1919	Succeeded by Jess Willard
