= The Great Abraham Lincoln Pocket Watch Conspiracy =

2014 novel written by Jacopo della Quercia

- Author: Jacopo della Quercia
- Cover artist: Michael Koelsch
- Language: English
- Genre: Historical fiction
- Publisher: St. Martin's Griffin
- Publication date: 2014
- Publication place: United States
- Pages: 378
- ISBN: 978-1-250-02571-5

The Great Abraham Lincoln Pocket Watch Conspiracy is a historical fiction novel written by Jacopo della Quercia. The plot follows President William Howard Taft, scientist Robert Todd Lincoln (Abraham Lincoln's son), Secret Service Chief John Wilkie, Captain (later Major) Archibald Butt, and others as they slowly unravel a worldwide conspiracy over a decade in the making.

The book, which was della Quercia's debut novel, was published in 2014 by St. Martin's Griffin, an imprint of St. Martin's Press. The author described the book as not fitting into a single distinct genre, but as an "equal parts cocktail" of adventure, historical fiction, science fiction, thriller and comedy. In 2015, della Quercia released a spiritual sequel, License to Quill, of a similar nature that concerns the lives of Christopher Marlowe and William Shakespeare in Reformation-era Europe. The cover art was illustrated by pulp artist Michael Koelsch.

The book contains many references to actual events; some, such as the sinking of the RMS Titanic, are important plot points, while others, such as the destruction of the airship Erbslöh, are passively mentioned as news stories or memories. The author also includes excerpts from real newspaper articles, which are used to provide exposition. Similarly, all of the main characters in the book were real, relevant figures in the early 20th century; the characters' profiles were fictionalized to fit in with the book's plot and atmosphere, but their names, positions, occupations and personalities are kept largely intact.

== Plot ==
In 1910, Robert Todd Lincoln, an esteemed scientist, the only living son of former US President Abraham Lincoln, and a close friend of incumbent President William Howard Taft, reveals to the President that he has found an old pocket watch that belonged to his father. Lincoln explains that he can find no records of his father ever acquiring or owning the watch (though the watch fob was found on Abraham's person the night of his assassination), and although the watch has been running for a very long time, there is no inbuilt way to open or adjust it, and it has no discernible power source, save for a small cylinder of an unknown material. Furthermore, the watch bears a Russian inscription that translates to "Made in America", suggesting that the watch came from Russian America. Lincoln believes that the watch is so technologically advanced that it could not possibly have been built by humans, leading him to theorize that extraterrestrial beings are beginning to populate Alaska. Lincoln requests to use Taft's secret government zeppelin, Airship One, to travel to Alaska and test his hypothesis, which Taft gladly allows.

Meanwhile, while conversing with Nikola Tesla over a wireless telegraph, Airship One intercepts a mysterious exchange between five anonymous "gentlemen". The men are mining an unknown substance, which they will begin shipping around the world in approximately one year, and imply that they have just carried out a mass murder and that they are maintaining unknown operations in Belfast. After the transmission, Tesla is almost assassinated as part of the mass murder, but he kills the assassin with one of his inventions.

Once Taft, Lincoln, John Hays Hammond and Captain Archibald Butt, Airship One's pilot and Taft's closest friend, board Airship One to travel to Alaska, they hold a meeting in which they discuss recent events. They deduce that a malfunctioning automaton duplicate of Taft (constructed by Thomas Edison to allow the real Taft to engage in covert activities unnoticed, and which also is the origin of the rumor of Taft getting stuck in the White House bathtub) must have been programmed to kill Taft, as it repeatedly targeted him specifically. Lincoln reveals that on the same day that gas from Halley's Comet had been predicted to destroy all life on Earth, a mysterious deep blue light was seen in the night sky over the Wrangell Mountains in Alaska. This reinforces Lincoln's belief in extraterrestrial activity. Hammond, who has worked as the Guggenheims' chief mining engineer, tells the group that miners in the Wrangell Mines (the mines mentioned by the five "gentlemen") were constantly pressured to dig deeper and deeper, and that he believes that business moguls J. P. Morgan and Benjamin Guggenheim, who jointly owned and administered the mines, were secretly mining for a secret, unknown material. He remembers that what caused him to quit was suspicion that Morgan and Guggenheim were secretly working with the late Belgian King Leopold II, who was notorious for oppressing the natives of the Congo Free State. The expedition proves fruitless, as Lincoln and Taft do not find evidence of any extraterrestrial activity nor any information about the pocket watch.

Meanwhile, Wilkie and Wickersham travel to New York City to talk to J.P. Morgan, forcing him to send them all of his financial reports under threat of federal investigation. As Wilkie and Wickersham leave, they decide to have an elite female spy, Miss Knox, enter Morgan's enterprise as a mole, and it is implied that Morgan is the "Gentleman from New York" from Tesla's broadcast. After working as a personal aide to Morgan for months, Miss Knox finds clues indicating that Morgan's shipping trust, the International Mercantile Marine Company (specifically the White Star Line) is at the center of a smuggling operation, and she plans to have herself transferred to the Line.

Over the next year, Lincoln writes to scientists such as Theodor Wulf and Albert Einstein for information about the pocket watch and the blue light over the Wrangells. He finds out that the power source in the watch is made of lead, a material which can not create the necessary heat to power the watch. Lincoln also finds out that the Wrangell mountains possess large quantities of the radioactive element cesium, which may have been the cause of the blue light. He learns that Morgan and Guggenheim have begun shipping material out of the Wrangell mines, meaning that the operation the "gentlemen" were planning is going undeterred. An inquiry into the U.S. Steel Trust, which includes Morgan and the Guggenheims, has begun, and a criminal investigation of the trust is now certain. Captain Butt has been promoted to Major and is the President's new aide. One night in 1911, Lincoln suddenly remembers that his father accidentally left the pocket watch in Lincoln's room at the White House the night of the assassination. He rushes to Washington to tell the President that his father undoubtedly owned the watch. In the White House, as the Tafts are celebrating their 25th wedding anniversary, the Secret Service are distracted by a ruse, Taft's son Robert is kidnapped, and Taft is informed via note to come alone to the Skull and Bones tomb at Yale University. The note states that if Taft does not come, Robert will be killed, and that if he brings any military or Secret Service or alerts the university, New Haven, Connecticut will be destroyed by an unknown superweapon.

The night of the meeting, Taft enters the building alone, and is told by a man named Basil Zaharoff, who claims that he works neither for Morgan nor the Guggenheims, to sign a document abolishing the U.S. Constitution. Taft escapes his bonds and kills all of Zaharoff's mercenaries with his bare hands while Zaharoff escapes. Meanwhile, Lincoln, Wilkie and his Secret Service agents discover the superweapon in Yale's underground steam tunnels in the form of capsules of elemental cesium, which was mined in the Wrangells. Believing that the highly explosive cesium would be used to destroy the university with a large explosion, Lincoln collects the capsules to test them. Robert is rescued by a rescue team, and he and Taft return to the Airship. As they fly to Washington, it is deduced that Zaharoff was the "Gentleman from Paris" from the Tesla broadcast, and that Morgan and the Guggenheims could not have been responsible for the kidnapping. After testing the capsules, Lincoln realizes that the superweapon is not an explosive, but rather an aerosol; the steam tunnels would have been powered up, and the steam would have carried the extremely corrosive cesium up into New Haven, corroding the town away and killing all its citizens. It is also found that the militiamen who had fought the rescue team were from the Belgian Congo, and Taft and Lincoln travel to the Congo to investigate. The crew finds a house in the middle of the jungle that belongs to insane, murderous Belgian military officer Leon Rom, who is found to have been the "Gentleman from Boma". The crew kill Rom, but are taken aback by his level of psychosis.

Taft, Wilkie, Lincoln and several Secret Service agents travel to London for a meeting with an informant named "The Colossus" set up by Miss Knox. The Colossus (who turns out to be Sir Arthur Conan Doyle) reveals that Miss Knox, who has taken on the alias Violet Jessop, has found that the International Mercantile Marine is indeed smuggling materials across the Atlantic. After hearing that the pocket watch's power source is made of lead, Doyle explains that the watch was originally powered by uranium, and the lead is the uranium in its decayed state. The group soon realizes that the uranium, gold, copper in the watch and the gold-bearing quartz in the watch fob were all mined in Alaska, and Doyle guesses that the watch was constructed by Russian minister Eduard de Stoeckl to facilitate the Alaska Purchase by proving that the land contained precious materials. After learning that Zaharoff has a duplicate of the watch made from silver, Doyle guesses that Zaharoff stumbled upon the design for the watch and developed the idea for the superweapon, which he created from Alaskan uranium. Robert realizes that the blue lights in the sky over the Wrangells were caused by a test of the weapon, which was purposely performed when Earth passed by Halley's Comet to mask the effects. However, Robert realizes that, to do substantial damage, the superweapon would have to be the size of "three city blocks" and would require the use of steam. From this, Doyle realizes that the plan from the beginning has been to activate the superweapon via the steam tunnels of the RMS Titanic.

On April 14, 1912, Taft, Robert and Wilkie are aboard Airship One, First Lady Nellie Taft is aboard the SS Californian and Butt is already aboard the Titanic. Miss Knox, Major Butt, Taft, Wilkie, and the rescue team descend upon the ship to take it over, but are soon met with mercenaries who kill the captain and hold Taft hostage while engaging the rescue team. The men are greeted by J.P. Morgan and Leopold, the "Gentleman from Brussels", who had faked his death to escape disgrace.

Leopold reveals that he has killed Benjamin Guggenheim, who was the "Gentleman from Philadelphia" from the Tesla broadcast. Leopold has chosen to attack and destroy the United States with his weapon, because the United States was the first country to expose Leopold's brutalities in the Congo Free State. Crippling the United States will plunge the world into war, and when the great powers collapse, Zaharoff and Leopold will be purveyors of precious materials, making them the most powerful people on Earth. Taft escapes and runs after Leopold, while Wilkie and Lincoln are chased around by "Morgan", who is actually an android. As passengers take arms and fight Leopold's men, Airship One is shot down and crashes onto the deck. Robert shorts out the power on the ship, preventing use of the superweapon. As Taft and Wilkie prepare to leave, it is revealed to a shocked Taft that "Wilkie" is really ex-president Theodore Roosevelt. The Californian arrives to aid the Secret Service and rescue Taft and the others. Taft throws the badly wounded Roosevelt to a lifeboat, but before Taft can jump, the Titanic begins to rise out of the water. Leopold sees Taft jumping and prepares to shoot him, but Butt subdues the monarch as the rising waters rush over and kill them. Taft jumps off the ship and is reeled aboard the Californian.

Passengers aboard the Titanic who fought against Leopold are delivered to the U.S. and given new lives by the American and British governments. The public is told that the Titanic collided with an iceberg and sank, while the truth is kept a state secret. J.P. Morgan is forced to appear in court for an investigation of his "money trust", and dies from stress three months later. Butt is given a state funeral and is buried at Arlington National Cemetery. While Taft loses the 1912 presidential election, President Warren Harding offers him a position as Chief Justice of the United States in 1921. Taft and Lincoln are briefly reunited at the dedication of the Lincoln Memorial, where Robert tells Taft that the pocket watch had saved Robert's life on the Titanic by catching a bullet.

In 1936, a rich and healthy Zaharoff is living comfortably at the Hôtel de Paris in Monte Carlo. Zaharoff laments that working for Leopold had been a mistake, as Leopold relied too heavily on "lunatics" such as Rom and had ulterior motives. The importance of the watch to the initiation of Leopold's plan is revealed: Zaharoff discovered blueprints for the watch and, deducing from the uranium that the land in Alaska contained radioactive materials, invited Leopold to mine cesium there. As Zaharoff expresses his excitement over future weapons trade negotiations (which are implied to be with Adolf Hitler), he suddenly goes into convulsions as his maid, who is actually Miss Knox, poisons him. Miss Knox steals Zaharoff's silver watch and the watch plans and delivers them to Nellie Taft. Nellie mails the watch to Lyman James Briggs, chairman of the Uranium Committee along with a letter from President Franklin D. Roosevelt detailing the potential use of uranium as a weapon. As Nellie, who has always had a negative opinion of the Roosevelt family, ponders working with the new President Roosevelt, she reverses her anti-Roosevelt stand by stating, "I like these Roosevelts".

== Characters ==
=== Primary characters ===
William Howard Taft is the 27th President of the United States for most of the novel. Taft loves his wife, Nellie, more than anyone, and was deeply saddened during her period of extended illness. Nellie persuaded Taft to run for president so that she could influence Taft to implement her political agenda, though he desires to be Chief Justice. Throughout the book, he is shown to be in surprisingly good shape, despite his weight. He is not very knowledgeable in matters regarding science or history, but is surprisingly intelligent and deductive.

Robert Todd Lincoln is the only remaining son of former President Abraham Lincoln and a highly respected figure in the world of science. This is a departure from Lincoln's real-life profile, as in reality Lincoln was never involved in science. However, his lifelong interest in astronomy is faithfully depicted in the novel, as is his personal observatory at his Manchester mansion Hildene. Robert is always looking for information about his father's assassination; This desire causes Robert to discover the watch, thus setting the plot of the book in motion.

Archibald Butt is captain of Airship One and Taft's closest personal friend. After Taft's personal aide Charles Dyer Norton is fired, Taft personally hires Butt to take Norton's place. During the raids of New Haven and the Titanic, Butt is portrayed to be a talented strategist and commander, as shown when he expertly directs the sharpshooters to provide cover for the protagonists. Butt is shown to think a lot about his mother, and has a near-romantic relationship with Miss Knox.

Theodore Roosevelt is one of the most depicted characters in the book, but in most of his appearances he is disguised as Secret Service Chief John Wilkie. Roosevelt's wartime experience makes him a strong leader of the Secret Service, as demonstrated by his skills in combat. Roosevelt's resourcefulness is another distinguishing quality; Roosevelt is able to significantly damage the android by creating a makeshift Molotov cocktail, and is clever enough to short out the power by shooting Tesla's electric rifle at the android of J.P. Morgan. He is able to effectively fool Taft and the others with his disguise for several years, though he expresses disdain for Wilkie's habit of smoking cigars, which he must enact to maintain his disguise. Nellie Taft often voices her suspicion that Wilkie is a spy working for Theodore Roosevelt, which is, in a sense, true.

Miss Knox is an elite Secret Service agent. She is highly trained in martial arts and can easily get herself hired and transferred throughout companies as she pleases. She is one of the Secret Service's most talented agents, as shown by the effectiveness with which she investigates the White Star Line under the alias of Violet Jessop. In real life, after the Titanic sank, Violet Jessop served on its sister ships, the Olympic and the Britannic, suggesting that Miss Knox's character would have continued to monitor the Line even after the Taft administration is out of the White House.

=== Secondary characters ===
Nellie Taft is William Taft's loving wife. Although she loves her husband, it is said that the main reason she chose to marry him was that she believed he could ascend to the presidency. Nellie is portrayed as having much more political acumen than Taft, and as the real executive force of the Taft administration. She commissioned the construction of Airship One to keep Taft "distracted and away from the White House while she expertly [steers] the world into the 20th century".

Leopold II is a tyrannical former Belgian monarch. After establishing the Congo Free State, Leopold began to steal private-owned lands and kill their inhabitants. Leopold's crimes was exposed by an American historian, his empire collapsed, causing him to blame America for his being removed from power. He faked his death to escape excommunication and vowed revenge on the U.S. and the rest of the world, eventually drawing Zaharoff, Morgan and Guggenheim into his plan of revenge with promises of money and power. It is implied that Leopold only sought the millionaires so that he could use their money and power to support his plot, and would have killed them if the plot was successful.

Basil Zaharoff is a Greek arms dealer and the "Gentleman from Paris" from the Tesla broadcast. Zaharoff first conceptualized the superweapon after seeing the designs for the pocket watch, and developed it from the cesium mined in Alaska. He serves as the main facilitator of Leopold's plans.

George Wickersham is the Attorney General of the United States. Wickersham is faithful to the Taft administration and facilitates the prosecution of the Morgan-Guggenheim Syndicate. He is portrayed as a hotheaded, short-tempered man with endless respect for the law.

J.P. Morgan is a famous millionaire businessman. Drawn into Leopold's plan for world domination, Morgan believed that he would become even more powerful than he was; however, it is implied that Leopold has merely used Morgan for his wealth and power, planning to kill him once the plan is complete.

Benjamin Guggenheim is a world-renowned mining magnate. Though unseen in the novel, Guggenheim plays a key role in Leopold's plot by providing Leopold and Zaharoff access to his uranium mines. He was likely drawn into the plot just as Morgan was, and Leopold has him killed before he can claim his reward.

=== Historical figures ===
In addition to the above characters, The Great Abraham Lincoln Pocket Watch Conspiracy depicts or mentions a large number of historical figures:

- John Adams
- John Quincy Adams
- Albert, Prince Consort
- Alexander II of Russia
- Jane Herron Anderson
- Robert Anderson
- Thomas Andrews
- H. H. Asquith
- William F. Baker
- Robert Stawell Ball
- Richard A. Ballinger
- J. M. Barrie
- Nora Bayes
- Ludwig van Beethoven
- Bertram Boltwood
- John Wilkes Booth
- Walter Scott Bowen
- Lyman James Briggs
- Arthur Brooks
- John Brown
- Margaret Brown
- William Jennings Bryan
- James Bryce, 1st Viscount Bryce
- James Buchanan
- The Buffalo Soldiers
- Frank Burke (U.S. Secret Service)
- Samuel Butler
- Andrew Carnegie
- Fred W. Carpenter
- Roger Casement
- Benvenuto Cellini
- Théobald Chartran
- Salmon P. Chase
- House of Chigi
- Russell Henry Chittenden
- Joseph Conrad
- Marie Curie
- Leon Czolgosz
- Charles Darwin
- Belle da Costa Greene
- Leonardo da Vinci
- Jefferson Davis
- Eduard de Stoeckl
- Porfirio Díaz
- Charles Dickens
- Stephen A. Douglas
- Arthur Conan Doyle
- John Dryden
- Thomas Edison
- Clarence R. Edwards
- Albert Einstein
- Oskar Erbslöh
- Cyril Furmstone Evans
- Thomas Ewing, Jr.
- House of Fabergé
- Camille Flammarion
- Charles Forbes
- John T. Ford
- Rudolph Forster
- Sigmund Freud
- Galileo Galilei
- John Warne Gates
- George V
- Charles Dana Gibson
- Ulysses S. Grant
- Lloyd Carpenter Griscom
- The Guggenheim
- Arthur Twining Hadley
- John Hays Hammond
- Warren G. Harding
- Mary Eunice Harlan
- Clara Harris
- Sidney E. Hawley
- John Hay
- Rutherford B. Hayes
- William H. Hazel
- William Henkel
- Frank Harris Hitchcock
- Adolf Hitler
- Joseph Holt
- Homer
- Irwin "Ike" H. Hoover
- Harry Houdini
- Louis D. Huntoon
- J. Bruce Ismay
- Andrew Jackson
- James "Bell Bottom Jack" Jackson
- Elizabeth Jaffray
- Pierre Jaquet-Droz
- David Jayne Hill
- Richard "Dick" L. Jervis
- Andrew Johnson
- Jack Johnson
- Pope Julius II
- Laura Keene
- Lillian Smith Knox
- Philander C. Knox
- Henry I. Kowalsky
- Caroline Lacroix
- Le Pétomane
- Robert E. Lee
- Edward Baker Lincoln
- Jessie Harlan Lincoln
- Mamie Lincoln
- Mary Todd Lincoln
- Tad Lincoln
- William Wallace Lincoln
- John A. Logan
- Alice Roosevelt Longworth
- Stanley Lord
- Niccolò Machiavelli
- Franklin MacVeagh
- Dolley Madison
- Helen Taft Manning
- The Marx Brothers
- Groucho Marx
- Jimmy "Loafer" McAleer
- John Edward McCullough
- James A. McDevitt
- Deacon McGuire
- Charles Follen McKim
- William McKinley
- Georges Méliès
- Francis Davis Millet
- Wendell W. Mischler
- James Monroe
- Willis Luther Moore
- E. D. Morel
- Wolfgang Amadeus Mozart
- William McMaster Murdoch
- Joseph E. Murphy
- Musicians of the RMS Titanic
- Isaac Newton
- Nicholas II of Russia
- Charles Dyer Norton
- Richard Park
- John Frederick Parker
- Thomas F. Pendel
- Jack Phillips
- Allen Pinkerton
- William Pinkerton
- Pinturicchio
- Lewis Powell
- Arsène Pujo
- Raphael
- Henry Rathbone
- The Ringling brothers
- Morgan Robertson
- George H. Robinson
- Margaret Rogers
- Leon Rom
- Edith Roosevelt
- Franklin D. Roosevelt
- The Roosevelts
- Roman Rosen
- Rough Riders
- William Huntington Russell
- Ernest Rutherford
- Giovanni Schiaparelli
- George B. Schmucker
- Franz Schubert
- Charles M. Schwab
- John Singer Sargent
- Frances Adeline Seward
- Frederick Seward
- William H. Seward
- Upton Sinclair
- James "Jimmy" Sloan
- James S. Sherman
- William T. Sherman
- Edward Smith
- Herbert Knox Smith
- William Alden Smith
- Edwin M. Stanton
- Henry L. Stimson
- Anson Phelps Stokes
- Mary Surratt
- Charles Sweet
- Jonathan Swift
- The Tafts
- Alphonso Taft
- Charles Phelps Taft II
- Robert A. Taft
- Nikola Tesla
- Delia C. Torrey
- Lyman Trumbull
- Konstantin Tsiolkovsky
- Mark Twain
- Jules Verne
- Queen Victoria
- Kate Warne
- George Washington
- Martha Washington
- Pauline Wayne
- Gideon Welles
- Lucien C. Wheeler
- James Abbott McNeill Whistler
- Edward Douglass White
- Henry C. White
- Hubert L. Wigmore
- George Washington Williams
- Winnie "Mike" Williams
- Theodor Wulf
- Charles Young
- Cy Young

== Reception ==
The Great Abraham Lincoln Pocket Watch Conspiracy received very positive reviews. The novel was named a Favorite Read of 2014 by The Maine Edge, one of the Best Comedy Books of 2014 by Splitsider, and "one of the best reads of the year" by Ripley's Believe It or Not!. Book review magazine Kirkus Reviews called the novel "a good-fun entry point into the world of steampunk". Review aggregator website Goodreads showed a four-star rating, with reviews praising the cleverness of the storyline. Bestselling author Jonathan Maberry called the book "a dizzying and thoroughly riveting adventure" and "insanely entertaining", while author Marc Wortman states that the novel "stretches time and space across a carefully detailed past".

The novel's largest point of criticism is its incredibility. Charlotte Toledo of The Cauldron, the school newspaper for Cleveland State University, criticizing the action and plotline, calling them "far-fetched" and "preposterous," but acknowledged "that doesn’t subtract from the fact that this is an excellent novel, one that should be recommended." The Historical Novel Society noted that the readers' inevitable knowledge of many events depicted in the book ends their suspensions of disbelief.

== Promotion ==
To attract potential buyers, two chapters were released on the book's website: the first chapter and an "exclusive, online-only chapter" that does not appear in the book. The online chapter is set several months before the beginning of the book, and shows Miss Knox applying for her job at the Secret Service. After she is accepted, she reports to Nellie that Wilkie, a supporter of Roosevelt, does not have a picture of Taft hanging in his office, to which Nellie replies with her much-used phrase "I hate the Roosevelts".

Della Quercia also offered a limited supply of autographed copies of the novel, which could be ordered from the website The Book House of Stuyvesant Plaza, mailing out pages from the book's original manuscript with the first orders.
