= July 1910 =

Month of 1910

<<	July 1910					>>
Su	Mo	Tu	We	Th	Fr	Sa
					1	2
3	4	5	6	7	8	9
10	11	12	13	14	15	16
17	18	19	20	21	22	23
24	25	26	27	28	29	30
31

The following events occurred in July 1910:

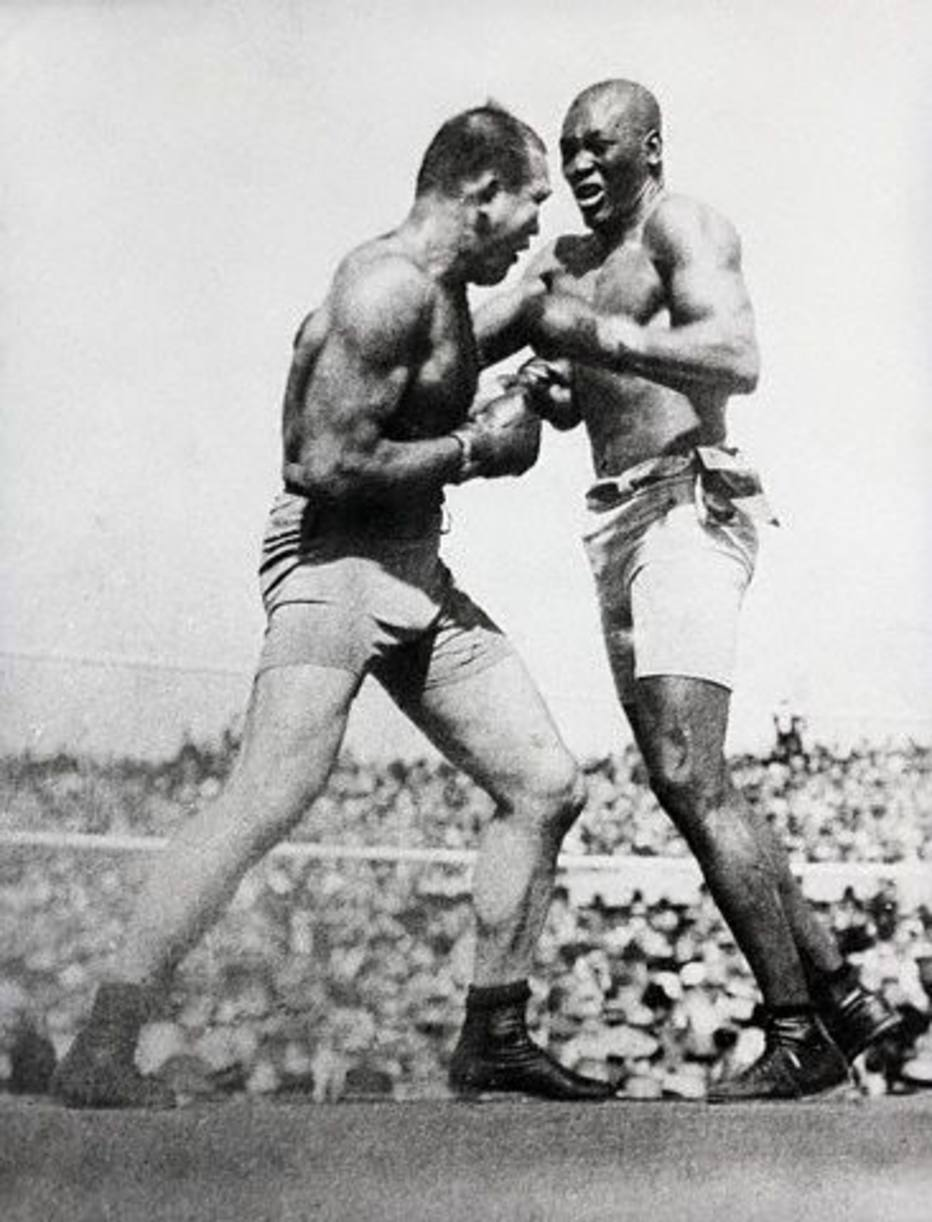
July 4, 1910: Black challenger Jack Johnson defeats White world heavyweight boxing champion James J. Jeffries in 15th round at Reno

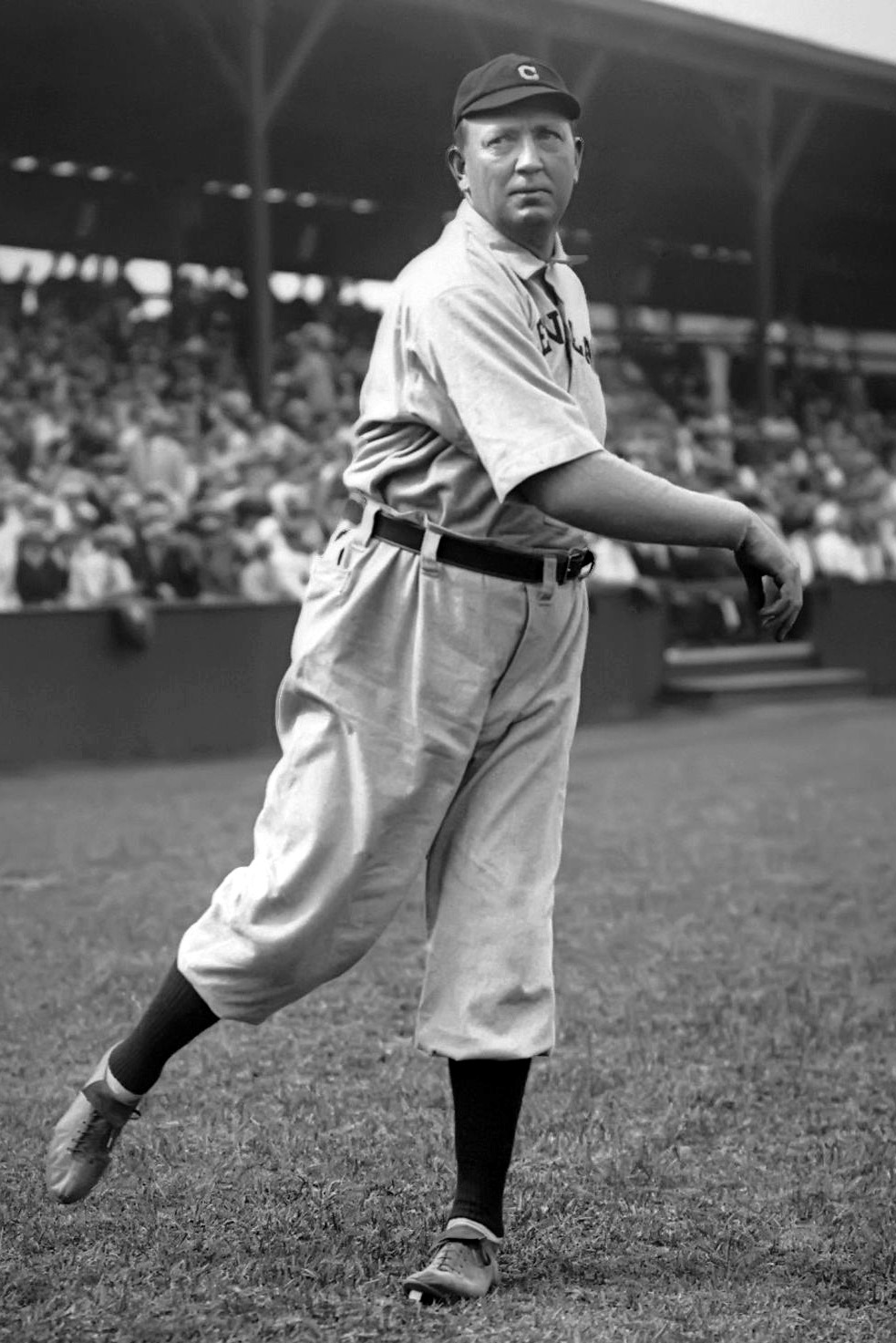
July 19, 1910: Major league pitcher Cy Young wins 500th game

== July 1, 1910 (Friday) ==
- The Chicago White Sox played their first game at Comiskey Park, losing to the St. Louis Browns 2–0. Eighty-one seasons later, the White Sox would play their last game there, on September 30, 1990, beating the Seattle Mariners, 2–1.
- Died: Joseph Thomas, 83, inventor of the hoop skirt.

== July 2, 1910 (Saturday) ==
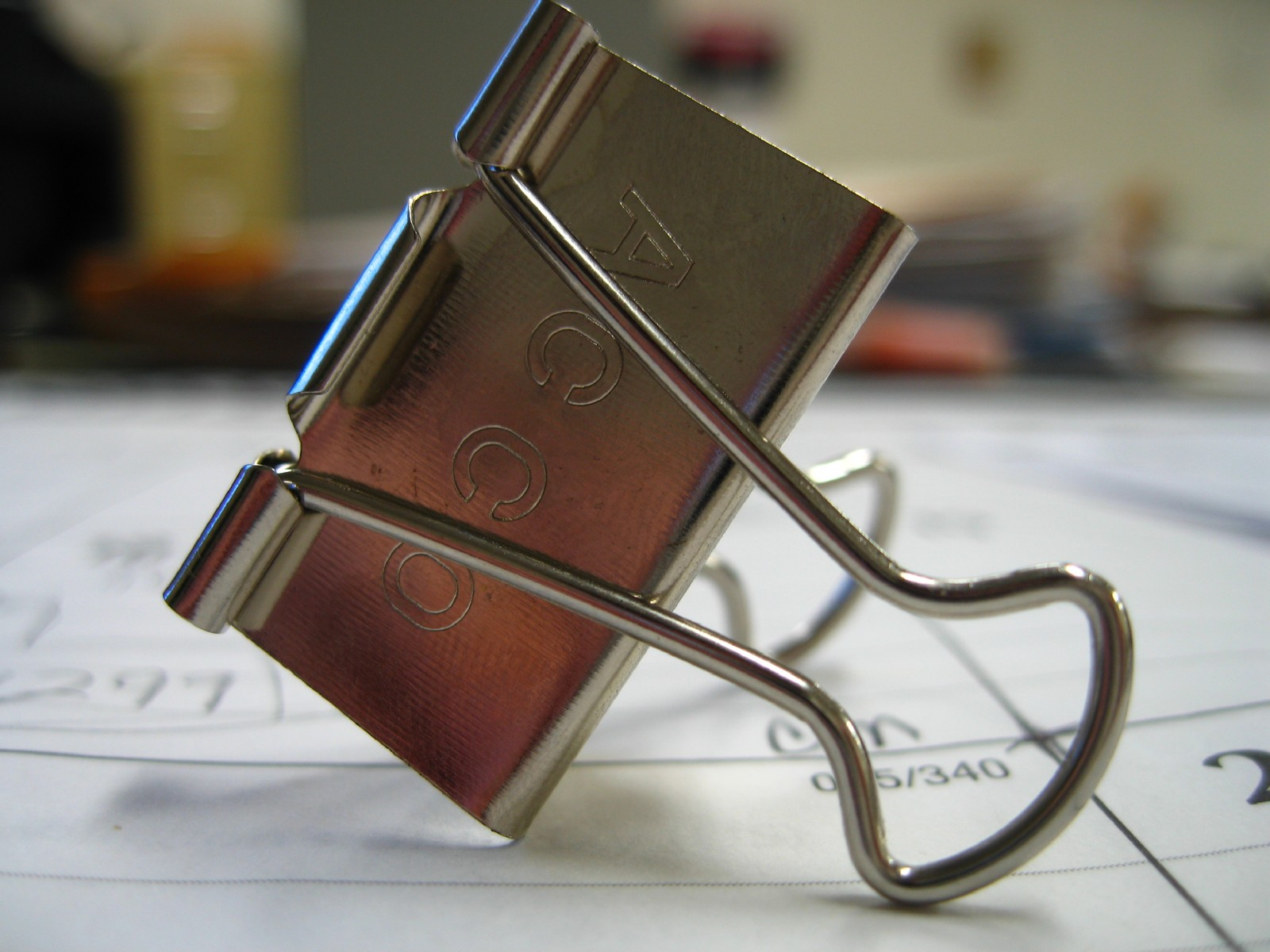
binder clip

- The patent application for the newly-invented binder clip was filed by Louis E. Baltzley of Washington, D.C., for a clip to bind multiple sheets of paper with "jaws for the reception of handles of spring metal comprising two arms having a tendency to spread laterally". U.S. patent no. 1,139,627 was granted on May 18, 1915, giving Baltzley exclusive rights for the manufacture and distribution of the office product until 1932. Essentially unchanged in its design, the binder clip continues to be used worldwide.
- U.S. President William Howard Taft first employed a new power authorized under the General Withdrawal Act of 1910, removing 8,495,731 acres (34,381.00 km^{2}) of Alaskan lands from public use.
- Charles K. Hamilton, known for making the first round trip airplane flight between New York City and Philadelphia (accomplished on June 13), flew the first airplane in Connecticut. A historical marker would be erected in 1970 in New Britain, Connecticut.
- Born: Morris Cohen (a/k/a Peter Kroger), American Communist who became a spy for the Soviet Union; in New York. After helping pass American atomic secrets to the Soviets in the 1940s, he and his wife, Lona Cohen, were given the cover of Peter and Helen Kroger, and spied against Britain's Royal Navy in the 1950s. (d. 1995)
- Died: Frederick James Furnivall, 85, co-creator of the Oxford English Dictionary

== July 3, 1910 (Sunday) ==
- At the second annual air show at Bétheny Plain in France, near Rheims, spectators watched the unprecedented sight of multiple (as many as 15) airplanes in the sky at the same time, "circling the track like a flight of great birds". The show was marred by the death of aviator Charles Wachter, whose Antoinette VII monoplane plunged from 500 feet (150 m) after the wings collapsed.
- Born: Esau Jenkins, African-American educator and founder of "citizenship school" movement to assist black voter registration; in Johns Island, South Carolina (d. 1972)

== July 4, 1910 (Monday) ==
- In one of the most eagerly anticipated boxing matches of all time, the first African-American challenger for the World Heavyweight Championship of boxing, Jack Johnson defeated the man whom writer Jack London described as "the chosen representative of the white race, and this time the greatest of them", taking the crown from heavyweight champion James J. Jeffries in the fifteenth round of their bout in Reno, Nevada. One hour and 14 rounds after the fight began at 1:30 pm PST, Jeffries— who boasted that he had never been knocked down in a fight— fell three times to Johnson's punches, and was being counted out when his manager called the fight. A crowd of 18,020 attended, and telegraphed reports were followed across the nation. Johnson and Jeffries both made over $100,000 from the purse, bonuses, and the sale of film rights.
- In St. Petersburg, Russia and Japan signed a treaty in which they divided their "spheres of influence" in Manchuria (where both nations were building railroads) and in the rest of Asia. Japan annexed Korea the next month, with no objection from Russia.
- Klaus Berntsen became the new Prime Minister of Denmark.
- A "safe and sane" public education program reduced the number of serious injuries and deaths during the Fourth of July by more than 40 percent. There were 24 deaths and 1,294 injuries, down from 44 and 2,361 for July 4, 1909.
- Nineteen people were killed in a train collision at Middletown, Ohio.
- Born:
  - Robert K. Merton, American sociologist and social theorist; as Meyer R. Schkolnick, in Philadelphia (d. 2003)
  - Gloria Stuart, American actress, whose films included Air Mail (1932) and Titanic (1997); in Santa Monica, California (d. 2010)
- Died:
  - Giovanni Schiaparelli, 75, Italian astronomer who first discovered canal-like markings on the planet Mars
  - Melville Fuller, 77, Chief Justice of the United States.

== July 5, 1910 (Tuesday) ==
- Cities across America prohibited the exhibition of films of the Johnson-Jeffries bout, after at least ten people had been killed in racial violence that followed the fight. Authorities implemented bans in Washington, Atlanta, Baltimore, St. Louis and Cincinnati. At Ogden, Utah, three white men cursed Johnson at a railway station and attempted to board his private train car, before being turned back by one of Johnson's trainers. In Washington, police arrested 236 people, mostly African-American.
- North Carolina Central University, a historically black university in Durham, North Carolina, near Duke University, held its first classes.
- Wilhelm Beckert, formerly Germany's Minister to Chile, was executed by a firing squad in Santiago after his conviction of the February 5, 1909 murder of a Chilean employee. Beckert, who had embezzled embassy funds and set fire to the building in hopes of covering up the crime, was tried in a Chilean court after the German government waived objections to his trial.

== July 6, 1910 (Wednesday) ==
- The U.S. government won its first suit against the manufacture of bleached flour, under the Pure Food and Drug Act. Since 1905, the Alsop process had used nitrogen peroxide, which made wheat flour snow white, but removed the nutrients. Bleaching became permissible again after the FDA mandated vitamin enrichment of wheat flour.
- Burke County, North Dakota, was established.
- The city of Redmond, Oregon, was incorporated.

== July 7, 1910 (Thursday) ==
- King Alfonso XIII of Spain approved legislation to stop further religious orders from entering Spain. The Vatican protested the action four days later.
- Nadir of American race relations: Only three days after the Johnson-Jeffries fight, various states and cities in the United States declared they would not allow the screening of the footage. The picture was banned virtually everywhere in the southern United States.
- President Taft ordered the withdrawal of 35,073,164 acres (141,936.06 km^{2}) of coalfield lands, in the western United States, from public use, with nearly half of it in North Dakota.
- The first gold importation since the Panic of '07 began in New York City.
- The village of Cuyuna, Minnesota—named by prospector Cuyler Adams for himself and his dog Una—was incorporated.
- The town of Bucoda, Washington—-named for J.M. Buckley, Sam Coulter, and J.B. David—-was incorporated.

== July 8, 1910 (Friday) ==
- Vinayak Damodar Savarkar, a leader in the Indian independence movement, escaped his imprisonment on the mail ship S.S. Morea, and then swam to Marseille. Savarkar reached the jurisdiction of France, but was recaptured by three men from the Morea, and taken back to British custody. "The Savarkar Case" became an international incident over the violation of France's sovereignty by the United Kingdom, and was taken to the International Court of Justice, which ruled that the British government was not required to return Savarkar to the French government.
- In what has been described as "the beginning of performance art", Filippo Tommaso Marinetti dropped 800,000 leaflets from the Clock Tower in Venice with his manifesto "Against Traditional Venice".
- The New York American broke the story that a combination of Wall Street bankers would be working for the Princeton University's president, Woodrow Wilson, to be the Democratic Party nominee for president in 1912, with a trial run for Governor of New Jersey.
- Died: Alexander Burgener, 65, Swiss mountaineer, was killed in an avalanche

== July 9, 1910 (Saturday) ==
- Walter Brookins became the first person to fly an airplane to an altitude of more than one mile (1.6 km). After taking off from Atlantic City, Brookins reached an altitude of 6,175 feet (1,882 m) at 6:17 p.m., the mark being verified by triangulation from ground observers. The previous record, also set by Brookins, had been 4,939 feet (1,505 m).
- Born: Govan Mbeki, South African Communist, anti-apartheid activist, Secretary and co-founder of Umkhonto we Sizwe, and father of President of South Africa Thabo Mbeki; in Mpukane, Union of South Africa (d. 2001)

== July 10, 1910 (Sunday) ==
- A famous poem with the words "Tinker to Evers to Chance" (actual title "Baseball's Sad Lexicon") was first seen, written by Franklin P. Adams of the New York Evening Mail, in his column "Always in Good Humor". The baseball players referred to were in the infield of the Chicago Cubs—shortstop Joe Tinker, second baseman Johnny Evers, and first baseman Frank Chance, who played together from 1902 to 1912.
- The village of Acme, Alberta, was incorporated.
- Died: Johann Galle, German astronomer who made the first observation of the planet Neptune.

== July 11, 1910 (Monday) ==
- Enforcement of the Pure Food and Drug Act continued, as U.S. Marshals seized 4.5 million ice cream cones from a warehouse in New York, after finding that samples were contaminated with boric acid.
- The New Brunswick towns of Campbellton and Richardsville were destroyed by fire that spread from the Richards Company Shingle Mills to adjacent buildings.
- Born: Marcel de Kerviler, French naval officer and Olympic sailor; in Angers, Maine-et-Loire, France (d. 1989)
- Died: Henry Dexter, founder of American News Company

== July 12, 1910 (Tuesday) ==
- The heaviest rainfall in 24 hours in the history of India—838 millimetres (33.0 in)—fell at Cherrapunji. That record would stand for 95 years, until June 25, 2005, when 944 millimetres (37.2 in)) killed more than 25 people in Mumbai.
- Aviator Charles Stewart Rolls was killed at Bournemouth after his airplane suddenly dropped from a height of 40 feet (12 m). His partnership with Henry Royce effectively came to an end, but the automobile company that the two entrepreneurs designed, and Rolls's name lives on in the Rolls-Royce.
- A body, believed to be that of missing actress Belle Elmore Crippen, was found by London police at the home, on 39 Hilldrop Crescent, that she had shared with her husband, Dr. Hawley Harvey Crippen. Dr. Crippen had fled the scene three days earlier after one interview with police, and Belle Elmore had not been seen since February.
- Died: Charles Stewart Rolls, 32, Welsh motoring and aviation pioneer, was killed in an airplane crash.

== July 13, 1910 (Wednesday) ==
- All five persons on board the German dirigible Erbslöh, including inventor Oskar Erbslöh, were killed when its gasoline-powered engine exploded at an altitude of 480 metres (1,570 ft) over Leichlingen. The crew had been testing the airship in preparation for passenger service. A log kept by the engineer noted at 9:09 am the ship's altitude five minutes after takeoff.
- Women's Wear Daily published its first issue.

== July 14, 1910 (Thursday) ==
- After two days of fighting, Portuguese troops defeated a large band of pirates on the island of Colowan, near Macao.
- The village of Brooks, Alberta was incorporated.
- Born: William Hanna, American animator, co-founder of Hanna-Barbera; in Melrose, New Mexico (d. 2001)
- Died: Marius Petipa, 92, "father of classical ballet"

== July 15, 1910 (Friday) ==
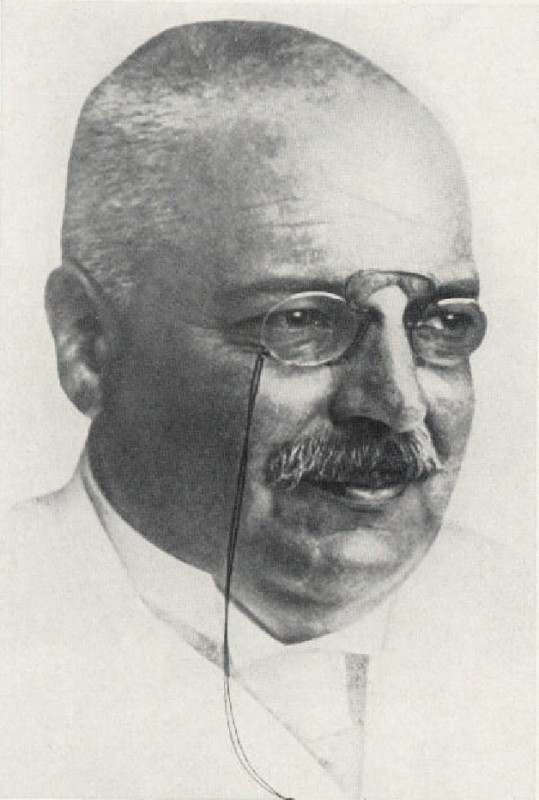
Dr. Alzheimer

- Alzheimer's disease was first given that name with the publication, in Leipzig, of the treatise Einführung in die psychiatrische Klinik (Guide to Clinical Psychiatry, 8th edition), by Dr. Emil Kraepelin. On page 624, Dr. Kraepelin summarized the studies of presenile and senile dementia made by Dr. Alois Alzheimer, and used the phrase "Alzheimers Krankheit".
- In Kraków, at the celebration of the 500th anniversary of the Battle of Grunwald, composer Jan Paderewski presented the statue of Wladislaw II Jogaila, King of Poland At the same celebration, the first singing of Rota, a song incorporating a poem by Maria Konopnicka, was made.
- Carlos Eugenio Restrepo was elected President of Colombia.

== July 16, 1910 (Saturday) ==
- In the first public trip of the new "mono-railroad" in New York City fell on its side, injuring at least 14 of the 100 passengers on board.
- The Duigan pusher biplane, constructed by the Duigan Brothers (John and Reg) as the first airplane ever built in Australia, was flown by aviator John Robertson Duigan, at their parents' farm at Mia Mia, Victoria.
- Voters in Andrews County, Texas, participated in a referendum to decide the county seat. The city of Andrews, rather than Shafter Lake, became the permanent location of county offices.

== July 17, 1910 (Sunday) ==
- Japan notified the European nations that commercial treaties, limiting tariffs, would all expire within one year of the announcement.

== July 18, 1910 (Monday) ==
- The towns of Clocolan, South Africa, and Kenaston, Saskatchewan, Canada, were incorporated.
- Born: Mamadou Dia, the first Prime Minister of Senegal (1957–1962); in Kombolé, French West Africa (d. 2009)
- Died: Samuel Gilmore, U.S. Representative from Louisiana.

== July 19, 1910 (Tuesday) ==
- In Washington, D.C., Cy Young of the Cleveland Naps became the first— and to date, the only— Major League Baseball pitcher to record 500 wins, in a 5–2 win over the Washington Senators. Young would finish with 511 wins in his career, with Walter Johnson second at 417 wins. Of current players, Tom Glavine and Randy Johnson have 305 and 303 wins respectively.
- In the German town of Friedrichshafen, the plant at Carbonium PLC, created in 1909 to supply hydrogen gas to Luftschiffbau Zeppelin, exploded, and was not rebuilt until 1914.

== July 20, 1910 (Wednesday) ==
- Governor Beryl F. Carroll of Iowa was indicted by a grand jury for criminal libel. Carroll would be acquitted and re-elected in November, serving until 1913.
- The Emerald City of Oz, the sixth in the series of books by L. Frank Baum, was published.
- Colombia celebrated the centennial of its independence.

== July 21, 1910 (Thursday) ==
- Roque Sáenz Peña became President of Argentina.
- The explosion of a 12-inch (300 mm) gun at Fort Monroe killed eleven soldiers.

== July 22, 1910 (Friday) ==
- Cri de Paris reported that da Vinci's painting La Giaconda, more popularly known as "the Mona Lisa", had been stolen from the Louvre a month earlier, with a copy being substituted for the original. Although the incident was a false alarm, the painting would be stolen in 1911, and not returned until 1913.
- Dr. Hawley Harvey Crippen, sought by Scotland Yard for the murder of his wife Belle, was recognized by the captain of the ship SS Montrose. Captain Henry George Kendall telegraphed the headquarters of the White Star Line, which in turn notified Inspector Walter Dew.
- The city of Tracy, California, was incorporated.

== July 23, 1910 (Saturday) ==
- The Japanese steamer Tetsurei foundered near Jindo Island off of Korea, with a loss of 210 of its 250 passengers.
- The city of Milan was battered by a tornado that killed more than 60 people and caused millions of dollars of damage to the Italian city.

== July 24, 1910 (Sunday) ==
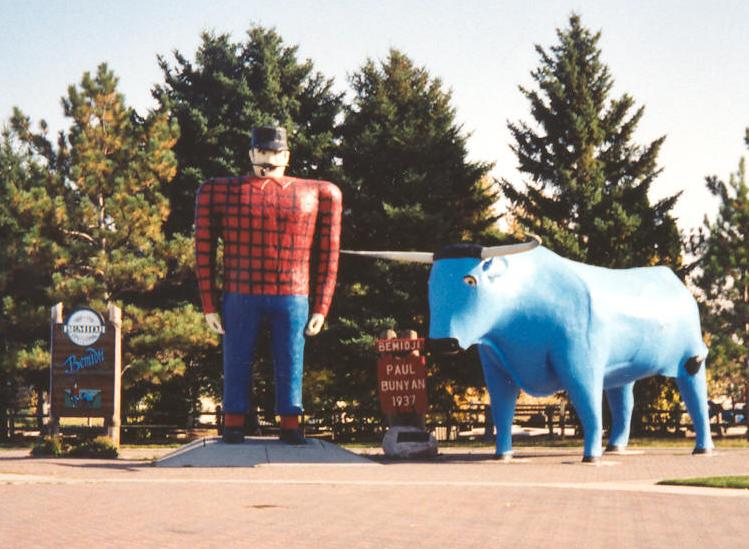
Paul Bunyan and Babe

- Author James MacGillivray brought the legend of Paul Bunyan into national prominence, adapting various lumber camp tales into stories for children as part of a series in the Detroit News-Tribune. Later writers, particularly W.B. Laughead and Esther Shepherd, added to the American mythology of the gigantic lumberjack and his large blue ox, Babe, and Paul Bunyan would be celebrated in the works of Robert Frost, Carl Sandburg, W.H. Auden and others.
- Mayor A.H. Bousman of Ridgeway, Virginia, was killed after a bomb was thrown into his yard. Bousman, whose legs were blown off by the explosion, died half an hour later.

== July 25, 1910 (Monday) ==
- A sudden downpour at the Hungarian town of Diósd caused flash flooding of the Danube River, drowning at least 25 people.

== July 26, 1910 (Tuesday) ==
- Prices on the New York Stock Exchange dropped dramatically, with 110 of 146 issues hitting record lows for 1910.
- Mirza Hasan Ashtiani Mostowfi ol-Mamalek was appointed as Prime Minister of Persia for the first time, and began a campaign against the power of the Mujahideen rebels. Mostowfi would serve on multiple occasions between 1910 and 1927.
- The comic strip characters of Krazy Kat and "Ignatz Mouse" first did battle, as a companion feature to George Herriman's strip The Dingbat Family. The cat and the brick-throwing mouse would become so popular that Krazy Kat would be syndicated as its own strip.

== July 27, 1910 (Wednesday) ==
- British aviator Claude Grahame-White flew his airplane over the Royal Navy fleet assembled at Mount's Bay, and buzzed the flagship of Admiral of the Fleet Sir William May in order to make a point about the lack of defence that ships would have against an aerial attack.
- Newspaper publisher Warren G. Harding was nominated as the Republican candidate for Governor of Ohio, but not until the third ballot taken of delegates. President Taft, who had received fellow-Ohioan Harding as a guest at the White House in February, wired his congratulations to the GOP party nominee. The future President would lose to incumbent Democrat Judson Harmon in November.
- Lilburn, Georgia, was incorporated as a city.
- Born:
  - Julien Gracq (real name Louis Poirier), French surrealist; in Saint-Florent-le-Vieil, Maine-et-Loire département (d. 2007)
  - Lupita Tovar, Mexican-American actress; in Matías Romero, Oaxaca (d. 2016)

== July 28, 1910 (Thursday) ==
- The El Dorado National Forest was established in California by proclamation of U.S. President Taft.
- The "Keystone Party" was founded in Pennsylvania, as an alternative to the Republicans and Democrats.

== July 29, 1910 (Friday) ==
- As Spain's King Alfonso and Prime Minister Canalejas severed relations with the Vatican, Carlist Pretender to the Spanish throne, Don Jaime, sent a message to his followers saying that "I think the day is not far distant when my followers must rally to our flag, and I will lead the battle."
- Rioting broke out in Palestine, Texas, with at least 18 African-Americans killed.

== July 30, 1910 (Saturday) ==
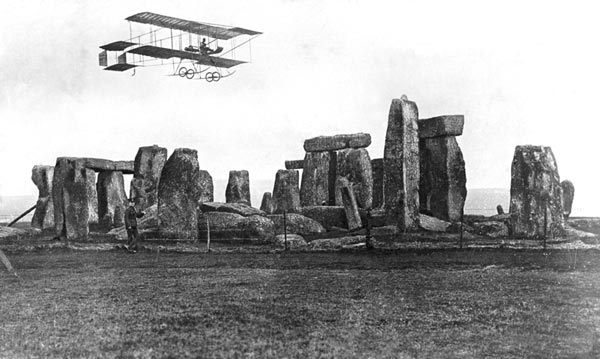
The Bristol Boxkite

- The Bristol Boxkite, the first British manufactured airplane (Bristol Aeroplane Company), made its first flight. Through mergers, the company was consolidated into what is now BAE Systems.
- Isidore Bloom, a 7-year-old boy, fell from the roof of his five-story apartment in New York City but survived by falling on clotheslines. Four lines snapped, but Isidore managed to catch and hold on to the fifth.

== July 31, 1910 (Sunday) ==
- After arriving in Canada as a passenger on the SS Montrose, Dr. Hawley Harvey Crippen was arrested by Inspector Walter Dew of Scotland Yard for the murder of his wife, Belle. Crippen, an American citizen, had made the mistake of taking a ship to Canada, where Dew had jurisdiction as a British officer, rather than to the United States. Crippen would be executed, in England, four months later.
- Split Rock Lighthouse was first lit. Located in Minnesota at Lake Superior, the lighthouse remained in service until 1969, and is now part of a state park of the same name. It is one of the most photographed lighthouses in the world.
- Died:
  - John G. Carlisle, 74, former Speaker of the United States House of Representatives
  - Charles Q. Tirrell, Massachusetts Congressman
