= June 1910 =

Month of 1910

<<	June 1910					>>
Su	Mo	Tu	We	Th	Fr	Sa
			1	2	3	4
5	6	7	8	9	10	11
12	13	14	15	16	17	18
19	20	21	22	23	24	25
26	27	28	29	30

The following events occurred in June 1910:

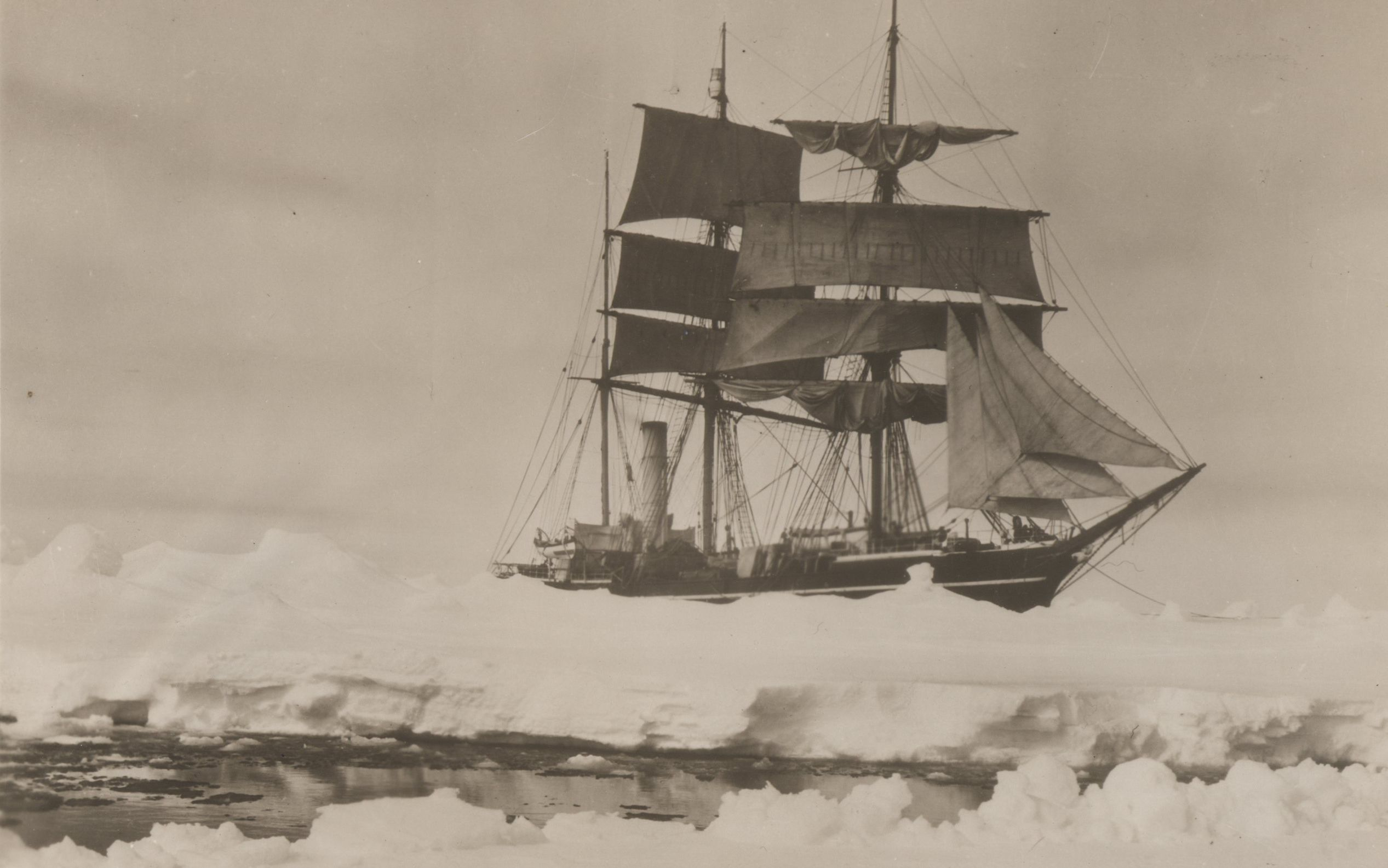
June 1, 1910: Scott's Terra Nova departs for Antarctica

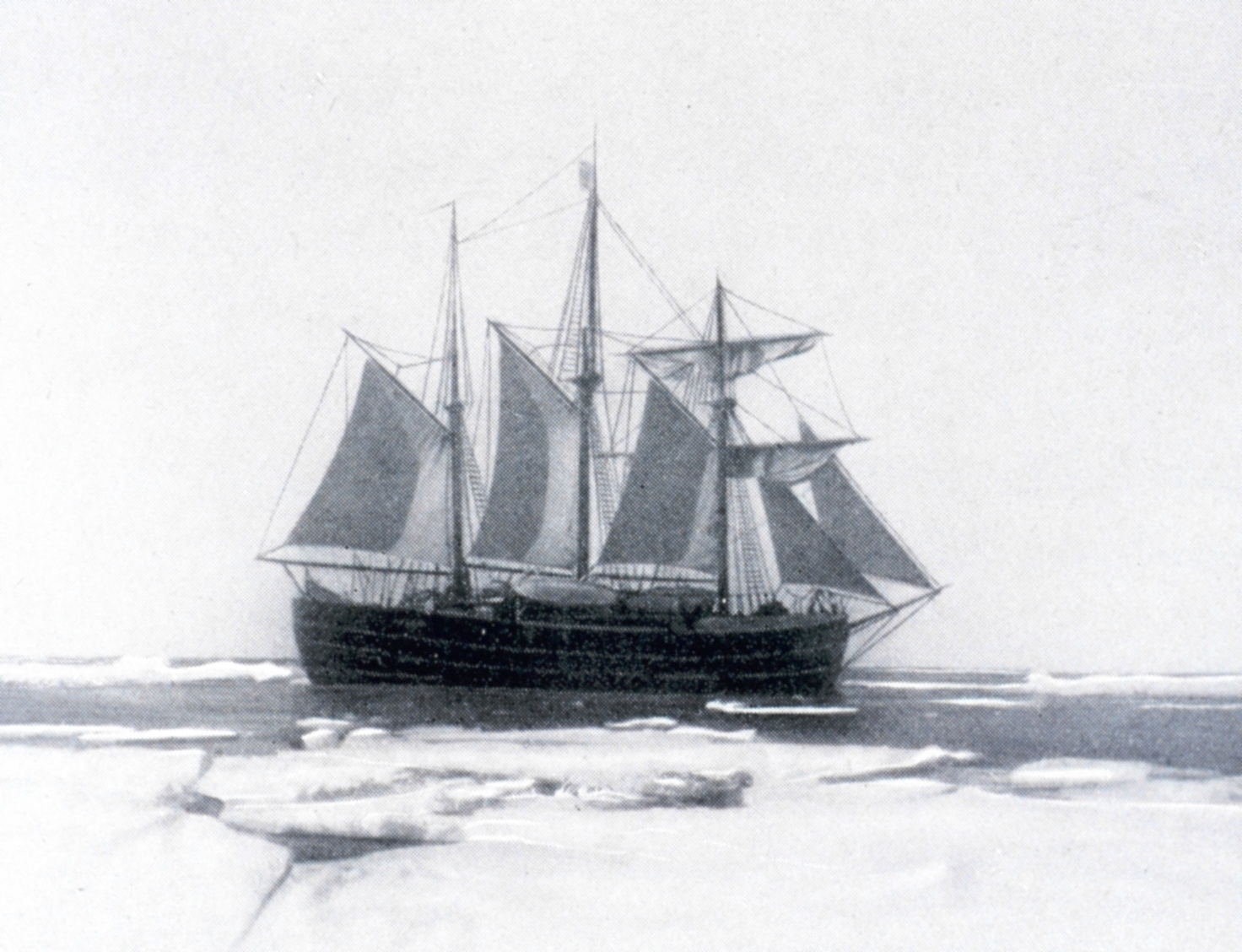
June 3, 1910: Amundsen's Fram departs for Antarctica

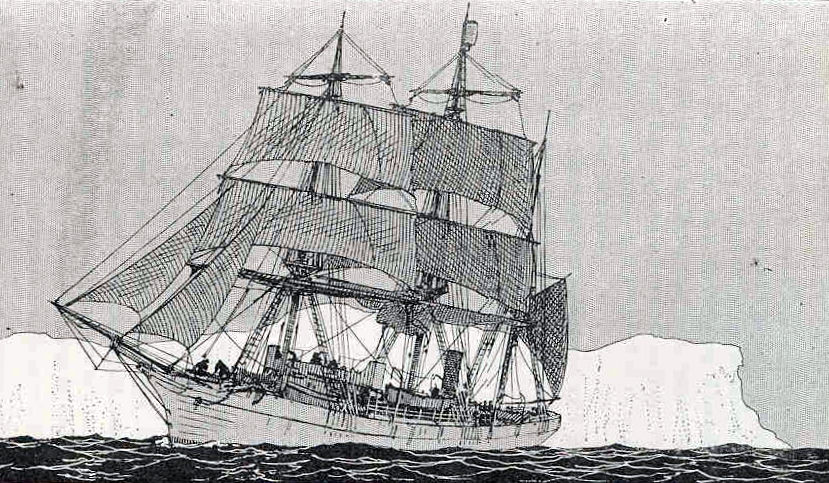
June 5, 1910: Charcot's Pourquoi Pas? returns from Antarctica

== June 1, 1910 (Wednesday) ==
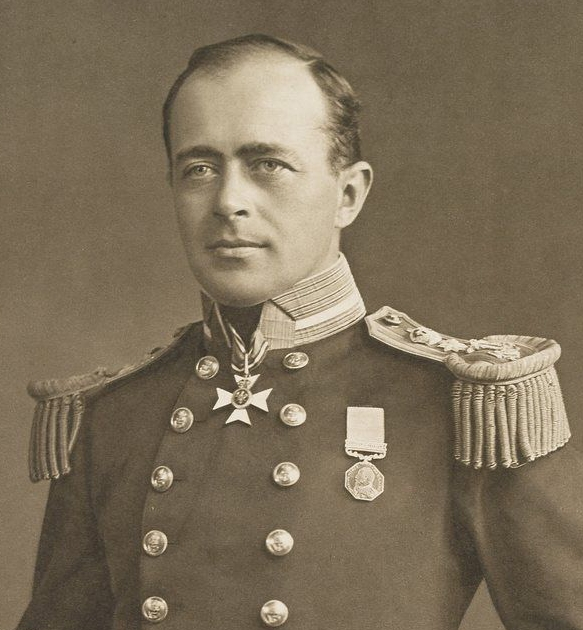
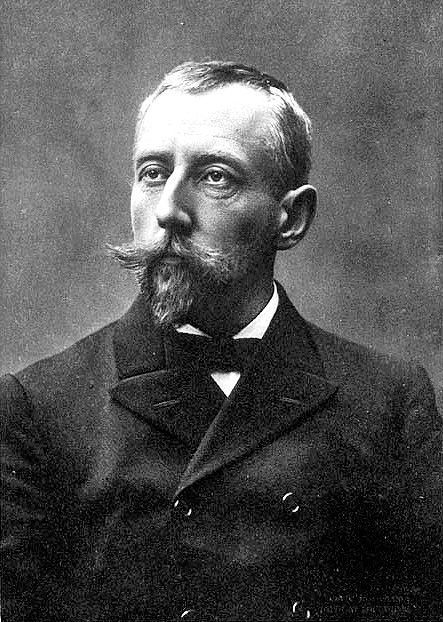
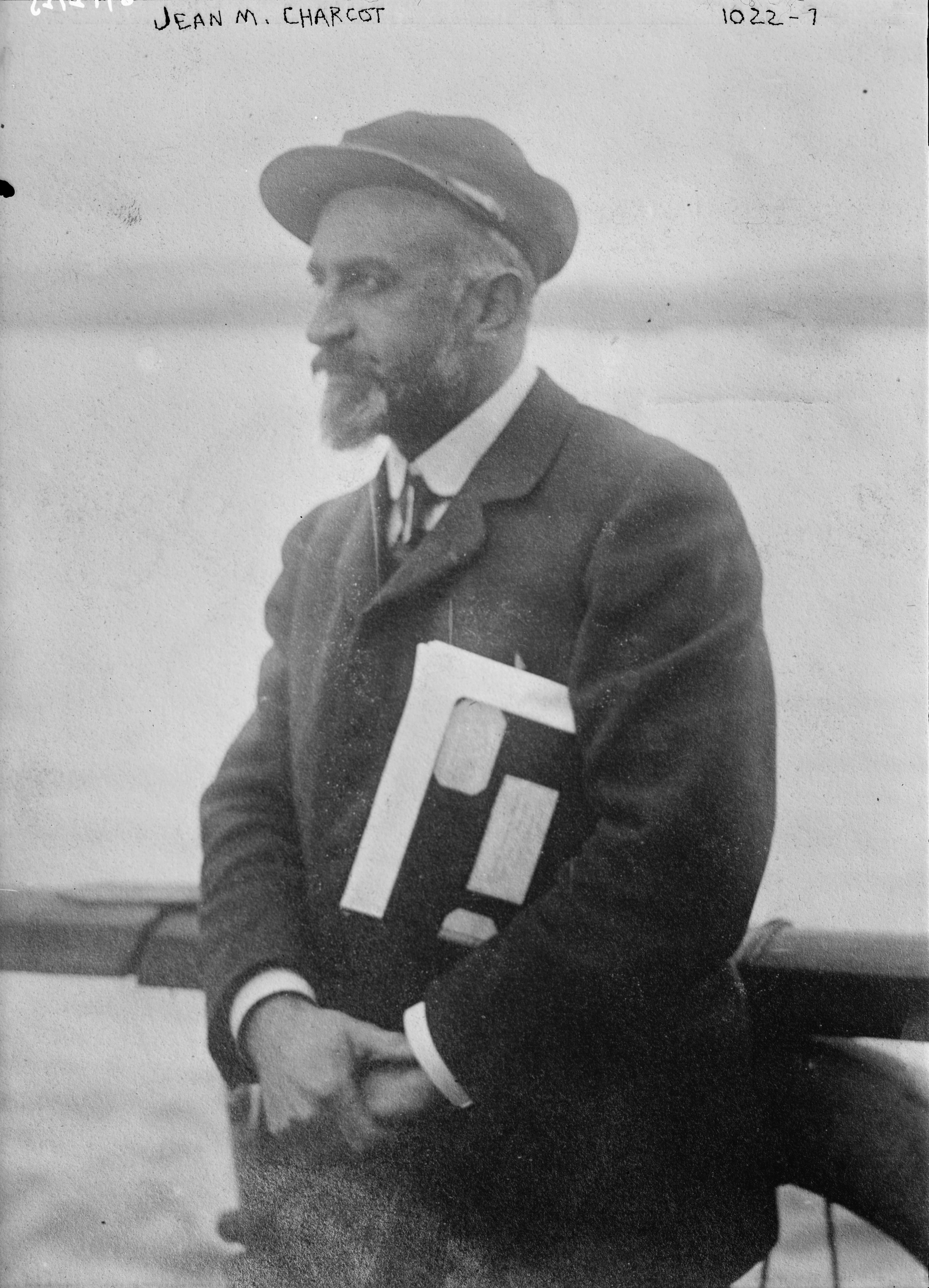
Robert Scott, Roald Amundsen and Jean-Baptiste Charcot
- The British Antarctic Expedition, led by Captain Robert Falcon Scott on the steamer Terra Nova, departed from London with 55 people and a goal of reaching the South Pole in December.
- The first white settlements on the banks of Alaska's Iditarod River were made when a steamer brought gold prospectors to within eight miles (13 km) of a gold strike. By August, there were two towns, each with 2,000 people: Iditarod and Flat.

== June 2, 1910 (Thursday) ==
- Charles Stewart Rolls became the first person to fly across the English Channel and back again without stopping. Rolls took off from Dover and turned around over Sangatte in France, then returned to England after 90 minutes aloft.
- Elections were held in Hungary, granting the ruling parties a larger majority in Parliament.
- In fiction, June 2, 1910, is the date of Quentin Compson's suicide in William Faulkner's novel, The Sound and the Fury.

== June 3, 1910 (Friday) ==
- The Norwegian Antarctic Expedition, led by Roald Amundsen on the steamer Fram, departed from Christiania (now Oslo) without fanfare, and no announcement until later in the year of Amundsen's intention to reach the South Pole.
- Ecuador and Peru withdrew their troops from the border between the two nations as the first step in the mediation of their dispute.

== June 4, 1910 (Saturday) ==
- A group of Mayan Indian rebels attacked the town of Valladolid in Mexico's Yucatán, killed 40 people, including local police. The navy gunboat Morelos was dispatched from Vera Cruz to Mérida with 600 troops.
- A ballet adaptation of Nikolai Rimsky-Korsakov's symphonic suite, Scheherazade, was first presented, by the Ballets Russes in Paris.
- Harvey Cushing performed his first sublabial submucosal trans-sphenoidal approach while Oskar Hirsch first performed his submucosal trans-sphenoidal operation endonasally.

== June 5, 1910 (Sunday) ==
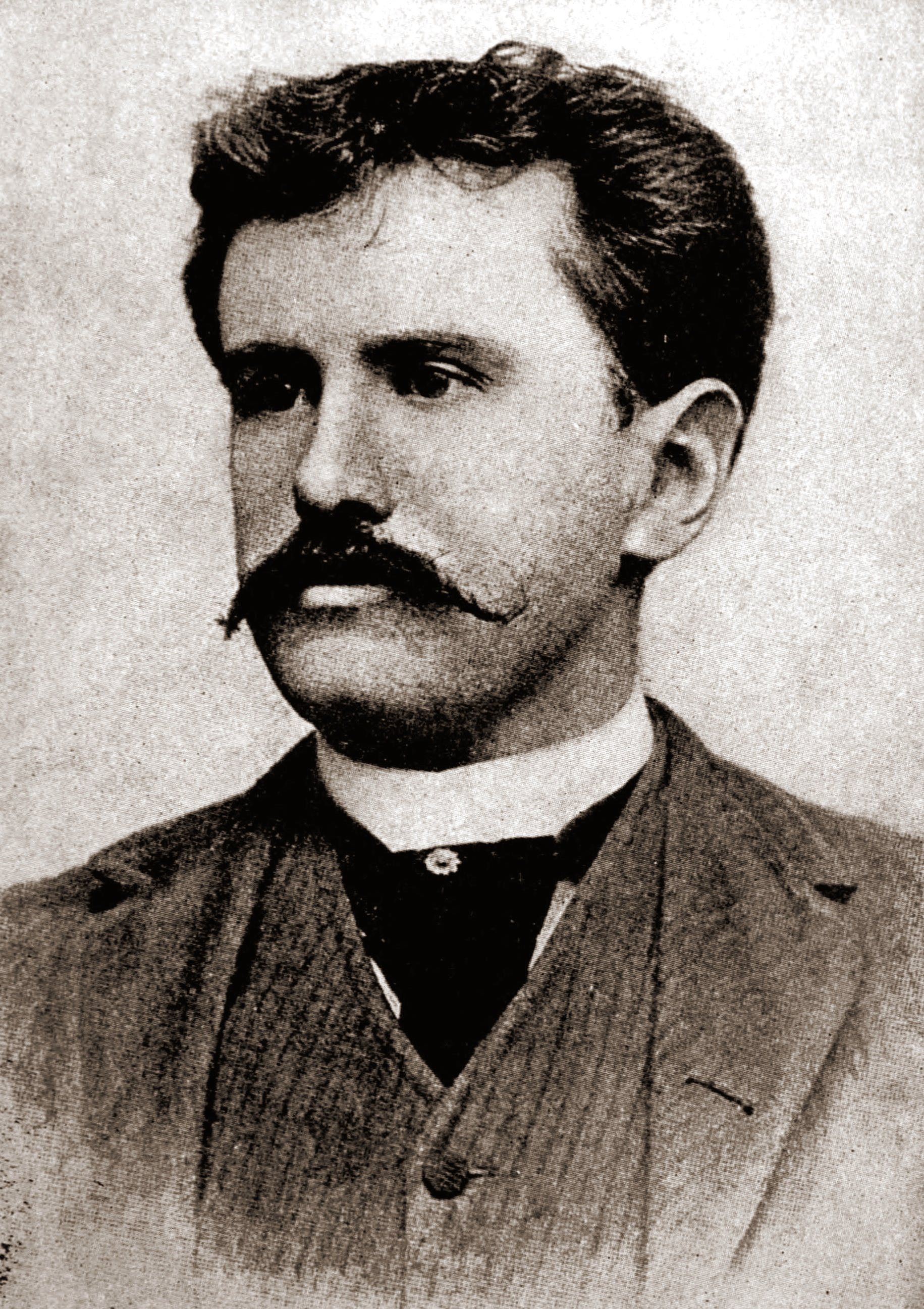
O. Henry

- William Sidney Porter, who, under the pen name O. Henry, was one of the most popular story writers in America, died in New York City at the age of 47. O. Henry, who suffered from cirrhosis of the liver and diabetes, had published more than 250 stories in his lifetime, and more after his death. Despite a large income from his writing, he was continuously broke.
- Jean-Baptiste Charcot and the crew of the Antarctic exploring ship Pourquoi-Pas returned to a hero's welcome in France, during the same week Robert Scott and Roald Amundsen were beginning their expeditions to the South Pole.
- The Nanking Exposition, an official world's fair hosted by the Imperial government, opened in China.

== June 6, 1910 (Monday) ==
- President Taft met with the presidents of the Western railroads, and then the next day with the Presidents of the Pennsylvania Railroad, New York Central and Southern Railway. All the companies agreed to suspend proposed rate increases.

== June 7, 1910 (Tuesday) ==
- An earthquake that struck Southern Italy at 3:00 a.m. killed scores of people.
- Mexican troops were dispatched to suppress an uprising by the Maya Indians in Yucatán.
- The towns of Byron, Wyoming, and Bucoda, Washington, were both incorporated.

== June 8, 1910 (Wednesday) ==
- Born:
  - John W. Campbell, American science fiction pioneer, editor of Astounding Science Fiction magazine; in Newark, New Jersey (d. 1971)
  - C.C. Beck, American comic book author, primarily of Captain Marvel; in Zumbrota, Minnesota (d.1989)

== June 9, 1910 (Thursday) ==
- The Prince Arthur, Duke of Connaught and Strathearn, and uncle of King George V of the United Kingdom, was announced as the successor to Earl Grey as Governor General of Canada.
- Japan and Russia reached an agreement on the division of territory in the Far East.

== June 10, 1910 (Friday) ==
- Sir Charles Hardinge, British Under Secretary for Foreign Affairs, was appointed as the Viceroy of India, succeeding the Earl of Minto.
- Born:
  - Armen Takhtajan, Soviet Armenian botanist, creator of Takhtajan system for plant taxonomy; in Shusha, Russian Empire (d. 2009)
  - Professor Backwards (stage name for James Edmondson), American comedian; in Atlanta (murdered 1976)

== June 11, 1910 (Saturday) ==
- In a referendum to determine the permanent location of the capital of Oklahoma, voters favored Oklahoma City over the existing state capital of Guthrie, by a margin of 96,261 to 31,301 (a third choice, Shawnee, received 8,382 votes). Although the enabling act had designated Guthrie as capital until at least 1913, Governor Charles N. Haskell moved the state seal to Oklahoma City, and declared the Lee Huckins Hotel there to be the new capitol until a permanent structure could be built.
- Born: Jacques Cousteau (Jacques-Yves Cousteau), French undersea explorer; in Saint-André-de-Cubzac, Gironde département (d. 1997)

== June 12, 1910 (Sunday) ==
- Torrential rains caused record floods throughout central Europe. The Ahr River overflowed in Germany, killing 200 people around Oberammergau.
- An armed mob in the town of Darrington, Washington, drove out 30 Japanese workers who had recently been hired by the United States Lumber Company. The men were given until Sunday morning to gather their effects, then placed on a train bound for Arlington.
- The Francisco Ferrer Association was created in New York City by 22 anarchists and sympathizers in memory of Francesc Ferrer i Guàrdia. The Association founded a cultural center, a school, and, in 1915, a community built on 140 acres (0.57 km^{2}) of land near New Brunswick, New Jersey.

== June 13, 1910 (Monday) ==
- A 35-ton water tank, located on top of the four-story high Montreal Herald building, fell through the roof after one of its supports collapsed, killing 32 people.
- Halley's Comet was no longer visible, from Earth, with the naked eye, and would not be again until late 1985.

== June 14, 1910 (Tuesday) ==
- The University of the Philippines Los Baños was opened as a college of agriculture, with 50 students taught by Dr. Edwin Copeland.
- Born: Rudolf Kempe, German orchestra conductor; in Dresden (d. 1976)

== June 15, 1910 (Wednesday) ==
- In a battle at Celege in Portuguese East Africa (now Mozambique), Portuguese soldiers fought against hundreds of African tribesmen, and reportedly killed more than 100 of them without sustaining casualties.
- Born: Suleiman Frangieh, President of Lebanon from 1970 to 1976; in Zgharta (d. 1992)

== June 16, 1910 (Thursday) ==
- A cloudburst in Hungary added to existing flood waters, killing 800 people in villages in the Kronstadt district, another 180 in Temesvar and 100 in Moldava.
- The United States Senate unanimously passed a bill extending statehood to the territories of Arizona and New Mexico. Admission as a state still required adopting a proposed state constitution, subject then to the approval of Congress and the president, as well as other procedures.
- Born: Juan Velasco Alvarado, dictator of Peru from 1968 to 1975; in Piura (d. 1977)

== June 17, 1910 (Friday) ==
- Portugal's Prime Minister, Francisco da Veiga Beirão, resigned along with his cabinet.
- James A. Patten and seven other men were indicted by a federal grand jury on charges of conspiracy to monopolize the raw cotton industry.
- At Cotroceni, near Bucharest, Romania, Aurel Vlaicu successfully flew the Vlaicu I airplane that he had constructed, becoming a national hero and pioneer of military aviation in Romania.
- The United States Lighthouse Service was created as federal agency to regulate lighthouses throughout the nation. The office of the Commissioner was transferred to the United States Coast Guard in 1935.
- The U.S. House of Representatives changed its rules in order to prevent bills from being held indefinitely in committee.
- Born: Red Foley (Clyde Julian Foley), American country music singer; Madison County, Kentucky (d. 1968)

== June 18, 1910 (Saturday) ==
- The first "ticker tape parade" was held, as former U.S. President Theodore Roosevelt was welcomed back to the United States after being overseas in Africa and Europe for more than a year. The liner SS Kaiserin Auguste Victoria arrived at New York City, and parades were held to welcome back the former chief executive.
- Alex Smith won the U.S. Open golf tournament in an 18-hole playoff, after he, John J. McDermott, and Macdonald Smith had played the first three-way tie in the event's history.
- The Mann-Elkins act was passed, giving the Interstate Commerce Commission jurisdiction to begin government regulation of interstate telephone, telegraph and cable communications. Another provision of the act gave the ICC immediate power to suspend railroad rate hikes.
- The city of Glendale, Arizona, was incorporated.

== June 19, 1910 (Sunday) ==
- Father's Day was observed for the first time, as the result of the efforts of Mrs. John B. Dodd (Sonora Smart Dodd) to honor her late father, William Smart, and all other fathers. The city of Spokane, Washington, proclaimed the third Sunday in June as Father's Day, a date that later received recognition nationwide.
- Born:
  - Paul Flory, American expert on polymers and 1974 Nobel Prize in Chemistry laureate; in Sterling, Illinois (d. 1985)
  - Abe Fortas, U.S. Supreme Court Justice 1965 to 1969 (d. 1982)

== June 20, 1910 (Monday) ==
- At 1:40 pm, President Taft signed the Enabling Act of 1910, granting the conditions for New Mexico and Arizona to be admitted as states. A solid gold pen, presented by Postmaster General Hitchcock, and an eagle feather pen, presented by New Mexico's delegate to Congress, were used in the White House Ceremony. Statehood was achieved in 1912 for New Mexico as the 47th state and Arizona as the 48th.

== June 21, 1910 (Tuesday) ==
- Thirty-four representatives of different organizations met in New York to establish the Boy Scouts of America.
- At the Académie Nationale de Médecine in Paris, Dr. Jean Hyacinthe Vincent announced his discovery of the first effective vaccine against typhoid fever.

== June 22, 1910 (Wednesday) ==
- Airline travel was inaugurated, as twelve passengers and crew on the DELAG Zeppelin dirigible, Deutschland, departed from the Friedrichshafen airfield at 3:00 in the morning on a nine-hour flight to Düsseldorf.
- Edward, Duke of Cornwall, the 16-year-old son of King George V, was made Prince of Wales by his father.
- Born:
  - Peter Pears, English opera tenor; in Farnham, Hampshire (d. 1986)
  - Konrad Zuse, German computer science pioneer; in Berlin (d. 1995)

== June 23, 1910 (Thursday) ==
- At least 60 people were killed in a train wreck near Manzanillo in Mexico, after four cars broke loose from the locomotive while it climbed a steep grade.
- Born:
  - Jean Anouilh, French playwright known for Becket; in Bordeaux (d. 1987)
  - Gordon B. Hinckley, American Mormon leader, President of the Church of Jesus Christ of Latter-day Saints 1995 to 2008; in Salt Lake City (d. 2008)

== June 24, 1910 (Friday) ==
- President Taft signed the "Wireless Act of 1910" into law. All ships carrying at least 50 persons were required to install radio by July 1, 1911.
- Anonima Lombarda Fabbrica Autombili (ALFA) was founded in Milan. The automaker is now known by the name Alfa Romeo.

== June 25, 1910 (Saturday) ==
- The Mann Act, known popularly as the "White Slave Traffic Act" was passed by the United States Congress, prohibiting the transportation of women across state lines for "immoral purposes".
- Igor Stravinsky's ballet, The Firebird (L'Oiseau de feu), was premiered in Paris. The ballet "made the twenty-eight year old composer famous overnight".
- The U.S. Parole Commission was created, making it possible for the first time for persons, convicted of a federal crime, to be paroled before the end of their sentences. Prior to the passage of the law, a federal prisoner could only secure an early release by commutation or pardon by the president of the United States.
- The United States Postal Savings System was created by law, adapting, for the United States a system that had been used in European nations for people to deposit up to $2,500 into an interest-bearing (2%) account at their local post office. The system would not be fully abolished until 1985.
- The Pickett Act became law, giving the U.S. President authority to withdraw government-owned land from public use, as necessary, for government projects.
- The "direct system" of public land surveying began in the United States, replacing the system of contracting with private surveyors.
- Died: Juan Williams, "father of the Chilean Navy"

== June 26, 1910 (Sunday) ==
- Porfirio Diaz was re-elected President of Mexico for the eighth time, defeating Francisco I. Madero. Madero, who would lead a revolution later in the year, had been jailed earlier in the month.
- Antonio Teixeira de Sousa became the new Prime Minister of Portugal, one day after Julio Vilheno declined an appointment by King Manuel.

== June 27, 1910 (Monday) ==
- In Irwinville, Georgia, cop-killer W.H. Bostwick shot himself after releasing six children whom he had taken hostage. Bostwick had murdered the Irwin County Sheriff and the chief of police of Ocilla the day before, and shot four deputies in the siege, one fatally.
- Three masked bandits conducted a train robbery on the Oregon Short Line, as its train No. 1 approached Ogden, Utah. Nearly 100 passengers and crew lost their money to the thieves.
- Robert A. Taft, the 20-year-old son of the president of the United States (as well as a future U.S. Senator from Ohio), accidentally ran over a pedestrian with his automobile while driving near Beverly, Massachusetts. Michael Thisthwolla received prompt medical attention, and President Taft paid the man's hospital bills, as well as a trip to Italy and more than a year's pay.
- The first "electric bulletin press" was installed in a large window at the New York Times building, introducing the concept of displaying breaking news as it was received. An operator would type news bulletins on an electric keyboard, and the words would be printed in letters 1 1/2 inches high, large enough to be read from the street. The first big test was in instant updates on the July 4 Johnson-Jeffries boxing match.

== June 28, 1910 (Tuesday) ==
- In Germany, the first airline crash took place when the dirigible Deutschland was wrecked by high winds while attempting an emergency landing at Osnabrück. Count Zeppelin's airship was on a flight from Düsseldorf to Dortmund when it encountered high winds. At 5:30 pm, the airship descended into the Teutoburg Forest. The 33 persons on board were uninjured.
- The town of Warden, Washington, was incorporated.
- Died: Samuel Douglas McEnery, 73, U.S. Senator for Mississippi, John Henry Haynes, 61, archaeologist specializing in Babylonia; and Ibrahim Nassif al-Wardani, assassin of Egyptian premier Boutros Ghali.

== June 29, 1910 (Wednesday) ==
- The oldest customs union agreement still in existence, the Southern African Customs Union, was signed by the British administrators of three southern African states that continue to be in the SACU as independent nations. South Africa was joined by Bechuanaland (now Botswana) and Basutoland (now Lesotho). The trade agreement would continue to operate even with South Africa's enforcement of apartheid law as a white-minority ruled republic, with a modification in 1969 and then in 2002 after South Africa had come under majority rule.
- The Interstate Commerce Commission ordered reductions in freight rates on six Western railroads.
- Died: John W. Daniel, U.S. Senator for Virginia.

== June 30, 1910 (Thursday) ==
- Glenn H. Curtiss demonstrated the practicality of aerial bombardment by dropping 20 mock explosives from a biplane over Lake Keuka in New York.
- Nicholas II of Russia signed legislation "concerning the procedure to be complied with issuing laws and decrees of all-Empire significance for Finland", bringing the Grand Duchy of Finland and the Finnish people under Russian rule.
