= Johnson–Jeffries riots =

1910 nationwide race rioting in the U.S. following an interracial boxing match

- Part of the Nadir of American race relations
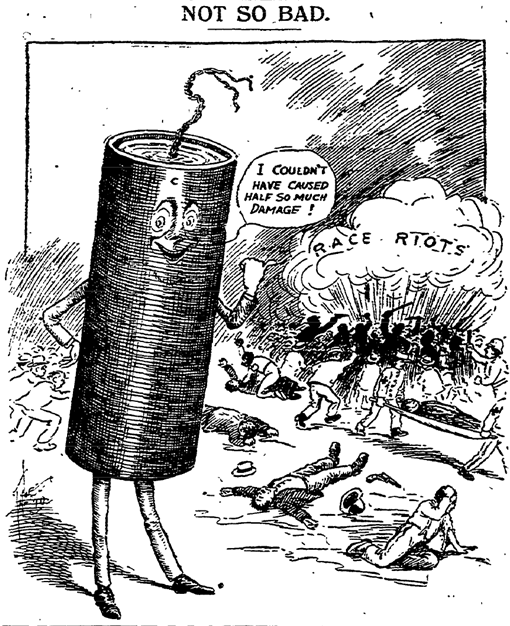
- LA Times political cartoon about the riots.
- Date: July 4, 1910
- Location: United States
- Type: Race riot
- Cause: Jack Johnson vs. James J. Jeffries
- Deaths: 11–26+
- Injuries: Hundreds
- Arrests: Hundreds

The Johnson–Jeffries riots were a series of race riots that occurred throughout the United States after African-American boxer Jack Johnson defeated white boxer James J. Jeffries in a boxing match termed the "Fight of the Century". Johnson became the first black World Heavyweight champion in 1908. This success made him unpopular with the predominantly white American boxing audiences. Jeffries, a former heavyweight champion, came out of retirement to fight Johnson and was nicknamed the "Great White Hope". After Johnson defeated Jeffries on July 4, 1910, many white people became enraged and began attacking black people who were celebrating Johnson's victory.

== Background ==
Jack Johnson had attempted to become heavyweight champion in boxing for several years, but had trouble doing so as the sport was heavily segregated at the beginning of the 20th century. He eventually did become world heavyweight champion after defeating Canadian boxer Tommy Burns in Sydney, Australia, on December 26, 1908. Johnson being heavyweight champion angered many whites, who saw his victory as a threat to white supremacy. Johnson's personal life also angered many white people, as he was notoriously flamboyant and married a white woman. Johnson was considered to be the most hated man in the United States.

Following Johnson's defeat of Burns, American novelist Jack London wrote a column calling upon Jim Jeffries to come out of retirement and face Johnson, so the heavyweight title could be reclaimed by a white man. Jeffries was out of shape at the time and initially refused to fight Johnson but agreed to do so once boxing promoter Tex Rickard offered Jeffries an unprecedented payout of $120,000 if he defeated Johnson. Jeffries accepted and publicly said his intention was "to win the title back for the white race" and that he was "going into this fight for the sole purpose of proving that a white man is better than a Negro." He became known as the "Great White Hope". An editorial in The New York Times prior to the fight stated:

If the black man wins, thousands and thousands of his ignorant brothers will misinterpret his victory as justifying claims to much more than mere physical equality with their white neighbors.

=== The fight ===
The fight occurred on July 4, 1910 in Reno, Nevada. Over 22,000 spectators watched the fight at the arena and tens of thousands packed in congregation halls across the nation to receive live telegraphs reporting on the fight. Johnson quickly began to dominate the fight and eventually defeated Jeffries with a knockout in the 15th round.

== The riots ==
The fight came during a period of heightened racism in the United States. In 1910, 67 lynchings of African-Americans occurred. Many white people were dismayed by the result of the fight and were angered by African-Americans celebrating Johnson's victory and began attacking them. Within two days, 10 Black people had been killed in six different states.

Riots occurred throughout the country in major cities such as Atlanta, Cincinnati, Houston, New York City and St. Louis as well as small towns such as Keystone, West Virginia and Mounds, Illinois. Additionally, Baltimore; Chicago; Clarksburg, West Virginia; Columbus, Ohio; Dayton, Ohio; Fort Worth, Texas; Johnson County, Missouri; Kansas City, Missouri; Little Rock, Arkansas; Los Angeles; Louisville, Kentucky; New Orleans; Norfolk, Virginia; Omaha, Nebraska; Philadelphia; Roanoke, Virginia; Springfield, Illinois; St. Joseph, Missouri, and Wheeling, West Virginia all saw racial disturbances as well.

It is unknown how many people were killed and injured during the riots, but it is estimated that between 11 and 26 people were killed and hundreds more injured. These deaths included three black workers residing in a construction camp, which white gunmen opened fire upon during riots in Uvalda, Georgia and a black man in Wheeling, West Virginia, who was lynched for driving an expensive car as it was reminiscent of Jack Johnson's flamboyant lifestyle.

Large mobs gathered in Norfolk, Virginia, where over 300 white navy sailors searched the streets for black people and in New York City, where within hours of the victory being announced, 11 separate riots erupted as white people entered black neighborhoods in mobs, stoning and setting fire to buildings. They attempted to lynch two black men, beat one to death and injured 100 more. Several white people were stabbed or shot by black people in self-defense. Mobs numbering as many as 7,000 people engaged in violence on the streets of Washington, D.C. Two white men were stabbed to death by black people, hundreds were injured and 236 people were arrested.

== Aftermath ==
After the riots, many state and local governments banned the motion picture film depicting the fight as it set off more race riots. The riots led Congress to ban interstate transportation of boxing films in 1912; the ban was eventually lifted in 1940. The riots, similar to the 1863 draft riots, were a simultaneous explosion of anti-black racial violence occurring across the United States.

== See also ==
- The Johnson–Jeffries Fight, a motion picture of the fight
- Red Summer, a series of race riots in the United States in 1919
- Long, hot summer of 1967, a series of race riots in the United States
- King assassination riots, a series of race riots that occurred after the assassination of Martin Luther King Jr.
