= Jack Johnson vs. James J. Jeffries =

1910 boxing competition

Fight of the Century
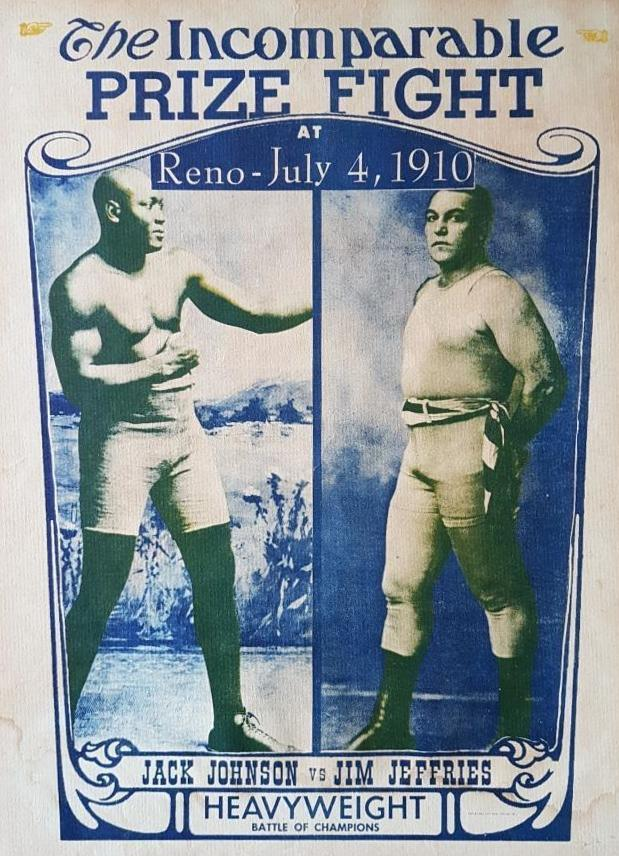
- Promotional poster
- Date: July 4, 1910
- Venue: Reno, Nevada, United States

Tale of the tape
Boxer	Jack Johnson	James J. Jeffries
Nickname	Galveston Giant	Big Jim
Hometown	Galveston, Texas, United States	Carroll, Ohio, United States
Height	6 ft 0 1/2 in (184.2 cm)	6 ft 2 in (188 cm)
Weight	209 lb (95 kg)	225 lb (102 kg)
Recognition	World heavyweight champion	Former world heavyweight champion

Result
- Johnson won via 15th round TKO

The Fight of the Century or the Johnson–Jeffries Prize Fight was a boxing match between the first African American world heavyweight champion of boxing, Jack Johnson, and the previously undefeated world heavyweight champion James J. Jeffries, on July 4, 1910, U.S. Independence Day. It was highly significant in the history of race relations in the U.S., and led to the Johnson–Jeffries riots in which more than 20 people died.

It was one of the most eagerly anticipated boxing matches of all time, with betting odds significantly favoring Jeffries, who had come back from retirement for the fight. The lead-up to the bout was peppered with racist press against Johnson; author Jack London described Jeffries two days before the fight as "the chosen representative of the white race, and this time the greatest of them", whilst a New York Times editorial wrote: "If the black man wins, thousands and thousands of his ignorant brothers will misinterpret his victory as justifying claims to much more than mere physical equality with their white neighbors."

Johnson beat Jeffries in the fifteenth round, approximately one hour after the fight began at 1:30 pm PST. Jeffries—who boasted that he had never been knocked down in a fight—fell three times to Johnson's punches, and was being counted out when his manager called the fight. Race riots broke out across the country over the following week—the first truly nationwide race riots in the United States.

A crowd of 18,020 attended in a wooden stadium built for the fight, and telegraphed reports were followed across the nation. Johnson and Jeffries both made over $100,000 from the purse, bonuses, and the sale of film rights. The film – The Johnson–Jeffries Fight – received more public attention in the United States than any other film to date and for the next five years, until the release of The Birth of a Nation, and was subsequently censored in many states and cities – the first racist movement for film censorship in US history.

== Background ==
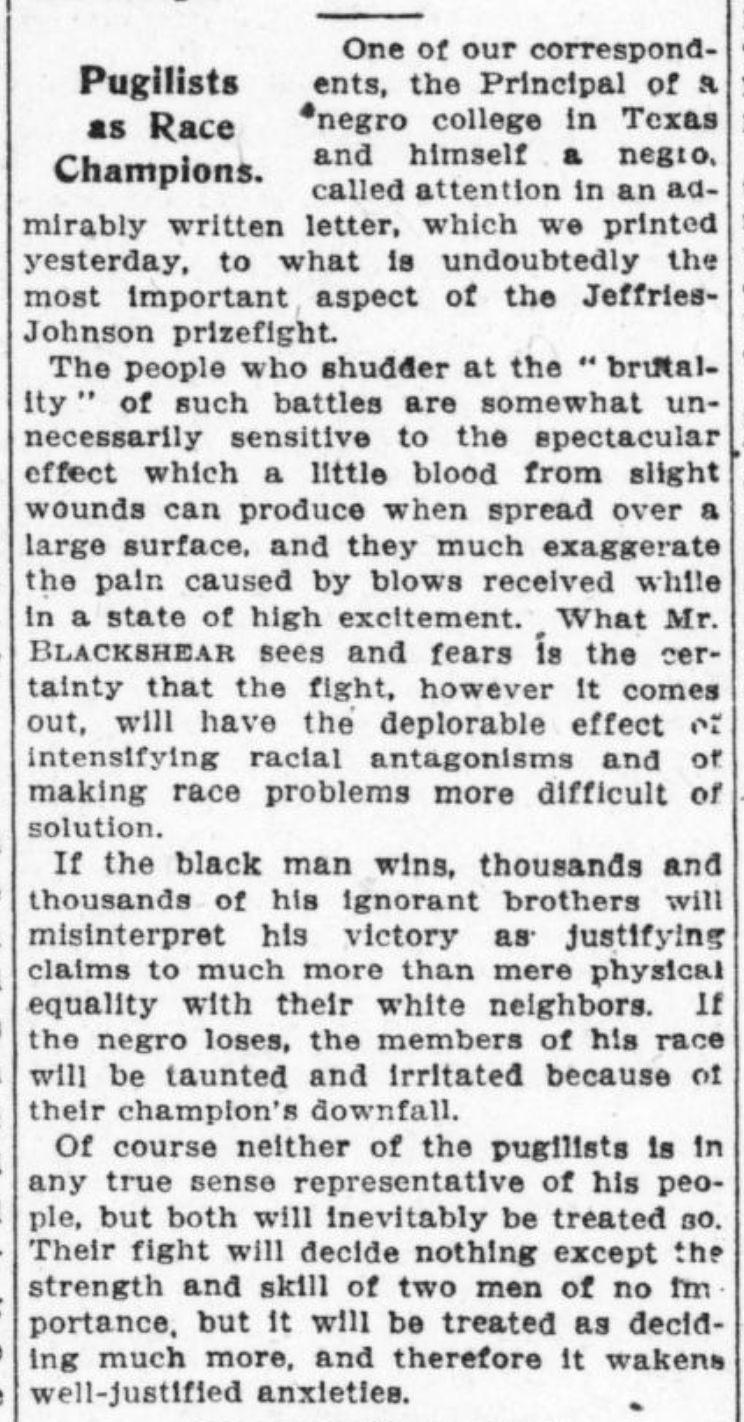
The New York Times editorial, May 12, 1910, commenting on the upcoming fight

In 1910, former undefeated heavyweight champion James J. Jeffries, came out of retirement to challenge Johnson, saying "I am going into this fight for the sole purpose of proving that a white man is better than a Negro". Aged 35, he had not fought in six years and he had to lose well over 100 pounds (45 kg) in order to get back to his championship fighting weight. Efforts to persuade Jeffries to "retrieve the honor of the white race" began immediately after the Tommy Burns–Johnson fight. Initially Jeffries had no interest in the fight, being quite happy as an alfalfa farmer. However, on October 29, 1909, Johnson and Jeffries signed an agreement to "box for the heavyweight championship of the world" and called promoters to bid for the right to orchestrate the event.

In early December 1909, Johnson and Jeffries selected a bid from the nation's top boxing promoters—Tex Rickard and John Gleason. The bid guaranteed a purse of $101,000 (equivalent to $3,619,000 in 2025) to be divided 75% to the winner and 25% to the loser, as well as two-thirds of the revenues collected from the sales of the right to film the fight (each boxer received one third of the equity rights). Although it was well understood that a victory for Jeffries was likely to be more profitable than a victory for Johnson, there were no doubts that the event would produce record profits. Jeffries mostly remained hidden from media attention until the day of the fight, while Johnson soaked up the spotlight. John L. Sullivan, the former champion bare-knuckle boxer who had made boxing championships a popular and esteemed spectacle, stated that Johnson was in such good physical shape compared to Jeffries that he would only lose if he had a lack of skill on the day of the fight. Before the fight, Jeffries remarked, "It is my intention to go right after my opponent and knock him out as soon as possible." His wife added, "I'm not interested in prizefighting but I am interested in my husband's welfare, I do hope this will be his last fight." Johnson's words were "May the best man win."

Racial tension was brewing in the lead-up to the fight and in order to prevent any harm from coming to either boxer, guns were prohibited within the arena along with the sale of alcohol and anyone who was under the effects of alcohol. Apples were also banned as well as any weapon whatsoever. Behind the racial attitudes which were being instigated by the media was a major investment in gambling for the fight, with 10–7 odds in favor of Jeffries. The lead-up to the bout was peppered with racist press against Johnson; American author Jack London described Jeffries two days before the fight as "the chosen representative of the white race, and this time the greatest of them."

Black advocates foresaw violence as an inevitable outcome of such a racial match. Two months before the bout, E. L. Blackshear, principal of Prairie View Normal and Industrial College, the oldest historically black college in Texas, warned in a letter to the New York Times that

This thing is calculated to array the sentiment of the entire country against the negro.... While it is true Johnson's defeat would probably be attended immediately by expression of anti-negro feeling, these expressions would be comparatively mild and transient. But if Johnson wins the anti-negro sentiment will quickly and dangerously collect itself ready to strike back at any undue exhibition of rejoicing on the part of negroes. Race prejudice is already sufficiently acute in the United States. This fight ought to be called off.

The next day, a New York Times editorial agreed the fight was risky, but for a very different reason: "If the black man wins, thousands and thousands of his ignorant brothers will misinterpret his victory as justifying claims to much more than mere physical equality with their white neighbors."

== The fight ==
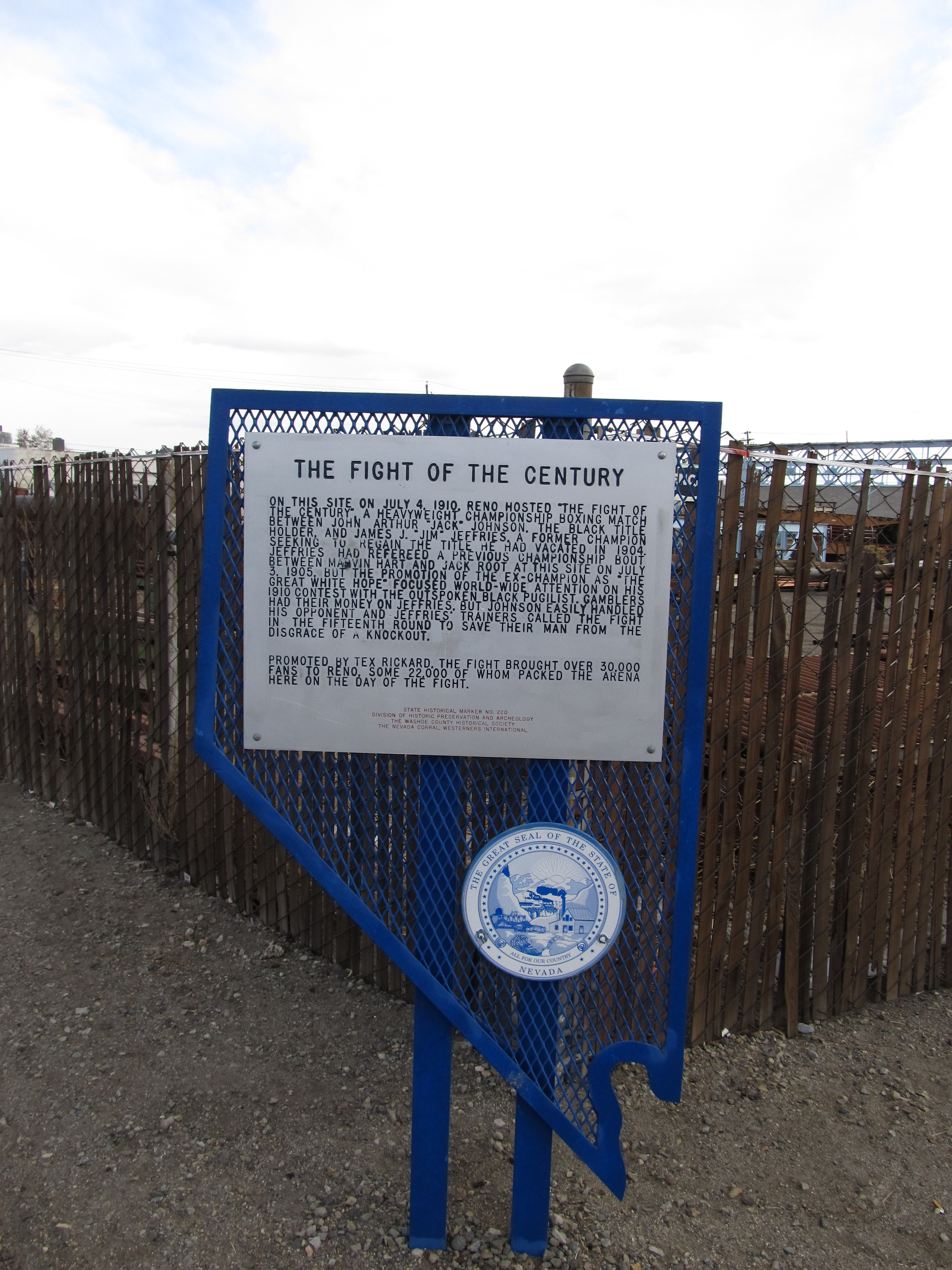
Memorial marking the location of the fight

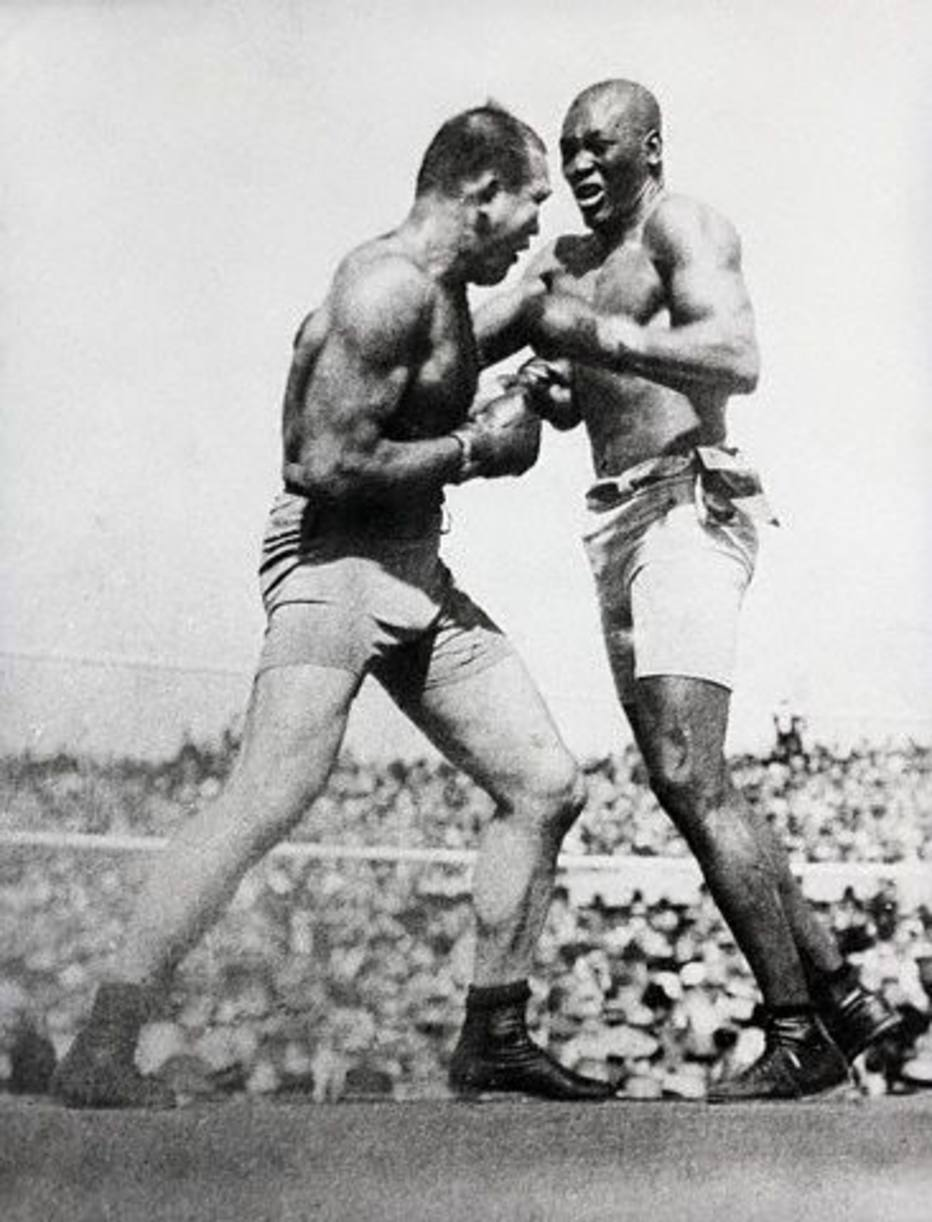
A photograph of the fight

The fight took place on July 4, 1910, in front of nearly 20,000 people, at a ring which was built just for the occasion in downtown Reno, Nevada. Jeffries proved unable to impose his will on the younger champion and Johnson dominated the fight. By the 15th round, after Jeffries had been knocked down twice for the first time in his career, Jeffries's corner threw in the towel to end the fight and prevent Jeffries from having a knockout on his record.

Johnson later remarked he knew the fight was over in the 4th round when he landed an uppercut and saw the look on Jeffries's face, stating, "I knew what that look meant. The old ship was sinking."

The "Fight of the Century" earned Johnson $65,000 (over $2.2 million in 2025 dollars) and silenced the critics, who had belittled Johnson's previous victory over Tommy Burns as "empty", claiming that Burns was a false champion since Jeffries had retired undefeated. John L. Sullivan commented after the fight that Johnson won deservedly, fairly, and convincingly:

The fight of the century is over and a black man is the undisputed champion of the world. It was a poor fight as fights go, this less than 15-round affair between James J. Jeffries and Jack Johnson. Scarcely has there ever been a championship contest that was so one-sided. All of Jeffries much-vaunted condition amounted to nothing. He wasn't in it from the first bell tap to the last ... The negro had few friends, but there was little demonstration against him. (Spectators) could not help but admire Johnson because he is the type of prizefighter that is admired by sportsmen. He played fairly at all times and fought fairly ... What a crafty, powerful, cunning left hand (Johnson) has. He is one of the craftiest, cunningest boxers that ever stepped into the ring ... They both fought closely all during the 15 rounds. It was just the sort of fight that Jeffries wanted. There was no running or ducking like Corbett did with me in New Orleans (1892). Jeffries did not miss so many blows, because he hardly started any. Johnson was on top of him all the time ... (Johnson) didn't get gay (confident) at all with Jeffries in the beginning, and it was always the white man who clinched, but Johnson was very careful, and he backed away and took no chances, and was good-natured with it all ... The best man won, and I was one of the first to congratulate him, and also one of the first to extend my heartfelt sympathy to the beaten man.

== Riots and aftermath ==
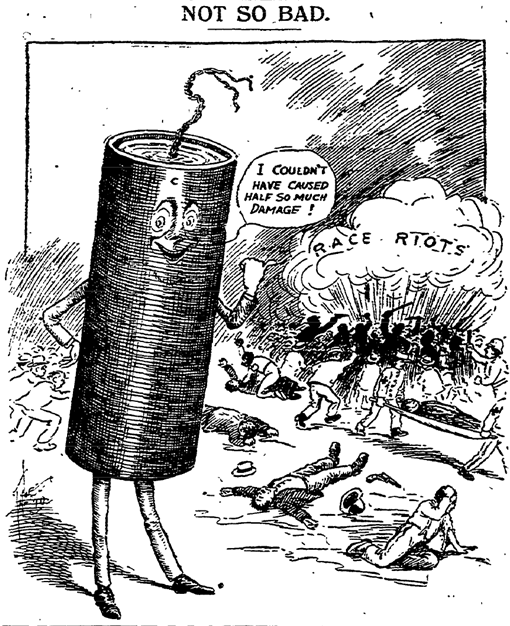
On July 7, 1910, the Los Angeles Times noted the explosive nature of Johnson's victory by featuring this cartoon in which a stick of dynamite suggests that it would not have caused even half as much damage as the fight did.

The outcome of the fight triggered race riots that evening—the Fourth of July—all across the United States, from Texas and Colorado to New York and Washington, D.C. Johnson's victory over Jeffries had dashed white dreams of finding a "great white hope" to defeat him. Many whites felt humiliated by the defeat of Jeffries.

Blacks, on the other hand, were jubilant, and celebrated Johnson's great victory as a victory for racial advancement. Black poet William Waring Cuney later highlighted the black reaction to the fight in his poem "My Lord, What a Morning".

Race riots erupted in New York, Baltimore, Pittsburgh, Philadelphia, New Orleans, Atlanta, St. Louis, Little Rock and Houston. In all, riots occurred in more than 25 states and 50 cities. At least 20 people across the U.S. were killed in the riots, and hundreds more were injured.

== Film of the bout ==
Jeffries–Johnson World's Championship Boxing Contest
- Based on: Jack Johnson vs. James J. Jeffries
- Produced by: John Stuart Blackton
- Starring: Jack Johnson; James J. Jeffries
- Distributed by: J. & J. Co.
- Release date: 1910
- Running time: 100 minutes
- Country: United States
- Language: Silent film

Anticipation for the fight sparked motivation to film the event as it was thought to be a guaranteed money-maker. The fight's promoter, George "Tex" Rickard, (who also refereed the bout) sold exclusive film rights. The film was recorded by nine cameramen and is 100 minutes long. Jeffries–Johnson World's Championship Boxing Contest film, released the year of the fight, received more public attention in the United States than any other film to date and for the next five years, until the 1915 release of The Birth of a Nation. In the United States, many states and cities banned the exhibition of the film. The movement to censor Johnson's victory took over the country within three days after the fight.

Two weeks after the match former President Theodore Roosevelt, an avid boxer and fan, wrote an article for The Outlook in which he supported banning not just moving pictures of boxing matches, but a complete ban on all U.S. prize fights. He cited the "crookedness" and gambling that surrounded such contests and that moving pictures have "introduced a new method of money getting and of demoralization". The controversy surrounding the film directly motivated Congress to ban distribution of all prize-fight films across state lines in 1912; the ban was lifted in 1940.

In 2005, the film of the Jeffries–Johnson "Fight of the Century" was selected for preservation in the United States National Film Registry for its historical and cultural significance.

== Legacy in media ==
- The Great White Hope (1967 play)
- The Great White Hope (1970 film)

== See also ==
- Joe Frazier vs. Muhammad Ali
- List of boxing films

== Bibliography ==
- Hietala, T. R. (2002). The Fight of the Century: Jack Johnson, Joe Louis, and the Struggle for Racial Equality. M.E. Sharpe. ISBN 978-0-7656-0723-2.
- Greenwood, R. (2004). The Prize Fight of the Century: Jack Johnson Vs. James Jeffries: Reno, Nevada, July 4, 1910. Jack Bacon & Company. ISBN 978-0-930083-13-7.
- Orbach, B. Y. (2010). The Johnson-Jeffries Fight and Censorship of Black Supremacy (PDF). New York University Journal of Law & Liberty.
- Rozen, W. A. (2004). America on the Ropes: A Pictorial History of the Johnson – Jeffries Fight. Casey Press LLC. ISBN 978-0-9762964-0-9.
- Jack Johnson vs. James Jeffries: Topics in Chronicling America, Library of Congress
- Jack London, Jack Johnson, and the Fight of the Century, at The Public Domain Review
