= Theodor Wulf =

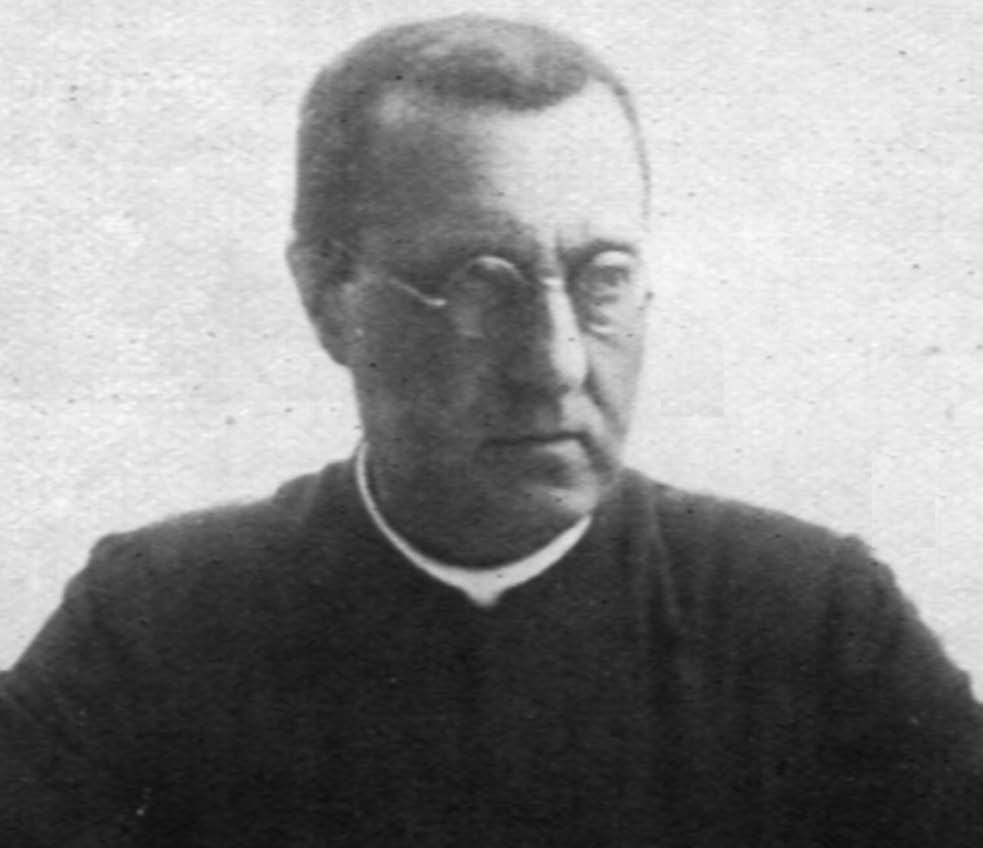
- Theodor Wulf in 1910
- Born: 28 July 1868; Hamm, North Rhine-Westphalia, Germany
- Died: 19 June 1946 (aged 77); Hallenberg, Hochsauerland, North Rhine-Westphalia, Germany
- Occupations: Physicist, priest

Theodor Wulf (28 July 1868 – 19 June 1946) was a German physicist and Jesuit priest who was one of the first experimenters to detect excess atmospheric radiation.

Theodor Wulf became a Jesuit priest at the age of 20, before studying physics with Walther Nernst at the University of Göttingen. He taught physics at Valkenburg, a Jesuit University from 1904 to 1914 and 1918-1935. He designed and built an electrometer which could detect the presence of energetic charged particles (or electromagnetic waves). Since natural radiation sources on the ground were detected by his electrometer, he predicted that if he moved far enough away from those sources he would detect less radiation.

To test his hypothesis, in 1910 he compared the radiation at the bottom and the top of the Eiffel Tower. He found that the ionisation fell from 6 ions cm^{−3} to 3.5 ions cm^{−3} as he ascended the Eiffel Tower (330m). If the ionisation had been due to γ-rays originating at the surface of the Earth, the intensity of ions should have halved in 80m. Energy was coming from outside the Earth's atmosphere and being detected by his device; this radiation was from cosmic rays. He published a paper in Physikalische Zeitschrift detailing the results of his four days of observation on the Eiffel Tower. His results were not initially accepted.

== Publications ==
- Uber den Einfluss des Druckes auf die elektromotorische Kraft der Gaselektroden. Physikalische Zeitschrift Chemie
- About the radiation of high penetration capacity contained in the atmosphere. Physikalische Zeitschrift
- Einstein's relativity theory, 1921.
- Text book of physics, 1926.
- Electrostatic attempts with application of the universal electroscope, 1928.
- The oscillatory movement, 1931.
- The Thread Electrometers, 1933.
- The Components of the Body World, 1935.

== See also ==
- Radiant energy
- List of Jesuit scientists
- List of Roman Catholic scientist-clerics
