= Erbslöh =

German airship in service 1909–1910

Coordinates: 51°05′41″N 7°01′09″E

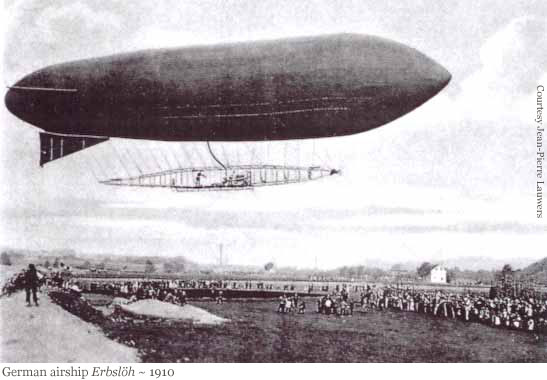
The airship Erbslöh

The Erbslöh was an airship named for the German aviation pioneer Oskar Erbslöh that was operational in 1909 and 1910. In July 1910, the Erbslöh crashed near Leverkusen, killing all five people on board, including Oskar Erbslöh himself.

== History ==
The Erbslöh was a blimp with a 27-metre (89 ft) long gondola made from ash. The trim was regulated by pumping water back and forth between two tanks in the bow and aft section of the ship so that the airship adopted a nose up or nose down attitude.

The first test flight took place on 20 August 1909. After the airship had been moved out of its hangar, the manoeuvrability was tested for about one hour at a height of 100 metres (330 ft) on the Leichlingen airship grounds. The official maiden flight was conducted on 1 December 1909, during which the airship successfully flew across Leichlingen and neighbouring towns.

On 12 December supporters of the Rheinisch-Westfälische Motorluftschiff-Gesellschaft [Rhine-Westphalian Motor Airship Society] participated in a flight. However, a transmission fault forced the Erbslöh to land at Reusrath. When the faulty parts had been repaired, the Erbslöh flew on toward Mönchengladbach on the next day. The intermediate stop over there was terminated by a storm which tore the envelope from the gondola, necessitating an extensive repairs.

== Crash ==
On 13 July 1910, a partly cloudy day, the Erbslöh crashed near Pattscheid (today a quarter of Leverkusen). The cause that was accepted by the subsequent investigation committee was that a sudden exposure of the envelope to the sun after the ship had been flying under cloud cover and cool morning fog had heated the lifting gas, causing it to expand. The relief valves could not vent the developing excess pressure quickly enough. This allowed hydrogen to leak from the envelope and come into contact with sparks from the propulsion system, causing the gas to explode.

Witnesses on the ground only heard an explosion: the ship was not visible in the morning fog. The Erbslöh crashed in a field close to Neuenkamp. The front part of the gondola was destroyed, with the torn envelope lying across it. The crew was found dead among the debris. The airship planned to be flown over Leichlingen for only half an hour.

In addition to Oskar Erbslöh, crash fatalities included Max von Toelle, Rudolf Kranz, Hans Leo Höpp, and mechanic Joseph Spicks. A monument was erected at the "Oskar-Erbslöh-Straße" [Oskar Erbslöh Road] of Leichlingen in their memory.

== Technical data ==
- Length: 53.20 metres (174.5 ft)
- Diameter: 10.50 metres (34.4 ft)
- Volume: 2,900 cubic metres (100,000 cu ft)
- Propulsion: 92 kW (125 hp) engine with 400 rpm, double-winged propeller with a diameter of 4.55 metres (14.9 ft)
- Maximum speed: 45 km/h (28 mph)
