= Oskar Erbslöh =

German aviation pioneer

Oskar Erbslöh (21 April 1879 – 13 July 1910) was a German aviation pioneer.

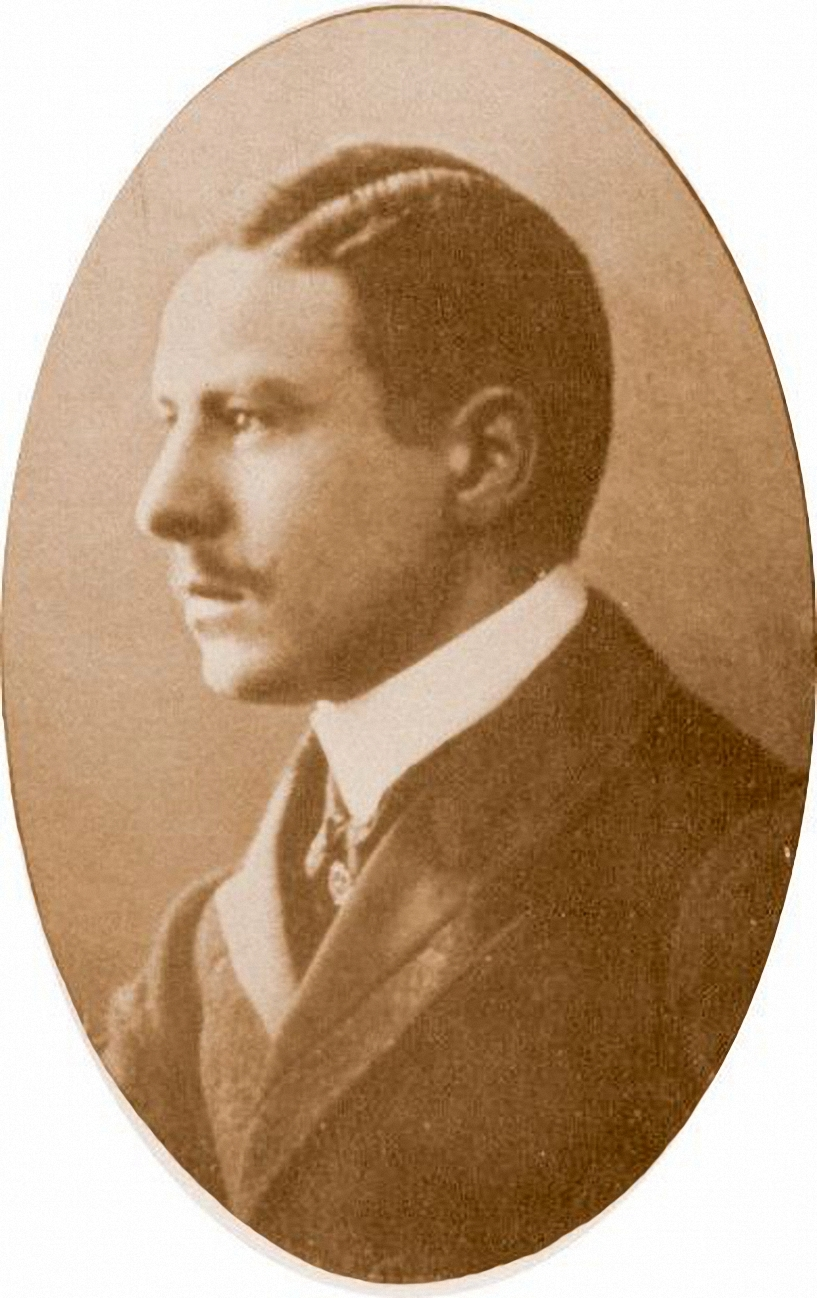
Winner Gordon Bennett Cup in ballooning 1907

== Early life ==
Erbslöh came from a family of merchants in Elberfeld. His father, Carl Emil Erbslöh, ran a manufacturing business there. Oskar received his education at the Elberfelder Realgymnasium and completed a commercial apprenticeship in Hanover. Around 1900 he gained business experience abroad and traveled to North America. He turned early to various sports and in 1904 to ballooning in particular. After fulfilling his military duty, in 1905 he joined the family business as a partner.

== Work ==
In 1905 Erbslöh was named Ballonführer of the Niederrheinischer Verein für Luftschifffahrt (Lower Rhine Airship Club), which had been founded in 1902. In 1906 he won first prizes in several national ballooning races. On 30 September 1906, at the first Gordon Bennett Cup, Erbslöh took ninth place along with Hugo von Abercron in the balloon Düsseldorf. On 15 September 1907, Erbslöh won the international race of the Fédération Aéronautique Internationale, for which he received not only the winner's trophy but a golden plaque from Fédération founder Prince Roland Bonaparte, which helped him to greater international fame.

On October 21, 1907, at the second Gordon Bennett Cup in St. Louis, Erbslöh and his companion Henry Helm Clayton won first place, traveling 1403.55 kilometers over 40 hours in his balloon Pomerania.

In 1908 Erbslöh turned from ballooning to motorized air sports. Under his chairmanship was founded the Rheinisch-Westfälische Motorluftschiff-Gesellschaft, whose purpose was the construction of powered airships. In 1909, the company built an airship hangar on 20 acres of land leased from the town of Leichlingen. Simultaneously with the construction of the hangar began the construction of the airship Erbslöh.

Also in 1909, Erbslöh piloted the balloon Berlin in a 30-hour voyage over the Alps. He reached an altitude of 18,000 feet and experienced an average temperature of −12 °F (−24 °C).

On 13 July 1910, Erbslöh died in the crash of the Erbslöh, when the benzine tank of its gasoline-powered engine exploded at an altitude of 480 meters over Pattscheid. The airship had recently been refitted for passenger service. Erbslöh's death came only one day after the death of his friend, British aviation pioneer Charles Rolls.

The New York Times reported in July 1910 that at Oskar's funeral his own father had had a stroke and died, but this contradicts the family company's own statement (in 1914) that the elder Erbslöh had in fact died ten months afterward.

== Honors ==
In 1913, the city of Leichlingen asked Kaiser Wilhelm II for permission to display the airship Erbslöh in the city's coat of arms. Wilhelm rejected the city's request.

A monument to Erbslöh stands in Leichlingen near the eponymous Oskar-Erbslöh-Straße. Other streets named after Erbslöh are in Wuppertal, Solingen, Essen, and Langenfeld. The Langenfeld aero club is named for Erbslöh. On August 24, 2011, the municipal council of Schönefeld named a street in the entrance area of Berlin Brandenburg Airport after Oskar Erbslöh.

Erbslöh's grave is located in the Friedhof Hochstraße, an Old Lutheran cemetery in Wuppertal.
